= CSI: NY season 8 =

CSI: NY
- Season 8
- Season 8 U.S. DVD cover
- No. of episodes: 18

Release
- Original network: CBS
- Original release: September 23, 2011 – May 11, 2012

Season chronology
- ← Previous; Season 7 Next → Season 9

The eighth season of CSI: NY originally aired on CBS between September 2011 and May 2012. It consisted of 18 episodes. Its regular time slot continued on Fridays at 9pm/8c.

CSI: NY – The Eighth Season was released on DVD in the U.S. on September 25, 2012.

== Cast ==
=== Main cast ===
- Gary Sinise as Mac Taylor
- Sela Ward as Jo Danville
- Carmine Giovinazzo as Danny Messer
- Anna Belknap as Lindsay Messer
- Robert Joy as Sid Hammerback
- A. J. Buckley as Adam Ross
- Hill Harper as Sheldon Hawkes
- Eddie Cahill as Don Flack

=== Recurring cast ===
- Kathleen Munroe as Samantha Flack
- Megan Dodds as Christine Whitney

== Episodes ==
No. overall	No. in season	Title	Directed by	Written by	Original release date	US viewers (millions)
163	1	"Indelible"	Frederick E. O. Toye	Zachary Reiter & John Dove	September 23, 2011	10.68
The tenth anniversary of 9/11 proves a wrenching but clarifying passage for Mac, who, on that day, suffered the terrible loss of his wife Claire Taylor. (Note: Jaime Ray Newman as Claire Taylor) Mac reconnects with former NYFD member Joe Vincent, (Note: Robert Forster as Joe Vincent) who lost his son on 9/11, to convince him to make a commemorative appearance at the Brooklyn Wall of Remembrance. The Crime Lab investigation of an open-and-shut robbery/homicide proves more complicated than the team had anticipated when Devon Hargrove's (Note: Cassidy Freeman as Devon Hargrove) witness statement is called into question. The episode is followed by a message from actor Gary Sinise regarding the Brooklyn Wall of Remembrance at MCU Park, highlighting its official website, brooklyn911wall.org.
164	2	"Keep It Real"	Alex Zakrzewski	Bill Haynes	September 30, 2011	10.07
When an awkward teen is found dead, the team discovers that his efforts to win a sexy punk rock chick's heart may have gone a step too far. Aly Michalka guest-stars.
165	3	"Cavallino Rampante"	Nathan Hope	Adam Targum	October 7, 2011	9.87
When the body of a young woman is found in a stolen Ferrari, the investigation leads to a family of car thieves being targeted by a cold and calculating serial killer named Dominik Janos, who's desperate to find what was stolen from him and is willing to kill anyone standing in his way. Now on a race against time, the CSIs must find Janos and the car before the rest of the family meets their demise at his hands.
166	4	"Officer Involved"	Skipp Sudduth	Christopher Silber	October 14, 2011	10.13
A night out for a friendly drink takes an unexpected turn when Danny and his rookie cops are caught up in a shooting.
167	5	"Air Apparent"	Anthony Hemingway	Aaron Rahsaan Thomas	October 21, 2011	10.73
CSIs investigate Hank Frazier, (Note: Justin Bruening as Hank Frazier) the recently paroled brother of young basketball prodigy Riley Frazier, (Note: Robbie Amell as Riley Frazier) after the murder of Hank's girlfriend, Angela Kelly. They must determine if he is guilty or being set up by Riley's coach, Dwight Gavin. (Note: Scott Lowell as Coach Dwight Gavin)
168	6	"Get Me Out of Here!"	Scott White	Trey Callaway	November 4, 2011	9.83
The CSIs investigate when a fraternity prank goes awry on Halloween and a pledge master is left for dead in an open grave.
169	7	"Crushed"	Duane Clark	Kim Clements	November 11, 2011	10.14
News of a high school house party goes viral but it ends in disaster when a balcony full of teenagers collapses from overcrowding, injuring the teens and killing a girl. During their investigations they uncover more than they had expected and the CSIs must use social media to uncover the truth about how she died. Meanwhile, Jo's final case at the FBI returns to haunt her when the suspect comes to New York and claims another victim.
170	8	"Crossroads"	Jeff T. Thomas	John Dove	November 18, 2011	9.97
As the CSIs investigate the assassination of a judge, Jo comes face-to-face with a criminal from her past.
171	9	"Means to an End"	Marshall Adams	Zachary Reiter & Christopher Silber	December 2, 2011	9.76
The death of an important witness will lead Jo to a dangerous investigation of a suspected rapist who was freed on her watch in Washington D.C.
172	10	"Clean Sweep"	David Von Ancken	Adam Targum	January 6, 2012	10.56
The death of a rising boxer and the confessions of a drunken boy leads the CSI to a mysterious stalker.
173	11	"Who's There?"	Vikki Williams	Bill Haynes	January 13, 2012	10.60
A home-invasion robbery turned wrong when a real-estate mogul was killed. But it seems like his murder was linked with a plan on a social networking profile.
174	12	"Brooklyn 'Til I Die"	Eric Laneuville	Aaron Rahsaan Thomas	February 3, 2012	10.25
The CSIs investigate when a role-playing game turns lethal, with one player falling victim to a bona fide killer and the other kidnapped and held for ransom.
175	13	"The Ripple Effect"	Oz Scott	Trey Callaway	February 10, 2012	10.44
When the CSIs investigate two seemingly unrelated deaths, their separate trails of evidence lead to a surprisingly connected conclusion.
176	14	"Flash Pop"	Jerry Levine	Pam Veasey	March 30, 2012	9.45
The Crime Lab day shift must solve the murder of night shift CSI Lab Technichian Jessica Drake, which mirrors the 1957 cold case murder of Lana Gregory. Suspects include fellow night shift CSIs Harlan Porter, (Note: Aaron Hill as Harlan Porter) and Kim Barnett. (Note: Spencer Grammer as Kim Barnett) Former NYPD Det. Paul Burton, (Note: Lee Majors as Paul Burton) who investigated Lana's murder provides Mac a vital clue; the color of Lana's lipstick, Stormy Red, which did not show in his original black and white crime photos. Mac becomes romantically involved with his former patrol partner's sister, Christine Whitney. (Note: Megan Dodds as Christine Whitney)
177	15	"Kill Screen"	Allison Liddi-Brown	Tim Dragga & Adam Scott Weissman	April 6, 2012	9.07
The CSIs find themselves immersed in the world of competitive video gaming when they discover a murder may be related to a high-stakes tournament.
178	16	"Sláinte"	Christine Moore	Sarah Byrd	April 27, 2012	9.13
The team is surprised by an explosion after a wave of brutality threatens a small New York City community when a body is found dismembered and strategically left out on four street corners.
179	17	"Unwrapped"	Deran Sarafian	John Dove & Christopher Silber	May 4, 2012	9.06
The CSIs are called to a Brooklyn housing project to investigate the murder of a successful businessman who still felt the pull of his old neighborhood.
180	18	"Near Death"	Alex Zakrzewski	Zachary Reiter & Pam Veasey	May 11, 2012	9.11
When Mac is shot during a robbery gone wrong, he finds himself in limbo between life and death. As he fights for his life, the team struggles to keep their emotions in check as they process the evidence and bring the shooter to justice.
