= List of CSI: NY characters =

The following is a list of characters from the CBS crime drama television series, CSI: NY. It follows New York criminalists (identified as "the Crime Scene Investigators") working for the New York Police Department (NYPD) as they use physical evidence to solve murders.

== Main characters ==
Actor	Character	Occupation	First Episode	Final Episode	Seasons								
Actor	Character	Occupation	First Episode	Final Episode	1	2	3	4	5	6	7	8	9
Gary Sinise	Mac Taylor	Criminalistics Director; NYPD Day Shift Supervisor; Head CSI Detective 1st Grade	"Blink"^{^{1} ^{2} ^{3}}	"Today is Life"	Main	Main	Main	Main	Main	Main	Main	Main	Main
Melina Kanakaredes	Stella Bonasera	NYPD Day Shift; Assistant Supervisor; CSI Detective 1st Grade	"Blink"^{^{1}}	"Vacation Getaway"	Main	Main	Main	Main	Main	Main			
Carmine Giovinazzo	Danny Messer	NYPD Day Shift; CSI Detective 2nd Grade	"Blink"^{^{1}}	"Today is Life"	Main	Main	Main	Main	Main	Main	Main	Main	Main
Vanessa Ferlito	Aiden Burn	NYPD Day Shift; CSI Detective 3rd Grade	"Blink"^{^{1}}	"Heroes"	Main	Main							
Hill Harper	Dr. Sheldon Hawkes	Former New York County; Medical Examiner/ NYPD CSI Detective 3rd Grade	"Blink"^{^{1}}	"Today is Life"	Main	Main	Main	Main	Main	Main	Main	Main	Main
Eddie Cahill	Don Flack	NYPD Day Shift; Homicide Detective 1st Grade	"Blink"	"Today is Life"	Main	Main	Main	Main	Main	Main	Main	Main	Main
Anna Belknap	Lindsay Monroe Messer	NYPD Day Shift; CSI Detective 3rd Grade	"Zoo York"	"Today is Life"		Main	Main	Main	Main	Main	Main	Main	Main
Robert Joy	Dr. Sid Hammerback	New York County; Chief Medical Examiner	"Dancing with the Fishes"	"Today is Life"		Recurring	Recurring	Recurring	Main	Main	Main	Main	Main
A. J. Buckley	Adam Ross	NYPD Day Shift; CSI Lab Technician	"Bad Beat"	"Today is Life"		Recurring	Recurring	Recurring	Main	Main	Main	Main	Main
Sela Ward	Jo Danville	NYPD Day Shift; Assistant Supervisor; CSI Detective 1st Grade	"The 34th Floor"	"Today is Life"							Main	Main	Main

^{1}Character first introduced during CSI: Miami episode 2.23 "MIA/NYC NonStop".
^{2}Also in CSI: Miami episode 4.07 "Felony Flight".
^{3}Also in CSI: Crime Scene Investigation episode 13.13 "In Vino Veritas".

== Recurring characters ==
=== Crime lab ===
==== Technicians ====
- Dr. Leonard Giles (played by J. Grant Albrecht in season 1) is a technician in the Toxicology lab. He is a former runner now paralyzed from the waist down.
- Jane Parsons (played by Sonya Walger in seasons 1–2) is a technician in the DNA lab.
- Chad Willingham (played by Chad Lindberg in season 1) is a technician in the Ballistics lab.
- Zack Shannon (played by David Julian Hirsh in season 2) is a tech in the Trace lab.
- Kendall Novak (played by Bess Wohl in season 4) is a technician in the Trace lab. She has a close relationship with Adam Ross.
- Haylen Becall (played by Sarah Carter in season 6) is a crime scene cleanup contractor. Despite budget cuts resulting in a hiring freeze, she obtained a New York State Police grant to get her hired as a part-time entry-level lab technician. Adam Ross is afraid she might ultimately replace him. The FBI does a background check on her and when she no longer appears, it is assumed that she was hired by them.

==== Medical examiners ====
- Dr. Evan Zao (played by Ron Yuan in season 2) was supposed to replace Dr. Sheldon Hawkes as Medical Examiner after Hawkes took field work as a CSI, but only appears in the first four episodes of season two. He reveals that during his teenage years, he bussed tables at debutante functions (2.03 "Zoo York").
- Dr. Marty Pino (played by Jonah Lotan in seasons 2 & 5) appears as a night shift Medical Examiner in season two. He is known for wearing a Giants football jersey under his scrubs. In season five, it is disclosed that Pino became heavily involved in gambling and ran up significant debts and Dr. Sid Hammerback was forced to fire him after Pino was caught forging overtime slips. In episode 5.18 "Point of No Return," Pino's wife, Anabel, is found shot dead. The investigation leads to a drug scheme that Pino was running by creating heroin from the organs of dead drug addicts. In a hostage stand-off, Pino eventually surrenders after being talked down by Hawkes and Sid and is arrested for drug trafficking.
- Dr. Peyton Driscoll (played by Claire Forlani in seasons 3–4 & 6) joins the team at the beginning of season three as a Medical Examiner originally from London and love interest for Mac. Peyton was previously acquainted with Sheldon Hawkes when he was still in the ME's Office. She feels guilty in episode 3.07 "Murder Sings the Blues" when she accidentally lets it slip to Mac that Hawkes knew a murder victim, which results in Hawkes being reprimanded and kicked off the case. In episode 3.20 "What Schemes May Come," Peyton is assaulted at the morgue by two people who steal one of the bodies she is helping to transport. At the end of episode 3.24 "Snow Day" Peyton and Mac fly to London together to meet her family. She does not return and in season four sends Mac a "Dear John" letter. However, Peyton returns for a visit in episode 6.22 "Point of View". Forlani was expected to return during season seven, however the departure of Melina Kanakaredes and the subsequent casting of Sela Ward changed the producers' intentions.

=== Police officers ===
- Kaile Maka (played by Kelly Hu in seasons 1–2) is a homicide detective who accompanies the CSIs on some of their investigations. In her first appearance, Maka has just returned to duty after being shot in the arm, claiming that she "still sets off metal detectors" (1.11 "Tri-Borough").
- Jessica Angell (played by Emmanuelle Vaugier in seasons 3–5) is an NYPD homicide detective and, in season five, girlfriend of Detective Don Flack. She is the third generation in a family of police officers, and the first female. Her badge Is #9521, it was her father's before it was hers. In the season five finale (5.25 "Pay Up") she is shot during a kidnapping and dies during surgery. Flack is badly shaken by her death, which leads to his breakdown in the next season.
- Stanton Gerrard (played by Carmen Argenziano in seasons 3–4) is a tough, no-nonsense cop. At first he is a Captain and Flack's boss. Later he is promoted to Deputy Inspector and uses his position to occasionally interfere with and/or browbeat Mac and his team (3.19 "A Daze of Wine and Roaches" and 3.21 "Past Imperfect"). In episode 4.18 "Admissions", Gerrard shoots and kills a suspect who admitted to raping his 17-year-old daughter.
- Brigham Sinclair (played by Mykelti Williamson in seasons 3–6) is the Chief of Detectives who first appears when he and Stanton Gerrard lead an internal investigation of Mac Taylor after Mac allegedly throws a serial killer, Clay Dobson, off the roof of a building (3.22 "Cold Reveal").
- Jamie Lovato (played by Natalie Martinez in season 9) is a detective in the Homicide Squad. She transferred over from Narcotics when her cover was blown. She works, and flirts, with Flack. By midseason they begin a relationship.

=== Family and friends ===
- Reed Garrett (played by Kyle Gallner in seasons 3–4 & 6) is the son of Claire Conrad Taylor, Mac's late wife. Claire had given birth to Reed when she was very young, and had given him up for adoption long before she met Mac. At first, Reed mistakenly believes that Stella Bonasera is Claire, having observed the close friendship between Mac and Stella. After he learns the truth, Reed is reluctant to connect with Mac, because Mac is not his biological father (308 "Consequences"). Still, Reed knows that Mac is the only link he has to knowing more about his mother. In episode 3.10 "Sweet 16", Mac visits Reed at his home for Thanksgiving, and gives him photos of Claire. Reed and Mac bond further during the events of episode 3.15 "Some Buried Bones", in which Reed's friend at college is murdered and Reed himself is assaulted. Reed also learns that the body of his mother has, to date, never been recovered from the World Trade Center site. During season four, Reed is shown to have become interested in journalism, putting him at odds with Mac while trying to follow a case concerning a serial killer who uses a taxicab as the murder weapon. He is shown getting unknowingly into the killer's cab at the end of episode 4.19 "Personal Foul", but the driver does not kill him and instead gives Reed information on the "Cabbie Killer" to post on his blog. In episode 4.20 "Taxi", he is kidnapped by the "Cabbie Killer", who wishes to use Reed to get his message across to the public. He is bound and gagged with duct tape and carried in the trunk of the taxi along with another victim. By leaving hints in his online blog, Mac and the team are able to rescue him. Reed returns in episode 6.17 "Pot of Gold", when he requests Mac's help in persuading a fellow net journalist to come forward with incriminating evidence pertaining to a gold fraud case. He is shown to be less aggressive in pursuing news due to his kidnapping by the Cabbie Killer and the psychological trauma he received.
- Rikki Sandoval (played by Jacqueline Piñol in season 4) is Danny's neighbor. Danny actually is better acquainted with her son Ruben than Rikki herself, serving as a sort of big brother to Ruben. On the day that Danny takes Ruben to church to have his bicycle blessed they run afoul of a bodega robbery and Ruben is killed by accident (4.11 "Child's Play"). Looking to assuage his guilt, Danny begins an affair with Rikki, putting great stress on his relationship with Lindsay. Though Lindsay never mentions or implies that she knows of the affair, Danny believes that she does know. Rikki decides to leave New York for a fresh start, concurring with Danny that their fling had been a mistake (4.19 "Personal Foul").
- Jordan Gates (played by Jessalyn Gilsig in season 4) is the New York City mayor's Criminal Justice Coordinator. Her funding helps to rebuild the lab after it is destroyed in a bomb explosion (3.24 "Snow Day"). She has had a good relationship with Mac ever since he helped keep her abusive ex-husband from stalking her. When her ex-husband hires an expert serial killer known only as "Suspect X" to kill Jordan, Mac and his team are able to stop her from succeeding (415 "DOA For A Day").
- Quinn Shelby (played by Kristen Dalton in season 4) is a CSI from one of the New Jersey crime labs. She arrives to do a required review of the Crime Lab. Years ago, she had a romantic interest in Mac Taylor and revealed that Mac had kissed her but he regretted it and never took it further out of loyalty to his wife.
- Samantha Flack (played by Kathleen Munroe in seasons 5, 8–9) is Flack's troubled sister who often gets mixed up in illegal activities (5.01 "Veritas"). Flack has tried numerous times to connect with her but Sam always pushes him away (5.07 "Dead Inside"). In episode 805 "Air Apparent", he finds that she can't get work because of her previous arrests and so he calls in a favor and gets her an interview with NYPD Media Relations. Sam and Flack are both shown to be close to their grandmother and in episode 905 "Misconceptions" even with their differences, they go together to scatter their late father's ashes in Yankee Stadium.
- Terrence Davis (played by Nelly in seasons 5–6) is a former gang member turned confidential informant for Flack. Flack has utilized Terrence's services many times until he signs off Terrence as his CI following the death of his girlfriend, Jessica Angell. Jess's death drives Flack down a path of drinking and when Flack gets into a drunken fight with some thugs on the subway, Terrence shows up and saves Flack's life. Terrence later turns him over to Mac to get him some help (6.08 "Cuckoo's Nest").
- Christine Whitney (played by Megan Dodds in seasons 8–9) is an old friend and new girlfriend of Mac Taylor. Back when Mac was still in uniform his partner, Stan, was Christine's brother. Stan was killed on the job. Christine runs a small restaurant and spent a lot of time with Mac when he was recovering from being shot (818 "Near Death"). Mac finally tells her he loves her in episode 907 "CLUE: SI".
- Russ Josephson (played by David James Elliott in season 7) is Jo's ex-husband and an FBI Special Agent.

=== Notable villains ===
- Sonny Sassone (played by Michael DeLuise in seasons 1–2) is the leader of a street gang called the Tanglewood Boys and is responsible for several murders. He comes across a Tanglewood poser named Paul Montenassi, beats him to death with a signed baseball bat, and sands off the fake Tanglewood tattoo so that Paul will not be tied to his gang. He is arrested by Mac and states that he will beat this murder rap (1.13 "Tanglewood"). He is not convicted. A year later he comes under investigation again after one of his accomplices confesses to where a body is buried. Danny's DNA is found on a cigarette near the body. Danny's brother, Louie, confronts Sonny about the murder while wearing a wire to exonerate his brother. Sonny beats Louie into a coma, unaware of the wire. The CSIs manage to finally nail Sonny for murder and attempted murder (2.20 "Run Silent, Run Deep").
- D.J. Pratt (played by Chad Williams in season 2) is a painter who rapes women. Aiden is able to find DNA evidence against him for one victim, Regina Bowen, but at trial he is acquitted because Regina refuses to testify (2.01 "Summer in the City"). When he attacks her again, Aiden is fired by Mac for possibly tampering with evidence in his case (2.02 "Grand Murder at Central Station"). Later, Pratt rapes and kills Lilian Stanwick. Stella and Lindsay find Pratt's DNA along with another man's but can't prove the sex was forced so he walks again (2.18 "Live or Let Die"). He realizes he is being followed and sends his lawyer to the crime lab to get them to stop. This prompts Mac to look at old rape cases and finds out that there are five cases where there was no physical evidence or the DNA was too degraded but at least one of these cases is a match to Pratt's MO (2.22 "Stealing Home"). When Pratt realizes it is Aiden who is following him he decides to kill her. He steals a car, lures her out to a parking lot, kills her with his fists, and sets the car on fire in an attempt to destroy the evidence. Unfortunately for him, Aiden manages to leave behind enough evidence that is fire-proof for her former colleagues to convict Pratt of her murder (2.23 "Heroes").
- Frankie Mala (played by Ed Quinn in season 2) is a sculptor and art collector, and Stella's one-time boyfriend. Stella finds out that Frankie has been taping them having sex and posting the footage online, so she ends the relationship (2.20 "Run Silent, Run Deep"). Frankie begins stalking Stella and later breaks into her apartment. He ties Stella up and plans to kill her, but she is able to escape and is forced to shoot him in self-defense (2.21 "All Access").
- Shane Casey (played by Edward Furlong in seasons 3, 6–7) is a young man embroiled in a case where a serial killer uses the codes and stories found on a series of trendy T-shirts as inspiration for his grisly killings (3.04 "Hung Out To Dry"). He is also known for being Danny Messer's nemesis. Shane is believed to be targeting Sheldon Hawkes and others who put his brother, Ian, away for a crime of which Shane thought he was innocent. On the day of the sentencing, Ian hanged himself. In episode 3.11 "Raising Shane", Shane frames Hawkes for a robbery and murder, saying he will give the evidence to clear Hawkes if the team will prove Ian was innocent. He demands to talk to Danny Messer alone, and during this confrontation, Danny brings proof that Ian did indeed commit the crimes for which he was convicted. Thoroughly devastated, Shane is then easily arrested for murdering the man he had hired to impersonate Hawkes. Three seasons later in episode 6.13 "Flag on the Play" his print is found on Danny's grandfather's dogtags, which had been stolen along with his badge (6.12 "Criminal Justice"). In 6.19 "Redemptio", Shane hatches a plot to escape prison, by threatening a prison guard to work for him and using a set of police uniforms, along with Danny's badge, to bluff his way out. Although Hawkes discovers this plan while visiting a death row inmate, he is unable to stop Shane from leaving the penitentiary premises during a prison riot. In episode 6.23 "Vacation Getaway", Casey tracks Danny (now married with a child) to Amagansett, New York. Holding Danny at gunpoint in the lighthouse, Casey is blinded when the Coast Guard remotely activates the light, and after a brief fight, Danny knocks him through the lighthouse window, where (despite Danny trying to save him) he falls, presumably, to his death. However, Casey survives and later manages to enter Danny's apartment. The episode ends with Casey holding Danny's daughter Lucy in one arm, and a gun in his other hand. The screen fades to black, and then a gunshot is heard. In episode 7.01 "The 34th Floor" it is confirmed that Lindsay shot him dead, ending his reign of terror on the Messer family once and for all.
- Clay Dobson (played by Joey Lawrence in season 3) is a serial rapist and murderer. He was put in prison in 2002 with the help of Dean Truby. After Truby is arrested (3.08 "Consequences"), Dobson is released from prison. He restarts his killing spree, but when cornered, kills himself in front of Mac by jumping from a roof (3.21 "Past Imperfect"). The investigation into his death has Mac being suspected of murdering Dobson (3.22 "Cold Reveal") until he is cleared of all charges (3.23 "...Comes Around").
- Andrew "Drew" Bedford aka 333 Stalker (played by Kerr Smith in season 4) is a charming and wealthy man who meets Stella Bonasera while she is working on a case involving antique coins (4.02 "The Deep"). Drew pursues Stella, seemingly wanting to have a relationship with her; he often follows her and sends her unusual gifts. Despite Drew's persistence, Stella has no interest in getting involved with him. Drew turns out to be the brother of one of Mac Taylor's childhood friends and is only trying to get close to Stella so that he can have access to Mac. Drew has held a grudge against Mac for being too scared to intervene in a confrontation that killed Drew's brother 30 years prior. Drew calls Mac every morning at 3:33 a.m. and leaves meticulously planned clues, all of which lead Mac home to Chicago, where he revisits the tragedy (4.10 "The Thing About Heroes..."). After kidnapping Mac and trying to get him killed, along with anyone who tries to rescue him, Drew is apprehended and Mac rescued.
- John Curtis (played by Jason Wiles in season 8) is a man accused of raping a woman, Ali Rand, in New York City. Curtis, a long-time nemesis of Jo Danville, turns out to be the man previously accused of raping Senator Matthews' daughter in Washington, D.C. when Jo was in the FBI and handling the case. Curtis was acquitted then, when an error was made by Agent Frank Waters during the investigation and later discovered by Jo, who was required to notify the defense. The senator and his daughter are in town and they visit the crime lab. Because this case is personal to Jo, Mac doesn't let her work it. The team discovers that Senator Matthews and Ali Rand set up the rape to frame Curtis, but didn't get the science right and Curtis gets out on bail. He attacks Jo and another former victim. Though injured, Jo shoots him dead.

== Notable guest stars ==
CSI: NY has cast a number of celebrity guest stars, including:

- Dianna Agron
- Daniella Alonso
- Mädchen Amick
- Criss Angel
- Ed Asner
- Alex Max Band
- Matt Barr
- Ryan Bittle
- Arden Cho
- Jamie Chung
- Kim Coates
- Sasha Cohen
- Misha Collins
- Michael Cudlitz
- James Badge Dale
- Chris Daughtry
- Jackson Davis
- Kat Dennings
- Michael Clarke Duncan
- Peter Fonda
- Robert Forster
- Cassidy Freeman
- Melissa Fumero
- Edward Furlong
- Nelly Furtado
- Kyle Gallner
- Aimee Garcia
- Josh Groban
- Brian Hallisay
- Taylor Handley
- Kam Heskin
- Finola Hughes
- Nana Kagga
- Kim Kardashian
- Kid Rock
- Mia Kirshner
- Casey LaBow
- Andrew Lawrence
- Joey Lawrence
- Rachelle Lefevre
- Kellan Lutz
- Lee Majors
- Meghan Markle
- Maroon 5
- Natalie Martinez
- Matias Masucci
- Marlee Matlin
- Neal McDonough
- John McEnroe
- Joey McIntyre
- Bonnie McKee
- Michaela McManus
- Ryan McPartlin
- Katharine McPhee
- Vanessa Minnillo
- Pat Monahan and Train
- Rob Morrow
- Kathleen Munroe
- Nelly
- Craig T. Nelson
- Judd Nelson
- Jaime Ray Newman
- Ne-Yo
- Edward James Olmos
- Julia Ormond
- Jenna Ortega
- Danica Patrick
- Robert Picardo
- Danny Pino
- Crystal Reed
- Carlo Rota
- Deanna Russo
- Rex Ryan
- Charles Shaughnessy
- Brandon Scott
- Mark Sheppard
- Joe Sikora
- Ashlee Simpson
- Octavia Spencer
- SuicideGirls
- D. B. Sweeney
- T. J. Thyne
- Skeet Ulrich
- La La Vasquez
- Emmanuelle Vaugier
- Pete Wentz
- Paul Wesley
- Mykelti Williamson
- Rumer Willis
- Shailene Woodley

In 2009, guest star Ed Asner received an Emmy nomination for his role in episode 5.22, "Yahrzeit".
