= CSI: NY season 7 =

CSI: NY
- Season 7
- Season 7 U.S. DVD cover
- No. of episodes: 22

Release
- Original network: CBS
- Original release: September 24, 2010 – May 13, 2011

Season chronology
- ← Previous; Season 6 Next → Season 8

The seventh season of CSI: NY originally aired on CBS between September 2010 and May 2011. It consisted of 22 episodes. Its regular time slot moved to Fridays at 9pm/8c. The premiere, "The 34th Floor", concluded the story from the previous season's cliffhanger finale, "Vacation Getaway".

The season introduced a new regular character, Detective Jo Danville, played by Sela Ward for the rest of the series, after detective Stella Bonasera moves to New Orleans to head up their crime lab. Stella’s actress, Melina Kanakaredes, chose to leave the series and spend more time with her family rather than renew her contract.

CSI: NY – The Seventh Season was released on DVD in the U.S. on September 27, 2011.

== Cast ==
=== Main cast ===
- Gary Sinise as Mac Taylor
- Sela Ward as Jo Danville
- Carmine Giovinazzo as Danny Messer
- Anna Belknap as Lindsay Messer
- Robert Joy as Sid Hammerback
- A. J. Buckley as Adam Ross
- Hill Harper as Sheldon Hawkes
- Eddie Cahill as Don Flack

== Episodes ==
No. overall	No. in season	Title	Directed by	Written by	Original release date	US viewers (millions)
141	1	"The 34th Floor"	Duane Clark	John Dove & Pam Veasey	September 24, 2010	10.35
Following the cliffhanger of "Vacation Getaway", Lindsay Monroe Messer kills Shane Casey. Five months later she is awarded a Combat Cross. She and her team return to the crime lab where Stella's replacement, Jo Danville has found the body of Sarah Nelson, a secretary in an architect's office on the floor below the crime lab. They determine she was killed by a pair of scissors. Later, they hear of a second victim from the office, Theodore Westwick, who survived an attack. After finding a dropped pair of scissors, the CSIs match the fingerprints to a high-end thief. When Danny and Flack catch him, he claims that he broke into the office and witnessed Westwick murder Nelson, and later defended himself when Westwick attempted to kill him, too. Danville and Hawkes prove the burglars claim. When Mac's team arrives to arrest Westwick he pulls a gun to make Mac and Flack shoot him.
142	2	"Unfriendly Chat"	Eric Laneuville	Trey Callaway	October 1, 2010	9.70
A beautiful young woman is strangled to death while she is having an online chat with Adam Ross. The victim is 20-year-old Sass Dumonde (Amra Silajdžić), a French music student, who is actually studying in New York City. At the crime scene, the team finds that the murderer took one of her laptops, which belonged to Draga Financial, an investment firm under investigation by the FBI. Hawkes determines the face behind the mask of the killer is an employee of the firm. When Mac arrives at his office he finds him gone and targeting Adam. When the murderer tries to kill Adam, Adam is able to subdue him while the police arrive. In the end, Mac, having learned Adam previously hacked into Draga's system against his permission, puts him on a three-day suspension.
143	3	"Damned If You Do"	Christine Moore	Zachary Reiter	October 8, 2010	9.89
A married couple are found beaten in their home, with the husband dead and wife barely alive. The woman identifies her son, Billy Travers, as the attacker. However, there are a series of complications in the case. First, the mother is suffering from amnesia, and later does not recall who attacked her. Next, a convict facing a life sentence who broke out confesses to the crime; is this a ploy, or is the real attacker still on the loose?
144	4	"Sangre Por Sangre"	Norberto Barba	Aaron Rahsaan Thomas	October 15, 2010	9.57
Members of El Puño, a Puerto Rican gang, are found murdered only days after the release of its founder, Luther Devarro (Edward James Olmos), whom Mac arrested for murder several years earlier. Believing a rival gang is responsible, Mac asks Devarro for help in solving the murders, concerned that the NYPD may have a gang war on their hands.
145	5	"Out of the Sky"	Nathan Hope	Christopher Silber	October 22, 2010	10.25
Danny's former partner is involved in a jewel robbery at the home of a powerful defense attorney.
146	6	"Do Not Pass Go"	David Jackson	Adam Targum	October 29, 2010	10.44
When a badly decomposed body is found in an abandoned car on a rooftop, Mac and his team must go up against a killer who is using the parents of his victim to manipulate crime scenes.
147	7	"Hide Sight"	Alex Zakrzewski	Bill Haynes	November 5, 2010	10.58
When a rooftop sniper with exploding bullets starts killing, Mac's duty to protect and serve conflicts with his superior's orders concerning civilians' right-to-know. Mac has a history with the main suspect. Sid is injured during an autopsy.
148	8	"Scared Stiff"	Marshall Adams	Kim Clements	November 12, 2010	10.02
A park runner tries to escape from her killer. When her body is discovered an autopsy reveals that she had literally been scared to death. Soon afterward, a second victim who could be connected to the case is discovered, who turns out to be Chief Carver's missing sister.
149	9	"Justified"	Jeff T. Thomas	John Dove	November 19, 2010	10.18
Mac continues to investigate Chief Carver's sister's death, which leads him to suspect the chief himself.
150	10	"Shop Till You Drop"	Skipp Sudduth	Teleplay by : Trey Callaway & Aaron Rahsaan Thomas; Story by : Adam Targum & Christopher Silber	December 3, 2010	10.13
A department store manager is found dead inside his store's holiday window display. Several employees had motive.
151	11	"To What End?"	Eric Laneuville	Pam Veasey & Zachary Reiter	January 7, 2011	9.45
A man dressed in a full clown costume shoots a bakery owner. The case connects to an old one of Flack's. Jo's ex-husband shows up.
152	12	"Holding Cell"	Scott White	Bill Haynes	January 14, 2011	9.56
A Catalan club promoter is killed and Mac battles with a detective from Barcelona to solve the case. Things get personal when the relationship between the detective and victim is revealed and Mac wonders why the detective believes the case is a homicide, despite evidence pointing to suicide.
153	13	"Party Down"	Skip Sudduth	Adam Targum	February 4, 2011	9.32
When a tractor-trailer is found at the bottom of the Hudson River carrying exclusive party guests, Mac and his team must solve the mystery.
154	14	"Smooth Criminal"	Scott White	Aaron Rahsaan Thomas	February 11, 2011	9.71
When a charming and suave hitman (Ne-Yo) goes loose in the city, a hidden conspiracy involving counterfeit prescription drugs is uncovered.
155	15	"Vigilante"	Frederick E. O. Toye	Christopher Silber	February 18, 2011	10.65
When a serial rapist is found murdered in the same manner as his victims, the CSIs weigh a feeling of justice against their sense of duty to pursue the killer.
156	16	"The Untouchable"	Vikki Williams	Kim Clements	February 25, 2011	10.89
The CSIs investigate the murder of a conspiracy-obsessed woman whose ramblings seem to contain some truth.
157	17	"Do or Die"	Matt Earl Beesley	Matthew Levine	March 11, 2011	10.60
The CSIs dive into a highly competitive world to catch a killer who murdered a popular girl in a Manhattan private school. However, the school is worse than they think it is.
158	18	"Identity Crisis"	Mike Vejar Jr.	Pam Veasey	April 1, 2011	10.36
When her adopted daughter becomes the key witness in a murder investigation, Jo faces a conflict between her personal and professional lives.
159	19	"Food for Thought"	Oz Scott	Trey Callaway	April 8, 2011	9.75
Mac and his team investigate a murder at a SoHo food festival where Hawkes and his girlfriend are two of many witnesses.
160	20	"Nothing for Something"	Eric Laneuville	John Dove	April 29, 2011	9.19
During a murder investigation the team stumbles on a missing person case. An ex-convict seems to be stalking Mac and it ties to his old partner (Peter Fonda).
161	21	"Life Sentence"	Jeffrey Hunt	Christopher Silber & Adam Targum	May 6, 2011	9.53
The crime lab is attacked. Danny and Mac are investigated by Internal Affairs after killing a suspect. Mac's old partner and the ex-con reveal what happened years earlier.
162	22	"Exit Strategy"	Allison Liddi-Brown	Zachary Reiter & Bill Haynes	May 13, 2011	10.44
After a near-death experience Mac returns to his final unsolved case, a bodega robbery in 2002. New evidence suggests a young girl was kidnapped during the crime, so Mac and the team launch a country-wide manhunt to find her. She is reunited with her mother, and Mac tells Jo he believes he has done his share of good.
