= CSI: NY season 4 =

Season of American television series

CSI: NY
- Season 4
- Season 4 U.S. DVD cover
- No. of episodes: 21

Release
- Original network: CBS
- Original release: September 26, 2007 – May 21, 2008

Season chronology
- ← Previous; Season 3 Next → Season 5

The fourth season of CSI: NY originally aired on CBS between September 2007 and May 2008. It consisted of 21 episodes, only 14 of which were completed before the Writer's Strike. Seven more episodes were made after the strike, and they began airing in April 2008. Its regular time slot continued on Wednesdays at 10pm/9c.

CSI: NY – The Fourth Season was released on DVD in the U.S. on September 23, 2008.

== Cast ==
=== Main cast ===
- Gary Sinise as Mac Taylor
- Melina Kanakaredes as Stella Bonasera
- Carmine Giovinazzo as Danny Messer
- Anna Belknap as Lindsay Monroe
- Hill Harper as Sheldon Hawkes
- Eddie Cahill as Don Flack

=== Recurring cast ===
- Robert Joy as Sid Hammerback
- A. J. Buckley as Adam Ross
- Emmanuelle Vaugier as Jessica Angell
- Claire Forlani as Peyton Driscoll (voice only)
- Kyle Gallner as Reed Garrett

== Episodes ==
| No. overall | No. in season | Title | Directed by | Written by | Original release date | US viewers (millions) |
|---|---|---|---|---|---|---|
| 72 | 1 | "Can You Hear Me Now?" | David Von Ancken | Zachary Reiter & Pam Veasey | September 26, 2007 | 12.72 |
While investigating the death of a guard, Mac and the team find human blood on the crown of the Statue of Liberty, leading them in a race against time to save a famous musician from death at the hands of a vigilante.
| 73 | 2 | "The Deep" | Oz Scott | Wendy Battles | October 3, 2007 | 12.69 |
A sailboat race to Staten Island takes an unexpected tack when one of the boats nearly collides with a dead scuba diving instructor. Autopsy reveals this was no accident and trace evidence leads the CSIs underwater to an artificial reef made of discarded subway cars stacked up at the bottom of the East River where they find the dead diving partner of the first victim.
| 74 | 3 | "You Only Die Once" | Jonathan Glassner | Sam Humphrey | October 10, 2007 | 13.43 |
The CSIs investigate a James Bond-esque gang of thieves who use high tech methods to steal personal account information from computers and phones before fleeing the scenes in a customized Batmobile-type car. When one of the thieves turns up dead, Mac and the team have to determine if one of the gang's victims sought retribution or if it was a double cross by one of the thieves. Mac mentions the harassing calls he's been receiving every morning at 3:33 am.
| 75 | 4 | "Time's Up" | Rob Bailey | Trey Callaway | October 17, 2007 | 13.99 |
A dying man confesses to a murder 24 hours before it happens and Mac and Hawkes investigate the possibility of time travel. Stella, Danny and Lindsay investigate a case of a woman dying due to complications from a test drug that was switched with her asthma inhaler medication. Meanwhile, Mac encourages Stella to give the guy from the antique store a shot and he gets a letter from Peyton breaking up with him.
| 76 | 5 | "Down the Rabbit Hole" | Christine Moore | Sam Humphrey & Peter M. Lenkov | October 24, 2007 | 13.82 |
A murder victim bears a striking resemblance to a well-known avatar in the online role-playing game Second Life. Mac is forced to enter the game himself to solve the mystery surrounding her death. The assassin (Suspect X) escapes.
| 77 | 6 | "Boo" | Joe Dante | Peter M. Lenkov & Daniele Nathanson | October 31, 2007 | 13.40 |
Danny and Lindsay investigate a mass murder at the infamous Amityville Horror house. Before Lindsay can close the case, she is warned by someone to leave the house, or she will be in great danger. Meanwhile, Stella and Mac investigate the death of a man in the middle of the street. Autopsy reveals the victim may have died before, and evidence leads the CSI to a voodoo shop owned by Josephine Delacroix (Nana Kagga).
| 78 | 7 | "Commuted Sentences" | Oz Scott | John Dove | November 7, 2007 | 12.92 |
Danny, Hawkes and Lindsay investigate the death of a woman shot dead on the steps of the Metropolitan Museum of Art while Mac and Stella investigate the death of a millionaire stabbed to death in Madison Square Park. As the investigation goes on, the CSIs find out both cases are connected.
| 79 | 8 | "Buzzkill" | Jeffrey Hunt | Jill Abbinanti | November 14, 2007 | 13.13 |
When a supermodel is found dead in a giant martini glass on a Times Square billboard, Stella and Lindsay follow the evidence in search of the party crasher. When they learn she was killed by a poisonous jellyfish, they follow the trail and learn that the supermodel was not the target. Mac, Danny and Hawkes investigate a bar robbery which leaves one person dead and another critically injured. Meanwhile, Stella has a date with the man from the antique store.
| 80 | 9 | "One Wedding and a Funeral" | Rob Bailey | Barbie Kligman | November 21, 2007 | 14.56 |
Mac, Danny and Hawkes investigates a groom murdered on his wedding day, found stuffed and wrapped like a wedding present. Stella and Lindsay investigate when a jigsaw covered in blood is left on Stella's car.
| 81 | 10 | "The Thing About Heroes" | Anthony Hemingway | Pam Veasey | November 28, 2007 | 14.19 |
Mac goes home to Chicago, trying to solve the mystery of the 333 stalker. Meanwhile, back in New York, the 333 stalker targets the rest of the CSI team while they investigate the death of a train conductor.
| 82 | 11 | "Child's Play" | Jeffrey Hunt | Trey Callaway & Pam Veasey | December 12, 2007 | 14.36 |
Flack and Stella investigate a man killed by an exploding cigar. Danny and his neighbor Ruben stumble on a bodega robbery and the boy is killed by a stray bullet. Danny is filled with guilt because he was supposed to be responsible for the child.
| 83 | 12 | "Happily Never After" | Marshall Adams | Daniele Nathanson & Noah Nelson | January 9, 2008 | 11.71 |
A notorious hotel owner known for her meanness is found dead under an ice sculpture, and the clues to the death of a second woman who fell to her death onto a school bus can be found in the book "Peter Pan."
| 84 | 13 | "All in the Family" | Rob Bailey | Wendy Battles | January 23, 2008 | 11.51 |
While investigating the shooting of a college student outside a flower shop, the CSIs are called to the murder of a family court judge who has many enemies. Meanwhile, Danny's neighbor Rikki steals his gun to go after the bodega robber who caused her son's death.
| 85 | 14 | "Playing with Matches" | Christine Moore | Bill Haynes | February 6, 2008 | 10.16 |
A badly-burned corpse turns out to belong to an underground street luge racer. The DNA of a man already in prison is found on the body of a young woman discovered in a new high-tech public toilet.
| 86 | 15 | "DOA for a Day" | Christine Moore | John Dove & Peter M. Lenkov | April 2, 2008 | 12.85 |
The CSIs are led to an abandoned warehouse where they believe they have found the body of New York's most wanted killer–Suspect X, but evidence suggests the body is that of an innocent woman who was used by Suspect X to fake her own death. (This concludes the story begun in "Down The Rabbit Hole".)
| 87 | 16 | "Right Next Door" | Rob Bailey | Pam Veasey | April 9, 2008 | 12.38 |
Stella's apartment complex is on fire and she tries to rescue people. After the fire is extinguished, the team finds a dead body inside the building.
| 88 | 17 | "Like Water for Murder" | Anthony Hemingway | Sam Humphrey | April 16, 2008 | 13.43 |
The CSI team inspects a twisted trail of evidence when a saleswoman washes up on Rockaway Beach along with a dead shark. The team realizes they are dealing with a serial killer when a second body washes up on the shore. Mac discovers the killer is a taxi driver and he is killing his victims by carbon monoxide poisoning from inside his cab. The Crime Lab is evaluated.
| 89 | 18 | "Admissions" | Rob Bailey | Zachary Reiter | April 30, 2008 | 11.51 |
When a guidance counselor is murdered at an exclusive private school, the mayor orders Mac and his team to drop everything they're working on and find out what happened. Mac is frustrated because he can't devote the hours or personnel to finding the "Cabbie Killer".
| 90 | 19 | "Personal Foul" | David Von Ancken | Trey Callaway | May 7, 2008 | 12.73 |
As the search for the "Cabbie Killer" continues, riding a cab gets very deadly. The team must figure out how to keep New York City safe. Also, Danny, Lindsay, and Flack investigate the murder of a man who made a half-court shot during a basketball game that both Danny and Flack were attending. Danny and Rikki's relationship ends.
| 91 | 20 | "Taxi" | Christine Moore | Barbie Kligman & John Dove | May 14, 2008 | 11.86 |
A cab driver is found dead and at first Mac believes they may have found the "Cabbie Killer", possibly killed by vigilantes. But bodies are still piling up and the killer takes Reed hostage. In an effort to save more lives, Reed uses his blog to reveal crucial details about the killer and their location before time runs out.
| 92 | 21 | "Hostage" | Rob Bailey | Zachary Reiter & Peter M. Lenkov | May 21, 2008 | 11.83 |
A man takes hostages during a failed attempt to rob a bank. The man demands a CSI to come in and prove he wasn't the person who fatally shot the bank manager. Mac goes inside the bank and the rest of the team tries to unscramble the clues Mac is able to give them, but nothing is as it seems.
