= CSI: NY season 6 =

CSI: NY
- Season 6
- Season 6 U.S. DVD cover
- No. of episodes: 23

Release
- Original network: CBS
- Original release: September 23, 2009 – May 26, 2010

Season chronology
- ← Previous; Season 5 Next → Season 7

The sixth season of CSI: NY originally aired on CBS between September 2009 and May 2010. It consisted of 23 episodes. Its regular time slot continued on Wednesdays at 10:00 pm/9:00 pm Central. The premiere, "Epilogue", concluded the story from the previous season's cliffhanger finale, "Pay Up".

Episode seven, "Hammer Down", was the second part of a three-part crossover with CSI: Miami and CSI: Crime Scene Investigation called CSI: Trilogy.

CSI: NY – The Sixth Season was released on DVD in the U.S. on October 26, 2010.

It's the final season with Melina Kanakaredes as Detective Stella Bonasera. After the season finale, Kanakaredes chose to leave the series and spend more time with her family rather than renew her contract.

== Cast ==
=== Main cast ===
- Gary Sinise as Mac Taylor
- Melina Kanakaredes as Stella Bonasera
- Carmine Giovinazzo as Danny Messer
- Anna Belknap as Lindsay Messer
- Robert Joy as Sid Hammerback
- A. J. Buckley as Adam Ross
- Hill Harper as Sheldon Hawkes
- Eddie Cahill as Don Flack

=== Recurring cast ===
- Claire Forlani as Peyton Driscoll
- Kyle Gallner as Reed Garrett

=== Special guest star ===
- Laurence Fishburne as Raymond Langston

== Episodes ==
No. overall	No. in season	Title	Directed by	Written by	Original release date	US viewers (millions)
118	1	"Epilogue"	David Von Ancken	Pam Veasey	September 23, 2009	15.06
Mac's team is recovering from a drive-by shooting that paralyzed Danny's legs a month earlier when they were at a local bar. Stella and Adam have a one-night stand and a few days later say it should not be repeated.
119	2	"Blacklist"	Duane Clark	Peter M. Lenkov	September 30, 2009	13.16
A killer who is bitter toward the health-care industry murders the CEO of a healthcare system and an oncologist. At the lab Adam finds himself against a highly intelligent tech-savvy suspect as he and Mac race against the clock to identify him. The case turns personal for Mac when the suspect calls and taunts him by mentioning the name of Mac's father, who died nearly 20 years earlier.
120	3	"Lat 40° 47' N/Long 73° 58' W"	Matt Earl Beesley	Trey Callaway	October 7, 2009	12.43
A night-shift janitor is found hanged on Ellis Island and the apparent suicide is quickly ruled a homicide. The killer left behind an antique compass as a clue. Later, another compass mailed to Mac points to another murder victim on the opposite end of the city. Mac hires Haylen to work in the lab, much to Adam's dismay.
121	4	"Dead Reckoning"	Scott White	John Dove	October 14, 2009	13.40
A woman confesses to murdering her cheating husband by stabbing him 17 times, but DNA evidence found at the scene suggests that another woman was involved. The investigation also reveals the mystery lady may be involved in a series of other crimes. Flack freezes during an arrest at gunpoint and his behavior is called into question.
122	5	"Battle Scars"	Jeff T. Thomas	Bill Haynes	October 21, 2009	13.01
A rising star in the underground world of street-dancing competitions is murdered in his hotel room shortly after winning a contest and his girlfriend is beaten. The investigation rules out robbery as a motive since the victim's prize money wasn't taken. The chief suspect is a rival dancer who placed second in the competition.
123	6	"It Happened to Me"	Alex Zakrzewski	Wendy Battles & Pam Veasey	November 4, 2009	12.00
A software-company executive bleeds to death on the street. Hawkes believes he may be responsible because he attended to the victim just hours before in the park as part of a volunteer medical service and didn't think the man's condition was serious. The investigation takes the CSIs into the underground world of "food sploshing" parties, in which participants use food in sensual ways. Hawkes reveals a surprising secret.
124	7	"Hammer Down"	Scott Lautanen	Peter M. Lenkov & Pam Veasey	November 11, 2009	14.51
Ray Langston of the Las Vegas crime lab follows a human-trafficking ring that specializes in black-market organ harvesting to New York, where he assists Mac in attempting to free a hostage taken by the criminal group. This episode continues a crossover with CSI: Miami and CSI: Crime Scene Investigation that begins on "Bone Voyage" and concludes on "The Lost Girls".
125	8	"Cuckoo's Nest"	Jeffrey Hunt	Zachary Reiter & Aaron Rahsaan Thomas	November 18, 2009	13.62
The "Compass Killer" (Skeet Ulrich) claims his third victim when a body plummets from the 59th Street Bridge. A compass pointing east is discovered near the body. Terrence Davis saves Flack's life on the subway when he is attacked.
126	9	"Manhattanhenge"	Matt Earl Beesley	Trey Callaway	November 25, 2009	12.68
Mac and his team discover the home of the "Compass Killer" and attempt to save the madman's fourth victim.
127	10	"Death House"	Norberto Barba	JP Donahue & Kevin Polay	December 9, 2009	12.97
Responding to a call for help from 911, the CSI's discover a nearly 100-year-old corpse. After Stella narrowly avoids death by the same trap that killed the victim, the CSI's must then figure out the riddles of the penthouse to locate the 911 caller, and the caller's girlfriend.
128	11	"Second Chances"	Eric Laneuville	John Dove	December 16, 2009	13.55
The team learns that a former drug addict, who had been clean for two years, has been hit by a car and it seems that a two million dollar life insurance policy was behind his death. On the other hand, they have a hard time figuring out how a second victim died because of identity theft and if the two deaths are linked. Kim Kardashian, Pat Monahan, and the other members of Monahan's band Train guest star.
129	12	"Criminal Justice"	Christine Moore	Bill Haynes	January 13, 2010	14.03
While investigating a stabbing, the case takes a turn when the team discovers planted evidence at the crime scene. A person in authority is responsible. Danny's badge is stolen.
130	13	"Flag on the Play"	Jeffrey Hunt	Wendy Battles	January 20, 2010	13.54
The quarterback of a women's football team is found murdered in the locker room with traces of lidocaine in her system.
131	14	"Sanguine Love"	Norberto Barba	Carmine Giovinazzo	February 3, 2010	14.16
The team explore the dark subculture of vampirism after a woman's body is found in Central Park with her blood drained.
132	15	"The Formula"	Matt Earl Beesley	Aaron Rahsaan Thomas	February 10, 2010	12.98
A Formula racing driver is seriously injured after his car explodes during an exhibition race, and later dies in hospital. While the CSIs investigate, they find evidence that the race car had been tampered with. Suspects include his wife, whom he had promised he would retire, his racing rival (Danica Patrick) who had threatened him, a younger racing driver, and his manager.
133	16	"Uncertainty Rules"	Jeff T. Thomas	Zachary Reiter	March 3, 2010	12.35
A man celebrating his 21st birthday is found walking in the street, covered in blood and attacking cars with an axe. The CSIs find four bodies (two of them the man's friends, the others two unknown girls) in the man's hotel room, but soon they prove that the man (who is suffering from LSD-based hallucinations) is innocent. The team must retrace the man's steps through the night so they can find the killer. In the end they find that the girls (who were the ones that dosed the man with LSD) worked for a drug lord and wanted to leave, with the man and his friends meeting them as the girls escaped: the drug lord killed the four victims, which the man witnessed - and Mac ends up saving him when the drug lord tries to kill him.
134	17	"Pot of Gold"	Eriq La Salle	Trey Callaway	March 10, 2010	11.07
Two young journalists are murdered while investigating a story about gold fraud on the eve of St. Patrick's Day. The CSIs must find the clue at the end of the rainbow.
135	18	"Rest in Peace, Marina Garito"	Allison Liddi-Brown	Pam Veasey	April 7, 2010	10.64
Stella is unconvinced after evidence and an autopsy in a case suggest a woman linked to an unsolved murder committed suicide, and risks her life in an attempt to solve the case.
136	19	"Redemptio"	Steven DePaul	Peter M. Lenkov & Bill Haynes	April 14, 2010	10.85
Hawkes goes to a prison to witness the execution of a death row inmate who murdered his sister. Just as it is about to take place, a guard is killed. This is revealed to be a plot by Shane Casey, who is using the murder as a distraction to escape using Danny's stolen badge. In the process, the prison cells are unlocked, resulting in a prison riot.
137	20	"Tales from the Undercard"	Skipp Sudduth	Aaron Rahsaan Thomas & Steven Fidler	May 5, 2010	10.30
A man is found at a construction site, completely encased in fresh concrete. The investigation takes a more dramatic turn when the victim is revealed to be dressed like a Roman gladiator and participated in underground fighting competitions broadcast over the Internet.
138	21	"Unusual Suspects"	Marshall Adams	John Dove & Wendy Battles	May 12, 2010	11.36
Mac investigates the shooting of a 14-year-old boy, while he and his younger 12-year-old brother walked home from school. Since the younger brother is the only witness, he points out who did it. However, the suspect can only be charged with stealing the boy's watch, and no evidence points to him committing the shooting. As Flack becomes personally involved in the case, the CSIs learn that the brothers robbed a bank to help their mother pay the rent, and it was another suspect who did the shooting.
139	22	"Point of View"	Alex Zakrzewski	Pam Veasey	May 19, 2010	11.30
In a Rear Window-esque episode, Mac recovers in his apartment following a fall from chasing a murderer. During his recovery, he witnesses some mysterious behaviour in the apartment building across the way which leads to a murder involving a former university professor. With the help of visiting Peyton Driscoll, Mac determines the former professor (Gale Harold) is plotting a chemical weapon attack.
140	23	"Vacation Getaway"	Duane Clark	Trey Callaway & Zachary Reiter	May 26, 2010	11.96
Shane Casey is found and arrested, but quickly escapes again. While the team attempts to track him down, Danny and Lindsay take their daughter, Lucy, on vacation to Long Island. After Mac discovers that Casey has murdered his former cell-mate, the team determines Danny is his next target. They are able to locate them at a lighthouse. Casey holds Danny at gunpoint, allowing Lindsay to escape. As police surround the lighthouse, Danny is able to disarm Casey and during the struggle, Casey falls into the ocean. Though his body isn't found, it is assumed he drowned. Later, Danny wakes up in the middle of the night to hear his daughter crying. When he enters her bedroom he finds Casey holding her and a gun. The screen goes black and a gunshot is heard.
