= CSI: NY season 5 =

CSI: NY
- Season 5
- Season 5 U.S. DVD cover
- No. of episodes: 25

Release
- Original network: CBS
- Original release: September 24, 2008 – May 14, 2009

Season chronology
- ← Previous; Season 4 Next → Season 6

The fifth season of CSI: NY originally aired on CBS between September 2008 and May 2009. It consisted of 25 episodes. Its regular time slot continued on Wednesdays at 10:00 pm/9:00 Central. The premiere, "Veritas", concluded the story from the previous season's cliffhanger finale, "Hostage".

CSI: NY – The Fifth Season was released on DVD in the U.S. on September 29, 2009.

== Cast ==
=== Main cast ===
- Gary Sinise as Mac Taylor
- Melina Kanakaredes as Stella Bonasera
- Carmine Giovinazzo as Danny Messer
- Anna Belknap as Lindsay Monroe
- Robert Joy as Sid Hammerback
- A. J. Buckley as Adam Ross
- Hill Harper as Sheldon Hawkes
- Eddie Cahill as Don Flack

=== Recurring cast ===
- Emmanuelle Vaugier as Jessica Angell
- Jonah Lotan as Dr. Marty Pino
- Kathleen Munroe as Samantha Flack

== Episodes ==
No. overall	No. in season	Title	Directed by	Written by	Original release date	US viewers (millions)
93	1	"Veritas"	David Von Ancken	Zachary Reiter & Pam Veasey	September 24, 2008	14.59
Immediately following the previous season finale, the team is investigating the death of a woman named Lauren Salinas, who is linked to the bank robbery. She turns out to be a friend of Flack's sister Samantha. Also, Mac has escaped from the robber who gave his name as Joe, but the bodies are still piling up. So, the team must quickly find "Joe" before he is able to get away.
94	2	"Page Turner"	Frederick E. O. Toye	Trey Callaway	October 1, 2008	14.88
Two people turning up dead with radiation poisoning sparks an urgent investigation before it turns into a deadly outbreak in New York City, when it is tracked down to a book at the NYC Library. Note: Maroon 5 made a guest appearance in this episode.
95	3	"Turbulence"	Matt Earl Beesley	Gary Sinise & Jeremy Littman	October 8, 2008	15.87
When an Air Marshal turns up dead on a flight on which Mac is a passenger, the victim it turns out, isn't a Marshal at all. The real Marshal was killed earlier and his ID stolen. Meanwhile, Stella prepares for a baseball game during which the teams are made up of police against firemen; one with whom she is very friendly. Note: The Who reference: Mac uses the expression "the song is over" to let the perpetrator know that he has found out the truth about the murder.
96	4	"Sex, Lies and Silicone"	Jonathan Glassner	Wendy Battles	October 22, 2008	14.39
When a prominent journalist named Ann Steele turns up dead at a street party, the investigation leads the team to a life-sized silicone doll company. When Mac and the team close the case, Ann Steele is revealed to have had a flash drive on which she kept several damning secrets about several city officials and other prominent people, but at the end of the episode, the flash drive is shown to be stolen by an unknown person.
97	5	"The Cost of Living"	Rob Bailey	John Dove	October 29, 2008	13.75
When an archaeologist ends up dead in a alley, he turns out to be not who everyone thought he was; he was the owner of a rare Greek coin. When Stella is linked to the person who took the coin off the body, her life is threatened.
98	6	"Enough"	Alex Zakrzewski	Zachary Reiter	November 5, 2008	11.80
The team investigate three separate murders, but finds that the three victims were all drug dealers who were due to testify in court, and that the week earlier, they tried ratting out another drug dealer in exchange for freedom, as well as attacking the only witness to their crime. Meanwhile, Adam's job is at risk.
99	7	"Dead Inside"	Christine Moore	Pam Veasey & Daniele Nathanson	November 12, 2008	11.62
When a dead man is found in a cellar, the rest of the crime scene is on a barge floating upriver. The team finds more than they anticipated when delving into the man's life. Meanwhile, Stella gets a threatening phone call about a previous case, and Flack encounters problems caused by his sister's reckless behavior.
100	8	"My Name Is Mac Taylor"	Rob Bailey	Pam Veasey	November 19, 2008	14.12
For the 100th episode, a series of murders is linked by the fact that all the victims are named "Mac Taylor". The New York team struggles against time to hunt down this killer before the worst happens. Note: Chris Daughtry and Rumer Willis guest star in this episode as two of the Mac Taylors.
101	9	"The Box"	Oz Scott	Peter M. Lenkov & Bill Haynes	November 26, 2008	12.30
This is told in a flashback by Danny to two unseen persons about an unidentified body found inside a crushed car. The team must put together the bones to try to figure out who they are and how they died. Though initially unsure of whether to tell him or not, Lindsay reveals to Danny she is pregnant when he sees her at a clinic where the victim had been going.
102	10	"The Triangle"	Jeff T. Thomas	Trey Callaway	December 10, 2008	13.33
When an armored truck is robbed and a guard killed, the team finds themselves hampered by a strange energy field that appeared at the time of the incident. Danny proposes to Lindsay as they continue to explore the future of their relationship, but she turns him down, stating the circumstances are wrong. Mac is questioned by the FBI about the disappearance of Ann Steele's flash drive.
103	11	"Forbidden Fruit"	John Behring	Peter M. Lenkov & Jill Abbinanti	December 17, 2008	13.38
A murder happens during a strange Christmas dinner party involving "mouse brains" and "cod liver oil" of an up-and-coming handbag designer. Meanwhile, a store owner turns up dead from a broken neck in his shop. Ella McBride, the daughter of the victim in "Dead Inside", returns in effort to seek time with Mac, and appears to be infatuated with him, so much so she created fake evidence to see him. After receiving an angry visit from Mac, she later tries to commit suicide from being unable to deal with being alone.
104	12	"Help"	David M. Barrett	Sam Humphrey	January 14, 2009	12.67
A woman is found dead from an accident at a wedding dress sale, but she ends up connected to a woman found dead in a bathtub who was raped. The bathtub victim ties back to Hawkes' ex-girlfriend, who was raped eight years earlier, causing Hawkes and Mac to clash over the case.
105	13	"Rush to Judgement"	Rob Bailey	Wendy Battles	January 21, 2009	11.58
After finding various body parts scattered around the city, the CSIs discover they belong to a wrestling coach at a prestigious NYC high school. The case takes a dramatic turn when Mac and his team examine the coach's computer and discover he emailed a provocative photo of a young boy to students on his wrestling team. Flack is suspended by IAB, following the death of a suspect who was in his custody.
106	14	"She's Not There"	Nelson McCormick	John Dove & Pam Veasey	February 11, 2009	11.94
Two separate cases become one when a man turns up dead and a young woman is missing. They turn out to be connected to a sex slave-trafficking ring in the city. Flack is back on duty after being cleared.
107	15	"The Party's Over"	Oz Scott	Barbie Kligman	February 18, 2009	12.33
Stella's date is interrupted when the body of the deputy mayor falls from the ceiling at a charity fundraiser. Mac takes on Robert Dunbrook, an influential wealthy man, who runs a newspaper. The blue flu causes problems.
108	16	"No Good Deed"	Matt Earl Beesley	Rusty Cundieff & Floyd Byars	February 25, 2009	12.56
A buzzard flying over Manhattan drops a human eyeball into Stella's coffee, and the team searches for the rest of the body. Meanwhile, Mac visits Ella McBride.
109	17	"Green Piece"	Jeffrey Hunt	Zachary Reiter	March 11, 2009	13.63
Adam is injured during a game of street hockey, when a car bomb goes off, killing a woman. The investigation leads to an environmental terrorist group. After talking things through with Mac, Danny takes Lindsay to City Hall under the guise of meeting some friends, and with Stella and Mac as witnesses, the two marry before Lindsay leaves for Montana for a visit.
110	18	"Point of No Return"	Rob Bailey	Peter M. Lenkov & Bill Haynes	March 18, 2009	12.79
The wife of a former medical examiner, Dr. Marty Pino, is found dead, and a white powder near her body helps the CSI team track her killer. The team discovers that the powder is actually heroin made from human bodies. Meanwhile, Stella and Angell continue their search for the killer of the rat fisherman.
111	19	"Communication Breakdown"	John Keris	Trey Callaway	March 25, 2009	12.64
The team has to figure out who killed the chief of a Native American tribe and why. Danny spends the time running boy names through his head and past the rest of the team, though Stella thinks they are having a girl. At the end, he receives a text message from Lindsay, who is still in Montana, saying they are indeed having a girl.
112	20	"Prey"	Marshall Adams	Wendy Battles & Noah Nelson	April 8, 2009	12.50
A voice coach is shot dead, and misleading, planted evidence leads Stella to theorize the killer may be a student at Chelsea University, due to a past lecture she did there. The case takes a baffling turn when it becomes apparent that victim was not so much a victim at all. Katharine McPhee guest-stars as Odessa Shaw/Dana Melton.
113	21	"The Past, Present and Murder"	David Von Ancken	Sam Humphrey & Danielle Nathanson	April 15, 2009	12.14
Robert Dunbrook pushes a man through his high-rise office window. The team has to figure out what happened to the body, all while the case takes many twists and turns along the way.
114	22	"Yahrzeit"	Norberto Barba	Barbie Kligman & Peter M. Lenkov	April 29, 2009	12.50
A jewelry auction takes a deadly turn after one of the appraisers is shot. The case requires the team to try to understand the Holocaust. Mac learns how one member of his family experienced it. Ed Asner guest-stars, and earned a 2009 Emmy nomination for his performance.
115	23	"Greater Good"	Alex Zakrzewski	Pam Veasey	May 6, 2009	13.40
Mac informs an ex-con that he served time for a crime he did not commit, and Lindsay tells Danny, "it's time" for the first CSI baby to be born.
116	24	"Grounds for Deception"	Duane Clark	Melina Kanakaredes	May 13, 2009	12.33
A man is murdered during a theatrical performance with an audience watching. Stella gets in big trouble when Mac finds out she disobeyed an order, and she travels to Greece.
117	25	"Pay Up"	Rob Bailey	Story by : Peter M. Lenkov; Teleplay by : Zachary Reiter & John Dove	May 14, 2009	12.77
Detective Angell is murdered after a deadly group of kidnappers snatches Robert Dunbrook's son while he is being escorted to court. The team is able to find the evidence and rescue the son, and use deadly force on the detective's killer. Later, as they salute Jess in a bar, a drive-by shooting threatens the life of another member.
