= CSI: NY season 2 =

Season of television series

CSI: NY
- Season 2
- Season 2 U.S. DVD cover
- No. of episodes: 24

Release
- Original network: CBS
- Original release: September 28, 2005 – May 17, 2006

Season chronology
- ← Previous; Season 1 Next → Season 3

The second season of CSI: NY originally aired on CBS between September 2005 and May 2006. It consisted of 24 episodes. Its regular time slot continued on Wednesdays at 10pm/9c. The season introduced a new regular character, Lindsay Monroe, after regular Aiden Burn was fired. Vanessa Ferlito, who played Burn, wanted to leave the series to pursue her film career.

Episode 7, "Manhattan Manhunt", was the second part of a two-part crossover with CSI: Miami.

CSI: NY – The Complete Second Season was released on DVD in the U.S. on October 17, 2006.

== Cast ==
=== Main cast ===
- Gary Sinise as Mac Taylor
- Melina Kanakaredes as Stella Bonasera
- Carmine Giovinazzo as Danny Messer
- Vanessa Ferlito as Aiden Burn (episodes 1–2, 23)
- Anna Belknap as Lindsay Monroe (episodes 3–24)
- Hill Harper as Sheldon Hawkes
- Eddie Cahill as Don Flack

=== Recurring cast ===
- Robert Joy as Sid Hammerback
- A. J. Buckley as Adam Ross
- Jonah Lotan as Dr. Marty Pino

=== Special guest star ===
- David Caruso as Horatio Caine

== Episodes ==
No. overall	No. in season	Title	Directed by	Written by	Original release date	Prod. code	US viewers (millions)
24	1	"Summer in the City"	David Von Ancken	Pam Veasey	September 28, 2005	201	13.30
Stella and Danny investigate when a jewelry designer is found dead, wearing the eight million dollar bra he created. Aiden begins to take the rape case she has been working on a little too personally, and is determined to stop the man before he can rape again. Hawkes gets to go into the field for the first time as he assists Mac in investigating the death of a climber who fell from the Empire State Building, which leads the CSIs to another body. Mac and Hawkes use a dead mosquito to identify the culprit.
25	2	"Grand Murder at Central Station"	Scott Lautanen	Zachary Reiter	October 5, 2005	202	14.57
Mac and Hawkes investigate the death of a renowned plastic surgeon killed by lye splashed on his face and hands in the middle of Grand Central Terminal during rush hour. They discover that suspects abound since the doctor had pending lawsuits with patients who sued him for millions. Meanwhile, Stella and Danny delve into the world of cuddle parties while tracking the killer of a blind woman found strangled to death on a Manhattan rooftop. Stella enlists the help of a sculptor to aid her with a facial reconstruction project that will help nab the suspect. Also, Aiden grows frustrated when she's unable to find evidence to finally send a repeat rapist to jail, and the CSIs lose a member of the team.
26	3	"Zoo York"	Norberto Barba	Peter M. Lenkov & Timothy J. Lea	October 12, 2005	203	15.23
Mac and Danny look into the mysterious death of a man torn apart by tigers at the Bronx Zoo, which leads them to both the dead man's meat packing plant as well as his Mafia relatives. A new CSI, Lindsay Monroe, joins the team. Hawkes and Stella are left with the case of a beautiful young debutante found dead on the carousel only hours before her coming out.
27	4	"Corporate Warriors"	Rob Bailey	Andrew Lipsitz	October 19, 2005	204	14.00
Mac and his team investigate when two people who work at the same oil company are murdered in different locations, one at the San Gennaro Festival killed with a pool cue to the heart, the other at Central Park decapitated with the head still attached. Hawkes and Flack team up to investigate a case where a boy died in an apartment fire.
28	5	"Dancing with the Fishes"	John Peters	Eli Talbert	October 26, 2005	205	15.31
Mac, Stella and Flack investigate the death of a young dancer who recently won the lottery, where they soon realize that her death is connected to Lindsay's case, which concerns the death of a Roosevelt Island Tramway operator. Danny and Hawkes look into the murder of a local fish merchant whose son attends a prestigious private school.
29	6	"YoungBlood"	Steven DePaul	Timothy J. Lea	November 2, 2005	206	15.70
When a businessman is found murdered in an elevator, Mac, Danny, Flack and Lindsay's investigation leads them to an agency where very young girls enjoy sexual encounters with much older men. They're soon left trying to determine whether their best lead is a suspect, a witness or the intended victim. Stella and Hawkes investigate the death of a young man found in Central Park who died from an extreme allergic reaction and learn that he had been pretending to be someone he wasn't.
30	7	"Manhattan Manhunt"	Rob Bailey	Elizabeth Devine & Anthony E. Zuiker & Ann Donahue	November 9, 2005	207	19.23
Mac returns to New York with Horatio Caine (David Caruso) as the two attempt to track down Henry Darius, a serial killer who's leaving a trail of bodies in his wake. Horatio has arrived in New York so that he can keep his promise to a young boy whose mother was brutally murdered in Miami, but by the time he and Mac are able to locate Darius he has disappeared again, leaving behind a trail of six more bodies who were having a party in a penthouse. The investigation leads them to uncover a deep, dark secret of one of New York's richest families. After a brief meeting with Darius's psychiatrist, the team realizes they've got a schizophrenic serial killer to track down and stop before it's too late. This episode concludes a crossover with CSI: Miami that begins on "Felony Flight".
31	8	"Bad Beat"	Duane Clark	Zachary Reiter	November 16, 2005	208	15.69
Mac, Stella and Lindsay investigate the murder of a host at a high-stakes poker game after a player was caught cheating and kicked out of the game. Danny and Hawkes follow the clues that lead them to solve the death of a local television weather girl.
32	9	"City of the Dolls"	Norberto Barba	Pam Veasey	November 23, 2005	209	14.52
A teenage boy stumbles upon a dead man in a shop full of dolls. The man was the owner of the doll hospital. The room shows signs of a great struggle with dolls scattered all over the floor. Mac believes the doll the owner was holding could be the key to solving the murder. In an upscale apartment, Stella and Sheldon Hawkes examine the body of a waitress who had cancer. Unlike the other crime scene, this room is in perfect order except for a spilled cup of soup on the counter.
33	10	"Jamalot"	Jonathan Glassner	Andrew Lipsitz	November 30, 2005	210	15.85
Mac, Stella and Lindsay work on the case of a murdered female roller derby player. Danny and Hawkes look into the murder of one of New York's up and coming crop of writers, and discover invisible words on his body, which are taken from his upcoming work.
34	11	"Trapped"	James Whitmore Jr.	Peter M. Lenkov	December 14, 2005	211	16.49
Danny and Stella are forced to find innovative ways to process a crime scene when Danny is trapped inside a panic room with the victim, a paranoid millionaire, who was the only person with the security code. As a locksmith works to cut through the titanium doors, the CSIs rush to process the evidence before it is compromised. Meanwhile, Mac, Hawkes and Lindsay investigate the brutal murder of an exotic dancer who was killed by being pushed on a burning hot klieg light.
35	12	"Wasted"	Jeff T. Thomas	Pam Veasey & Bill Haynes	January 18, 2006	212	15.55
Mac, Danny and Hawkes investigate the death of a runway model who collapsed during a fashion show. When a second model is found bludgeoned to death the three believe there's something more sinister going on. Meanwhile, Stella, Flack and Lindsay begin an investigation when a terminally ill patient confesses to the murder of his doctor.
36	13	"Risk"	Rob Bailey	John Dove & Anthony E. Zuiker	January 25, 2006	213	14.89
Danny, on his way home after a long shift, discovers the body of a young man on the subway tracks. Mac and Lindsay try to determine if the young man died after a reckless subway surfing session or if he was merely dumped on the tracks. Meanwhile, Stella and Sheldon try to discover if a stockbroker who was found hanging by a telephone cable from the window of the 40th floor of a building committed suicide or was murdered.
37	14	"Stuck on You"	Jonathan Glassner	Timothy J. Lea & Eli Talbert	February 1, 2006	214	16.42
A billionaire playboy throws a party for a mosaic artist only to end up impaled on a wall with a young woman, with an arrow crossing their bodies leaving him injured and the woman dead. Also, Danny and Lindsay investigate when a man who worked sticking posters is found dead on a street, with glue all over his face and a crushed throat.
38	15	"Fare Game"	Kevin Dowling	Zachary Reiter & Peter M. Lenkov	March 1, 2006	215	13.76
An assistant district attorney found shot dead in a graveyard leads the CSIs to a strange game being played by various people all over the city. The team also investigates the unusual death of a woman known for her frivolous lawsuits, which leads them to a bizarre restaurant.
39	16	"Cool Hunter"	Norberto Barba	Daniele Nathanson	March 8, 2006	216	13.91
A doorwoman is found dead in the water tank of her apartment building. All the readily available evidence points to a doctor who lives in the building. However, the man swears that he had nothing to do with the dead woman, and a closer look into the tenants' personal lives provides the answer. The other case is of an urban developer found dead on a playground in Washington Heights, strangled with the chain of a playground swing.
40	17	"Necrophilia Americana"	Steven DePaul	Andrew Lipsitz	March 22, 2006	217	13.93
A witness to a horrible murder of a museum curator, a young boy, confuses the events of the murder with a comic book he was reading at the time. Detectives struggle to find out if the crime was motivated by money, given the victim's wealth, or if the victim and the boy are somehow connected. Meanwhile, Danny looks into the death of an urban golfer found dead on a construction site.
41	18	"Live or Let Die"	Rob Bailey	Story by : Gary Sinise & Michael Daly; Teleplay by : Pam Veasey	March 29, 2006	218	14.81
When a helicopter containing a liver from an organ donor is hijacked from the roof of a Manhattan hospital, and a medical intern is killed in the process, the CSIs must find the perpetrators and the liver before the recipient transplant patient dies. The only witness is an unconscious helicopter pilot, and they soon realize it may have been an inside job. Meanwhile, Stella and Lindsay investigate the rape and murder of a restaurant hostess who engaged in phone sex with her patrons.
42	19	"Super Men"	Steven DePaul	Story by : Peter M. Lenkov; Teleplay by : Peter M. Lenkov & Pam Veasey	April 12, 2006	219	14.14
The illegal sale of prescription drugs are discovered during the investigation of the murder of a mentally disabled but would-be super hero. On a separate case, a college football star is murdered in his hotel room soon after being chosen first in the league draft.
43	20	"Run Silent, Run Deep"	Rob Bailey	Anthony E. Zuiker	April 19, 2006	220	15.14
Mac is informed by an anonymous call that the body of a young man is buried at football stadium. Upon further investigation the CSI team is led to believe that the Tanglewood Boys are once again involved. The leader of the gang, Sonny Sassone, was able to beat the system before. This time Mac is making it his mission to make Sonny pay. Meanwhile, Stella and Danny investigate the murder of a banker in a hotel room. Danny becomes a suspect in Mac's case due to his connection to the buried man. He confronts his brother and the events that follow prove heartbreaking.
44	21	"All Access"	Norberto Barba	Timothy J. Lea & Anthony E. Zuiker	April 26, 2006	221	15.23
A rock star's limo driver is found dead outside a Kid Rock concert. When Stella is found unconscious in her apartment next to her dead boyfriend, Mac and Flack must prove it was self-defense on Stella's part, but first must get her to remember exactly what happened.
45	22	"Stealing Home"	Oz Scott	Zachary Reiter	May 3, 2006	222	14.68
Two grieving widows arrive at the scene of a murder, both claiming to be the wife of the victim. Mac, Stella and Dr. Hawkes try to sort out the details when they discover that the women were knowingly involved in the marriage. A case personally affects Lindsay when she learns that a woman's body, tangled in kelp, strangled to death and dressed like a mermaid, is from her home state.
46	23	"Heroes"	Anthony Hemingway	Eli Talbert	May 10, 2006	223	15.16
Things get personal for Mac when he and Danny are called to a Marine corporal found dead in Central Park during Fleet Week. Although the man was stabbed to death, he has a conspicuous lack of defensive wounds. Stella, Lindsay, and Hawkes investigate a body burned beyond recognition found in a car. They initially believe the body is that of the car's owner, a male, but the autopsy reveals that the body is female. After Hawkes completes a facial reconstruction of the skull, the CSIs are horrified when they learn the victim's true identity, and Mac is determined to put the killer behind bars and keep an old promise.
47	24	"Charge of This Post"	Rob Bailey	Timothy J. Lea	May 17, 2006	224	13.23
Mac, Lindsay, and Flack are called to a crime scene where a security guard is found stabbed to death in a stairwell. Investigating the surrounding area, however, Mac discovers a bomb. After warning the inhabitants, and before he and Flack can escape the building, the bomb goes off, severely injuring Flack and several others. Amid the following chaos and involvement of Homeland Security, as well as being contacted by the bomber who threatens to bomb another location, Mac flashes back to the 1983 Beirut bombing when he was a young Marine officer.
