= CSI: NY season 3 =

Season of television series

CSI: NY
- Season 3
- Season 3 U.S. DVD cover
- No. of episodes: 24

Release
- Original network: CBS
- Original release: September 20, 2006 – May 16, 2007

Season chronology
- ← Previous; Season 2 Next → Season 4

The third season of CSI: NY originally aired on CBS between September 2006 and May 2007. It consisted of 24 episodes. Its regular time slot continued on Wednesdays at 10pm/9c.

Episode 22, "Cold Reveal", crossed over with a visiting character from Cold Case.

CSI: NY – The Complete Third Season was released on DVD in the U.S. on October 9, 2007.

== Cast ==
=== Main cast ===
- Gary Sinise as Mac Taylor
- Melina Kanakaredes as Stella Bonasera
- Carmine Giovinazzo as Danny Messer
- Anna Belknap as Lindsay Monroe
- Hill Harper as Sheldon Hawkes
- Eddie Cahill as Don Flack

=== Recurring cast ===
- Robert Joy as Sid Hammerback
- A. J. Buckley as Adam Ross
- Emmanuelle Vaugier as Jessica Angell
- Claire Forlani as Peyton Driscoll
- Kyle Gallner as Reed Garrett

== Episodes ==
No. overall	No. in season	Title	Directed by	Written by	Original release date	US viewers (millions)
48	1	"People with Money"	Rob Bailey	Pam Veasey & Peter M. Lenkov	September 20, 2006	16.11
Mac and his new romantic interest and colleague, Dr. Peyton Driscoll, receive a new case when a man is found dead by nude bungee-jumpers on the Brooklyn Bridge after what appears to be an unsuccessful marriage proposal. Meanwhile, Hawkes, Danny, and new colleague Detective Jessica Angell investigate the death of a wealthy heiress in her apartment, found beaten to death with pillows over her hands.
49	2	"Not What It Looks Like"	Duane Clark	Pam Veasey & Peter M. Lenkov	September 27, 2006	16.21
The team is called in when three young women rob a jewelry store dressed as Audrey Hepburn's character Holly Golightly from the 1961 film Breakfast at Tiffany's, leaving one man dead from accidental causes. When one of the thieves is found dead and another goes missing, blood diamond criminals are found to be responsible. Mac and Angell also investigate a woman's mummified body found in a building slated for demolition, with much of the evidence, and political/media attention, pointing to her politician husband.
50	3	"Love Run Cold"	Tim Iacofano	Timothy J. Lea	October 4, 2006	15.73
Danny, Flack, and Lindsay encounter a rapidly melting crime scene when a model, apparently stabbed by an icicle, is found dead at an ice-themed promotional party for vodka. Mac, Stella and Hawkes investigate when a businessman running in the 2006 "Big Apple Marathon" is found dead from what appears to be carbon monoxide poisoning. Meanwhile, Danny, having been stood up on a dinner-date by Lindsay, tries to understand her feelings, but Lindsay needs more time "to work some stuff out".
51	4	"Hung Out to Dry"	Anthony Hemingway	Zachary Reiter	October 11, 2006	17.97
A decapitated corpse of a young college student is found hung upside-down in a dorm room during a party. The shirt the victim was wearing is decorated with symbols out of numerology and Greek mythology, and also contains code words that, with the aid of a witness, leads the CSIs to a bizarre website. When another brutal murder occurs with the victim wearing a similar shirt, the team realizes they have a serial killer on their hands.
52	5	"Oedipus Hex"	Scott Lautanen	Anthony E. Zuiker & Ken Solarz	October 18, 2006	15.99
Danny, Lindsay, and Hawkes investigate the murder of one of the alt porn models known as the SuicideGirls found beaten to death in a alley while Mac and Stella look for answers in the death of a street basketball player.
53	6	"Open and Shut"	Joe Ann Fogle	Wendy Battles	October 25, 2006	17.42
While investigating the impalement of a young hotel employee at a swimsuit modeling shoot, the CSI team hears shots across the street and run to another crime scene where a shocked woman has just shot an intruder who apparently murdered her husband .
54	7	"Murder Sings the Blues"	Oz Scott	Sam Humphrey	November 1, 2006	16.64
A young woman dies after she starts bleeding from her eyes, nose, and mouth while at a party aboard a subway train, leading the team to speculate that she is the victim of a biological attack. Hawkes soon realizes that he knows the victim. Across town, a wealthy playboy is found drowned in his indoor lap pool in his penthouse suite. The evidence seems to point to his last maid (Meghan Markle), who was fired two days earlier.
55	8	"Consequences"	Rob Bailey	Pam Veasey	November 8, 2006	16.78
The CSIs are called in when a young paintball champion is found shot dead in a warehouse. They soon find out that his fiercest rival, with whom he was faced in a deathmatch, has gone missing. The case grows complicated when traces of cocaine are found in the warehouse that lead the team to an old drug bust that one of their own was in charge of. Meanwhile, Stella is concerned that she is being followed by someone.
56	9	"And Here's to You, Mrs. Azrael"	David Von Ancken	Peter M. Lenkov	November 15, 2006	16.18
A young girl is found smothered to death in her hospital room, five days after getting into a car accident which left her paralyzed and her passenger dead. Hawkes, who used to work at the hospital, has a bitter confrontation with his old boss, the hospital's chief of staff, reminding him why he quit being a doctor to become a coroner.
57	10	"Sweet Sixteen"	David Jackson	Ken Solarz	November 22, 2006	15.31
A parachute jumper meets his death when his parachute is struck by a flock of pigeons, all of which strangely end up dead beside his body. Mac, Danny, and Flack then discover the pigeons were used for racing, but when they track down the birds' owner, they find him brutally murdered inside the rooftop pigeon coop. Stella, Lindsay, and Hawkes investigate when the father of a girl celebrating her Sweet Sixteen is found dead inside the Mercedes he bought for her.
58	11	"Raising Shane"	Christine Moore	Zachary Reiter & Pam Veasey	November 29, 2006	16.43
The CSIs are called in when a bartender is robbed and shot. When the police capture a suspect matching a witness' description, the team is stunned when the suspect is Sheldon Hawkes. Despite being pulled off the case and being reassigned to one involving a junkie found dead in an adult bookstore, the team tries clandestinely to exonerate Hawkes and find the real culprit. It is soon discovered that the case that they were reassigned to is not only connected to the serial killer who escaped, Shane Casey, but also to Hawkes' case.
59	12	"Silent Night"	Rob Bailey	Sam Humphrey, Peter M. Lenkov & Anthony E. Zuiker	December 13, 2006	15.83
Mac and Hawkes have a problem when they find out that the family of a murder victim are all deaf, so they have to find a new way to catch the killer. Danny and Stella investigate the death of a competitive ice skater and wonder if she had been stalked. More information is given on Lindsay's horrifying past and what led her to become a CSI.
60	13	"Obsession"	Jeffrey Hunt	Jeremy Littman	January 17, 2007	13.77
A well-heeled man is found stabbed to death in a vacant apartment, but the evidence suggests that the victim may have been killed by someone he kidnapped. In Central Park, a man's battered body is discovered stuffed in a shopping cart. The probe reveals the dead man was part of a bizarre race that uses shopping carts and that his team was sabotaged by other participants.
61	14	"The Lying Game"	Anthony Hemingway	Wendy Battles	January 24, 2007	13.35
A female impersonator who performed at a party in a ritzy hotel is found dead in a men's room stall, drowned in the toilet. The investigation reveals the victim confronted a Congressman at another hotel event shortly before being murdered. Across town, a man's body is found inside of a city salt truck. Lindsay returns to Montana to testify as the only witness in a multiple-homicide trial.
62	15	"Some Buried Bones"	Rob Bailey	Noah Nelson	February 7, 2007	14.97
Mac and Hawkes investigate the death of a college student found stabbed and beaten to death in a maze and learn of his involvement with a secret society. Danny and Stella look into the shooting of a security guard at a lavish store and eye a professional shoplifter as their prime suspect. Featuring guest star and music from Nelly Furtado.
63	16	"Heart of Glass"	David Jackson	Bill Haynes & Pam Veasey	February 14, 2007	14.81
When a music industry mogul is killed by being pushed into a fish tank in his high-end penthouse apartment, Mac, Stella, and the team must rely on the crime's only witness, the victim's sister, to solve their case. Stella is injured while processing evidence, which has greater implications than she had bargained for. Danny works to figure out how a woman ended up dead in the bathtub of a man the victim was stalking.
64	17	"The Ride-In"	Steven DePaul	Peter M. Lenkov	February 21, 2007	13.68
A man is found shot dead in a rundown Rockaway Beach house under a pile of money. Outside in his backyard is an ark that contains animals and eight people. The investigation reveals the man spread the belief that the world was ending and charged people to go on his ark where they would be saved. Back in the city, a man dressed as a giant cigarette, apparently protesting against a tobacco company, is found dead on the street after being set on fire. Stella reveals to Mac that she was possibly exposed to HIV at a previous crime scene.
65	18	"Sleight Out of Hand"	Rob Bailey	John Dove & Zachary Reiter	February 28, 2007	14.33
A woman is found sawed in half inside a magician's wooden box onstage in an abandoned Times Square theater. The investigation reveals the victim worked for a famous illusionist (Criss Angel) who was performing outside when the murder occurred. In Montana, Lindsay is on the stand and struggles to recall a multiple homicide from 10 years before, in which three of her friends were gunned down inside a cafe.
66	19	"A Daze of Wine and Roaches"	Oz Scott	Timothy J. Lea & Daniele Nathanson	March 21, 2007	13.64
Mac, Stella and Hawkes must hurdle diplomatic roadblocks to investigate a death involving UN personnel that occurs during a French Revolution-themed fund-raiser. Danny and Lindsay find a jewel-encrusted Madagascar hissing cockroach on the body of a restaurateur found stabbed with a corkscrew in his newly opened restaurant's wine vault.
67	20	"What Schemes May Come"	Christine Moore	Bruce Zimmerman	April 11, 2007	12.64
When a body is stolen from the coroner's van the team stumbles onto a lab performing genetic testing on human hibernation. The team's two other cases involve a man impaled in a medieval suit and a man found stabbed with an ice pick in his expensive hotel room. Stella asks Mac to approve the purchase of a kit that will allow the lab to run a test to determine quicker if she's HIV positive.
68	21	"Past Imperfect"	Oz Scott	Wendy Battles	April 25, 2007	11.40
A serial killer whose conviction was overturned due to Mac jailing his arresting officer begins killing again, causing Mac to go after him with a vengeance. The team works on a case of a man poisoned with Ricin who is linked to the Russian mafia. Meanwhile, Stella gets the good news that she is HIV negative.
69	22	"Cold Reveal"	Marshall Adams	Pam Veasey & Sam Humphrey	May 2, 2007	13.00
Stella becomes a murder suspect in a Philadelphia cold case when Det. Scotty Valens visits the lab and tells her that her DNA matches the evidence. Meanwhile, Mac's career is jeopardized when an internal investigation is opened against him. This episode crosses over with fellow Jerry Bruckheimer-produced series Cold Case. Also, when a man dressed up as an angel seems to have fallen from the heavens into a church, the CSIs must find out what really happened.
70	23	"...Comes Around"	Rob Bailey	Daniele Nathanson & Pam Veasey	May 9, 2007	12.83
Tennis legend John McEnroe is suspected of the murder of an about-to-be-married man at his fiancée's bachelorette party. The victim was impaled on the coin slot of a condom machine. Despite a solid alibi, evidence and witnesses all point to McEnroe as the culprit. Mac's investigation leads to a political firestorm that threatens to end his career.
71	24	"Snow Day"	Duane Clark	Pam Veasey & Peter M. Lenkov	May 16, 2007	13.07
Following the largest drug seizure in New York history, Mac and the CSIs must save the lab and face one of their toughest challenges yet when, in an elaborate heist, a drug lord and his crew descend upon the lab's vault in hopes of retrieving their merchandise.
