= Triborough =

Triborough or Triboro may refer to:

- Triborough Bridge and Tunnel Authority, a unit of the New York state Metropolitan Transportation Authority
- Triborough Bridge, a complex of three bridges connecting the New York City boroughs of Manhattan, Bronx, and Queens
- "Tri-Borough" (CSI: NY), an episode of CSI: NY
