= Open and Shut =

Open and Shut may refer to:

- "Open and Shut" (Cardiac Arrest), a 1996 television episode
- "Open and Shut" (CSI: NY), a 2006 television episode
- "Open and Shut" (House), a 2010 television episode
