= Matias Masucci =

American writer, independent filmmaker and actor

- Born: Novara, Italy
- Occupations: Writer; filmmaker; actor
- Years active: 2002–present
- Website: www.indso.com

Matias Masucci is an Italian-born American writer, independent filmmaker and actor. Masucci has been a proponent of digital independent cinema and self distribution since the early 2000s. His work includes the short film happiending (2008) the independent feature film Noise Matters (2013) and both fiction and non-fiction writings.

== Life and career ==
Masucci was born in the city of Novara, in northern Italy, where he began his acting career in theater while in school. At age eighteen he relocated to Hollywood and later appeared in the television series CSI: NY (2004) and The Bold and the Beautiful (2005). His transition behind the camera began first as a screenwriter with the short film A Short One (2006) and later as a director with the mockumentary short Rotting Dancers (2007). Masucci has written, produced and directed several short films including the award-winning happiending (2008). His feature length directorial debut came with the film Noise Matters (2013) which premiered in London at the 20th edition of the Raindance Film Festival in 2012. He has cited among his cinematic influences the works of Luis Buñuel, Robert Bresson and Federico Fellini.

His literary works include short stories, screenplays, essays and articles, and have been featured in various digital and print publications. Masucci produces and distributes most of his work through his brand Independent Society.

== Filmography ==
Year	Film	Actor	Director	Writer	Producer	Editor	Notes
2003	Five O Four	✓		✓	✓		short
2006	A Short One	✓		✓	✓		short
2007	The Gig	✓		✓			short
2007	Rotting Dancers	✓	✓	✓	✓	✓	short
2008	happiending	✓	✓	✓	✓	✓	short
2011	Noise Matters	✓	✓	✓	✓	✓	feature length
