= CSI: NY season 1 =

Season of television series

CSI: NY
- Season 1
- Season 1 U.S. DVD cover
- No. of episodes: 23

Release
- Original network: CBS
- Original release: September 22, 2004 – May 18, 2005

Season chronology
- Next → Season 2

The first season of CSI: NY originally aired on CBS between September 2004 and May 2005. It consisted of 23 episodes. Its regular time slot was Wednesdays at 10pm/9c.

CSI: NY – The Complete First Season was released on DVD in the U.S. on October 18, 2005.

== Cast ==
=== Main cast ===
- Gary Sinise as Mac Taylor
- Melina Kanakaredes as Stella Bonasera
- Carmine Giovinazzo as Danny Messer
- Vanessa Ferlito as Aiden Burn
- Hill Harper as Sheldon Hawkes
- Eddie Cahill as Don Flack

=== Recurring cast ===
- J. Grant Albrecht as Dr. Leonard Giles
- Sonya Walger as Jane Parsons
- Kelly Hu as Kaile Maka
- Chad Lindberg as Chad Willingham

== Episodes ==
| No. overall | No. in season | Title | Directed by | Written by | Original release date | Prod. code | US viewers (millions) |
|---|---|---|---|---|---|---|---|
| 1 | 1 | "Blink" | Deran Sarafian | Anthony E. Zuiker | September 22, 2004 | 101 | 19.26 |
The CSIs find three young women, all of whom appear to have been brutalized in the same way. Photographs found at one of the crime scenes lead the team to a couple who had sponsored one of the victims, and the boyfriend of another victim who claims he hasn't spoken to her in weeks. Unfortunately the only witness they have is one of the young women, who has Locked-in syndrome.
| 2 | 2 | "Creatures of the Night" | Tim Hunter | Pam Veasey | September 29, 2004 | 103 | 19.47 |
A wealthy young woman is found to have been raped and beaten in Central Park, but only a peony leaf on her clothing can direct Stella and Danny to the scene of the rape. Worse, no DNA is found from the rape kit and the victim has no memory of what happened, making the task of finding the perpetrator a real challenge. Meanwhile, a junkie is found shot to death in an alleyway, but the bullet that killed him is missing. Mac, Aiden, and Hawkes soon realize that a rat may have eaten the bullet, and finding the rat leads them to a robbery that occurred earlier that day.
| 3 | 3 | "American Dreamers" | Rob Bailey | Eli Talbert | October 6, 2004 | 104 | 16.89 |
After a skeleton is found on a tour bus and turns out to be over a decade old, Mac and the team use the backpack they have found to track the belongs to a young man named Aaron Moreland, only to learn that the body they have cannot possibly be him. By tracing the victim's shirt, detectives are led to a youth center worker who claims not to remember the boy, but is hiding an old secret of his own.
| 4 | 4 | "Grand Master" | Kevin Bray | Zachary Reiter | October 27, 2004 | 105 | 12.98 |
On the very night that he wins a disc jockey competition, DJ Banner is found dead in an alleyway outside the club where the contest is being run, prompting Mac and Aiden to investigate not only the club but also Banner's primary competition, who was jealous that his girlfriend's voice was part of Banner's act. Stella and Danny investigate the death of a fashion designer, found face-down in the swimming pool at her apartment by her assistant, who isn't concerned about her boss's demise. An autopsy reveals that the cause of death was poisoning by tetrodotoxin, a poison found in blowfish, which leads Stella and Danny to a high-class sushi restaurant.
| 5 | 5 | "A Man a Mile" | David Grossman | Andrew Lipsitz | November 3, 2004 | 102 | 14.71 |
Stella and Aiden investigate when the body of a teenage girl is retrieved from the harbor. They soon realize that she was a middle-class girl attending a fancy school who was trying to make it seem like her family had more money than they did. Mac and Danny investigate when a body is found in a construction tunnel for a new part of the city's water supply. However, they end up running into difficulty when the Sandhogs, a union for the tunnel's diggers, block many of their attempts to get information about the victim.
| 6 | 6 | "Outside Man" | Rob Bailey | Timothy J. Lea | November 10, 2004 | 107 | 15.38 |
Terrell Davenport and Octavia Figueroa are the only survivors of a brutal slaying and robbery at a diner that leaves Danny and Aiden scratching their heads when they can't find a suspect until they take a closer look into the life of one of the survivors. Mac and Stella investigate the death of a man who recently had his leg amputated, only to learn that there was no medical reason whatsoever why the limb had to be removed.
| 7 | 7 | "Rain" | David Grossman | Pam Veasey | November 17, 2004 | 108 | 17.46 |
When the charred bodies of two men who had been robbing a Chinatown bank are found, the entire team investigates the crime, which leads them to Doris, the missing infant of the bank's manager. The team realizes that Joanna Cho assisted with the robbery out of fear for her daughter's life. Mac and Stella finally manage to track down the third robber, only to find him lying in a pool of blood, with a trail of bloody baby handprints leading away from the body.
| 8 | 8 | "Three Generations are Enough" | Alex Zakrzewski | Andrew Lipsitz | November 24, 2004 | 109 | 13.50 |
Danny, Aiden and Mac investigate after a briefcase belonging to Luke Sutton is found left in the New York Mercantile Exchange with a bloody note inside. Their investigation into Sutton's activities lead them to Nick Lawson, whom Sutton had been investigating for illegal trades, but who swears he had nothing to do with his disappearance. Stella and Flack investigate the death of Trina Rolston, a young pregnant woman who fell to her death from the roof of a church. With Hawkes help, Stella realizes that the body was thrown off the roof to mask the true cause of death. The detectives soon realize that their two cases are connected.
| 9 | 9 | "Officer Blue" | Deran Sarafian | Anthony E. Zuiker | December 1, 2004 | 110 | 14.92 |
After mounted patrolman Valasquez is shot down in the park, Mac goes looking for the bullet that killed the officer only to learn that it is lodged in his horse's spine and cannot be removed without being fatal to the horse (Officer Blue). The investigation leads the team to a local street vendor, but stalls when the D.A. asks Mac not to do anything to risk the horse until after the woman who donated it has a chance to say goodbye. Aiden investigates the body of a young man, Lenny Starks, who was found face-down, dead in the street. Aiden traces the young man to a local pizza parlor where she faces intimidation from the bookies who use it as a gambling front.
| 10 | 10 | "Night, Mother" | Deran Sarafian | Janet Tamaro | December 15, 2004 | 106 | 15.60 |
A game of one-on-one basketball is interrupted by the discovery of a woman covered in blood leaning over the body of another woman who has had a stake driven through her heart. Mac soon realizes the woman was sleepwalking and tried to save the victim's life, but the case stalls because she is the closest thing they have to a witness, and she has no memory of the event. Danny and Aiden investigate the brutal murder of a pickpocket whose identity they track down using information on an experimental medical trial. Money found in the victim's underwear leads the two to another pickpocket, but there is no obvious motive for Lenny Cook's death.
| 11 | 11 | "Tri-Borough" | Greg Yaitanes | Eli Talbert & Andrew Lipsitz | January 5, 2005 | 111 | 12.15 |
Mac and Stella investigate the electrocution death of a man found in a subway tunnel. Danny investigates the murder of a gallery owner whose death is connected to the mob. Aiden and Flack investigate the death of a construction worker.
| 12 | 12 | "Recycling" | Alex Zakrzewski | Timothy J. Lea & Zachary Reiter | January 12, 2005 | 112 | 13.66 |
Mac, Aiden and Flack investigate when Elaine Curtis is found dead at a dog competition, a knitting needle sticking out of her chest, and no shortage of suspects ranging from judges to trainers to contestants. Stella and Danny investigate the death of bicycle messenger Michael Starling, but the crime scene may have been anywhere along his route.
| 13 | 13 | "Tanglewood" | Karen Gaviola | Anthony E. Zuiker | January 26, 2005 | 113 | 17.56 |
Mac and Stella investigate the death of Paul Montenassi, a young man left to bleed to death in the snow. The investigation leads them to another victim, Mihok Lev, who had been killed by Montenassi in a robbery earlier that evening. When Hawkes concludes his autopsy on Montenassi, he is able to reveal a sanded-off tattoo that leads the detectives to the Tanglewood Boys. Danny and Aiden investigate the hit-and-run that caused the death of Marta Santo. After discovering sperm on the woman's clothing, Danny and Aiden learn that Santo liked things rough, and their investigation leads them to an erotic massage parlor.
| 14 | 14 | "Blood, Sweat and Tears" | Scott Lautanen | Eli Talbert & Erica Shelton | February 9, 2005 | 114 | 13.08 |
The body of a young contortionist is found folded into a box on Coney Island, leading Mac and Stella to the circus where they find themselves embroiled in a real-life Romeo and Juliet story between the dead contortionist, Lukas, and a trapeze artist, Anasuya. Danny and Flack find a woman's body in a garbage chute and learn that she was actually the former sorority sister of the woman who lived in that building, and turn their suspicion to the abusive husband the woman was hiding from.
| 15 | 15 | "'Til Death Do We Part" | Nelson McCormick | Pam Veasey | February 16, 2005 | 115 | 14.04 |
The team's investigation into the death of Hannah Bloom, who died at her own wedding, is put on hold when her father refuses to allow them to perform an autopsy until after his daughter's body is blessed by a rabbi. Danny and Mac turn their attention to the woman who trained the doves who were supposed to be released, but cannot tie her directly to Bloom, who died from formaldehyde poisoning. Stella, Flack and Aiden investigate when a hand is found deep underground and soon realize that the dead man, Rick Amadori, chewed off his own hand. It seems like a slam dunk when the son of a man Amadori killed three years earlier confesses to the crime, but things aren't as easy as they seem.
| 16 | 16 | "Hush" | Deran Sarafian | Anthony E. Zuiker & Timothy J. Lea | February 23, 2005 | 116 | 14.31 |
Mac and Stella investigate when they find the body of Paddy Dolan, a longshoreman. Part of the body is found on a transport truck and another part back at the warehouses, but Mac encounters difficulty with the investigation when the workers put up a wall of silence. Aiden and Danny investigate the death of Debbie Bogda, who was found naked on the expressway, and their investigation leads them into a world of sexual games and bondage once they realize she was actually harnessed to the front of a truck.
| 17 | 17 | "The Fall" | Norberto Barba | Story by : Bill Haynes; Teleplay by : Anne McGrail | March 2, 2005 | 117 | 13.62 |
When young gang members murder the owner of an upscale Bronx wine store, the CSIs must work to find evidence that ultimately ties someone to the crime. Before dying, the storeowner makes a statement to police identifying his attackers as young gang members. Tempers flare when the murder investigation reunites Flack with his long-time mentor and friend Sergeant Gavin Moran, who was the first to arrive at the crime scene. Meanwhile, Danny and Aiden investigate the death of an influential movie producer found dead on the canopy of his Chelsea apartment building.
| 18 | 18 | "The Dove Commission" | Emilio Estevez | Anthony E. Zuiker & Zachary Reiter | March 23, 2005 | 118 | 16.73 |
When the chief investigator of a controversial report documenting corruption within the NYPD is gunned down the day before his findings are published, Mac and Stella must find the killer, launching a massive search that makes every officer listed in the report a suspect. Meanwhile, Danny and Aiden investigate the murder of a Gypsy cab driver.
| 19 | 19 | "Crime and Misdemeanor" | Rob Bailey | Eli Talbert & Andrew Lipsitz | April 13, 2005 | 119 | 11.00 |
When the body of a young woman is discovered inside a laundry facility dryer, the bed sheets she is wrapped in lead Mac and Stella back to an upscale New York hotel that houses diplomats from around the world when the United Nations is in special session. Meanwhile, Danny and Aiden investigate the death of a homeless man found dressed as a human statue. By all accounts, the prank is deemed a misdemeanour, but Danny decides to delve further and his refusal to stop the investigation puts him at odds with Mac.
| 20 | 20 | "Supply and Demand" | Joe Chappelle | Erica Shelton & Anne McGrail | April 27, 2005 | 120 | 14.84 |
When a college student is beaten, shot to death and his apartment ransacked in what appears to be a drug-related hit, the team must track down his killers. After examining the evidence in the murdered student's apartment, the team finds traces of pure, unprocessed heroin and discovers that the victim had a female roommate who is now missing. Meanwhile, Stella's aggressive interrogation tactics with a witness threaten her police badge.
| 21 | 21 | "On the Job" | David Von Ancken | Timothy J. Lea | May 4, 2005 | 121 | 13.42 |
While processing a crime scene, Danny is suddenly attacked by a suspect hiding in the victim's closet. The ensuing chase leads them to a crowded New York subway where the suspect, Danny, and an undercover cop all fire shots. When the smoke clears, the team is left with a dead cop, a missing suspect and Danny under investigation for the possible murder of the officer. Mac and Aiden must prove who killed the cop in order to save Danny's job. Meanwhile, Stella investigates the death of a nanny killed in a Central Park restroom.
| 22 | 22 | "The Closer" | Emilio Estevez | Pam Veasey | May 11, 2005 | 122 | 14.55 |
The team examines the murder of an avid Boston Red Sox fan found dead with a ruptured spleen following a tough loss against the New York Yankees. Danny must put his baseball skills to the test to piece together the evidence as the CSIs try to find out how and why he was murdered. Meanwhile, after testifying in a murder trial, Mac is confronted by the defendant, Quinn Sullivan, who questions the validity of the evidence. Mac is torn between trusting science or his desire to help a man facing jail time who swears he's innocent. Also, when a truck kills a barely clad woman early one morning, the team investigates why she was running through the streets and from whom.
| 23 | 23 | "What You See Is What You See" | Duane Clark | Andrew Lipsitz | May 18, 2005 | 123 | 12.30 |
While Mac dines at his local breakfast spot, a gunman opens fire, leaving one man dead and a waitress critically injured, and Mac having to choose whether to chase after the suspect or save the life of the young woman. Meanwhile, before the chaos, Mac was approached by a shy woman who awkwardly engaged him in conversation. After he saves her life during the shoot out, she asks him to join her for a drink and Mac must decide if he is ready to start dating again after his wife's tragic death. Meanwhile Hawkes make a surprising decision to his colleagues.

== Special DVD Features ==
These features came special on the Complete Season DVD sets. Season 1 consisted of 7 discs.

- Each episode on each of the DVDs for Season 1 also come with a commentary track from the producers of the show.
- DVD 1 has a special episode, "MIA/NYC NonStop". This is the backdoor pilot episode of CSI: NY where Mac Taylor and other New York characters are introduced and who work with Horatio Caine to help solve a crime which started in Miami.
- The listing in CSI: NY Seasons 1-3 box set are listed by their Production Number, not the Number In Season.

Special Features (Disc 7)

- The Cast Examines the Characters
- The Science Behind the Scenes
- CSI: NY - Self Tour
- The World's Largest Crime Scene
- The Zoo Year
