= Donald Flack Jr. =

Don Flack
- CSI: NY character
- First appearance: "Blink"
- Last appearance: "Today Is Life"
- Portrayed by: Eddie Cahill
- City: New York City

In-universe information
- Occupation: Police Detective
- Position: Homicide Investigator
- Rank: NYPD Detective First Grade
- Duration: 2004–2013
- Seasons: 1, 2, 3, 4, 5, 6, 7, 8, 9

Donald Flack Jr. is a fictional character on the CBS television series, CSI: NY. He is portrayed by Eddie Cahill.

== Characterization ==
Detective Don Flack (badge #8571) is portrayed as the legal muscle for the CSI: NY team, similar to the roles of his Las Vegas and Miami counterparts Jim Brass and Frank Tripp. He can often be seen interrogating suspects with a characteristic wit and sarcasm. Though not as highly educated as the CSIs – in episode 2.11, "Trapped", Flack quips "and for those of us with just a high school diploma" when Stella is talking about the chemical composition of soap and bleach – Flack is intellectual and trusts the CSIs' judgment and respects their findings. What he lacks in "book knowledge" he makes up with his street smarts and policing instincts, which often prove equally helpful to the investigation. He is loyal to his colleagues and the uniformed officers under him. Throughout the series, he defends his CSI counterparts to skeptical colleagues, especially in episode 3.11, "Raising Shane", and was estranged from Mac for a while when one of his colleagues came under suspicion for a crime.

== Storylines ==
Flack is a homicide detective with the NYPD, known for both his dry wit and his determination to hunt down suspects, even to the point of chasing them down alleys and over rooftops. He was mentored by another cop, Gavin Moran, whom he is later forced to arrest after it comes to light that Moran concealed evidence during the course of an investigation (episode 1.17, "The Fall"). He is at least a second-generation cop; Moran mentions having worked with Flack's father as well. He is both a colleague and a friend to the members of the New York City Crime Lab. After Stella Bonasera is attacked in her apartment by her unstable boyfriend, Flack gently helps her through the aftermath when he comes to the hospital to take her statement (episode 2.21, "All Access").

His friendship with Mac Taylor is tested when Taylor uncovers evidence that one of Flack's men, Dean Truby, is a dirty cop and asks Don to turn over his memo notebook to prove it. Though Flack eventually capitulates, their relationship is a bit tense for some time afterward (episode 3.08, "Consequences"; episode 3.10, "Sweet 16"). Flack defends Taylor to Captain Gerrard, who is investigating Sheldon Hawkes, the prime suspect in a robbery-homicide, after Taylor locks himself in the interrogation room with Sheldon. Flack affirms that Gerrard would do the same for him [Flack] (episode 3.11, "Raising Shane").

He is also close to Danny Messer, attempting to offer him some sound advice in episode 1.21, "On the Job", when it appears that Danny accidentally kills an undercover officer. It is also revealed that Danny and Flack spend some of their downtime together as friends. In the series' first episode, "Blink", Danny is exiting an interrogation room and casually says to Don, "Hoops on Saturday, Flack. Don't forget." They are seen together at a basketball game in episode 4.19, "Personal Foul". They also meet up for drinks and pool in episode 3.23, "...Comes Around", and have a heart-to-heart talk about their jobs and why they do what they do. In episode 7.08, "Scared Stiff", Danny teases Flack after he tells him that he is afraid of spiders.

Flack is devastated when his girlfriend, Detective Jessica Angell, is shot and killed in the season five finale (episode 5.25, "Pay Up"). His grief over her murder causes him to shoot her killer when he finds the man alone. The shooting is never questioned, but his grooming and appearance suffer. In season six he shows up to work in sweatshirts and jeans, as opposed to his usual suits, dress shirts, and ties; and Stella notices that he has stopped shaving. When Cliff, Angell's father, runs into him at the station one day, he comments that he hadn't seen Flack since Angell's funeral. Cliff invites Flack over to his home for dinner on what would have been Jessica's birthday. Flack accepts the invitation, but is unable to let himself join the festivities; after sitting in his car outside the Angell home for a while, he drives away without anyone in the house knowing that he had been there (episode 6.03, "Lat 40° 47' N/Long 73° 58' W"). Flack spirals down yet further, drinking and missing work. It takes an unexpected rescue by one of his old informants while Flack is intoxicated to begin to bring him to his senses (episode 6.08, "Cuckoo's Nest"). Later episodes show him back in command of himself, as sharp as ever, much to the relief of his friends and colleagues.

== On the job ==
In episode 2.24, "Charge of this Post", Flack is critically injured when a bomb goes off in a building he and Mac are evacuating. Until their rescue, Taylor is able to keep Flack alive using a shoelace and prior experience in the Beirut barracks bombings. Flack remains unconscious for the remainder of the episode, his concerned colleagues, especially Mac, standing vigil at his bedside. When Flack returns to work, his friends tease him about using his "battle wounds" to impress the ladies (episode 3.01, "People With Money").

Later, Flack is instrumental in the safe resolution of a crisis when he and another officer successfully rescue the infant daughter of an angry and upset young deaf man holding hostage the baby and his dead girlfriend's mother. While Mac Taylor distracts the man on one side of the car, Flack and the other officer sneak up on the other side and take the child out through the window, whereupon Taylor is able to safely disarm the man. Flack then returns the baby to the care of her relieved maternal grandparents (episode 3.12, "Silent Night").

When the aforementioned arrest of Flack's colleague, Truby, results in the release of a serial killer, Flack berates Mac, who angrily counters that they both want the man back behind bars. They put aside their indignation to collar the murderer once more. Flack is mere feet away when the man plummets from a roof, handcuffed, and lands on a police cruiser, fatally wounded. Looking up, he sees Mac staring down at him from where the suspect fell (episode 3.21, "Past Imperfect").

In episode 5.13, "Rush to Judgment", Flack comes under heavy investigation when a suspect dies in his custody during an interrogation. His badge and gun are taken and he is demoted to desk duty and becomes what he calls "a member of the rubber gun squad" until the end of the episode, when his name is cleared. During the investigation, the team is shown to support him, with Stella Bonasera saying that "[Flack] does everything by the book", and showing up to offer words of comfort to Flack while he's working. Also, Mac supports Flack throughout the episode, and at the end offers to take Flack out for a beer and to watch a hockey game, even though Mac doesn't like hockey himself.

== Personal life ==
Flack was born and raised in Queens (episode 9.03 "2,918 Miles"). As a child he would sometimes play in a hedge maze at the Queens Botanical Garden, where he later investigates the death of a Chelsea University student, though he says that by that time he hadn't been there in years (episode 3.15, "Some Buried Bones"). His family, besides his "legendary" father, includes a sister named Samantha Flack and at least one brother. His mother used to make corned beef every Wednesday, and Flack claims that he would "endure every one of [his] brother's insults for one more taste of that paradise" (episode 4.04, "Time's Up"). As children, he and Samantha were the best of friends. They would often share an old Walkman on car trips, much to their father's disapproval, and listen to their favorite song, "Red Rain" by Peter Gabriel (episode 5.07, "Dead Inside").

During season five, it is gradually revealed that he and Samantha have gone on different paths. In episode 5.01, "Veritas", and later in episode 5.07, "Dead Inside", their differences become even more obvious. They care deeply for each other even though he makes it known to her that he disapproves of her "clubbing and drinking" lifestyle. In season 8, it is revealed that she has turned her life around but is unable to find a job due to her prior arrest record. Flack calls in a favor and gets her a job in media relations at the NYPD (episode 8.05, "Air Apparent").

In episode 2.03, "Zoo York", it is revealed he is allergic to cats, which is again mentioned in episode 5.03, "Turbulence". In episode 5.19, "Communication Breakdown", it is revealed that he understands and speaks some degree of Irish learned from his grandfather.

He also says that he "was a Monopoly guy" in response to a comment Stella Bonasera made regarding the board game Clue in episode 2.11, "Trapped". Flack appears to have an appreciation for fine wine, instantly realizing the value of the bottles in a murdered chef's private cellar in episode 3.19, "A Daze of Wine and Roaches". Flack hates being called "bro" (episode 3.04, "Hung Out To Dry") or "dawg" (episode 1.04, "Grand Master").

Mutual interest between Flack and Detective Jessica Angell is hinted at in several episodes, beginning with episode 4.07, "Commuted Sentences". This is finally confirmed when they kiss briefly at the end of episode 5.07, "Dead Inside". In episode 5.13, "Rush to Judgement", the professionalism of their relationship is questioned while Flack is under investigation by Internal Affairs. Their relationship continues to deepen into a mature, stable partnership (episode 5.20 "Prey") until she is killed in episode 5.25, "Pay Up".

In episode 9.05, "Misconceptions", it is revealed that Flack's father died a while back, and he and Samantha take the funeral urn with their father's ashes to Yankee Stadium, presumably to scatter them on the field.

In episode 9.02, "Where There's Smoke...", Flack meets newcomer Detective Jamie Lovato. They begin to work together and by the end of the season they are a couple.
