= Christine Moore (director) =

American television director

- Occupation: Television director.
- Years active: 2004–present

Christine Moore is an American television director. She has directed episodes of The Wire, Treme, CSI: NY, and other television series.

== Filmography ==
=== Television ===
Director

Year	Show	Season	Episode title	Episode
2026	R.J. Decker	2	"Manos: Hands of Fate"	2
2026	R.J. Decker	1	"Even Walls Fall Down"	9
2026	R.J. Decker	1	Burn Notice"	5
2025	Watson	1	"Wait for the Punchline"	3
2023	Alert: Missing Persons Unit	1	"Craig"	8
2023	Alert: Missing Persons Unit	1	"Christine"	7
2023	La Brea	2	"Stampede"	8
2022–2024	NCIS: Hawaiʻi	2-3		5
2021	CSI: Vegas	1	"Waiting in the Wings"	9
2021	CSI: Vegas	1	"In the Blood"	7
2021-2023	The Blacklist	8-10		7
2021-2025	The Equalizer	1-5		4
2021	MacGyver	5	"Rails + Pitons + Pulley + Pipe + Salt"	9
2020	SEAL Team	3	"Edge of Nowhere"	1
2020	Tommy	1		2
2014–2019	NCIS: Los Angeles	5-11		3
2013–2019	Elementary	1–7		20
2012–2013	Army Wives	6		2
2012	Vegas	1		2
2011	Body of Proof	1	"Talking Heads"	4
2011	Law & Order: LA	1	Westwood	22
2010	Treme	1	"Shame, Shame, Shame"	5
2010	CSI: NY	7	"Damned if you Do"	3
2009	Three Rivers	1	"Code Green"	4
2009	Three Rivers	1	"Place of Life"	1
2009	The Beast	1	"Nadia"	3
2008	CSI: NY	5	"Dead Inside"	7
2008	The Cleaner	1	"Meet the Joneses"	3
2008	CSI: NY	4	"Taxi"	20
2008	CSI: NY	4	"DOA For a Day"	15
2008	CSI: NY	4	"Playing with Matches"	14
2007	CSI: Miami	6	"Sunblock"	6
2007	CSI: NY	4	"Down the Rabbit Hole"	5
2007	CSI: NY	3	"What Schemes May Come"	20
2007	Jericho	1	"One Man's Terrorist"	17
2006	CSI: NY	3	"Raising Shane"	11
2006	The Wire	4	"Soft Eyes"	2
2006	Law & Order: Criminal Intent	6	"Masquerade"	6
2004	The Wire	3	"Reformation"	10
