= Kim Clements =

American television writer and producer

Kim Clements is an American television writer and producer. She has worked in both capacities on the series Wanted, The Black Donnellys, Shark, and My Own Worst Enemy. Clements won the Writers Guild of America (WGA) Award for Best Dramatic Series for her work on Lost.

== Career ==
Clements wrote the film Blind with Deborah Day in 1999. She also served as an executive producer on the project.

Clements worked as a staff writer for the second season of The Shield in 2003. She wrote the episodes "Greenlit" and wrote the teleplay and co-wrote the story (with James Manos Jr.) for the episode "Inferno". She became a story editor for the third season in Spring 2004. She co-wrote the episodes "Blood and Water" and "Posse Up" with consulting producer Charles H. Eglee and wrote the episode "What Power Is..." She left the series after the third season.

In fall 2004 Clements joined the crew of Lost as executive story editor for the first season. Clements and the writing staff won the Writers Guild of America (WGA) Award for Best Dramatic Series at the February 2006 ceremony for their work on the first season. She left the series after the first season.

She became a co-producer and writer for the first season of Wanted in 2005. She wrote the episode "Lips Are Lips". The series was canceled after one season.

She was a co-producer and writer for the short-lived crime drama The Black Donnellys in Spring 2007. She co-wrote the episode "A Stone of the Heart" (with creator and executive producer Paul Haggis), wrote the teleplay for the episode "The World Will Break Your Heart" from a story by Bob Lowry and wrote the teleplay and co-wrote the story (with Haggis) for the episode "Easy Is the Way".

She became a producer and writer for the second season of courtroom drama Shark in Fall 2007. She wrote the episode "In Absentia". The series was canceled after the second season. She became a supervising producer for the short lived drama My Own Worst Enemy in 2008.
