= CSI: NY =

2004 American police procedural drama television series

- Genre: Police procedural; Crime drama
- Created by: Anthony E. Zuiker; Ann Donahue; Carol Mendelsohn
- Starring: Gary Sinise; Melina Kanakaredes; Carmine Giovinazzo; Vanessa Ferlito; Hill Harper; Eddie Cahill; Anna Belknap; Robert Joy; A. J. Buckley; Sela Ward
- Opening theme: "Baba O'Riley" by The Who
- Composer: Bill Brown
- Country of origin: United States
- Original language: English
- No. of seasons: 9
- No. of episodes: 197 (list of episodes)

Production
- Executive producers: Anthony E. Zuiker; Ann Donahue; Carol Mendelsohn; Jerry Bruckheimer; Pam Veasey; Jonathan Littman; Peter M. Lenkov; Wendy Battles; Zachary Reiter; Danny Cannon; Andrew Lipsitz; Sarah A. Barkley
- Producer: Gary Sinise
- Running time: 42–45 minutes
- Production companies: Jerry Bruckheimer Television; Alliance Atlantis (2004–2008; seasons 1–4); CBS Television Studios (Note: Known as CBS Productions from Seasons 1–2 and CBS Paramount Network Television from Seasons 3–5.)

Original release
- Network: CBS
- Release: September 22, 2004 – February 22, 2013

Related
- CSI: Crime Scene Investigation; CSI: Miami; CSI: Cyber; CSI: Vegas; Cold Case; Without a Trace

CSI: NY (Crime Scene Investigation: New York) is an American police procedural television series that aired on CBS from September 22, 2004, to February 22, 2013, for nine seasons and 197 original episodes. The show follows the investigative team of NYPD forensic scientists and police officers identified as "Crime Scene Investigators" (instead of the actual title of "Crime Scene Unit Forensic Technicians" (CSU)) as they unveil the circumstances behind mysterious and unusual deaths, as well as other crimes. The series is an indirect spin-off from the veteran series CSI: Crime Scene Investigation and a direct spin-off from CSI: Miami, during an episode in which several of the CSI: NY characters made their first appearances. It is the third series in the CSI franchise.

Originally in 2004, CSI: NY was produced in partnership with the Canadian media company Alliance Atlantis. The company dissolved after season three in 2007, and all production after that was done under the purview of CBS Paramount Television.

The series was filmed at the CBS Studio Center, with many of the outside scenes shot in and around Los Angeles. Occasionally, scenes were filmed on location in New York City.

The series aired its final episode on February 22, 2013. On May 10, 2013, CBS canceled the series after nine seasons.

Gary Sinise, Carmine Giovinazzo, Hill Harper and Eddie Cahill are the only actors to have appeared in all 197 episodes of the television series.

== Plot ==
CSI: NY follows a group of crime scene investigators (CSI's for short) who work for the New York Police Department's (NYPD for short) crime lab. The series mixes gritty subject matter and deduction in the same manner as its predecessors, yet also places a great deal of emphasis on criminal profiling. The team is led by Detective Mac Taylor, a former Marine from Chicago. Mac, a veteran of the NYPD, lost his wife on 9/11, and as such must work to rebuild his personal life while supervising his team. He is organized, efficient, dedicated, and very proper in his management style. Mac's partner is originally Detective Stella Bonasera. Stella is half-Greek, half-Italian. She helped Mac through the impact of his wife's death and has been by his side ever since. She is a savvy investigator, yet she often speaks before she thinks. Stella leaves New York to head a crime lab in New Orleans and is replaced by Detective Jo Danville. Jo is a former FBI criminalist and an experienced psychological profiler. She and Mac quickly form a strong friendship and an even stronger working rapport. Jo is still haunted by her ousting from the FBI after blowing the whistle on improper lab procedure, so she works to regain her professional reputation. Together, Mac, Stella, and Jo head an elite team of detectives including Detectives Danny Messer, Aiden Burn, and Lindsay Monroe. The team also works alongside former medical examiner-turned-CSI Sheldon Hawkes, Detective Don Flack, Medical Examiner Sid Hammerback, and CSI trainee Adam Ross.

== Cast and characters ==
Actor	Character	Seasons								
Actor	Character	1	2	3	4	5	6	7	8	9
Gary Sinise	Mac Taylor	Main	Main	Main	Main	Main	Main	Main	Main	Main
Melina Kanakaredes	Stella Bonasera	Main	Main	Main	Main	Main	Main			
Carmine Giovinazzo	Danny Messer	Main	Main	Main	Main	Main	Main	Main	Main	Main
Vanessa Ferlito	Aiden Burn	Main	Main							
Hill Harper	Sheldon Hawkes	Main	Main	Main	Main	Main	Main	Main	Main	Main
Eddie Cahill	Don Flack	Main	Main	Main	Main	Main	Main	Main	Main	Main
Anna Belknap	Lindsay Monroe Messer		Main	Main	Main	Main	Main	Main	Main	Main
Robert Joy	Sid Hammerback		Recurring	Recurring	Recurring	Main	Main	Main	Main	Main
A. J. Buckley	Adam Ross		Recurring	Recurring	Recurring	Main	Main	Main	Main	Main
Sela Ward	Jo Danville							Main	Main	Main

=== Main characters ===
- Mac Taylor (Gary Sinise) is a Detective First Grade and the director of the NYPD crime lab. Born in Chicago, Mac served as a major in the USMC, serving in both the 1983 Beirut barracks bombings and Operation Desert Storm, once saying that he had wanted to serve his country more than anything else in the world. Mac lost his wife, Claire, in the World Trade Center attacks, dates occasionally, and eventually proposes to an old friend, Christine Whitney, in the series finale.
- Stella Bonasera (Melina Kanakaredes) is a half-Greek, half-Italian orphan. She is a Detective First Grade with the NYPD and the Assistant CSI Supervisor of Mac's team. She often speaks before she thinks, leading to numerous complaints being made against her by those suspected of crimes. Never married and with no children, various episodes suggest she was subtly interested in Detective Taylor, but the latter was always shown to be grieving the death of his wife during the 9-11 terrorist attacks. Always going where she can do the most good, Stella resigns from the NYPD crime lab following the season-six finale to run the NOPD crime lab. (seasons 1–6)
- Danny Messer (Carmine Giovinazzo) is a Detective Third Grade and a Crime Scene Investigator working on Mac's team. Growing up in a family under surveillance Danny formulated his own set of hybrid ethics, blending the world of lawbreakers with the world of lawmakers. He is driven by ethics and one day hopes to run the New York crime lab, at one point taking a promotion to sergeant to put him on track to do so. He develops a romantic relationship with Lindsay Monroe.
- Aiden Burn (Vanessa Ferlito) is a Brooklyn native and a Detective Third Grade assigned to Taylor's team. In the first season she is the newest member of the CSI team, but is just as capable as any of them. She is fired from the crime lab after considering planting evidence on a rape suspect. Aiden goes on to apply for a private investigator's license and continues to investigate this suspect. She is fatally beaten and set on fire as a result, leaving the entire team devastated. During her murder, she was able to leave behind enough evidence to convict her killer. (seasons 1–2; guest star: season 2)
- Sheldon Hawkes, M.D. (Hill Harper) is a medical examiner with the NYC Office of the Chief Medical Examiner (OCME) when the series starts. He was a child prodigy who graduated from college at age 18 and was a board-licensed surgeon by the age of 24 and had several years experience in the emergency room. He left surgery because the pain of losing two patients was too intense. In the second season he becomes a CSI on Mac's team, although he is not a sworn NYPD detective like his colleagues.
- Don Flack (Eddie Cahill) is an NYPD Homicide Detective First Grade who comes from a long line of law enforcement officials. He bridges the gap between old-school NYPD and the new generation of CSI. His techniques are borderline yet effective. Despite being an NYPD strongman Flack is emotionally mature. He is left devastated when girlfriend Detective Jessica Angell is shot and killed on the job. Years later, he begins a relationship with Detective Jamie Lovato.
- Lindsay Monroe Messer (Anna Belknap) is a Detective Third Grade. She worked as a CSI in Montana and finally realized her dream of moving to a big city like New York. Her northwestern work ethic and willingness to tackle any job is a welcome addition to the team. She develops a romantic relationship with Danny Messer and the two marry in season five. Lindsay is awarded the Police Combat Cross by the NYPD for killing a psychopathic fugitive who had intruded her home. (seasons 2–9)
- Sid Hammerback, M.D. (Robert Joy) is the NYPD's Chief Medical Examiner. He is described as an "off-the-charts genius" who only recently traded in a career as a chef. He has two college-aged daughters and at least two ex-wives. He has a habit of over-talking and over-sharing, but despite any eccentricities on his part, Sid is extremely perceptive and sincerely cares for the well-being of his coworkers. He is diagnosed with cancer in season nine, only telling friend Jo Danville of his diagnosis. (seasons 5–9; recurring: seasons 2–4)
- Adam Ross (A. J. Buckley) is a lab tech originally from Phoenix, Arizona. His specialty is trace evidence. He sometimes accompanies the CSIs to crime scenes to aid in reconstruction or evidence collection. Outside work he dabbles in various subcultures from Second Life gaming to dating a Suicide Girl, and is a textbook modern geek. Stella Bonasera in particular develops a soft spot for the much younger Adam. (seasons 5–9; recurring: seasons 2–4)
- Jo Danville (Sela Ward) is a Detective First Grade, a skilled investigator, an unrivaled criminal profiler, and the most recent assistant supervisor on Mac's team. She was an FBI Supervisory Special Agent in Washington prior to her dismissal after she blew the whistle on a corrupt technician. She has a college-aged son, Tyler, from her previous marriage to a fellow FBI agent, and an adopted daughter, Ellie. (seasons 7–9)

== Music ==
The theme song for CSI: NY was taken from the first verse of The Who's "Baba O'Riley." For season four (and onward), the theme was revamped to be more instrumental, removing the lyrics: "I don't need to fight to prove I'm right. I don't need to be forgiven." The score composer for the series was Bill Brown, who won a BMI Award for season one.

== Episodes ==
Season	Episodes	Originally released		Rank	Viewers (in millions)
Season	Episodes	First released	Last released	Rank	Viewers (in millions)
Backdoor pilot		May 17, 2004		—N/a	—N/a
1	23	September 22, 2004	May 18, 2005	21	13.59
2	24	September 28, 2005	May 17, 2006	22	14.04
3	24	September 20, 2006	May 16, 2007	25	13.92
4	21	September 26, 2007	May 21, 2008	28	11.71
5	25	September 24, 2008	May 14, 2009	17	13.50
6	23	September 23, 2009	May 26, 2010	23	12.66
7	22	September 24, 2010	May 13, 2011	37	10.73
8	18	September 23, 2011	May 11, 2012	38	10.34
9	17	September 21, 2012	February 22, 2013	26	11.27

== Reception ==
=== Franchise ===
Like CSI: Crime Scene Investigation and CSI: Miami, CSI: NY has a comic book, novels, and a video game based on the show.

=== Nielsen ratings ===
Seasonal rankings (based on average total viewers per episode) of CSI: NY on CBS:

Note: Each U.S. network television season generally starts in late September and ends in late May, which coincides with the completion of May Sweeps.

Season	Episodes	Timeslot	Original airing			Rank	Viewers (in millions)
Season	Episodes	Timeslot	Season premiere	Season finale	TV season	Rank	Viewers (in millions)
1	23	Wednesday 10:00 pm	September 22, 2004	May 18, 2005	2004–2005	#21	13.59
2	24	Wednesday 10:00 pm	September 28, 2005	May 17, 2006	2005–2006	#22	14.04
3	24	Wednesday 10:00 pm	September 20, 2006	May 16, 2007	2006–2007	#25	13.92
4	21	Wednesday 10:00 pm	September 26, 2007	May 21, 2008	2007–2008	#28	11.71
5	25	Wednesday 10:00 pm	September 24, 2008	May 14, 2009	2008–2009	#17	13.50
6	23	Wednesday 10:00 pm	September 23, 2009	May 26, 2010	2009–2010	#23	12.66
7	22	Friday 9:00 pm	September 24, 2010	May 13, 2011	2010–2011	#37	10.73
8	18	Friday 9:00 pm	September 23, 2011	May 11, 2012	2011–2012	#38	10.34
9	17	Friday 8:00 pm (1–2); Friday 9:00 pm (3–17)	September 28, 2012	February 22, 2013	2012–2013	#26	11.27

== Broadcast history ==
=== United States ===
- First run – Broadcast on CBS from September 2004 to September 2010 on Wednesdays at 10 pm/9c, and from September 2010 to February 2013 on Fridays at 9 pm/8c (except for the first two episodes of season 9 which aired at 8 pm/7c).
- Repeats – Spike TV acquired the rerun rights to CSI: NY in November 2004. Both A&E and Spike TV shared the rerun rights to the crossover episodes (with CSI: Miami) "Felony Flight" and "Manhattan Manhunt". Spike TV began sharing the rights to air CSI: NY with TNT. Spike TV aired the show in the daytime (1–3 p.m.) and early evening (5–7 p.m.), leaving TNT to air the show in primetime. The show currently airs on Charge! as of 2022.

=== Australia and New Zealand ===
- In Australia Nine Network aired new episodes of CSI: NY, and repeats were shown on satellite channel TVH!TS (formerly TV1).
- In New Zealand, the show aired on TV3 Saturdays at 9:30 pm, with the final first-run episode of the series broadcast on May 3, 2014.

=== United Kingdom ===
- First run – Seasons one through eight were aired on Saturday nights at 10 pm on Channel 5. The channel moved the show to broadcast at 9 pm on Tuesday nights starting July 30, 2013, for the ninth and final season. On October 22, 2013, Channel 5 aired a night of the show spanning from 9 to 11:50 pm. From 9 to 10:55 pm, the final two episodes aired, concluding both the ninth season and the series. These were followed at 10:55 to 11:50 pm by a special screening of the first episode "Blink" to round off the show.
- Repeats – Shown on Channel 5, 5USA, CBS Drama, and the former Universal Channel. It was also available on Demand 5, for a week after the Channel 5 broadcast date. Channel 5 aired the newest season starting late July through till the autumn with CSI: Crime Scene Investigation then began its seasonal run in late January or early February of the following year. Channel 5 broadcast the season each week until it reached the last episode, unlike in the U.S. In mid-May 2020 the series began a repeat from the first episode on CBS Justice.

== Other releases ==
=== Online sales ===
Country	Store	Available seasons
France	TF1 Vision	No longer available
Germany	VOXnow	2, 3, 4, 5, 6, 7, 8
Hong Kong	Deltamac	No longer available
International	Netflix	No longer available
United Kingdom	Demand 5	No longer available
United States	iTunes Store	1, 2, 3, 4, 5, 6, 7, 8, 9

Some episodes are available to stream on Paramount+.
