= Eddie Cahill =

American actor (born 1978)

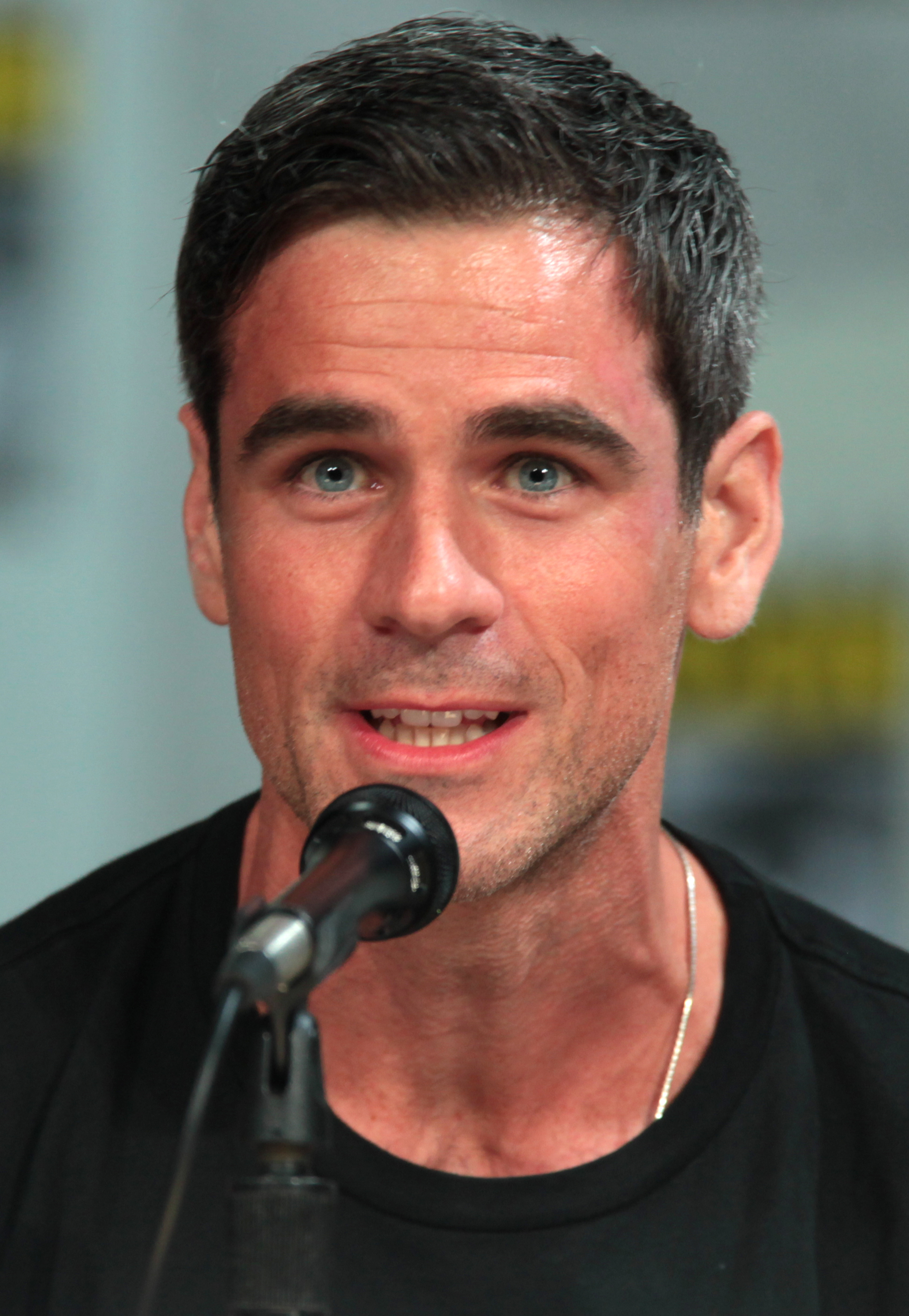
- Cahill in 2014
- Born: January 15, 1978 (age 48); The Bronx, New York, U.S.
- Occupation: Actor
- Years active: 1999–present
- Spouse: Nikki Uberti (m. 2009)
- Children: 1

Edmund Patrick Cahill (born January 15, 1978) is an American actor known for portraying "Miracle on Ice" goalie Jim Craig in the 2004 film Miracle, and for playing the roles of Tag Jones in Friends and Detective Don Flack in CSI: NY. He has had numerous roles in television, films, and theater. His most recent starring role was in 2016 as District Attorney Conner Wallace in Conviction.

== Early life ==
Cahill was born in the Bronx, New York. He is the middle of three children with an older and a younger sister. He is of Irish descent from his father, a stockbroker, and of Italian descent from his mother, an elementary school teacher.

Cahill graduated from Byram Hills High School in Armonk, New York in 1996. He attended Skidmore College in Saratoga Springs, New York and the Atlantic Theater Acting School, part of the New York University Tisch School of the Arts.

== Career ==
In 2000 Cahill performed in Nicky Silver's Off-Broadway production of The Altruists. He was noticed by Sarah Jessica Parker and shortly after he made several television guest-star appearances including Sex and the City, Felicity, and Law & Order: Special Victims Unit. Cahill was also a recurring guest-star in the NBC sitcom Friends as Rachel's young assistant and boyfriend, Tag Jones. In 2002, he starred in a short-lived WB drama, Glory Days.

In the 2004 hockey movie Miracle, Cahill had the chance to play his boyhood hero, goalie Jim Craig. He had never played the goaltender position prior to the movie, so most of the game-action sequences of Craig were filmed with former NHL goalie Bill Ranford doubling for Cahill, although Cahill did shoot several key sequences from within goal.

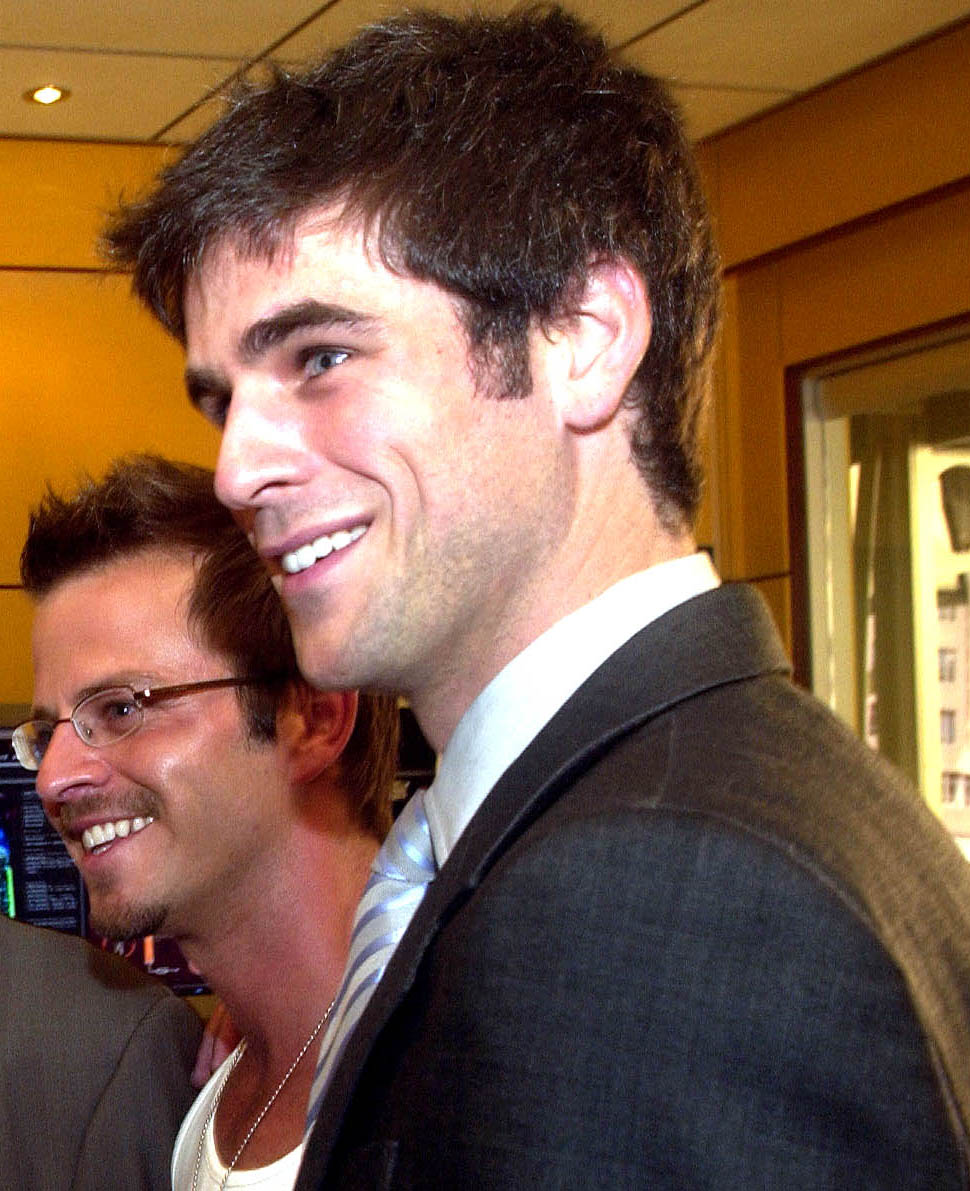
Cahill in 2005

When CBS decided in 2004 to create a third CSI series, CSI: NY, to add to its franchise, Cahill was hired to play the cocky, snarky homicide detective, Don Flack, who backs up the team of CSIs. The show ran for nine seasons and he was in all 197 episodes.

Cahill went back to the Atlantic Theater Company in June 2011 and performed at the conclusion of its 25th Anniversary season. He was in Tom Donaghy's one-act play, I Need a Quote, about "a hilarious telephone conversation between a single mother and a home insurance salesman."

In the summer of 2012 Cahill performed in David Adjmi's play, 3C, at the Rattlestick Playwrights Theater in New York City. He played "annoying neighbor Terry, a swinging bachelor true to the era, who unlike everyone else in this play, has no deep feelings at all."

In 2014, Cahill was cast as a main character starting in the second season of the CBS summer drama Under the Dome. He played Sam Verdreaux, a former EMT and reclusive brother-in-law to "Big Jim" Rennie. The series was canceled after three seasons.

Cahill was cast as the male lead in the 2016 ABC legal drama Conviction. He played Manhattan District Attorney Conner Wallace, who creates the Conviction Integrity Unit, which is set up to re-examine cases where there is a credible suspicion of wrongful conviction. The series was canceled after one season.

In 2019 Cahill played a charismatic criminal in a three-part story arc in CBS's NCIS: New Orleans. Among other crimes he was involved in the death of NCIS Special Agent Christopher Lasalle. In this series, he reunited with his former CSI: NY co-star, Vanessa Ferlito.

== Personal life ==
Cahill married his longtime girlfriend Nikki Uberti in Los Angeles on July 12, 2009. Uberti is a makeup artist, former model, and ex-wife of photographer Terry Richardson. The couple have a son who was born in 2009.

On his right shoulder Cahill has a tattoo of his wife's name in a heart with an arrow through it and a swallow on top.

Cahill is an avid New York Rangers hockey fan and wrote an NHL Celeb Blog for three seasons.

== Filmography ==
| Year | Title | Role | Notes |
|---|---|---|---|
Stage
| 1999 | Gramercy Park is Closed to the Public | Dex | Powerhouse Theater |
| 2000 | The Altruists | Lance | Vineyard Theatre |
| 2011 | I Need a Quote | Salesman | Atlantic Theater Company |
| 2012 | 3C | Terry | Rattlestick Playwrights Theater |
| 2019 | Nassim | n/a | New York City Center |
| 2019 | The Hard Problem | Jerry Krohl | James Bridges Theater |
Television
| 2000 | Sex and the City | Sean | Episode 3.04 "Boy, Girl, Boy, Girl..." |
| 2000–2001 | Friends | Tag Jones | Episodes 7.04 "The One with Rachel's Assistant"; 7.05 "The One with the Engagement Picture"; 7.08 "The One Where Chandler Doesn't Like Dogs"; 7.09 "The One with All the Candy"; 7.12 "The One Where They're Up All Night"; 7.14 "The One Where They All Turn Thirty"; 8.02 "The One with the Red Sweater" |
| 2000 | Charmed | Sean | Episode 3.05 "Sight Unseen" |
| 2000 | Felicity | James | Episodes 3.09 "James and the Giant Piece"; 3.10 "Let's Get It On" aka "Final Touches"; 3.11 "And to All a Good Night" |
| 2001 | Law & Order: Special Victims Unit | Tommy Dowd | Episode 2.17 "Folly" |
| 2002 | Glory Days | Mike Dolan | All 9 episodes |
| 2002 | Haunted | Nicholas Trenton | Episodes 1.07 "A Three-Hour Tour"; 1.09 "Simon Redux" |
| 2002 | Dawson's Creek | Max Winter | Episode 6.09 "Everything Put Together Falls Apart" |
| 2004–2013 | CSI: NY | Don Flack | All 197 episodes |
| 2014–2015 | Under the Dome | Sam Verdreaux | 26 episodes (2.01–3.13) |
| 2016–2017 | Conviction | Conner Wallace | All 13 episodes |
| 2018 | Hawaii Five-0 | Carson Rodes | Episode 9.06 "Aia i Hi'ikua; i Hi'ialo" ("Is Borne on the Back; Is Borne in the Arms") |
| 2019 | L.A.'s Finest | Michael Alber | Episodes 1.12 "Armageddon"; 1.13 "Bad Girls" |
| 2019 | NCIS: New Orleans | Eddie Barrett | Episodes 6.06 "Matthew 5:9"; 6.09 "Convicted"; 6.10 "Requital" |
| 2021 | Fantasy Island | Jake / James | Episodes 1.09 "Welcome to the Snow Globe, Part One"; 1.10 "Welcome to the Snow Globe, Part Two" |
| 2023 | Blue Bloods | Chief Paul Gallagher | Episode 13.10 "Fake It 'Til You Make It" |
Film
| 2004 | Miracle | Jim Craig | Bill Ranford doubled for most of the on-ice action. |
| 2005 | Lords of Dogtown | Larry Gordon | |
| 2008 | This Is Not a Test | Robert Forte | Cahill worked with CSI: NY castmates Hill Harper and Carmine Giovinazzo. |
| 2008 | The Narrows | Nicky Shades | Cahill was burned when a special effect went wrong. |
| 2019 | Sextpert Advice | Sydney | Short film |
| 2024 | Omni Loop | Mark | |
| 2025 | Materialists | Robert | |
Other
| 2004 | The Making of "Miracle" | Himself | Video short documentary |
| 2004 | From Hockey to Hollywood: Actors' Journeys | Himself | Video short documentary |
| 2008 | CSI: NY – The Game | Don Flack | Video game (voice only) |
