= Carmine Giovinazzo =

American actor (born 1973)

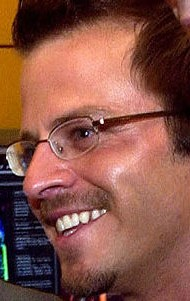
- Giovinazzo in 2008
- Born: Carmine Dominick Giovinazzo; August 24, 1973 (age 53); New York City, U.S.
- Occupations: Actor; writer; painter; musician
- Years active: 1996–present
- Spouse: Vanessa Marcil (m. 2010; div. 2013)
- Relatives: Buddy Giovinazzo (cousin); Larry Romano (cousin)

Carmine Dominick Giovinazzo (/ˈkɑːrmaɪn dʒiˌoʊvɪˈnɑːzoʊ/ KAR-myne jee-OH-vin-AH-zoh, born August 24, 1973), is an American actor, writer, painter and musician, known for his role as Detective Danny Messer in CSI: NY.

== Early life ==
Giovinazzo was born and raised in the Port Richmond neighborhood of Staten Island, New York, the son of Nancy and Dominick Giovinazzo, a retired NYPD police officer. Growing up, Giovinazzo was an avid athlete. He played baseball for 4 years at Port Richmond High School where he was an Advance all-star as a senior, eventually graduating in 1991, and went on to attend Wagner College on a baseball scholarship. He had hoped to become a professional baseball player, but a serious back injury dashed his career plans; with the support of his family, he turned to acting. He studied acting at Wagner College and HB Studios and spent four years working mostly non-paying roles in the New York area.

== Career ==
In 1997, Giovinazzo moved to Los Angeles. Not long afterward, he successfully landed his first Hollywood role in the pilot of Buffy the Vampire Slayer, in which his character was the show's first on-screen victim. Afterwards, he appeared in numerous guest-starring roles on television and in film, including the Learning Curve, Billy's Hollywood Screen Kiss, For Love of the Game, The Big Brass Ring, and Black Hawk Down. He was also cast as one of the stars of the short-lived UPN sitcom Shasta McNasty, which was nominated for a People's Choice Award. Other films in which he had starring roles include In Enemy Hands with William H. Macy, and Players with Freddy Rodriguez and Peter Dobson. He played Tony Galper, the victim in the final episode of the TV series Columbo.

Giovinazzo was cast as forensic scientist Danny Messer on the hit TV series CSI: NY and is the first actor to appear in all three CSI series; his character was introduced in the CSI: Miami episode "MIA/NYC NonStop" (along with the other CSI: NY cast members), and he guest-starred in season three of the Las Vegas-based original series as street racer Thumpy G in the episode "Revenge is Best Served Cold" (though it is never specified that this guest spot was in any way related to his character on CSI: NY). Giovinazzo penned season six's vampire-themed episode "Sanguine Love", joining series leads Melina Kanakaredes and Gary Sinise who have also written episodes for the series.

In 2014, Giovinazzo portrayed the recurring role of Sid Markham in season two of the USA television series Graceland. In this series, he reunited with his former CSI: NY co-star Vanessa Ferlito.

== Personal life ==
Giovinazzo plays the guitar, and writes songs and poetry. He is also a painter, mostly in oils, and one of his paintings appeared in the "Tri-Borough" episode of CSI: NY. He is currently a lead vocalist in the band Ceesau, which released one album, Era of the Exposed (2008). The song "Tear To Spare", from this album, was played in the CSI: NY sixth-season episode "Sanguine Love", which Giovinazzo wrote.

Giovinazzo is a cousin of Buddy Giovinazzo and Larry Romano.

Giovinazzo married actress Vanessa Marcil on July 11, 2010, in a private ceremony in New York City. Marcil filed for divorce in August 2012 on the basis of irreconcilable differences. The divorce was finalized in March 2013.

== Filmography ==
Year	Title	Role	Notes
1996	Conception	Billy	Film short
1996	No Way Home	Frankie Hamm	Film
1997	Buffy the Vampire Slayer	Christopher Boal	Episode 1.01 "Welcome to the Hellmouth"
1997	Pacific Blue	Cody Fisher	Episode 3.08 "Matters of the Heart"
1998	Fallen Arches	Frankie Romano	Film
1998	Billy's Hollywood Screen Kiss	Gundy	Film
1999	The Big Brass Ring	Young Billy	Film
1999	Providence	Kit	Episode 1.17 "Heaven Can Wait"
2001	The Learning Curve	Paul Cleveland	Film
1999	For Love of the Game	Ken Strout	Film
1999	Shasta McNasty	Scott	All 22 episodes
2000	Terror Tract	Frank Sarno	Film ("Nightmare" segment)
2001	Black Hawk Down	SGT Mike Goodale	Film
2002	Big Shot: Confessions of a Campus Bookie	T-Bone	TV movie
2002	CSI: Crime Scene Investigation	Thumpy G	Episode 3.01 "Revenge is Best Served Cold"
2003	Columbo	Tony Galper	Episode 13.05 "Columbo Likes the Nightlife"
2004	In Enemy Hands	Buck Cooper	Film
2004	CSI: Miami	Danny Messer	Episode 2.23 "MIA/NYC NonStop"
2004–2013	CSI: NY	Danny Messer	All 197 episodes
2008	This Is Not a Test	Trey	Film
2014–2015	Graceland	Sid Markham	9 episodes (2.06–3.02)
2015	The Player	Ray	Episode 1.04 "The Big Blind"
2016	Criminal Minds	Andrew Meeks	Episode 11.15 "A Badge and a Gun"
2018	Duke	Dare	Film
2020	Chicago Med	Tyler	Episode 5.16 "Who Should Be the Judge"
2020	Batwoman	Johnny Sabatino	Episode: "If You Believe in Me, I'll Believe in You"
2022	The Offer	Sonny Grosso	Miniseries
2025	Alert: Missing Persons Unit	Supervisory Special Agent Vince Kelly	Season 3, Episode 8 “Carmen”
2025	The Pitt	Ivan Pugliesi	Season 1, Episode 11 "5:00 P.M."
