= List of CSI: NY episodes =

CSI: NY is a CBS police procedural drama series created as second spin-off of CSI: Crime Scene Investigation. This edition follows a New York City forensics team headed by Mac Taylor. The series ran from September 22, 2004, to February 22, 2013. Over the nine seasons, a total of 197 original episodes of CSI: NY were aired.

== Series overview ==
Season	Episodes	Originally released		Rank	Viewers (in millions)
Season	Episodes	First released	Last released	Rank	Viewers (in millions)
Backdoor pilot		May 17, 2004		—N/a	—N/a
1	23	September 22, 2004	May 18, 2005	21	13.59
2	24	September 28, 2005	May 17, 2006	22	14.04
3	24	September 20, 2006	May 16, 2007	25	13.92
4	21	September 26, 2007	May 21, 2008	28	11.71
5	25	September 24, 2008	May 14, 2009	17	13.50
6	23	September 23, 2009	May 26, 2010	23	12.66
7	22	September 24, 2010	May 13, 2011	37	10.73
8	18	September 23, 2011	May 11, 2012	38	10.34
9	17	September 21, 2012	February 22, 2013	26	11.27

== Episodes ==
=== Pilot—CSI: Miami ===
CSI: Miami Series No.	CSI: Miami Season 2 No.	Title	Directed by	Written by	Original air date	US viewers (millions)
47	23	"MIA/NYC NonStop"	Danny Cannon	Anthony E. Zuiker, Ann Donahue & Carol Mendelsohn	May 17, 2004	23.08
When a teenage girl returns home from a big party night at an underage club to find her parents murdered, the search for the killer leads Miami CSI Horatio Caine to New York City. Before he arrives, the New York detectives, led by Detective Mac Taylor are called out to investigate the shooting of an undercover police officer—who, it turns out, is the lead suspect in the Miami case. However, the medical examiner determines that he has been dead for 72 hours and could not have been alive at the time of the double murder in Miami. After further investigation, Horatio and Mac determine that the real killer murdered the New York cop, then used his ID to get to Miami, and is still on the loose.

=== Season 1 (2004–05) ===
No. overall	No. in season	Title	Directed by	Written by	Original release date	Prod. code	US viewers (millions)
1	1	"Blink"	Deran Sarafian	Anthony E. Zuiker	September 22, 2004	101	19.26
2	2	"Creatures of the Night"	Tim Hunter	Pam Veasey	September 29, 2004	103	19.47
3	3	"American Dreamers"	Rob Bailey	Eli Talbert	October 6, 2004	104	16.89
4	4	"Grand Master"	Kevin Bray	Zachary Reiter	October 27, 2004	105	12.98
5	5	"A Man a Mile"	David Grossman	Andrew Lipsitz	November 3, 2004	102	14.71
6	6	"Outside Man"	Rob Bailey	Timothy J. Lea	November 10, 2004	107	15.38
7	7	"Rain"	David Grossman	Pam Veasey	November 17, 2004	108	17.46
8	8	"Three Generations are Enough"	Alex Zakrzewski	Andrew Lipsitz	November 24, 2004	109	13.50
9	9	"Officer Blue"	Deran Sarafian	Anthony E. Zuiker	December 1, 2004	110	14.92
10	10	"Night, Mother"	Deran Sarafian	Janet Tamaro	December 15, 2004	106	15.60
11	11	"Tri-Borough"	Greg Yaitanes	Eli Talbert & Andrew Lipsitz	January 5, 2005	111	12.15
12	12	"Recycling"	Alex Zakrzewski	Timothy J. Lea & Zachary Reiter	January 12, 2005	112	13.66
13	13	"Tanglewood"	Karen Gaviola	Anthony E. Zuiker	January 26, 2005	113	17.56
14	14	"Blood, Sweat and Tears"	Scott Lautanen	Eli Talbert & Erica Shelton	February 9, 2005	114	13.08
15	15	"'Til Death Do We Part"	Nelson McCormick	Pam Veasey	February 16, 2005	115	14.04
16	16	"Hush"	Deran Sarafian	Anthony E. Zuiker & Timothy J. Lea	February 23, 2005	116	14.31
17	17	"The Fall"	Norberto Barba	Story by : Bill Haynes; Teleplay by : Anne McGrail	March 2, 2005	117	13.62
18	18	"The Dove Commission"	Emilio Estevez	Anthony E. Zuiker & Zachary Reiter	March 23, 2005	118	16.73
19	19	"Crime and Misdemeanor"	Rob Bailey	Eli Talbert & Andrew Lipsitz	April 13, 2005	119	11.00
20	20	"Supply and Demand"	Joe Chappelle	Erica Shelton & Anne McGrail	April 27, 2005	120	14.84
21	21	"On the Job"	David Von Ancken	Timothy J. Lea	May 4, 2005	121	13.42
22	22	"The Closer"	Emilio Estevez	Pam Veasey	May 11, 2005	122	14.55
23	23	"What You See Is What You See"	Duane Clark	Andrew Lipsitz	May 18, 2005	123	12.30

=== Season 2 (2005–06) ===
No. overall	No. in season	Title	Directed by	Written by	Original release date	Prod. code	US viewers (millions)
24	1	"Summer in the City"	David Von Ancken	Pam Veasey	September 28, 2005	201	13.30
25	2	"Grand Murder at Central Station"	Scott Lautanen	Zachary Reiter	October 5, 2005	202	14.57
26	3	"Zoo York"	Norberto Barba	Peter M. Lenkov & Timothy J. Lea	October 12, 2005	203	15.23
27	4	"Corporate Warriors"	Rob Bailey	Andrew Lipsitz	October 19, 2005	204	14.00
28	5	"Dancing with the Fishes"	John Peters	Eli Talbert	October 26, 2005	205	15.31
29	6	"YoungBlood"	Steven DePaul	Timothy J. Lea	November 2, 2005	206	15.70
30	7	"Manhattan Manhunt"	Rob Bailey	Elizabeth Devine & Anthony E. Zuiker & Ann Donahue	November 9, 2005	207	19.23
31	8	"Bad Beat"	Duane Clark	Zachary Reiter	November 16, 2005	208	15.69
32	9	"City of the Dolls"	Norberto Barba	Pam Veasey	November 23, 2005	209	14.52
33	10	"Jamalot"	Jonathan Glassner	Andrew Lipsitz	November 30, 2005	210	15.85
34	11	"Trapped"	James Whitmore Jr.	Peter M. Lenkov	December 14, 2005	211	16.49
35	12	"Wasted"	Jeff T. Thomas	Pam Veasey & Bill Haynes	January 18, 2006	212	15.55
36	13	"Risk"	Rob Bailey	John Dove & Anthony E. Zuiker	January 25, 2006	213	14.89
37	14	"Stuck on You"	Jonathan Glassner	Timothy J. Lea & Eli Talbert	February 1, 2006	214	16.42
38	15	"Fare Game"	Kevin Dowling	Zachary Reiter & Peter M. Lenkov	March 1, 2006	215	13.76
39	16	"Cool Hunter"	Norberto Barba	Daniele Nathanson	March 8, 2006	216	13.91
40	17	"Necrophilia Americana"	Steven DePaul	Andrew Lipsitz	March 22, 2006	217	13.93
41	18	"Live or Let Die"	Rob Bailey	Story by : Gary Sinise & Michael Daly; Teleplay by : Pam Veasey	March 29, 2006	218	14.81
42	19	"Super Men"	Steven DePaul	Story by : Peter M. Lenkov; Teleplay by : Peter M. Lenkov & Pam Veasey	April 12, 2006	219	14.14
43	20	"Run Silent, Run Deep"	Rob Bailey	Anthony E. Zuiker	April 19, 2006	220	15.14
44	21	"All Access"	Norberto Barba	Timothy J. Lea & Anthony E. Zuiker	April 26, 2006	221	15.23
45	22	"Stealing Home"	Oz Scott	Zachary Reiter	May 3, 2006	222	14.68
46	23	"Heroes"	Anthony Hemingway	Eli Talbert	May 10, 2006	223	15.16
47	24	"Charge of This Post"	Rob Bailey	Timothy J. Lea	May 17, 2006	224	13.23

=== Season 3 (2006–07) ===
No. overall	No. in season	Title	Directed by	Written by	Original release date	US viewers (millions)
48	1	"People with Money"	Rob Bailey	Pam Veasey & Peter M. Lenkov	September 20, 2006	16.11
49	2	"Not What It Looks Like"	Duane Clark	Pam Veasey & Peter M. Lenkov	September 27, 2006	16.21
50	3	"Love Run Cold"	Tim Iacofano	Timothy J. Lea	October 4, 2006	15.73
51	4	"Hung Out to Dry"	Anthony Hemingway	Zachary Reiter	October 11, 2006	17.97
52	5	"Oedipus Hex"	Scott Lautanen	Anthony E. Zuiker & Ken Solarz	October 18, 2006	15.99
53	6	"Open and Shut"	Joe Ann Fogle	Wendy Battles	October 25, 2006	17.42
54	7	"Murder Sings the Blues"	Oz Scott	Sam Humphrey	November 1, 2006	16.64
55	8	"Consequences"	Rob Bailey	Pam Veasey	November 8, 2006	16.78
56	9	"And Here's to You, Mrs. Azrael"	David Von Ancken	Peter M. Lenkov	November 15, 2006	16.18
57	10	"Sweet Sixteen"	David Jackson	Ken Solarz	November 22, 2006	15.31
58	11	"Raising Shane"	Christine Moore	Zachary Reiter & Pam Veasey	November 29, 2006	16.43
59	12	"Silent Night"	Rob Bailey	Sam Humphrey, Peter M. Lenkov & Anthony E. Zuiker	December 13, 2006	15.83
60	13	"Obsession"	Jeffrey Hunt	Jeremy Littman	January 17, 2007	13.77
61	14	"The Lying Game"	Anthony Hemingway	Wendy Battles	January 24, 2007	13.35
62	15	"Some Buried Bones"	Rob Bailey	Noah Nelson	February 7, 2007	14.97
63	16	"Heart of Glass"	David Jackson	Bill Haynes & Pam Veasey	February 14, 2007	14.81
64	17	"The Ride-In"	Steven DePaul	Peter M. Lenkov	February 21, 2007	13.68
65	18	"Sleight Out of Hand"	Rob Bailey	John Dove & Zachary Reiter	February 28, 2007	14.33
66	19	"A Daze of Wine and Roaches"	Oz Scott	Timothy J. Lea & Daniele Nathanson	March 21, 2007	13.64
67	20	"What Schemes May Come"	Christine Moore	Bruce Zimmerman	April 11, 2007	12.64
68	21	"Past Imperfect"	Oz Scott	Wendy Battles	April 25, 2007	11.40
69	22	"Cold Reveal"	Marshall Adams	Pam Veasey & Sam Humphrey	May 2, 2007	13.00
70	23	"...Comes Around"	Rob Bailey	Daniele Nathanson & Pam Veasey	May 9, 2007	12.83
71	24	"Snow Day"	Duane Clark	Pam Veasey & Peter M. Lenkov	May 16, 2007	13.07

=== Season 4 (2007–08) ===
No. overall	No. in season	Title	Directed by	Written by	Original release date	US viewers (millions)
72	1	"Can You Hear Me Now?"	David Von Ancken	Zachary Reiter & Pam Veasey	September 26, 2007	12.72
73	2	"The Deep"	Oz Scott	Wendy Battles	October 3, 2007	12.69
74	3	"You Only Die Once"	Jonathan Glassner	Sam Humphrey	October 10, 2007	13.43
75	4	"Time's Up"	Rob Bailey	Trey Callaway	October 17, 2007	13.99
76	5	"Down the Rabbit Hole"	Christine Moore	Sam Humphrey & Peter M. Lenkov	October 24, 2007	13.82
77	6	"Boo"	Joe Dante	Peter M. Lenkov & Daniele Nathanson	October 31, 2007	13.40
78	7	"Commuted Sentences"	Oz Scott	John Dove	November 7, 2007	12.92
79	8	"Buzzkill"	Jeffrey Hunt	Jill Abbinanti	November 14, 2007	13.13
80	9	"One Wedding and a Funeral"	Rob Bailey	Barbie Kligman	November 21, 2007	14.56
81	10	"The Thing About Heroes"	Anthony Hemingway	Pam Veasey	November 28, 2007	14.19
82	11	"Child's Play"	Jeffrey Hunt	Trey Callaway & Pam Veasey	December 12, 2007	14.36
83	12	"Happily Never After"	Marshall Adams	Daniele Nathanson & Noah Nelson	January 9, 2008	11.71
84	13	"All in the Family"	Rob Bailey	Wendy Battles	January 23, 2008	11.51
85	14	"Playing with Matches"	Christine Moore	Bill Haynes	February 6, 2008	10.16
86	15	"DOA for a Day"	Christine Moore	John Dove & Peter M. Lenkov	April 2, 2008	12.85
87	16	"Right Next Door"	Rob Bailey	Pam Veasey	April 9, 2008	12.38
88	17	"Like Water for Murder"	Anthony Hemingway	Sam Humphrey	April 16, 2008	13.43
89	18	"Admissions"	Rob Bailey	Zachary Reiter	April 30, 2008	11.51
90	19	"Personal Foul"	David Von Ancken	Trey Callaway	May 7, 2008	12.73
91	20	"Taxi"	Christine Moore	Barbie Kligman & John Dove	May 14, 2008	11.86
92	21	"Hostage"	Rob Bailey	Zachary Reiter & Peter M. Lenkov	May 21, 2008	11.83

=== Season 5 (2008–09) ===
No. overall	No. in season	Title	Directed by	Written by	Original release date	US viewers (millions)
93	1	"Veritas"	David Von Ancken	Zachary Reiter & Pam Veasey	September 24, 2008	14.59
94	2	"Page Turner"	Frederick E. O. Toye	Trey Callaway	October 1, 2008	14.88
95	3	"Turbulence"	Matt Earl Beesley	Gary Sinise & Jeremy Littman	October 8, 2008	15.87
96	4	"Sex, Lies and Silicone"	Jonathan Glassner	Wendy Battles	October 22, 2008	14.39
97	5	"The Cost of Living"	Rob Bailey	John Dove	October 29, 2008	13.75
98	6	"Enough"	Alex Zakrzewski	Zachary Reiter	November 5, 2008	11.80
99	7	"Dead Inside"	Christine Moore	Pam Veasey & Daniele Nathanson	November 12, 2008	11.62
100	8	"My Name Is Mac Taylor"	Rob Bailey	Pam Veasey	November 19, 2008	14.12
101	9	"The Box"	Oz Scott	Peter M. Lenkov & Bill Haynes	November 26, 2008	12.30
102	10	"The Triangle"	Jeff T. Thomas	Trey Callaway	December 10, 2008	13.33
103	11	"Forbidden Fruit"	John Behring	Peter M. Lenkov & Jill Abbinanti	December 17, 2008	13.38
104	12	"Help"	David M. Barrett	Sam Humphrey	January 14, 2009	12.67
105	13	"Rush to Judgement"	Rob Bailey	Wendy Battles	January 21, 2009	11.58
106	14	"She's Not There"	Nelson McCormick	John Dove & Pam Veasey	February 11, 2009	11.94
107	15	"The Party's Over"	Oz Scott	Barbie Kligman	February 18, 2009	12.33
108	16	"No Good Deed"	Matt Earl Beesley	Rusty Cundieff & Floyd Byars	February 25, 2009	12.56
109	17	"Green Piece"	Jeffrey Hunt	Zachary Reiter	March 11, 2009	13.63
110	18	"Point of No Return"	Rob Bailey	Peter M. Lenkov & Bill Haynes	March 18, 2009	12.79
111	19	"Communication Breakdown"	John Keris	Trey Callaway	March 25, 2009	12.64
112	20	"Prey"	Marshall Adams	Wendy Battles & Noah Nelson	April 8, 2009	12.50
113	21	"The Past, Present and Murder"	David Von Ancken	Sam Humphrey & Danielle Nathanson	April 15, 2009	12.14
114	22	"Yahrzeit"	Norberto Barba	Barbie Kligman & Peter M. Lenkov	April 29, 2009	12.50
115	23	"Greater Good"	Alex Zakrzewski	Pam Veasey	May 6, 2009	13.40
116	24	"Grounds for Deception"	Duane Clark	Melina Kanakaredes	May 13, 2009	12.33
117	25	"Pay Up"	Rob Bailey	Story by : Peter M. Lenkov; Teleplay by : Zachary Reiter & John Dove	May 14, 2009	12.77

=== Season 6 (2009–10) ===
No. overall	No. in season	Title	Directed by	Written by	Original release date	US viewers (millions)
118	1	"Epilogue"	David Von Ancken	Pam Veasey	September 23, 2009	15.06
119	2	"Blacklist"	Duane Clark	Peter M. Lenkov	September 30, 2009	13.16
120	3	"Lat 40° 47' N/Long 73° 58' W"	Matt Earl Beesley	Trey Callaway	October 7, 2009	12.43
121	4	"Dead Reckoning"	Scott White	John Dove	October 14, 2009	13.40
122	5	"Battle Scars"	Jeff T. Thomas	Bill Haynes	October 21, 2009	13.01
123	6	"It Happened to Me"	Alex Zakrzewski	Wendy Battles & Pam Veasey	November 4, 2009	12.00
124	7	"Hammer Down"	Scott Lautanen	Peter M. Lenkov & Pam Veasey	November 11, 2009	14.51
125	8	"Cuckoo's Nest"	Jeffrey Hunt	Zachary Reiter & Aaron Rahsaan Thomas	November 18, 2009	13.62
126	9	"Manhattanhenge"	Matt Earl Beesley	Trey Callaway	November 25, 2009	12.68
127	10	"Death House"	Norberto Barba	JP Donahue & Kevin Polay	December 9, 2009	12.97
128	11	"Second Chances"	Eric Laneuville	John Dove	December 16, 2009	13.55
129	12	"Criminal Justice"	Christine Moore	Bill Haynes	January 13, 2010	14.03
130	13	"Flag on the Play"	Jeffrey Hunt	Wendy Battles	January 20, 2010	13.54
131	14	"Sanguine Love"	Norberto Barba	Carmine Giovinazzo	February 3, 2010	14.16
132	15	"The Formula"	Matt Earl Beesley	Aaron Rahsaan Thomas	February 10, 2010	12.98
133	16	"Uncertainty Rules"	Jeff T. Thomas	Zachary Reiter	March 3, 2010	12.35
134	17	"Pot of Gold"	Eriq La Salle	Trey Callaway	March 10, 2010	11.07
135	18	"Rest in Peace, Marina Garito"	Allison Liddi-Brown	Pam Veasey	April 7, 2010	10.64
136	19	"Redemptio"	Steven DePaul	Peter M. Lenkov & Bill Haynes	April 14, 2010	10.85
137	20	"Tales from the Undercard"	Skipp Sudduth	Aaron Rahsaan Thomas & Steven Fidler	May 5, 2010	10.30
138	21	"Unusual Suspects"	Marshall Adams	John Dove & Wendy Battles	May 12, 2010	11.36
139	22	"Point of View"	Alex Zakrzewski	Pam Veasey	May 19, 2010	11.30
140	23	"Vacation Getaway"	Duane Clark	Trey Callaway & Zachary Reiter	May 26, 2010	11.96

=== Season 7 (2010–11) ===
No. overall	No. in season	Title	Directed by	Written by	Original release date	US viewers (millions)
141	1	"The 34th Floor"	Duane Clark	John Dove & Pam Veasey	September 24, 2010	10.35
142	2	"Unfriendly Chat"	Eric Laneuville	Trey Callaway	October 1, 2010	9.70
143	3	"Damned If You Do"	Christine Moore	Zachary Reiter	October 8, 2010	9.89
144	4	"Sangre Por Sangre"	Norberto Barba	Aaron Rahsaan Thomas	October 15, 2010	9.57
145	5	"Out of the Sky"	Nathan Hope	Christopher Silber	October 22, 2010	10.25
146	6	"Do Not Pass Go"	David Jackson	Adam Targum	October 29, 2010	10.44
147	7	"Hide Sight"	Alex Zakrzewski	Bill Haynes	November 5, 2010	10.58
148	8	"Scared Stiff"	Marshall Adams	Kim Clements	November 12, 2010	10.02
149	9	"Justified"	Jeff T. Thomas	John Dove	November 19, 2010	10.18
150	10	"Shop Till You Drop"	Skipp Sudduth	Teleplay by : Trey Callaway & Aaron Rahsaan Thomas; Story by : Adam Targum & Christopher Silber	December 3, 2010	10.13
151	11	"To What End?"	Eric Laneuville	Pam Veasey & Zachary Reiter	January 7, 2011	9.45
152	12	"Holding Cell"	Scott White	Bill Haynes	January 14, 2011	9.56
153	13	"Party Down"	Skip Sudduth	Adam Targum	February 4, 2011	9.32
154	14	"Smooth Criminal"	Scott White	Aaron Rahsaan Thomas	February 11, 2011	9.71
155	15	"Vigilante"	Frederick E. O. Toye	Christopher Silber	February 18, 2011	10.65
156	16	"The Untouchable"	Vikki Williams	Kim Clements	February 25, 2011	10.89
157	17	"Do or Die"	Matt Earl Beesley	Matthew Levine	March 11, 2011	10.60
158	18	"Identity Crisis"	Mike Vejar Jr.	Pam Veasey	April 1, 2011	10.36
159	19	"Food for Thought"	Oz Scott	Trey Callaway	April 8, 2011	9.75
160	20	"Nothing for Something"	Eric Laneuville	John Dove	April 29, 2011	9.19
161	21	"Life Sentence"	Jeffrey Hunt	Christopher Silber & Adam Targum	May 6, 2011	9.53
162	22	"Exit Strategy"	Allison Liddi-Brown	Zachary Reiter & Bill Haynes	May 13, 2011	10.44

=== Season 8 (2011–12) ===
No. overall	No. in season	Title	Directed by	Written by	Original release date	US viewers (millions)
163	1	"Indelible"	Frederick E. O. Toye	Zachary Reiter & John Dove	September 23, 2011	10.68
164	2	"Keep It Real"	Alex Zakrzewski	Bill Haynes	September 30, 2011	10.07
165	3	"Cavallino Rampante"	Nathan Hope	Adam Targum	October 7, 2011	9.87
166	4	"Officer Involved"	Skipp Sudduth	Christopher Silber	October 14, 2011	10.13
167	5	"Air Apparent"	Anthony Hemingway	Aaron Rahsaan Thomas	October 21, 2011	10.73
168	6	"Get Me Out of Here!"	Scott White	Trey Callaway	November 4, 2011	9.83
169	7	"Crushed"	Duane Clark	Kim Clements	November 11, 2011	10.14
170	8	"Crossroads"	Jeff T. Thomas	John Dove	November 18, 2011	9.97
171	9	"Means to an End"	Marshall Adams	Zachary Reiter & Christopher Silber	December 2, 2011	9.76
172	10	"Clean Sweep"	David Von Ancken	Adam Targum	January 6, 2012	10.56
173	11	"Who's There?"	Vikki Williams	Bill Haynes	January 13, 2012	10.60
174	12	"Brooklyn 'Til I Die"	Eric Laneuville	Aaron Rahsaan Thomas	February 3, 2012	10.25
175	13	"The Ripple Effect"	Oz Scott	Trey Callaway	February 10, 2012	10.44
176	14	"Flash Pop"	Jerry Levine	Pam Veasey	March 30, 2012	9.45
177	15	"Kill Screen"	Allison Liddi-Brown	Tim Dragga & Adam Scott Weissman	April 6, 2012	9.07
178	16	"Sláinte"	Christine Moore	Sarah Byrd	April 27, 2012	9.13
179	17	"Unwrapped"	Deran Sarafian	John Dove & Christopher Silber	May 4, 2012	9.06
180	18	"Near Death"	Alex Zakrzewski	Zachary Reiter & Pam Veasey	May 11, 2012	9.11

=== Season 9 (2012–13) ===
No. overall	No. in season	Title	Directed by	Written by	Original release date	US viewers (millions)
181	1	"Reignited"	Jeff T. Thomas	Zachary Reiter & John Dove	September 28, 2012	9.11
182	2	"Where There's Smoke..."	Skipp Sudduth	Adam Targum & Sarah Byrd	October 5, 2012	8.40
183	3	"2,918 Miles"	Vikki Williams	Trey Callaway	October 12, 2012	9.48
184	4	"Unspoken"	Duane Clark	Pam Veasey	October 19, 2012	9.48
185	5	"Misconceptions"	Nathan Hope	John Dove	October 26, 2012	10.09
186	6	"The Lady in the Lake"	Scott White	David Hoselton	November 2, 2012	10.05
187	7	"Clue: SI"	Oz Scott	Steven Lilien & Bryan Wynbrandt	November 9, 2012	9.72
188	8	"Late Admissions"	Rob Bailey	Zachary Reiter	November 16, 2012	9.59
189	9	"Blood Out"	Sam Hill	Adam Targum	November 30, 2012	9.86
190	10	"The Real McCoy"	Matt Earl Beesley	Sarah Byrd	December 7, 2012	9.95
191	11	"Command+P"	Howard Deutch	Trey Callaway	January 4, 2013	9.13
192	12	"Civilized Lies"	Jerry Levine	John Dove	January 11, 2013	10.71
193	13	"Nine Thirteen"	Pam Veasey	Story by : David Fallon & Pam Veasey; Teleplay by : Pam Veasey	January 18, 2013	10.68
194	14	"White Gold"	Alex Zakrzewski	David Hoselton	February 1, 2013	10.39
195	15	"Seth and Apep"	Eric Laneuville	Steven Lilien & Bryan Wynbrandt	February 8, 2013	9.57
196	16	"Blood Actually"	Christine Moore	Adam Targum	February 15, 2013	8.59
197	17	"Today Is Life"	Allison Liddi-Brown	Zachary Reiter & John Dove	February 22, 2013	9.46

== Ratings ==
CSI: NY : U.S. viewers per episode (millions)

Season	Episode number																								
Season	1	2	3	4	5	6	7	8	9	10	11	12	13	14	15	16	17	18	19	20	21	22	23	24	25
1	19.26	19.47	16.89	12.98	14.71	15.38	17.46	13.50	14.92	15.60	12.15	13.66	17.56	13.08	14.04	14.31	13.62	16.73	11.00	14.84	13.42	14.55	12.30	–	
2	13.30	14.57	15.23	14.00	15.31	15.70	19.23	15.69	14.52	15.85	16.49	15.55	14.89	16.42	13.76	13.91	13.93	14.81	14.14	15.14	15.23	14.68	15.16	13.23	–
3	16.11	16.21	15.73	17.97	15.99	17.42	16.64	16.78	16.18	15.31	16.43	15.83	13.77	13.35	14.97	14.81	13.68	14.33	13.64	12.64	11.40	13.00	12.83	13.07	–
4	12.72	12.69	13.43	13.99	13.82	13.40	12.92	13.13	14.56	14.19	14.36	11.71	11.51	10.16	12.85	12.38	13.43	11.51	12.73	11.86	11.83	–			
5	14.59	14.88	15.87	14.39	13.75	11.80	11.62	14.12	12.30	13.33	13.38	12.67	11.58	11.94	12.33	12.56	13.63	12.79	12.64	12.50	12.14	12.50	13.40	12.33	12.77
6	15.06	13.16	12.43	13.40	13.01	12.00	14.51	13.62	12.68	12.97	13.55	14.03	13.54	14.16	12.98	12.35	11.07	10.64	10.85	10.30	11.36	11.30	11.96	–	
7	10.35	9.70	9.89	9.57	10.25	10.44	10.58	10.02	10.18	10.13	9.45	9.56	9.32	9.71	10.65	10.89	10.60	10.36	9.75	9.19	9.53	11.30	–		
8	10.68	10.07	9.87	10.13	10.73	9.83	10.14	9.97	9.76	10.56	10.60	10.25	10.44	9.45	9.07	9.13	9.06	9.11	–						
9	9.11	8.40	9.48	9.48	10.09	10.05	9.72	9.59	9.86	9.95	9.13	10.71	10.68	10.39	9.57	8.59	9.46	–							

Audience measurement performed by Nielsen Media Research

== Home video releases ==
Season	Episodes	DVD release dates			
Season	Episodes	Region 1	Region 2	Region 4	Discs
Pilot	1	January 4, 2005	February 20, 2006	February 7, 2007	7
1	23	October 18, 2005	March 1, 2010	February 13, 2007	7
2	24	October 17, 2006	March 1, 2010	February 7, 2007	6
3	24	October 9, 2007	March 1, 2010	March 4, 2009	6
4	21	September 23, 2008	March 1, 2010	October 19, 2009	6
5	25	September 29, 2009	March 1, 2010	January 11, 2012	7
6	23	October 26, 2010	September 20, 2010	October 24, 2012	7
7	22	September 27, 2011	January 9, 2012	March 13, 2013	6
8	18	September 25, 2012	June 24, 2013	October 8, 2014	5
9	17	June 25, 2013	May 12, 2014	April 15, 2015	5
Total	197	May 18, 2021	August 4, 2014	TBA	52

Note: In region 1 the pilot episode, "MIA/NYC NonStop", is included in the CSI: NY season 1 DVD set and all crossover episodes from seasons 6 and 9 are included in their seasons. Season 2's CSI: Miami crossover ("Felony Flight") is not included in its DVD set.

== See also ==
- CSI (franchise)
- List of CSI: Crime Scene Investigation episodes
- List of CSI: Miami episodes
- List of CSI: Cyber episodes
