= List of CSI: Cyber episodes =

CSI: Cyber (Crime Scene Investigation: Cyber) is an American police procedural drama television series that premiered on March 4, 2015, on CBS. The series, starring Patricia Arquette and Ted Danson, is the third spin-off of CSI: Crime Scene Investigation and the fourth series in the CSI franchise. On May 12, 2016, CBS cancelled the series after two seasons.

== Series overview ==
Season	Episodes	Originally released		Rank	Viewers (in millions)
Season	Episodes	First released	Last released	Rank	Viewers (in millions)
Introduction	2	April 30, 2014	November 16, 2014	—N/a	—N/a
1	13	March 4, 2015	May 13, 2015	39	10.77
2	18	October 4, 2015	March 13, 2016	50	8.50

== Episodes ==
=== Introductory episodes ===
Introductory episodes (CSI: Crime Scene Investigation season 14)
CSI No.	Title	Directed by	Written by	Original release date	Prod. code	US viewers (millions)
316	"Kitty"	Eagle Egilsson & Maruf Hasan Bappi	Ann Donahue & Carol Mendelsohn & Anthony E. Zuiker	April 30, 2014	14021	9.95
Dr. Avery Ryan, an FBI Special Agent in Charge from FBI Headquarters, Washington, joins D. B. Russell and Julie Finlay's team when the murder of a casino owner's wife is linked to a target who works on the dark net to exploit wealthy businessmen.
323	"The Twin Paradox"	Phil Conserva	Christopher Barbour	November 16, 2014	15006	8.45
As Las Vegas CSI track the elusive Gig Harbor Murderer, D.B. Russell turns to his friend Avery Ryan for advice on the psychology of a serial killer.

=== Season 1 (2015) ===
The first season of CSI: Cyber is headlined by Patricia Arquette, as Special Agent Avery Ryan. James Van Der Beek, Peter MacNicol, Shad Moss, Charley Koontz, and Hayley Kiyoko also star.

No. overall	No. in season	Title	Directed by	Written by	Original release date	Prod. code	US viewers (millions)
1	1	"Kidnapping 2.0"	Eagle Egilsson	Carol Mendelsohn & Ann Donahue & Anthony E. Zuiker	March 4, 2015	01001	10.46
2	2	"CMND:\Crash"	Jeff Thomas	Pam Veasey & Craig O'Neill	March 11, 2015	01002	9.71
3	3	"Killer En Route"	Richard J. Lewis	Story by : Matt Whitney & Michael Brandon Guercio; Teleplay by : Kate Sargeant Curtis & Thomas Hoppe	March 18, 2015	01008	7.96
4	4	"Fire Code"	Howard Deutch	Matt Whitney	March 25, 2015	01006	8.16
5	5	"Crowd Sourced"	Eriq La Salle	Craig O'Neill	April 8, 2015	01010	8.25
6	6	"The Evil Twin"	Rob Bailey	Pam Veasey	April 15, 2015	01011	8.12
7	7	"URL, Interrupted"	Kate Dennis	Kate Sargeant Curtis	April 21, 2015	01005	8.42
8	8	"Selfie 2.0"	Eagle Egilsson	Anthony E. Zuiker	April 22, 2015	01009	8.27
9	9	"L0m1s"	Nathan Hope	Michael Brandon Guercio	April 29, 2015	01004	7.23
10	10	"Click Your Poison"	Dermott Downs	Denise Hahn	May 6, 2015	01003	7.33
11	11	"Ghost in the Machine"	Alex Zakrzewski	Richard Catalani & Carly Soteras	May 12, 2015	01012	8.66
12	12	"Bit by Bit"	Aaron Lipstadt	Thomas Hoppe	May 13, 2015	01007	6.68
13	13	"Family Secrets"	Anton Cropper	Craig O'Neill & Pam Veasey & Matt Whitney	May 13, 2015	01013	6.68

=== Season 2 (2015–16) ===
The second season of CSI: Cyber is headlined by Patricia Arquette, as Deputy Director Avery Ryan, and Ted Danson as Director D.B. Russell. James Van Der Beek, Shad Moss, Charley Koontz, and Hayley Kiyoko also star.

No. overall	No. in season	Title	Directed by	Written by	Original release date	Prod. code	US viewers (millions)
14	1	"Why-Fi"	Alec Smight	Pam Veasey	October 4, 2015	CYB201	6.79
15	2	"Heart Me"	Matt Earl Beesley	Kate Sargeant Curtis	October 11, 2015	CYB202	6.20
16	3	"Brown Eyes, Blue Eyes"	Alec Smight	Devon Greggory	October 18, 2015	CYB203	5.21
17	4	"Red Crone"	Brad Tanenbaum	Denise Hahn	October 25, 2015	CYB204	6.54
18	5	"Hack E.R."	Eriq La Salle	Michael Brandon Guercio	November 1, 2015	CYB205	5.44
19	6	"Gone in 6 Seconds"	Allan Arkush	Matt Whitney	November 8, 2015	CYB207	5.65
20	7	"Corrupted Memory"	Jerry Levine	Story by : Andrew Karlsruher; Teleplay by : Craig O'Neill & Pam Veasey	November 15, 2015	CYB206	5.75
21	8	"Python"	Janice Cooke	Craig O'Neill	November 22, 2015	CYB208	6.30
22	9	"iWitness"	Paul Holahan	Carly Soteras	December 13, 2015	CYB209	5.93
23	10	"Shades of Grey"	Louis Shaw Milito	Kate Sargeant Curtis & Michael Brandon Guercio	December 20, 2015	CYB210	6.18
24	11	"404: Flight Not Found"	Skipp Sudduth	Thomas Hoppe	January 10, 2016	CYB211	6.49
25	12	"Going Viral"	Maja Vrvilo	Story by : Pam Veasey; Teleplay by : Denise Hahn & Pam Veasey	January 31, 2016	CYB212	6.82
26	13	"The Walking Dead"	Frederick E.O. Toye	Andrew Karlsruher & Scotty McKnight & Craig O'Neill	February 14, 2016	CYB214	6.31
27	14	"Fit-and-Run"	Jeff Thomas	Story by : Andrew Karlsruher & Scotty McKnight; Teleplay by : Devon Greggory & Michael Brandon Guercio	February 21, 2016	CYB213	6.69
28	15	"Python's Revenge"	Vikki Williams	Devon Greggory	March 2, 2016	CYB215	6.61
29	16	"5 Deadly Sins"	Rob Bailey	Matt Whitney	March 6, 2016	CYB216	5.72
30	17	"Flash Squad"	Howard Deutch	Scotty McKnight	March 9, 2016	CYB217	5.94
31	18	"Legacy"	Eriq La Salle	Pam Veasey	March 13, 2016	CYB218	6.32

== Ratings ==
CSI: Cyber : U.S. viewers per episode (millions)

Season	Episode number																	
Season	1	2	3	4	5	6	7	8	9	10	11	12	13	14	15	16	17	18
1	10.46	9.71	7.96	8.16	8.25	8.12	8.42	8.27	7.23	7.33	8.66	6.68	6.68	–				
2	6.79	6.20	5.21	6.54	5.44	5.65	5.75	6.30	5.93	6.18	6.49	6.82	6.31	6.69	6.61	5.72	5.94	6.32

Audience measurement performed by Nielsen Media Research

== See also ==
- CSI (franchise)
- List of CSI: Crime Scene Investigation episodes
- List of CSI: Miami episodes
- List of CSI: NY episodes
