= CSI: Cyber season 1 =

Season of American television series

CSI: Cyber
- Season 1
- Season 1 U.S. DVD cover
- Starring: Patricia Arquette; James Van Der Beek; Peter MacNicol; Shad Moss; Charley Koontz; Hayley Kiyoko
- No. of episodes: 13

Release
- Original network: CBS
- Original release: March 4 – May 13, 2015

Season chronology
- Next → Season 2

The first season of CSI: Cyber premiered on CBS on March 4, 2015, and concluded on May 13, 2015. The season, starring Patricia Arquette, aired in multiple time slots, but its regular time slot was Wednesdays at 10:00 pm (ET).

== Plot ==
"My name is Avery Ryan. I was a victim of cyber crime. Like you, I posted on social media, checked my bank account online and even kept confidential files of my psychological practice on my computer. Then I was hacked. And as a result one of my patients was murdered. My investigation into her death led me to the FBI where I joined a team of cyber experts who wage a war against a new breed of criminal hiding on the deep web. Infiltrating our daily lives in ways we never imagined. Faceless, nameless, lurking inside our devices. Just a keystroke away. It can happen to you." - Avery Ryan (episodes 2-13)

The first season of Cyber follows the work of Mary Aiken inspired Special Agent in Charge Avery Ryan (Patricia Arquette), who leads an FBI division tasked with working on the dark web, investigating everything from online baby auctions ("Kidnapping 2.0"), to the disabling of roller-coaster safeguards ("CMND:\CRASH"), the world of black market weaponry ("Ghost in the Machine"), the death of those using a transport app ("Killer En Route"), and a design flaw in a printer ("Fire Code"). Focusing on the psychological aspects of computer forensics, Ryan uses her experience as a Ph.D. to get inside the mind of the subjects she pursues, battling bombings ("Crowd Sourced"), electronic crime scene tampering ("The Evil Twin"), cyber-bullying ("URL Interrupted"), pop-ups ("Click Your Poison"), planes ("L0m1s"), and bit coins ("Bit by Bit"), all with the knowledge that her own past threatens to put her, and her colleagues, at risk ("Selfie 2.0", "Family Secrets"). Ryan and her team, Elijah Mundo (James Van Der Beek), Daniel Krumitz (Charley Koontz), Raven Ramirez (Hayley Kiyoko), and Brody Nelson (Shad Moss), work under the watchful eye of Assistant Deputy Director Simon Sifter (Peter MacNicol), a shrewd career agent who built his career investigating gang violence and gun crime.

There is generally a jargon of the cyber world, with its explanation, that shows as subtitles right after the title of the series displays in each episode, except for the first episode of Season 1. It reveals that the story in the episode will be relative to this jargon.

== Production ==
On February 18, 2014, CBS announced plans to launch a new spin-off of the franchise titled CSI: Cyber. CBS announced that it officially picked up the series on May 10, 2014. On March 5, 2014, Patricia Arquette was cast as Special Agent Avery Ryan. Charlie Koontz was the next actor to be cast, playing a character then named Daniel Krumitz Peter MacNicol joined the cast on August 1, 2014, as Sifter, Van Der Beek was later cast as the male lead, in the role of Elijah Mundo. Shad Moss announced his casting on August 20, 2014, via his Instagram account. Kiyoko was cast on October 29, 2014. Peter MacNicol departed the main cast at the end of this season, The first season, of thirteen episodes, premiered in March 2015. The series is executive produced by creators Carol Mendelsohn, Anthony E. Zuiker, and Ann Donahue, former CSI: NY executive producer Pam Veasey (who acts as showrunner), Jonathan Littman, and Jerry Bruckheimer. Mary Aiken, on whom the show is based, is attached as a series producer.

== Cast and characters ==
=== Main ===
- Patricia Arquette as Avery Ryan, Ph.D.; a Special Agent in Charge and the head of the FBI's Cyber Crime Division
- James Van Der Beek as Elijah Mundo; a Senior FBI Field Agent
- Peter MacNicol as Simon Sifter; an FBI Assistant Director
- Shad Moss as Brody Nelson; a former black-hat hacker turned analyst
- Charley Koontz as Daniel Krumitz; an FBI Special Agent and technical whiz
- Hayley Kiyoko as Raven Ramirez; a Social Media Trends expert

=== Recurring ===
- Michael Irby as David Ortega, M.D.; a Navy Captain and a Medical Examiner
- Jason George as Colin Vickner; the newly appointed Deputy Director of the FBI
- Angela Trimbur as Francine Krumitz; Daniel's sister
- Alexie Gilmore as Devon Atwood; Elijah's wife

=== Guest appearances ===
- Susan May Pratt as Fran Reynolds
- Kenneth Mitchell as Steve Reynolds
- Mckenna Grace as Michelle Mundo
- Aaron Abrams as Patrick Murphy
- Andrew Lawrence as Tobin
- Justin Breuning as Evan Wescott
- Nathan Gamble as Aaron Sifter
- Brandon Ford Green as Felix Garcia
- Rachel G. Fox as Elizabeth Marks
- Rosanna Arquette as Trish McCarthy
- Kristin Carey as Carla Finnis
- Colby French as Robert Hart
- Frank Kreuger as James Schaeffer
- Eric Normington as Russ Williams
- Austin Highsmith as Rene Bennett
- Brent Sexton as Andrew Michaels
- Deron Paul as Taylor Pettis
- David Dastmalchian as Logan Reeves
- James Sayess as Saudi Bidder

== Episodes ==
| No. overall | No. in season | Title | Directed by | Written by | Original release date | Prod. code | US viewers (millions) |
|---|---|---|---|---|---|---|---|
| 1 | 1 | "Kidnapping 2.0" | Eagle Egilsson | Carol Mendelsohn & Ann Donahue & Anthony E. Zuiker | March 4, 2015 | 01001 | 10.46 |
Ryan investigates when a series of hacked baby monitors contribute to the kidnapping of a child, while the team find themselves entering the world of illegal auctions in an attempt to shut down a wider conspiracy. Brody joins the team. Series debut of: Patricia Arquette as Avery Ryan (on CSI: Cyber). First appearances of: James Van Der Beek as Elijah Mundo, Peter MacNicol as Simon Sifter, Charley Koontz as Daniel Krumitz, Shad Moss as Brody Nelson, Hayley Kiyoko as Raven Ramirez.
| 2 | 2 | "CMND:\Crash" | Jeff Thomas | Pam Veasey & Craig O'Neill | March 11, 2015 | 01002 | 9.71 |
Ryan investigates a multiple fatality roller-coaster crash when a computer is hacked and its safeguards are disengaged, meanwhile Brody continues to struggle to separate his old life from his new, while Elijah is finding it difficult to live without his daughter full-time.: Opening credits jargon: Black hat hacker - Anyone who illegally breaches a device with malicious intent.
| 3 | 3 | "Killer En Route" | Richard J. Lewis | Story by : Matt Whitney & Michael Brandon Guercio; Teleplay by : Kate Sargeant Curtis & Thomas Hoppe | March 18, 2015 | 01008 | 7.96 |
Ryan investigates when a serial killer begins choosing his victims from the clients-list of an Uber-like vehicle for hire company. Daniel and his sister must deal with the possibility that the man who murdered their parents might be paroled.: Opening credits jargon: Phishing - Sending fraudulent e-mails to infect devices and steal information.
| 4 | 4 | "Fire Code" | Howard Deutch | Matt Whitney | March 25, 2015 | 01006 | 8.16 |
Ryan is called in when a new code takes advantage of a popular printer's design flaw to allow cyber-arsonists to set fires remotely, while Brody confronts a figure from his past, and Elijah learns his ex-wife wants to move to San Diego and take their daughter with her.: Opening credits jargon: Zero-day - A flaw in software on our personal devices that is unknown and can be hacked.
| 5 | 5 | "Crowd Sourced" | Eriq La Salle | Craig O'Neill | April 8, 2015 | 01010 | 8.25 |
Ryan investigates when a series of bombings are linked to a hacker obsessed with exposing the truth about technology, while viewers of a viral video are implicated in the attacks.: Opening credits jargon: Crowdsourcing - Connecting a group of personal devices to perform a specific task.
| 6 | 6 | "The Evil Twin" | Rob Bailey | Pam Veasey | April 15, 2015 | 01011 | 8.12 |
Ryan investigates the murder of a woman whose electronic devices indicate that she was alive for three days after her official time of death.: Opening credits jargon: Hospitality hack - Hacking a hotel's computer network to prey on employees and guests.
| 7 | 7 | "URL, Interrupted" | Kate Dennis | Kate Sargeant Curtis | April 21, 2015 | 01005 | 8.42 |
Ryan investigates when a cyberbullying victim pledges to exact revenge on her tormentors, while Raven sheds light on her life before joining the FBI, and Simon's son is implicated in a crime.: Opening credits jargon: Spoofing - A device or program is manipulated to masquerade as another.
| 8 | 8 | "Selfie 2.0" | Eagle Egilsson | Anthony E. Zuiker | April 22, 2015 | 01009 | 8.27 |
Ryan investigates the abductions of young women, whose social media pages continue to be updated. Avery also helps Trish McCarthy (Rosanna Arquette) cope with the death of her sister, Ryan's former psych patient.: Opening credits jargon: Location services - Software on your smart device that constantly tracks your precise location.
| 9 | 9 | "L0m1s" | Nathan Hope | Michael Brandon Guercio | April 29, 2015 | 01004 | 7.23 |
Ryan investigates when nine planes that departed from the same Miami airport face a coordinated Wi-Fi attack while in flight. Krumitz becomes obsessed with finding the hacker.: Opening credits jargon: Juice jacking - Invasion of your personal device while you're simply charging your battery.
| 10 | 10 | "Click Your Poison" | Dermott Downs | Denise Hahn | May 6, 2015 | 01003 | 7.33 |
Ryan and her team investigate when a man dies after taking medication he purchased from a hacked ad on a medical web site, while Sifter confronts an old friend about his lapse cyber security protocol.: Opening credits jargon: Malvertisement - An infected online ad that redirects an unsuspecting user to a malicious site.
| 11 | 11 | "Ghost in the Machine" | Alex Zakrzewski | Richard Catalani & Carly Soteras | May 12, 2015 | 01012 | 8.66 |
Ryan investigates when a killer begins to hack into popular online games in order to convince vulnerable teenagers to deliver dark-web purchased weaponry, while the team find themselves racing the clock to stop another child from dying.: Opening credits jargon: Game transfer phenomena - When gamers believe they can mimic the physical abilities of their on-line avatar in the real world.
| 12 | 12 | "Bit by Bit" | Aaron Lipstadt | Thomas Hoppe | May 13, 2015 | 01007 | 6.68 |
Ryan investigates when a power outage in Detroit is used to mask a family-run jewelry store robbery-homicide, in which it was bitcoins, not jewels, that were the target.: Opening credits jargon: Botnet - When hackers secretly control numerous individual's computers to conduct illegal activities.
| 13 | 13 | "Family Secrets" | Anton Cropper | Craig O'Neill & Pam Veasey & Matt Whitney | May 13, 2015 | 01013 | 6.68 |
Ryan identifies and confronts the hacker who released her patients' information when she worked as a psychologist in New York, while Brody reveals he has been investigating a man stalking Avery, and Krumitz confronts the man who murdered his parents. Later, when Ryan is kidnapped, she must fight to survive while the team track her location, and Sifter is notified when the body of the man who killed Krumitz's parents is found in an alleyway. Final appearance of: Peter MacNicol as Simon Sifter.: Opening credits jargon: Remote access trojan (RAT) - Malicious code that allows a hacker to infect and control any phone, tablet, or computer.

== Ratings ==
| No. in series | No. in season | Episode | Air date | Time slot (EST) | Live 18–49 rating | Live viewers (millions) | 18–49 rating increase | Viewers increase (millions) | Total 18–49 | Total viewers (millions) | Ref |
|---|---|---|---|---|---|---|---|---|---|---|---|
| 1 | 1 | "Kidnapping 2.0" | March 4, 2015 | Wednesday; 10:00 p.m. | 1.8/6 | 10.46 | 1.0 | 3.97 | 2.8 | 14.43 | |
| 2 | 2 | "CMND:\Crash" | March 11, 2015 | Wednesday; 10:00 p.m. | 1.7/6 | 9.71 | 1.0 | 3.26 | 2.7 | 13.01 | |
| 3 | 3 | "Killer En Route" | March 18, 2015 | Wednesday; 10:00 p.m. | 1.4/5 | 7.96 | 0.8 | 3.26 | 2.2 | 11.22 | |
| 4 | 4 | "Fire Code" | March 25, 2015 | Wednesday; 10:00 p.m. | 1.4/5 | 8.16 | 0.9 | 3.29 | 2.3 | 11.45 | |
| 5 | 5 | "Crowd Sourced" | April 8, 2015 | Wednesday; 10:00 p.m. | 1.5/5 | 8.25 | 0.8 | 3.00 | 2.2 | 11.15 | |
| 6 | 6 | "The Evil Twin" | April 15, 2015 | Wednesday; 10:00 p.m. | 1.5/5 | 8.12 | 0.8 | 3.33 | 2.3 | 11.45 | |
| 7 | 7 | "URL, Interrupted" | April 21, 2015 | Tuesday; 10:00 p.m. | 1.2/4 | 8.42 | 0.7 | 2.63 | 1.9 | 11.05 | |
| 8 | 8 | "Selfie 2.0" | April 22, 2015 | Wednesday; 10:00 p.m. | 1.5/5 | 8.27 | 0.6 | 2.60 | 2.1 | 10.86 | |
| 9 | 9 | "L0m1s" | April 29, 2015 | Wednesday; 10:00 p.m. | 1.2/4 | 7.23 | 0.7 | 2.92 | 1.9 | 10.15 | |
| 10 | 10 | "Click Your Poison" | May 6, 2015 | Wednesday; 10:00 p.m. | 1.2/4 | 7.33 | 0.7 | 2.82 | 1.9 | 10.12 | |
| 11 | 11 | "Ghost in the Machine" | May 12, 2015 | Tuesday; 10:00 p.m. | 1.2/4 | 8.66 | 0.7 | 2.65 | 1.9 | 11.30 | |
| 12 | 12 | "Bit by Bit" | May 13, 2015 | Wednesday; 9:00 p.m. | 1.2/4 | 6.68 | 0.7 | 2.23 | 1.9 | 9.20 | |
| 13 | 13 | "Family Secrets" | May 13, 2015 | Wednesday; 10:00 p.m. | 1.2/4 | 6.68 | 0.6 | 2.30 | 1.8 | 8.98 | |
