= CSI: Cyber season 2 =

Second season of American television series CSI: Cyber (2015–2016)

CSI: Cyber
- Season 2
- Season 2 U.S. DVD cover
- Starring: Patricia Arquette; James Van Der Beek; Shad Moss; Charley Koontz; Hayley Kiyoko; Ted Danson
- No. of episodes: 18

Release
- Original network: CBS
- Original release: October 4, 2015 – March 13, 2016

Season chronology
- ← Previous; Season 1

The second and final season of CSI: Cyber premiered on October 4, 2015. The series stars Patricia Arquette, James Van Der Beek, Shad Moss, Charley Koontz, Hayley Kiyoko, and Ted Danson.

== Plot ==
"My name is Avery Ryan. I'm a cyber psychologist and special agent for the FBI. I lead a team of cyber experts and former blackhats, waging a war against a new breed of criminal. Online predators hiding in the deep web. Faceless, nameless. Hackers intruding into our digital lives. Lurking inside our devices, just a keystroke away." - Avery Ryan (episode 1)

The second season of Cyber follows the work Avery Ryan (Patricia Arquette), as she and the team welcome D.B. Russell (Ted Danson), a Las Vegas veteran Crime Scene Investigator recruited by Ryan to direct the FBI's Next Generation Cyber Forensics Division. Still grieving the loss of his best friend ("Hack ER"), and following a recent divorce, Russell decides to take on new challenges. Studying how crimes play out in the real world, he combines old school forensics with new school tech, providing a foil for Ryan who, this season, faces the prospect of losing her own ex-husband ("The Walking Dead"). Before being faced with the collapse of the federal government ("Legacy"), Ryan and Russell investigate a murder recorded on motion sensors ("Why-Fi"), a riot in a small town ("Blue Eyes, Brown Eyes"), questionable social media activity ("5 Deadly Sins"), child abduction ("Red Crone"), the death of a jogger ("Fit-and-Run"), a murder on webcam ("Corrupted Memory"), a series of bizarre banking hacks ("Shades of Grey"), and a death linked to an online forum ("iWitness"), all while entering the worlds of street racing ("Gone in 6 Seconds") and online dating ("Heart Me"). Later, Daniel Krumitz (Charley Koontz) and Brody Nelson (Shad Moss) meet a celebrity during an investigation into airline hacking ("404: Flight Not Found"), the team aid the NYPD when cell-phone hacking causes a citywide incident ("Going Viral"), Russell connects with a Private Investigator ("Flash Squad"), and Ryan's first case as FBI Deputy Director pits her against Python ("Python"), who infiltrates the FBI and puts the team, also including Raven Ramirez (Hayley Kiyoko) and Elijah Mundo (James Van Der Beek), at risk ("Python's Revenge").

== Production ==
CBS announced on May 11, 2015, that CSI: Cyber was renewed for a second season. The season premiered in October 2015, while the series continues to be executive produced by creators Carol Mendelsohn, Anthony E. Zuiker, and Ann Donahue, former CSI: NY executive producer Pam Veasey (who acts as showrunner), Jonathan Littman, and Jerry Bruckheimer. Mary Aiken, on whom the show is based, remains attached as a series producer. The season was originally supposed to have 22 episodes, but this was later reduced to 18. Following the cancellation of CSI: Crime Scene Investigation it was also announced that Ted Danson would be joining the cast of "CSI: Cyber" as D.B. Russell, the newly appointed Director of Next Generation Cyber Forensics. Danson later announced his intent to depart the CSI franchise at the end of Cyber's second season, while Arquette simultaneously signed on for four film projects. On May 12, 2016, CBS canceled the series.

== Cast and characters ==
=== Main cast ===
- Patricia Arquette as Avery Ryan, Ph.D. Avery was a Special Agent in Charge attached to Cyber, though she is later promoted to Deputy Director of the Federal Bureau of Investigation. She also heads a hack-for-good program.
- Ted Danson as D.B. Russell, the Director of Next Generation Cyber Forensics, and a close friend of Avery's. He was recruited following a stint as the Director of the Las Vegas Crime Lab.
- James Van Der Beek as Elijah Mundo, a senior FBI field agent assigned to Ryan's team.
- Shad Moss as Brody Nelson, a black-hat hacker hired as part of hack-for-good. After his conviction is overturned, he undergoes training and becomes an agent.
- Charley Koontz as Daniel Krumitz, a white-hat hacker, and an FBI agent.
- Hayley Kiyoko as Raven Ramirez, a black-hat hacker serving out her prison sentence on Avery's team. She is later awarded time-served, and re-hired as a consultant.

=== Recurring ===
- Kelly Preston as Greer Latimore; a Private Investigator, and a love interest of D.B. Russell.
- Sean Blakemore as Marcus Silver; the Director of the Federal Bureau of Investigation.
- Alisha Boe as Grace Clarke, a friend of Avery's late-daughter.
- Marcus Giamatti as Artie Sneed; a freelance consultant contracted to Cyber.
- Mckenna Grace as Michelle Mundo; Elijah Mundo's daughter.
- Alexie Gilmore as Devon Atwood; Elijah's wife.
- Brent Sexton as Andrew Michaels; Avery Ryan's ex-husband.
- Gregg Henry as Calvin Mundo; Elijah's father.
- Evan Jones as Dante Wilkerson, "Python", a cyber criminal.

=== Guest appearances ===
- Haley Pullos as Samantha Arias
- Angela Trimbur as Francine Krumitz; Daniel Krumitz' sister.
- Kelly Osbourne as Stella Kane, "Reaper", a cyber criminal.
- Elisabeth Shue as Julie Finlay, Russell's deceased best-friend (archive footage)
- Amanda Payton as Nicole Gaines

== Episodes ==
No. overall	No. in season	Title	Directed by	Written by	Original release date	Prod. code	US viewers (millions)
14	1	"Why-Fi"	Alec Smight	Pam Veasey	October 4, 2015	CYB201	6.79
Ryan and Russell investigate a murder caught on motion-detection cameras. Meanwhile, following the departure of Simon Sifter (Peter MacNicol), Avery must decide whether to accept an offer to be the FBI's newest Deputy Director, and new arrival D.B. Russell gets up to speed on the latest tech, including remote controlled cockroaches and tablet drones. Ramirez and Nelson begin a relationship, Mundo learns his father has cancer, and Krumitz attends court as his sister is tried for murder. Series debut of: Ted Danson as D.B. Russell (on CSI: Cyber).: Opening Credits Jargon: War Driving - Hijacking connections to wireless networks broadcast in residential or commercial areas.
15	2	"Heart Me"	Matt Earl Beesley	Kate Sargeant Curtis	October 11, 2015	CYB202	6.20
Ryan and Russell investigate when nude photos are uploaded to a website without the subjects permission, while Raven's friend becomes the prime suspect in a murder when a man she met on a dating app is found dead. Ryan assigns Elijah to investigate, Nelson and Krumitz set Russell up with a dating profile, and D.B. invests in Bluetooth enabled pacifiers.: Opening Credits Jargon: Cyberstalking - The use of electronic devices to obsessively harass a victim.
16	3	"Brown Eyes, Blue Eyes"	Alec Smight	Devon Greggory	October 18, 2015	CYB203	5.21
Ryan and Russell are called to investigate when a video depicting the murder of a black man emerges online. As they uncover the secrets and lies within a local police department, racial tensions begin to rise. Meanwhile, Elijah's decision to use force during a confrontation is called into question and Nelson begins to feel discriminated against due to the color of his skin.: Opening Credits Jargon: Doxing - The act of releasing sensitive information online with harmful intent.
17	4	"Red Crone"	Brad Tanenbaum	Denise Hahn	October 25, 2015	CYB204	6.54
Ryan and Russell become aware of Nelson and Raven's relationship while Russell prepares for a date of his own. Meanwhile, Krumitz is approached to investigate when an app is used to lure children to the location of a mythological creation and Mundo becomes personally invested in the case, resulting in Ryan benching him from field work. Elijah later speaks to his father regarding his cancer diagnosis.: Opening Credits Jargon: Script Kiddie - An unskilled hacker who uses programs and exploits written by others.
18	5	"Hack E.R."	Eriq La Salle	Michael Brandon Guercio	November 1, 2015	CYB205	5.44
Ryan and Russell investigate when a hospital is hacked and the lives of patients are threatened. Elijah, still benched from field work, is forced to remain in Washington, much to his chagrin. Meanwhile, Russell contemplates the death of his best friend, Julie Finlay (Elisabeth Shue), and his reasons for leaving Las Vegas whilst Avery remembers her daughter when a friend from the past surfaces. Note: Elisabeth Shue appears in archive footage from CSI: Crime Scene Investigation's twelfth season episode "Seeing Red".: Opening Credits Jargon: Modchip - A computer chip that alters a device's software for deviant use.
19	6	"Gone in 6 Seconds"	Allan Arkush	Matt Whitney	November 8, 2015	CYB207	5.65
Ryan and Russell investigate a deadly road traffic collision involving a remotely controlled car and, while Russell is perplexed when he finds the springs are missing from his pens, Ryan leads her team to L.A. Meanwhile, Director Silver appoints Avery Deputy Director while allowing her to remain in the field and Krumitz finishes building a robot, explaining the missing springs. Note: Avery is promoted to Deputy Director of the FBI at the end of this episode.: Opening Credits Jargon: Car Hacking Tool (CHT) - A malicious device a hacker connects to a car's computer, allowing them to remotely control the car.
20	7	"Corrupted Memory"	Jerry Levine	Story by : Andrew Karlsruher; Teleplay by : Craig O'Neill & Pam Veasey	November 15, 2015	CYB206	5.75
Ryan and Russell are called to investigate when a woman is murdered while video-chatting her parents. As the investigation takes an unusual turn, the team study sex toys infected with malware, while Avery is tasked with interviewing and profiling an agoraphobic witness and Nelson's brother asks him for help. Note: This episode was broadcast outside of primetime, airing from 10:57 to 11:57.: Opening Credits Jargon: Malware - Software used to gather sensitive information or gain access to private computer systems.
21	8	"Python"	Janice Cooke	Craig O'Neill	November 22, 2015	CYB208	6.30
Ryan and Russell investigate when Python, the FBI's most-wanted cyber criminal, murders an Interpol Agent. Teaming up with an investigator from her past, Ryan risks her life during her first case as Deputy Director, while Russell reconstitutes etched-off serial numbers from guns in Python's past. By analyzing the psyche of the killer, and tracing his electronic footprint, the team uncovers Python's identity, but he still manages to infiltrate CTOC and compromise Cyber's security. Note: This is the first episode to feature Ryan in the role of Deputy Director of the FBI.: Opening Credits Jargon: Shelf Baby - A fake digital identity created and "raised" online by a hacker planning to use it to commit crimes.
22	9	"iWitness"	Paul Holahan	Carly Soteras	December 13, 2015	CYB209	5.93
While Russell testifies in Las Vegas, Ryan investigates the murder of a hacker linked to a confession website. As the team begins to piece together the secret life of the victim, they learn that the crime is directly linked to a campus rape. Ryan begins a battle to hold the college accountable, listing herself as the complainant in a Title IX suit while the team comes face to face with the FBI's legal counsel. Note: This episode was originally scheduled to air on November 29, 2015, but was preempted by football.: Opening Credits Jargon: Brute-Force Attack - Attempting every possible password combination to crack into a protected device.
23	10	"Shades of Grey"	Louis Shaw Milito	Kate Sargeant Curtis & Michael Brandon Guercio	December 20, 2015	CYB210	6.18
Ryan and Russell investigate when the shooting of a man outside CTOC leads to a series of bizarre cyber hacks targeting banks within the District. Meanwhile, Raven prepares to depart the FBI, but not before Ryan meets with her parole board and makes a decision that leads to her confiding in Russell.: Opening Credits Jargon: Whaling Attack - An email scam that targets a high-level executive in order to gain access to his company's network.
24	11	"404: Flight Not Found"	Skipp Sudduth	Thomas Hoppe	January 10, 2016	CYB211	6.49
With Russell out of town, Ryan investigates the cyber hijacking of a plane when its flight signal is duplicated fifty times on Air Traffic Control servers. While Avery and Director Silver issue press releases, the team works to find the hijacker. Meanwhile, Krumitz and Nelson meet Emmitt Smith on the streets of Washington.: Opening Credits Jargon: Software-Defined Radio - Used to imitate radio frequencies in order to infiltrate secure networks.
25	12	"Going Viral"	Maja Vrvilo	Story by : Pam Veasey; Teleplay by : Denise Hahn & Pam Veasey	January 31, 2016	CYB212	6.82
Ryan and Russell investigate when interference affects New York 911 calls. The Cyber team discovers an airborne computer virus that is infecting cell phones and must find the hacker responsible. Meanwhile, D.B. meets a woman after responding to a text he received by mistake.: Opening Credits Jargon: Default Password - A simple password assigned by a device manufacturer that is easily hacked if left unchanged.
26	13	"The Walking Dead"	Frederick E.O. Toye	Andrew Karlsruher & Scotty McKnight & Craig O'Neill	February 14, 2016	CYB214	6.31
Ryan and Russell investigate when a digital assassin for hire begins filing the death certificates of those who are still alive by a teenage girl named Samantha Arias, including Avery's ex-husband, Andrew. Meanwhile, Ryan confides in Russell about her relationship with Andrew, while Krumitz comes face-to-face with an old nemesis.: Opening Credits Jargon: Social Engineering - Manipulating computer users to reveal sensitive information to use in a hack.
27	14	"Fit-and-Run"	Jeff Thomas	Story by : Andrew Karlsruher & Scotty McKnight; Teleplay by : Devon Greggory & Michael Brandon Guercio	February 21, 2016	CYB213	6.69
Ryan and Russell use a fitness wearable to retrace the steps of a murdered jogger, which leads to the Cyber team uncovering an amateur organ harvesting operation. Meanwhile, Avery learns of D.B.'s budding relationship with Greer, the woman he met in "Going Viral," and Ryan pranks Russell.: Opening Credits Jargon: Near Field Communication (NFC) - A short-range wireless technology used to share data between two devices.
28	15	"Python's Revenge"	Vikki Williams	Devon Greggory	March 2, 2016	CYB215	6.61
Ryan and Russell are tasked with hunting down Python, Cyber's most notorious criminal, after they uncover a severed head in the Deputy Director's apartment. Python returns to kidnap Avery's surrogate daughter, Grace, making the team decipher a series of elaborate code-like puzzles in an attempt to save her life. Meanwhile, Russell helps Avery move and Ryan reconnects with her daughter's nanny before facing down Python one last time.: Opening Credits Jargon: Shodan Map - An interactive search engine that shows the location of every device directly connected to the internet.
29	16	"5 Deadly Sins"	Rob Bailey	Matt Whitney	March 6, 2016	CYB216	5.72
Ryan and Russell track down a rogue employee of a social media site who is killing posters engaging in one of the site's "5 Deadly Sins" (Hate Speech, Porn, Violence, Drugs, & Trolling). The final "poster" killed (for "Violence") is none other than the employee herself committing suicide.: Opening Credits Jargon: QR (Quick Response) Code - A pattern of black and white squares that can be scanned by the camera on a smartphone to download information.
30	17	"Flash Squad"	Howard Deutch	Scotty McKnight	March 9, 2016	CYB217	5.94
Ryan and Russell investigate when a Los Angeles-based hacker infiltrates a crowd-sourced satellite navigation app, while Nelson continues to investigate his own case. Meanwhile, Russell reconnects with Greer Latimore, Nelson decides to sue the FBI after he finds a legal loophole in his Stock Market hack case, and FBI Director Silver terminates Avery's hacker-for-hire program, leaving Raven's future at Cyber uncertain. Also, Director Silver expunges Nelson's FBI record and Greer asks D.B. to go to Paris with her.: Opening Credits Jargon: SuperCookie - Code that secretly tracks a person's internet activity.
31	18	"Legacy"	Eriq La Salle	Pam Veasey	March 13, 2016	CYB218	6.32
In the series finale Ryan and Russell's search for the hacker responsible for the largest breach of highly classified data in history leads them to a thirteen year old white-hat, while Raven prepares for her court hearing to determine her sentencing. Meanwhile, Ryan faces off with the Directors of the CIA, NSA, and FBI, Russell considers his future with Greer, Krumitz saves a child's life, and Elijah has a heart-to-heart with his father. Also, Ryan successfully re-establishes a romantic relationship with her ex-husband and Russell resigns from the FBI. As D.B. leaves the building, he saves Elijah from being killed by his stalker but is shot. The screen fades to black with the team towering over D.B. trying to stop the bleeding. Four months later: Ryan reminisces on her time with D.B. following the shooting, Nelson returns to Cyber as a Special Agent after a stint at Quantico, and Raven - whose sentence has been commuted - is employed by Ryan as a consultant. Krumitz leads a tour of young hackers as part of Ryan's newly-established youth-hacker program, while the team notes a desire for D.B. to see them where they are now. Meanwhile, in Paris, D.B. is shown to have survived his injuries and joins Greer to discuss their future, while struggling to learn French. Final appearances of: Patricia Arquette as Dr Avery Ryan, Ted Danson as D.B. Russell, James Van Der Beek as Elijah Mundo, Shad Moss as Brody Nelson, Charley Koontz as Daniel Krumitz, Hayley Kiyoko as Raven Ramirez. This is the series finale of CSI Cyber.: Opening Credits Jargon: Legacy Footprints - A digital data trail you unintentionally leave online.
