= MIA/NYC NonStop =

- CSI: Miami episode
- Episode no.: Season 2 Episode 23
- Directed by: Danny Cannon
- Written by: Ann Donahue, Carol Mendelsohn, & Anthony Zuiker
- Production code: 223
- Original air date: May 17, 2004

Guest appearances
- The cast of CSI: NY: Gary Sinise as Detective Mac Taylor; Melina Kanakaredes as Detective Stella Bonasera; Carmine Giovinazzo as Detective Danny Messer; Vanessa Ferlito as Detective Aiden Burn; Hill Harper as Medical Examiner Sheldon Hawkes

Episode chronology
← Previous "Rap Sheet"	Next → "Innocent"

"MIA/NYC NonStop" is the twenty-third episode in the second season of the American crime drama CSI: Miami and also served as backdoor pilot for the spin-off CSI: NY. The episode aired on May 17, 2004, on CBS.

== Plot ==
After sixteen-year-old Laura Spellman finds the brutally slain bodies of her parents, Horatio Caine vows to personally track down the killer and let Laura know she is safe. A scrap of paper with the lettering from a car rental company leads the CSIs to an important clue: the killer flew in from New York. Determined to keep his promise to Laura, Horatio boards a plane to New York, on the tail of Nick Murdoch, whom he believes is the killer.

Meanwhile, in New York, NYPD CSI Mac Taylor is called to the scene of a murder of an undercover officer identified as Nick Murdoch who has been strangled. Horatio arrives in New York and the two CSIs realize that the murderer had stolen Murdoch's identity. Mac agrees to hand over jurisdiction to MDPD. Their investigations lead them to one of New York's richest families, the Hanovers. Michael Hanover, Sr. was murdered while his son survived the attack. The two teams must now find the link between the murders of two unrelated families and bring the perpetrator to justice before he strikes again.
