= Level 26 =

Novel series by Anthony E. Zuiker and Duane Swierczynski

Level 26 is a digital horror novel series by Anthony E. Zuiker and Duane Swierczynski. The novels include online content, with video elements and an interactive web community; readers were encouraged to visit Level26.com to see this content.

== List of novels ==
- Level 26: Dark Origins
- Level 26: Dark Prophecy
- Level 26: Dark Revelations

== Plots ==
=== Level 26: Dark Origins ===
Law enforcement personnel quantify evil and murderousness on a scale of 1 to 25, with naive opportunists at Level 1 and organized, premeditated torture-murderers at Level 25. An elite investigative unit, headed by reluctant operative Steve Dark, must track down the killer who is forming a new category.

=== Level 26: Dark Prophecy ===
As a result of the events in the previous book, Steve Dark has crossed the line and considers himself no longer bound by the law in his pursuit of "level 26" killers.

=== Level 26: Dark Revelations ===
Steve Dark faces a killer named Labyrinth, who uses riddles, puzzles, and wordplay to announce his targets ahead of time.
