= CSI: Cyber =

American police procedural television drama thriller series (2015–2016)

- Genre: Police procedural; Drama
- Created by: Anthony E. Zuiker; Carol Mendelsohn; Ann Donahue
- Starring: Patricia Arquette; James Van Der Beek; Peter MacNicol; Shad Moss; Charley Koontz; Hayley Kiyoko; Ted Danson
- Opening theme: "I Can See for Miles" by The Who
- Country of origin: United States
- Original language: English
- No. of seasons: 2
- No. of episodes: 31 (list of episodes)

Production
- Executive producers: Pam Veasey (showrunner); Anthony E. Zuiker; Jerry Bruckheimer; Carol Mendelsohn; Ann Donahue; Jonathan Littman
- Producers: Mary Aiken; Mike Azzolino; Matt Whitney
- Running time: 41–45 minutes
- Production companies: Jerry Bruckheimer Television; Content Partners LLC; CBS Productions

Original release
- Network: CBS
- Release: March 4, 2015 – March 13, 2016

Related
- CSI: Crime Scene Investigation; CSI: Miami; CSI: NY; CSI: Vegas; Cold Case; Without a Trace

CSI: Cyber (Crime Scene Investigation: Cyber) is an American police procedural drama television series that premiered on March 4, 2015, on CBS. The series, starring Patricia Arquette and Ted Danson, is the third spin-off of CSI: Crime Scene Investigation and the fourth series in the CSI franchise. On May 12, 2016, CBS canceled the series after two seasons.

== Plot ==
The series follows an elite team of FBI Special Agents tasked with investigating cyber crimes in North America. Based out of Washington, D.C., the CTOC (Cyber Threat Operations Center) team is supervised by deputy director Avery Ryan, an esteemed Ph.D. Ryan is a behavioral psychologist turned "cyber shrink" who established the FBI Cyber Crime division and heads a "hack-for-good" program, a scheme in which the criminals she catches can work for her in lieu of receiving a prison sentence. Ryan works with D.B. Russell, a left-coast Sherlock Holmes and career Crime Scene Investigator who joins the team after a stint as Director of the Las Vegas Crime Lab. Together, Russell and Ryan head a team including Elijah Mundo, Daniel Krumitz (aka Krummy), Raven Ramirez, and Brody Nelson, who work to solve Internet-related murders, cyber theft, hacking, sexual offenses, blackmail, and any other crime deemed to be cyber-related within the FBI's jurisdiction.

== Cast and characters ==
=== Main ===
- Patricia Arquette as Dr. Avery Ryan, a deputy director of the FBI. Avery was a renowned psychologist in New York when her professional database was hacked, resulting in the death of a patient. This, coupled with the recent death of her daughter, led Avery to leave New York, and found the FBI's Cyber Crime Division. As Special Agent in Charge, Avery heads a team of former cyber criminals and federal agents who travel nationwide in search of the criminals who work on the dark net. After several years working under Simon Sifter, Ryan was promoted to deputy director of the FBI. Following the death of her daughter, Ryan divorced her husband, though the two later reconnect and begin a romantic relationship. Following the dissolution of her hack-for-good program, Avery begins recruiting young hackers to work within CTOC (Cyber Threat Operations Center).
- James Van Der Beek as Elijah Mundo, a Senior FBI Field Agent. Assigned to Ryan's Cyber division, Mundo is a former U.S. Marine, and an expert in battlefield forensics, weaponry, vehicles, and bombs. After a short separation from his wife, Elijah filed for divorce, though the two have since reconciled. He is an avid gamer, and because of this he is all too aware of the dangers that lurk on the internet. As a field agent, Mundo is much more hands on than his counterparts in detaining and interviewing suspects. During the second season, Mundo's father was diagnosed with cancer, causing him to confide in a barmaid who later begins stalking him. In "Legacy", she is shot and killed by Russell. Elijah has one daughter.
- Peter MacNicol as Simon Sifter (season 1), an FBI Assistant Deputy Director. Simon works out of the FBI Headquarters in Washington and oversees Ryan and her Cyber division. Working his way up through the ranks investigating homicides, drive-bys, and gang warfare, Sifter has built up an array of contacts and connections that are invaluable to the FBI. He often acts as the clearinghouse between FBI Cyber and its intergovernmental counterparts. He is married with at least one child. Sometime following the first season, Sifter vacated his position.
- Shad Moss as Brody Nelson, an FBI analyst. Brody is a former black hat hacker who was caught and later recruited by FBI Cyber as part of Ryan's "hack-for-good" program. After avoiding a prison sentence at the FBI's behest, the team are initially dubious of Brody's intentions. After struggling to sever his ties with the world of cyber crime, Nelson outs himself to the hacking community and proves himself to be a loyal and valued analyst. The team nicknamed him "Baby-Face". He is shown to be arachnophobic. During season two, Nelson discovers that the FBI obtained evidence against him illegally, and as such his conviction is overturned. He later undergoes training at Quantico, and returns to Cyber as an agent.
- Charley Koontz as Daniel Krumitz, a Special Agent. Daniel notes his desire to join law enforcement began when his parents were murdered. He is a skilled analyst (Avery claims he is the best white hat hacker in the world), and he is also brutally honest. He is a quick-witted introvert who specializes in technology, though he is also a trained field agent. He has one sister, named Francine, and has strong bonds with both Nelson and Ryan. Krumitz is often referred to by his nickname "Krummy".
- Hayley Kiyoko as Raven Ramirez, an FBI analyst. Raven, like Nelson, is a former black hat hacker recruited by Ryan as part of her "hack-for-good" program. At the start of the first season, she had been with the FBI for two years, and had become a specialist in social media investigations, international relations and cyber trends. Raven stated that, as a victim of cyber-bullying, she turned to hacking as a refuge from her tormentors. Raven is a trusted member of the team. Her hacker alias was Eclipse. After Avery's hack-for-good program is dissolved, Raven is awarded time-served, and thus spared prison. She later rejoins the FBI as a consultant specialist.
- Ted Danson as D.B. Russell (season 2), the Director of Next Generation Cyber Forensics. D.B. is described as a "left-coast Sherlock Holmes", the son of hippies and a keen forensic botanist. As a trained Crime Scene Investigator, Russell joins Cyber following a four-year stint as Director of the Las Vegas Crime Lab looking for a fresh start following a divorce and the death of his "soulmate" Julie Finlay. Avery jokes that she offered Russell a job because of his selection of tea leaves and often mocks his Zen characteristics. Russell has four children and one granddaughter and, since joining Cyber, has expressed an interest in dating. He has formed close bonds with Daniel Krumitz and Brody Nelson. Russell later begins a relationship with Greer Latimore, then tenders his resignation in order to move to Paris. During the series finale, he is shot, but recovers from his injuries.

=== Recurring ===
- Brent Sexton as Andrew Michaels, Avery's ex-husband. Andrew and she were married with a young daughter. Following the loss of their child, the two separated. In the season one finale, he notes that he has not seen Avery since she joined the FBI. During season two, he reconnects with Ryan after a hacker files a false death certificate in his name. Despite being engaged to another woman, he and Avery begin a romantic relationship once again.
- Kelly Preston as Greer Latimore, a former Secret Service agent turned private investigator. Greer first becomes known to the Cyber team after D.B. meets her in a bar. They later begin a romantic relationship and, after Greer is offered a job in Paris, D.B. tenders his resignation.
- Michael Irby as David Ortega, a U.S. Naval captain. David is a medical doctor stationed out of Washington, often seen assisting Avery Ryan's team's investigations. He is a trained medical examiner.
- Angela Trimbur as Francine Krumitz, Daniel's sister. Francine is hung up on the death of her parents. Although initially better at hiding it than her brother, she later shoots and kills their parents' murderer.
- Mckenna Grace as Michelle Mundo, Elijah's daughter. Referred to as "Mitchie" by her family, Michelle currently lives with her mother Devon, though she maintains a strong relationship with Elijah. She is initially the focus of a custody dispute.
- Alexie Gilmore as Devon Atwood, Elijah's wife. Devon and Elijah had, during the first season, recently separated. She is still very much in love with Elijah, as he is with her. The two decide to reconcile their romance, but keep it a secret from their daughter.
- Marcus Giamatti as Artie Sneed, a quirky amateur technology expert who occasionally helps the cyber unit with cases.
- Sean Blakemore as Director Marcus Silver, Avery's boss.
- Diogo Morgado as Miguel Vega: an Interpol agent, Avery's friend, who helped the team to stop Python.

== Episodes ==
Season	Episodes	Originally released		Rank	Viewers (in millions)
Season	Episodes	First released	Last released	Rank	Viewers (in millions)
Introduction	2	April 30, 2014	November 16, 2014	—N/a	—N/a
1	13	March 4, 2015	May 13, 2015	39	10.77
2	18	October 4, 2015	March 13, 2016	50	8.50

== Production ==
=== Development ===
On February 18, 2014, CBS announced plans to launch a new spin-off of the franchise titled CSI: Cyber. Deadline.com reported that the series would focus on cyber investigations, as opposed to the forensic investigations seen in CSI, CSI: Miami, and CSI: NY, stating that "[Anthony E.] Zuiker has been at the forefront of entertainment’s digital conversion, experimenting in the arena for the past decade." Zuiker, who wrote digi-novel Level 26, spent time in Washington meeting with the CIA, FBI, and DOD as part of his research for his 2009 CBS project Cyber Crimes (which was not picked up to series and likely inspired CSI: Cyber). It was announced that the series would be based on the work of producer Mary Aiken, a pioneering cyber psychologist. The pilot episode was penned by Zuiker, Carol Mendelsohn, and Ann Donahue, and aired on April 30, 2014. CBS announced that it had officially picked up the series on May 10, 2014. The first season, comprising 13 episodes, premiered in March 2015. The second and final season consisted of 18 episodes.

The series is executive produced by creators Carol Mendelsohn, Anthony E. Zuiker, and Ann Donahue, former CSI: NY executive producer Pam Veasey (who acts as showrunner), Jonathan Littman, and Jerry Bruckheimer. Mary Aiken, on whom the show is based, is attached as a series producer. Peter MacNicol departed the main cast at the end of the first season, whilst CBS announced on May 11, 2015, that CSI: Cyber was renewed for a second season. On June 25, 2015, Moss confirmed in an interview on The Project that season 2 would include 22 episodes. Season 2 was reduced from 22 to 18 episodes, ending with the episode titled "Legacy".

=== Casting ===
On March 5, 2014, Patricia Arquette was cast as Special Agent Avery Ryan in a Spring episode of CSI. Ryan was described as being "tasked with solving high octane crimes that start out in the cyber world and play out in real life". Charley Koontz was the next actor to be cast, playing a character then named Daniel Krummitz, an Agent that " rarely, if ever, goes home". Peter MacNicol joined the cast on August 1, 2014, as Assistant Director Stavros Sifter, "a shrewd and savvy networker; a charmer with a hint of malice". Koontz and MacNicol's characters were later renamed Daniel Krumitz and Simon Sifter, respectively. These announcements were swiftly followed by the casting of James Van Der Beek as the male lead, in the role of Elijah Mundo. Mundo was described as "an expert in battlefield forensics recruited by Patricia Arquette’s character". Shad Moss announced his casting on August 20, 2014, via his Instagram account. He was later confirmed to be playing "Baby Face" Nelson. Rounding out the original cast was Hayley Kiyoko as Raven Ramirez, described as a character who "will possess a dark secret in her front story which Ryan won’t even know until it’s too late". Kiyoko was cast on October 29, 2014.

Following the cancellation of CSI: Crime Scene Investigation, it was announced that Ted Danson would be joining the Cyber cast as D.B. Russell, the newly appointed Director of Next Generation Cyber Forensics.

=== Filming ===
CSI: Cyber's primary photography takes place at CBS' Studio Center in the Los Angeles, California neighborhood of Studio City. Numerous outdoor scenes are filmed locally in the Los Angeles area, including Matteo Street, Spring Street, Main Street, the Arroyo Seco, and the Colorado Street Bridge.

=== Music ===
The series' theme song is "I Can See for Miles" by The Who, and the series' music composers are Jeff Russo and Ben Decter. Songs featured throughout the first season include: "Thunderbolt" by Justin Prime and Sidney Samson (episode 2), "Take a Ride" by Rattle Box (episode 4), "Re-Creation" by Strikez (episode 5), "With Me" by Underglow (episode 6), "Five Foot Two, Eyes of Blue" by Art Landry and His Orchestra (episode 8), "Get Your Hands Up" by Uforik (episode 9), "Let Go for Tonight" by Foxes (episode 10), and "How Sweet It Is (To Be Loved by You)" by Marvin Gaye (episode 12). The second season features music by Underglow ("Save the Day", episode 1), With Lions ("Jitterbug", episode 2), Savoy ("Pump it Up", episode 3) and Motabeatz ("Watch Your Back", episode 5). The show also features additional music by electronic music producer Nick Chiari, who produces under the alias Grabbitz.

== Reception ==
=== Ratings ===
Viewership and ratings per season of CSI: Cyber
Season	Timeslot (ET)	Episodes	First aired		Last aired		TV season	Viewership rank	Avg. viewers (millions)
Season	Timeslot (ET)	Episodes	Date	Viewers (millions)	Date	Viewers (millions)	TV season	Viewership rank	Avg. viewers (millions)
1	Wednesday 10:00 pm	13	March 4, 2015	10.46	May 13, 2015	6.68	2014–15	39	10.51
2	Sunday 10:00 pm	18	October 4, 2015	6.79	March 13, 2016	6.32	2015–16	50	8.50

=== Critical response ===
The first season of CSI: Cyber received mixed reviews. On Rotten Tomatoes, the season has a rating of 34%, based on 32 reviews, with an average rating of 5.10/10. The site's critical consensus reads, "While stocked with impressive talent, CSI: Cyber fails to add anything truly new to the franchise, settling for a slightly modernized twist on the same typical crimefighting scenarios." On Metacritic, the season has a score of 45 out of 100, based on 23 critics, indicating "mixed or average reviews".

=== World record ===
Producers announced intentions to break the Guinness World Record for largest ever TV simulcast drama on March 4, 2015, with the episode "Kitty" airing in 150 countries in addition to digital streaming. They succeeded in breaking the record by airing CSI: Cyber's backdoor pilot in 171 countries. However, that record was broken again just 15 days later by the Game of Thrones episode "The House of Black and White".

== International broadcast ==
The series has been sold to Channel 5 in the United Kingdom, CTV in Canada, Rai 2 in Italy, Network Ten in Australia, Prime in New Zealand, RTÉ2 in Ireland, TF1 in France, AXN in Asia and Latin America, RTL 5 in The Netherlands, Nova in Bulgaria, Skai TV in Greece, HOT Zone in Israel, TV3 in Estonia, Kanal 5 in Sweden and Denmark, and MTV3 in Finland.

== Home video releases ==
Season	Episodes	DVD release dates				Special Features
Season	Episodes	Region 1	Region 2	Region 4	Discs	Special Features
1	13	September 15, 2015	June 27, 2016	May 18, 2016	4	CSI: Crime Scene Investigation Episode 1421: "Kitty"; It Can Happen To You: Season 1 of CSI: Cyber; Welcome to CTOC; Encoding CSI: Cyber; CGI-Cyber; Tech Tools of the Trade; Gag Reel: A Bug in the System; Deleted Scenes; Audio Commentary on Select Episodes; Launch Promos
2	18	September 6, 2016	April 3, 2017	March 22, 2017	5	Hack My Ride; Raising Kaine: Kelly Osbourne Visits CSI: Cyber; Behind the Firewall: Season 2 of CSI: Cyber; Mr. Russell Goes to Washington; Pixel Perfect; The Sounds of Cyber; Gag Reel; Deleted Scenes
