= Skipp Sudduth =

American actor

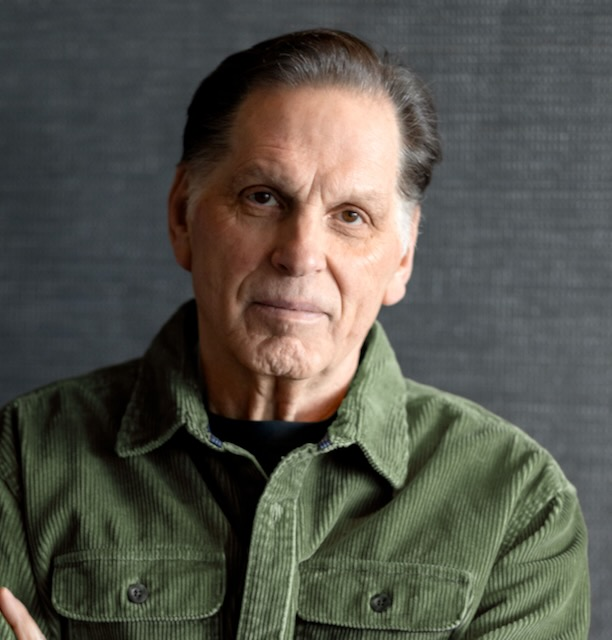
- Sudduth in 2025
- Born: Robert Lee Sudduth IV; August 23, 1956 (age 70); Wareham, Massachusetts, U.S.
- Education: Hampden-Sydney College (BS); University of Virginia (MFA)
- Years active: 1984–present
- Relatives: Kohl Sudduth (brother)

Robert Lee "Skipp" Sudduth IV (born August 23, 1956) is an American theater, film and television actor and director. He appeared in the 1998 film Ronin and the TV drama Third Watch.

== Early life and education ==
Born in Wareham, Massachusetts, the son of an engineer and a nurse, Sudduth attended George Washington High School in Danville, Virginia. He earned a Bachelor of Science degree in biology from Hampden–Sydney College. Sudduth received his Masters of Fine Arts degree in acting from the University of Virginia in 1985. He is the older brother of actor Kohl Sudduth.

== Career ==
Sudduth worked for a year as director of alumni relations at his alma mater in the administration of the college's president Josiah Bunting III, author of The Lionheads and future commandant of Virginia Military Institute in Lexington. Sudduth then worked for a year as apprentice to the winemaker with poet and vintner Tom O'Grady at Rose Bower Vineyard and Winery. During this period, Sudduth was acting in community and campus theater and writing original comedy and directing and producing the annual comedy review, Parting Shots, at Hampden–Sydney College.

The following year, Sudduth returned to school entering the acting program in the Department of Drama at the University of Virginia. At UVA, he met and worked with Spencer Golub, who would go on to head the Drama Department at Brown University. Golub's emphasis on physically liberating the imagination through extensive guided improvisation became the foundation for Sudduth's approach to acting. Sudduth acted extensively during his time at UVA playing leading roles in Anton Chekhov's The Cherry Orchard, Sam Shepard's Curse of the Starving Class (opposite Nip/Tuck's Dylan Walsh), and Peter Shaffer's Equus, which featured the first full male and female nudity ever allowed on stage in a production at UVA.

Sudduth moved to Chicago in December 1985 aspiring to work with the Steppenwolf Theatre Company. During his four and a half years in Chicago, Sudduth played in many stage productions including Samuel Beckett's Waiting for Godot, Emily Mann's Execution of Justice, and Nebraska (by screenwriter John Logan, who penned The Aviator). He has appeared in stage adaptations of The Grapes of Wrath, On the Waterfront and A Clockwork Orange, and acted in the 1999 Broadway production of The Iceman Cometh (alongside Kevin Spacey) and the 2003 debut performance of Woody Allen's play Riverside Drive (starring with Paul Reiser). He also appeared in Twelfth Night at Lincoln Center (with Helen Hunt).

Sudduth's movie career has seen him play numerous small parts in 54 (1998), A Cool, Dry Place (1998), and Spike Lee's Clockers (1995), as well larger roles with Robert De Niro in Ronin (1998) and Flawless (1999). Sudduth, who is a keen amateur racing/stunt driver, performed nearly all of the driving his character does in Ronin.

Skipp Sudduth had a recurring role in the TV soap opera One Life to Live, but is better known for his portrayal of NYPD officer John "Sully" Sullivan in the NBC drama Third Watch. Sudduth appeared in all six seasons of the show and his character is one of the leading ensemble of eight around whom the underlying story arc revolves. He earned his Directors Guild of America card directing the episode "Collateral Damage, Part II" in season four. Sudduth has also made guest appearances in Homicide: Life on the Street, Law & Order, Oz, Trinity, Cosby, and Mad About You.

Sudduth is also a singer-songwriter. His acoustic-rock band Minus Ted has released three albums: Hope and Damage (1994), Really Really (1999) and Hope and Damage Revisited (2005). The last two are available on iTunes. He was a member of New York's Rumble in the Redroom comedy troupe (1996–99) and has recorded several notable audio books including one short story in the acclaimed Stephen King collection, Just After Sunset and Peter Canellos's biography of Ted Kennedy, Last Lion: The Fall and Rise of Ted Kennedy, both for Simon & Schuster.

In 2008, Sudduth created the role of Captain George Brackett in the Tony Award-winning revival of Rodgers and Hammerstein's South Pacific at Lincoln Center. Sudduth finished the year appearing in the New York premiere of Prayer for My Enemy, a play by Craig Lucas. The play was the second time Sudduth worked with director Bartlett Sher who had also directed South Pacific. The production ran at the off-Broadway theater Playwright's Horizons from November 14 to December 21 and also featured Victoria Clark, Michele Pawk, and Jonathan Groff. In the play, Sudduth played a recovering alcoholic coping with his son's return from the Iraq War.

Sudduth officially began his career as a director during his years in the cast of Third Watch by directing one episode in each of the last three years of the series. Since then, Sudduth has directed episodes of ER, Criminal Minds, Women's Murder Club, CSI: Cyber, and multiple episodes of CSI: NY. In 2012, he starred on the short-lived police drama NYC 22 as NYPD Detective Tommy Luster.

== Filmography ==
=== Film ===
Year	Title	Role	Notes
1984	Mutants in Paradise	Boris / Bob	
1995	Clockers	Narc #3	
1995	Money Train	Kowalski	
1996	Eraser	Watch Commander	
1998	A Cool, Dry Place	Jack Newbauer	
1998	54	Harlan O'Shea	
1998	Ronin	Larry	
1998	American Cuisine	Wicks	
1998	Bury the Evidence	Goon #2	
1999	Flawless	Tommy	
2010	Drunkboat	Earl	
2013	The Hunted	Tony	
2015	Meadowland	Ted	
2015	Freeheld	Chief Reynolds	
2016	To Whom It May Concern	Peter	
2016	The Neighbor	Neil	
2018	Beyond the Night	Sheriff Hirsch	
2019	Blow the Man Down	Officer Coletti	
2020	Lazy Susan	Tom	

=== Television ===
Year	Title	Role	Notes
1992	The Secret	Jack (Voter)	Television film
1993	Daybreak	Workfare Man	Television film
1993	Scam	Bob Sarcominia	Television film
1993	As the World Turns	Doctor	Episode #1.9658
1994	CBS Schoolbreak Special	Barry Goldstein	Episode: "Same Difference"
1995	New York Undercover	Tony Donato	Episode: "Buster and Claudia"
1995	New York News	Lapetto	Episode: "Broadway Joe"
1995–1999	Law & Order	Various roles	3 episodes
1996	Swift Justice	Cantrell	Episode: "Out on a Limb"
1996	Kindred: The Embraced	Goth	Episode: "Bad Moon Rising"
1996	Central Park West	Nick	Episode: "You Belong to Me!"
1996	Viper	Terry Molloy	Episode: "Talk Is Cheap"
1996	Firehouse	Sy	Television film
1997	One Life to Live	Fritz Van Hinkle	Episode #1.7319
1997	George Wallace	Albert J. Lingo	Miniseries
1997	Brooklyn South	Officer Stan Pritchard	Episode: "Pilot"
1997–1998	Oz	Lenny Burrano	6 episodes
1998	Twelfth Night, or What You Will	Fabian	Television film
1998	Mad About You	Construction Worker #1	Episode: "Season Opener"
1998	Trinity	Terry	2 episodes
1999	Homicide: Life on the Street	Angelo Marcini	Episode: "Bones of Contention"
1999–2005	Third Watch	John Sullivan	131 episodes
2005	Law & Order: SVU	Phillip Westley	Episode: "Rockabye"
2006, 2013	Criminal Minds	Stan Gordinski	2 episodes
2008	Law & Order: Criminal Intent	Clete Dixon	Episode: "Neighborhood Watch"
2010	Live from Lincoln Center	Capt. George Brackett	Episode: "South Pacific"
2010–2014	The Good Wife	Jim Moody	10 episodes
2011	Curb Your Enthusiasm	Mister Softee Man	Episode: "Mister Softee"
2011	Person of Interest	Detective Byrne	Episode: "Blue Code"
2012	NYC 22	Det. Tommy Luster	3 episodes
2014	Orange Is the New Black	SIS Agent Spiner	Episode: "We Have Manners. We're Polite."
2014	Louie	Mr. Hoffman	2 episodes
2014	CSI: Crime Scene Investigation	Ed Lusk	Episode: "The Book of Shadows"
2014, 2016	Elementary	William Hull	2 episodes
2015	Ray Donovan	Governor Verona	3 episodes
2016	NCIS: New Orleans	Blake Jarrett	Episode: "Help Wanted"
2016	The Night Of	Cop at crime scene	Episode: "The Beach"
2016	Quarry	Lloyd	5 episodes
2017	Chicago P.D.	John Bukowski	Episode: "Promise"
2017–2019	Madam Secretary	Peter Harriman	6 episodes
2018	Escape at Dannemora	Steve Racette	2 episodes
