= Charley Koontz =

American film and television actor

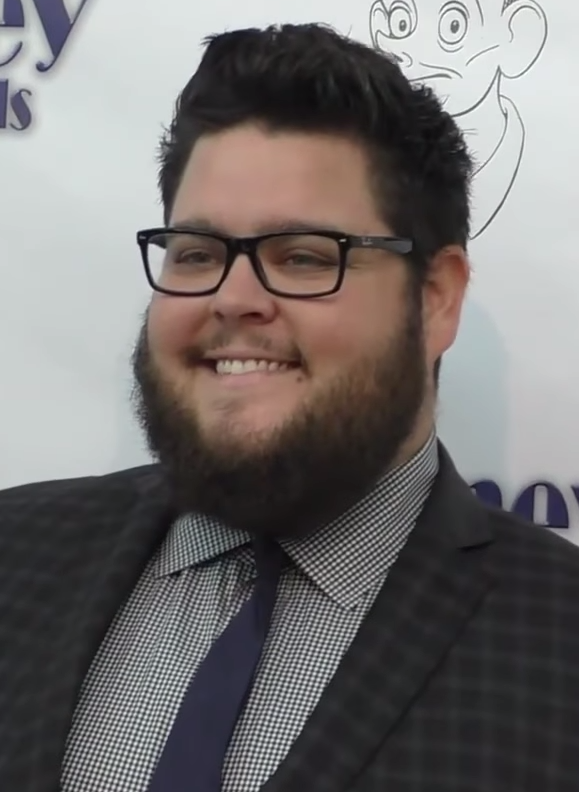
- Koontz at the Carney Awards in 2016
- Born: August 10, 1987 (age 39); Concord, California
- Education: Loyola Marymount University in Los Angeles (B.A., Theater Arts)
- Years active: 2009–present
- Partner: Emily Schalick (2013–present)
- Relatives: Katie (sister)

Charley Koontz (born August 10, 1987) is an American film and television actor. He is best known for his recurring role as the student nicknamed 'Fat' Neil on Community.

== Early life, family and education ==
Koontz was raised in the San Francisco Bay Area. He graduated from De La Salle High School in Concord, California, where he appeared in school plays.

He attended Loyola Marymount University in Los Angeles and earned a bachelor's degree in Theater Arts.

== Career ==
Koontz appeared as FBI Agent Daniel Krumitz in CSI: Cyber. The show premiered on CBS on March 4, 2015.

== Filmography ==
Film and television
Year	Film	Role	Notes
2009–2010	Free Rent	Chuck	5 episodes
2010	Rubber	Film Buff Charley	
2010–2011	Gigantic	Peter	
2011	Couples Therapy	Phil	
2011	Road to Juarez	Rob Hermann	
2011	Perfect Couples	Pizza Delivery Guy	Episode "Perfect Health"
2011	Workers' Comp	Lonny	TV movie
2011–2015	Community	'Fat' Neil	16 episodes
2012	Wrong	Colleague Richard	
2012	Awake	Tim Wax	Episode "Ricky's Tacos"
2012	Royal Pains	Owen	Episode "Off Season Greetings"
2013	Apparitional	Berger	
2013	Contracted	Zain	
2013	Modern Family	Santa	Episode "The Old Man & the Tree"
2013	Cleaners	Dude	Episode "The Afterparty"
2015–2016	CSI: Cyber	Agent Daniel Krumitz	Starring
2015	Clarence	Glary/Teen	Episode "Spooky Boo"
2015	Contracted: Phase II	Zain	
2017	Captain Black	Jake	
2017	This Is Us	Zeke	Episode "The 20's"
2020	The Boys	Tommy Peterson	Episode "Butcher, Baker, Candlestick Maker"
2020	Casting The Net	Anthony	2 episodes
2020	Hollywood Fringe	Barista	
2022	The Good Doctor	Phil Hall	Episode "Rebellion"
2022	Frank and Penelope	Cookie	
2022	NCIS: Hawaiʻi	Siggy Williams	Episode "Nurture"
2022	The Rookie: Feds	Logan Anders	Episode "Felicia"
2022	National Treasure: Edge of History	Shop Clerk	Episode "The Treasure Map"
2023	Eat Your Heart Out	Douglas	Short film
2023	Long December	Alan	
2023	Station 19	Chef Wolf	2 episodes
