= Ann Donahue =

TV writer

- Occupations: Screenwriting and television writer

Ann Donahue is a prominent television writer. She along with Carol Mendelsohn and Anthony E. Zuiker created the successful CSI franchise which includes CSI: Crime Scene Investigation, CSI: Miami, CSI: NY, and CSI: Cyber.

== Biography ==
Donahue's father was a pharmaceutical salesman, and she was raised in Cleveland and Cincinnati. She has five siblings. Writing for TV and film was an early ambition for her. After graduating from Loveland High School in Ohio, she attended Ohio State University but left to get married and move to Los Angeles. After moving, she was a legal assistant by day and wrote at night. Her work gained notice when her 1985 play, Home Fires, received the Los Angeles County Cultural Award after being produced locally. That recognition led to her being hired to write scripts for films and TV and to producing TV programs.

She served as the showrunner for CSI: Miami until May 2012 when CBS cancelled the show. New long-term contracts in the fall of 2003 made Donahue and Mendelsohn "the two highest-paid female writers in television drama."

Donahue's television credits include Emmy Award-winning scripts for the popular series Picket Fences.

Other television writing credits include China Beach, 21 Jump Street, Murder One, M.Y.O.B., High Incident, and Beverly Hills, 90210. Donahue modeled the set of M.Y.O.B. after her high school alma mater. She has also written and produced a number of off-Broadway plays.

Donahue is an out lesbian.
