= Underglow =

Type of vehicle lighting

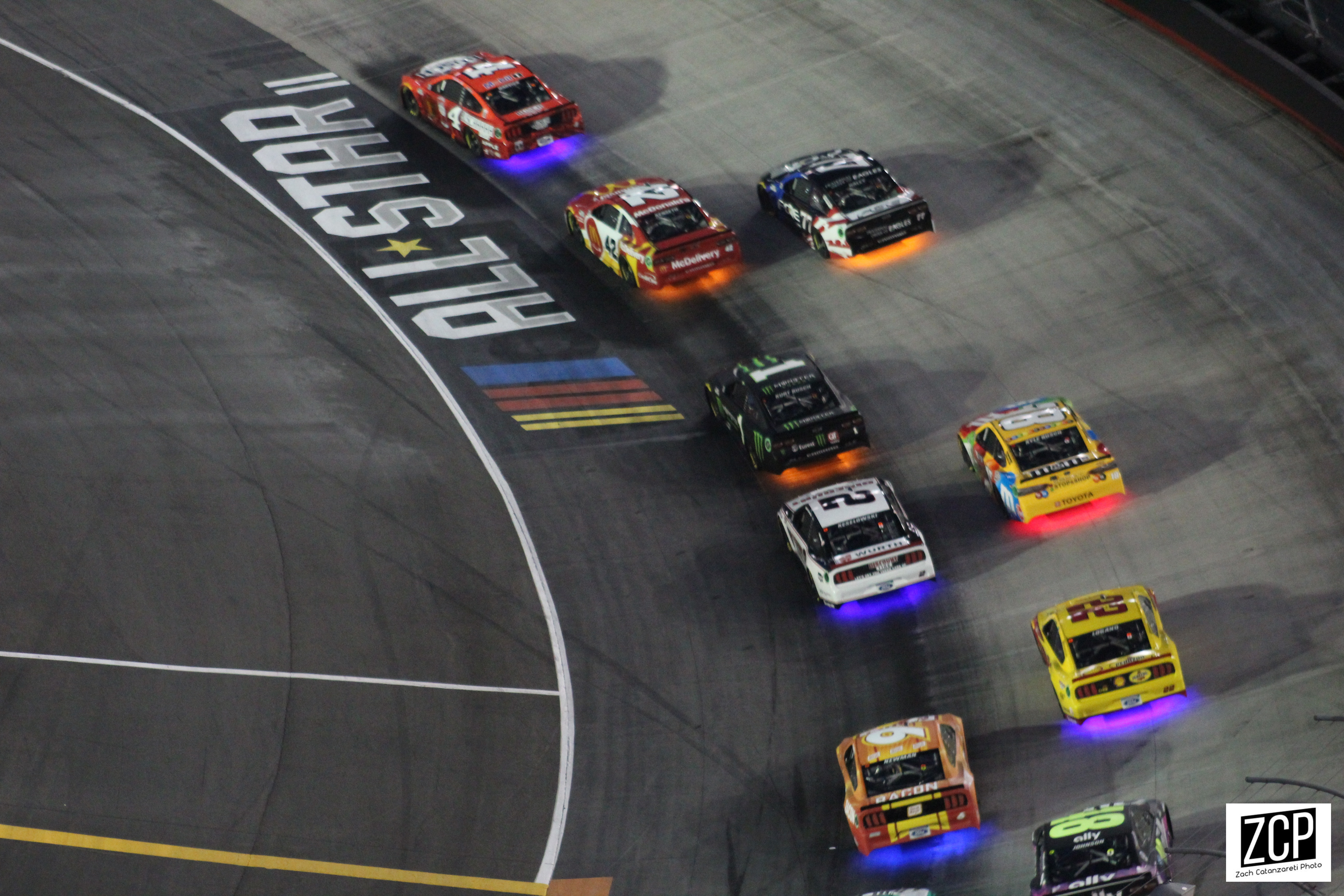
Underglow lights on racing cars.

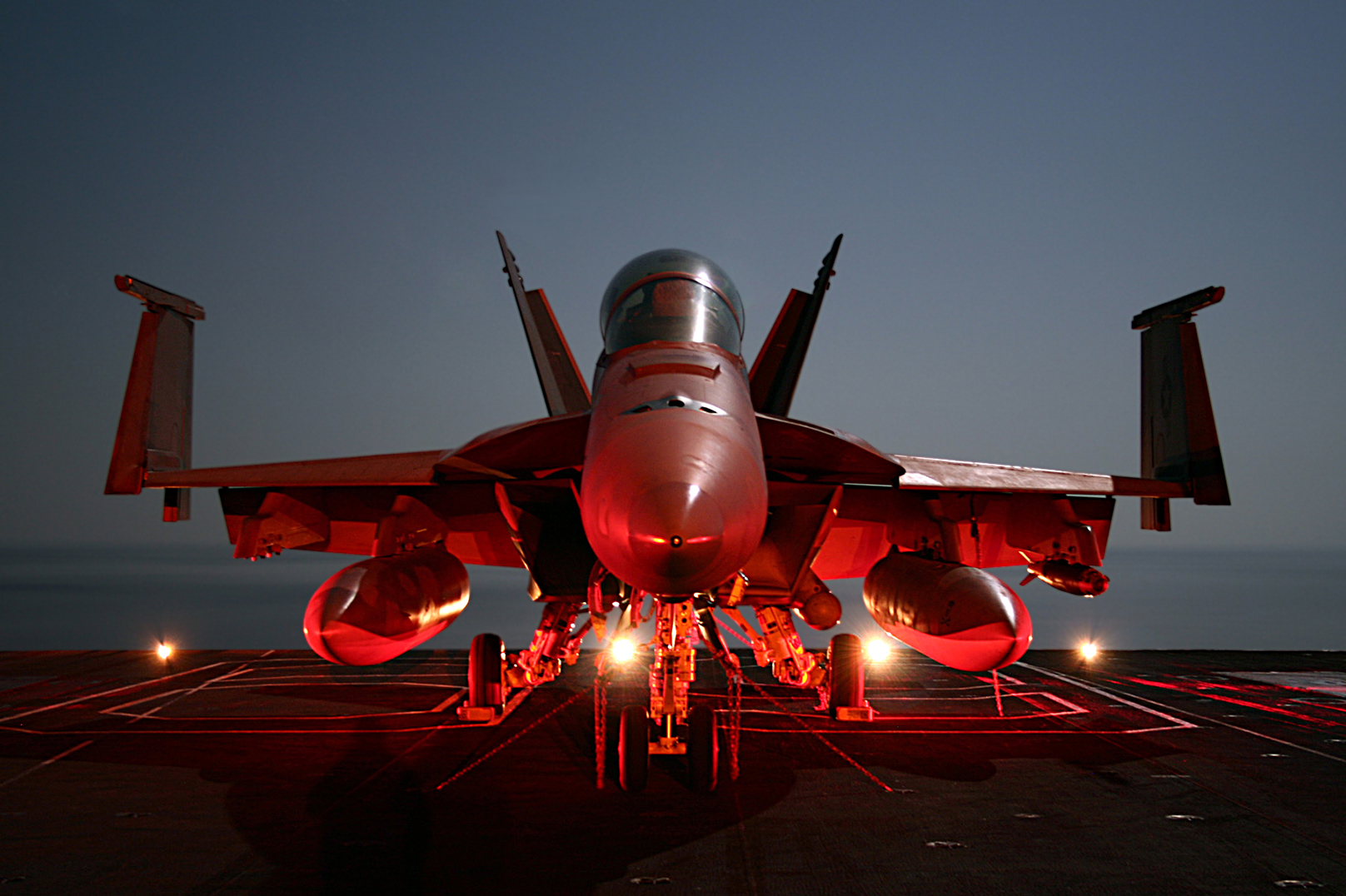
Underglow lights on an F/A-18 airplane.

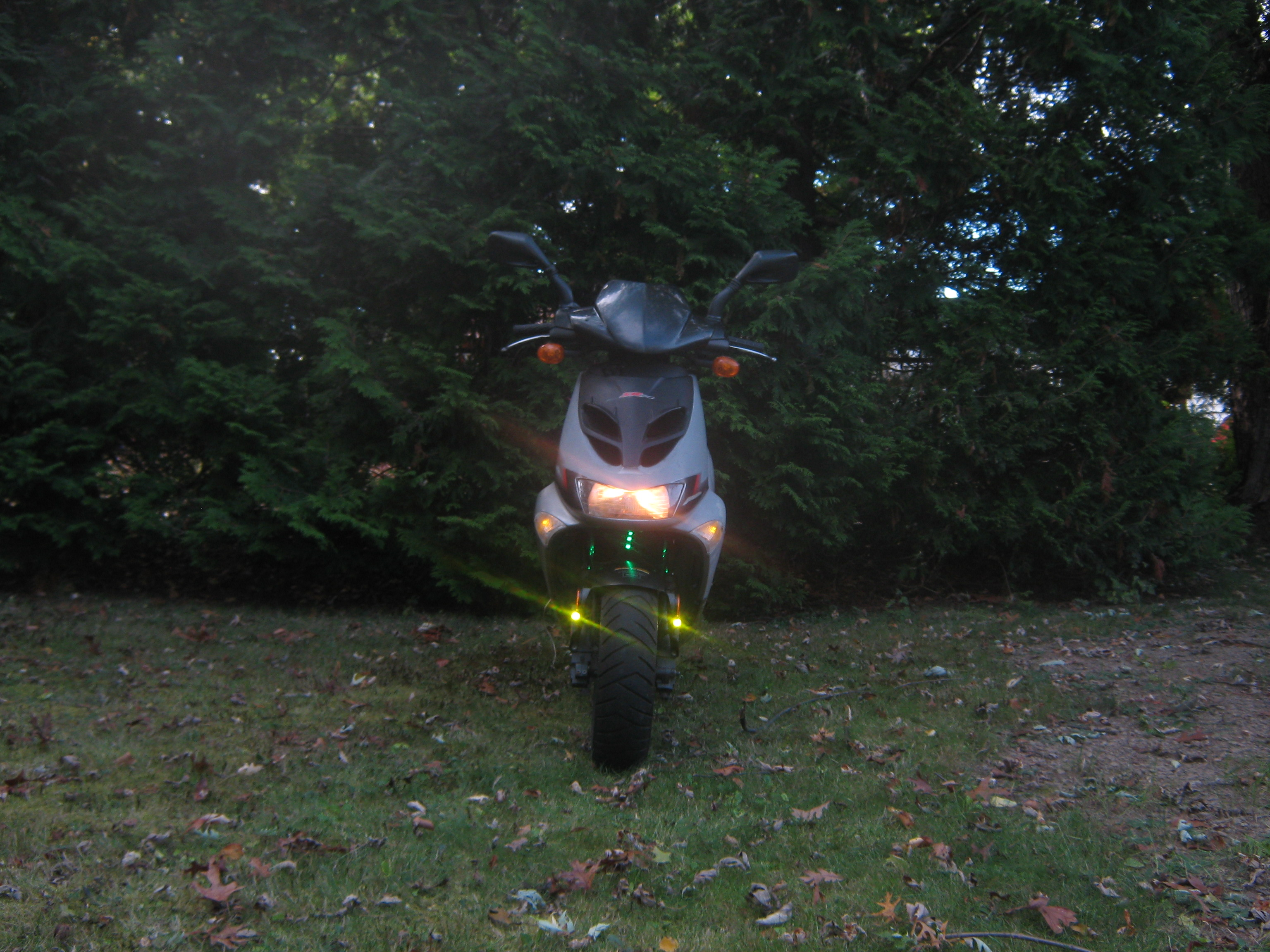
Green underglow lights on a scooter moped.

In the car industry, underglow or ground effects lighting refers to neon or LED aftermarket car customization in which lights are attached to the underside of the chassis so that they illuminate the ground underneath the car. Underglow has become popular in car shows to add aesthetic appeal to the cars. Some US states prohibit underglow on public roads, while other countries restrict their use.

Underglow was invented in 1987 by They (who changed their name from "Andrew Wilson" to the mononymous "They" in 2004), holder of 14 patents on ground effects lighting and other products.

== Types of underglow ==
=== Neon ===
Neon tubes are used for the underglow. Though neon gas only produces the color red, adding other elemental gases can produce up to 150 colors. Because neon tubes contain rarefied gas, they tend to break often while going over speed bumps.

=== LED ===
LEDs are light-emitting diodes which can be arranged in clusters. LEDs generally last longer than neon tubes, while LED strips are also considerably less fragile. They have multi-color capabilities and can have strobe effects.

There are 3 major styles of underglow LED lights: pod style LED lights, LED strips and flexible LED tubes. LED pods consist of a rigid housing containing several LED lights as well as a lens. LED strips are easy to install almost everywhere, including engine bays or air intake scoops. LED tubes produce steady light that resembles classic neon glow.

Recent LED developments have led to underglow that can respond to music, draw patterns and act as courtesy lights or brake lights. Sometimes this is done via Bluetooth and a smart phone or an RF remote.

== Legality ==
=== United States ===
In the United States of America, certain underglow lights are unlawful, however this is largely based on individual states and varies from state to state. Particularly the colors blue and red, as well as any kind of flashing light effects, are banned from public streets in some states because they can distract drivers or be confused with police cars. Almost all the states prohibit the colors green, red and blue because these are used for emergency purposes only. However, the laws governing the underglow of a car depend on the state. States where there is a lot of traffic and have a lot of cities have stricter regulations due to the high risk of crashes.

Ground effects lighting is unlawful in the state of Michigan, Massachusetts and Maine. In California, “diffused lights” are permitted to be mounted on the exterior of a vehicle (which includes underneath) if they meet the requirements set forth in Section 25400 of the California Vehicle Code. Furthermore, all diffused colors less than 0.05 candela per square inch are authorized, except that the color red is prohibited in the front. Finally, diffused lights cannot be mounted within 12 inches of a required device. (See section 25400 of the CA Veh. Code.) Underglow is legal in Ohio. In Vermont, there is a penalty if underglow is turned on while driving. In Alaska, underglow lights are allowed as long as the color is white, yellow, or amber. In Florida, underglow use is not unlawful, although several restrictions apply.

=== Canada ===
Underglow or ground effects lightings are unlawful in the province of Alberta. The use of these lightings are prohibited under section 4 subsection (4) of Alberta’s Vehicle Equipment Regulation.

In British Columbia underglow is considered to be “off road” lights and must be covered with an opaque cover anytime the vehicle is on a highway, parked or being driven on public roads.

=== United Kingdom ===
Underglow is allowed in the UK, but color and positioning restrictions apply.
