= Pam Veasey =

American television director

- Born: Pamela Renea Veasey; May 25, 1962 (age 64)
- Education: University of Southern California (B A.)
- Occupations: Television writer, producer and director
- Years active: 1985–present
- Known for: Showrunner of CSI: NY and CSI: Cyber
- Spouse: Marvin Williams
- Children: 2

Pamela Renea Veasey (born May 25, 1962) is an American television writer, producer, and director.

== Career ==
Veasey graduated from the University of Southern California with degrees in Journalism and Political Science. She began her writing career in 1985, writing an episode of What's Happening Now!! Before that she worked as receptionist behind-the-scenes of the sitcom Gimme a Break!, eventually writing six episodes for the series. In 1990, she became a writer on the sketch comedy series In Living Color, later became head writer, remaining with series until it ended in 1994.

In 1997, Veasey decided to transition to drama television, writing an episode Nash Bridges. During the same year, she served as an executive producer and consulting producer on the sitcoms Between Brothers and The Gregory Hines Show respectively. From 1999–2000, she produced the comedy-drama series Get Real starring Jesse Eisenberg and Anne Hathaway. From the late 1990s to present, Veasey has produced and written for the CBS drama series Martial Law, The District.

In 2004 Veasey became the showrunner of the CSI: Crime Scene Investigation spin off CSI: NY., a position she would remain in till the show was cancelled in 2013.

In 2011, Veasey became the executive producer of The CW drama Ringer starring Sarah Michelle Gellar, a position she held until the show was officially cancelled on May 11, 2012.

In 2014, Veasey took on the role of showrunner for the new CSI spinoff CSI: Cyber, the same role she held on CSI: NY. Cyber aired its first season of thirteen episodes in 2015, while CBS later renewed the series for twenty-two (later reduced to eighteen) second-season episodes, that aired from 2015-2016.

== Personal life ==
Veasey was married to Marvin Williams, an assistant football coach at Pomona College and her two sons Mason and Avery, are also athletes. Avery was drafted in the 5th round of the 2021 NFL Draft by the Atlanta Falcons. Veasey and Williams divorced in 2011.
