= Anthony E. Zuiker =

American screenwriter

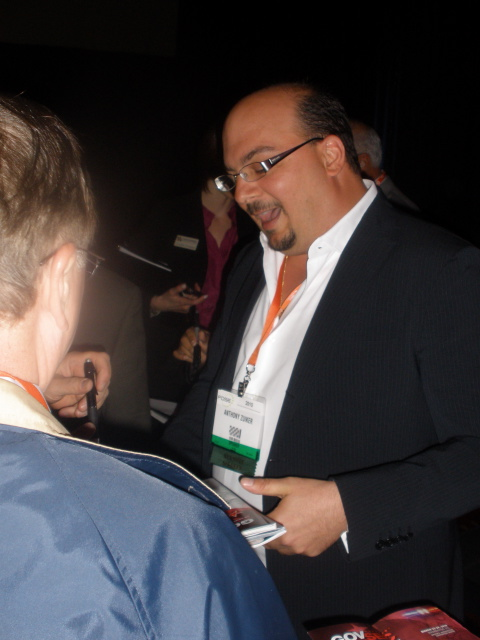
- Zuiker in 2021
- Born: August 17, 1968 (age 58); Blue Island, Illinois, United States
- Education: University of Nevada, Las Vegas (B.A.)
- Occupation: Producer
- Years active: 1988–present
- Spouses: Jennifer Zuiker (divorced) Michelle Territo (m. 2013)
- Children: 3

Anthony E. Zuiker (pronounced /ˈzaɪkər/; born August 17, 1968) is an American television writer, television producer, and author best known as the creator of CSI: Crime Scene Investigation. He produced all 5 editions of the franchise: CSI: Crime Scene Investigation, CSI: Miami, CSI: NY, CSI: Cyber and CSI: Vegas via his production company, Dare to Pass.

Besides his work on CSI, he created the murder mystery show Whodunnit?. Zuiker was also the creator of the web series Cybergeddon. He received a 2013 Pioneer Award from the International Digital Emmy Awards for Cybergeddon. In 2011, he launched BlackBoxTV for YouTube. Most recently, Zuiker launched his first animated series for kids, Mysteryopolis, on Nabi tablets.

== Life and career ==
Zuiker was born in Blue Island, Illinois. When he was six months old, his family moved to Las Vegas, Nevada, where his mother, Diana, worked as a blackjack dealer, and his father as a maître d'. Zuiker attended Chaparral High School in Las Vegas, Nevada. He attended Arizona State University in Tempe, Arizona, for three years and then transferred to the University of La Verne in La Verne, California, before transferring to the University of Nevada, Las Vegas, where he graduated. During all four years he was involved in competitive forensics, advancing as far as semifinals at the national speech tournament.

His first script named The Runner was given to the William Morris Agency by his high school friend Dustin Lee Abraham (who worked as a runner for the Jewish mob while in high school) and returned with the message "No on writer, no on movie." Zuiker was demoralized stating "I was like, wow that’s a bummer." After initially failing with the William Morris Agency, they sold the script to a Showtime director for a mere $25,000 before the Creative Artists Agency had reviewed it. CAA had found a lucrative buyer but the director refused to sell and instead produced what Abraham felt was a lackluster film, The Runner, in 1999 (although it starred John Goodman, Courteney Cox, and Ron Eldard).

This early effort led him to pursue scriptwriting as a profession. In a talk at the International Mystery Writers Festival in June 2008, Zuiker said that he was working as a tram driver in Las Vegas when he came up with the idea for the series. He said he was about to go out to play basketball with some friends when his first wife asked him to stay in and watch The New Detectives on the Discovery Channel. "I decided to stay, and that changed everything". He also freely admitted that he knew nothing about writing for TV and therefore his pilot script "broke all the rules," thereby creating the programs' characteristic visual and storytelling styles. His concept was picked up by David Seltzer at Addis/Wechsler who showed it to his manager Margaret Riley and they proceeded to market it to the various agencies. Creative Artists agent Scott Greenberg liked the script and brought him to the attention of Jonathan Littman, president of Jerry Bruckheimer Television, and Zuiker was signed to produce for television. Nina Tassler, then head of drama at CBS successfully pitched the script to her superiors and a contract was signed.

The show's success led a joint venture overall deal with CBS Productions and Alliance Atlantis, which occurred on June 5, 2003.

== Criticism ==
On October 25, 2007, he received the Big Brother Award Austria 2007 in the category of communication and marketing. The jury stated among other things, "The CSI television series present computer surveillance, DNA-analysis and the overthrow of civil rights in an uncritical, trivialized and dangerously onesided kind of way". Furthermore, the rights of people in general and the suspects in particular would be pictured primarily as impediments of investigations.

== Personal life ==
In 1999, he married his first wife, Jennifer Zuiker, with whom he has three sons. The couple later divorced. In 2013, he married schoolteacher Michelle Territo.

== Books ==
On September 8, 2009, Zuiker released Level 26: Dark Origins, a book with associated web-based motion picture and interactive elements which he terms a "digi-novel". Zuiker has produced 20 cinematic cyber-bridges, which readers will be prompted to view online using special codes embedded in the book's text every 20 pages or so. The Level26.com website and online community was created with the help of Miles Beckett, the creator of hit faux vlogger lonelygirl15. "I wanted to tell a story 'too hot' for television while at the same time giving the existing crime reader a different experience, " says Zuiker.

On October 14, 2010, Level 26: Dark Prophecy was released, and a third Level 26 book was released in 2011; it was also released as an iPad application, which was designed and developed by Hooray.

Sqweegel, the forensic-proof serial killer from the first Level 26 novel Dark Origins, appeared in a season 11 episode of CSI: Crime Scene Investigation as the central character.

Zuiker released a personal memoir in 2011, Mr. CSI: How a Vegas Dreamer Made a Killing in Hollywood, One Body at a Time (HarperCollins). He is also the author of Whodunnit?: Murder in Mystery Manor (Hyperion).

== Philanthropy ==
A new school theater is named after him: the Anthony E. Zuiker Theater at the Chaparral High School (Nevada). Zuiker is a 1986 graduate of the school.
