= CSI (franchise) =

Franchise of American television series (2000-2016/2021-2024)

- CSI series logos
- Created by: Anthony E. Zuiker
- Original work: CSI: Crime Scene Investigation
- Owner: CBS Studios
- Years: 2000–2016; 2021–2024

Print publications
- Book: CSI novels
- Comics: CSI comics
- Magazine: CSI Magazine

Films and television
- Television series: CSI: Crime Scene Investigation; CSI: Miami; CSI: NY; CSI: Cyber; CSI: Vegas; The Real CSI: Miami
- Television film: Immortality

Games
- Traditional: CSI: Crime Scene Investigation: The Board Game; CSI: Crime Game Booster Pack; CSI: Senses: The Game; CSI: Miami: The Board Game; CSI: Board Game
- Video game(s): CSI: Crime Scene Investigation; CSI: Dark Motives; CSI: 3 Dimensions of Murder; CSI: Hard Evidence; CSI: Miami; CSI: NY; CSI: Deadly Intent; CSI: Crime City; CSI: Fatal Conspiracy

Miscellaneous
- Toys: CSI: Forensics Lab; CSI: DNA Laboratory; CSI: Forensic Facial
- Exhibition: CSI: The Experience

CSI (Crime Scene Investigation) is a media franchise of American television series created by Anthony E. Zuiker and owned by CBS Studios. The first three CSI series follow the work of forensic scientists as they unveil the circumstances behind mysterious deaths, while the fourth series, CSI: Cyber, emphasizes behavioral psychology and how it can be applied to cyber forensics.

CSI: Crime Scene Investigation began on October 6, 2000, and ran for fifteen full seasons. Starring (at various times) William Petersen, Ted Danson, Marg Helgenberger, Elisabeth Shue, and Laurence Fishburne, the series concluded its run with a two-hour finale entitled "Immortality" on September 27, 2015. The series' original lead characters, Gil Grissom and Catherine Willows, were based upon Las Vegas Metropolitan Police Department (LVMPD) Crime Scene Analysts Daniel Holstein and Yolanda McClary. CSI's first spin-off and the second series within the franchise is CSI: Miami, which ran for ten seasons between 2002 and 2012, and was canceled on May 13, 2012. Miami stars David Caruso and Emily Procter, with its lead character, Horatio Caine, based upon Los Angeles Police Department (LAPD) bomb squad technician Detective John Haynes.

In 2004, CSI: Miami spun off CSI: NY, the third series in the franchise and the only indirect spin-off of CSI. It was canceled on May 10, 2013, after nine seasons. The series starred Gary Sinise, Melina Kanakaredes, and Sela Ward. In 2014, CSI spun off CSI: Cyber, its second direct spin-off and the fourth series in the franchise. Cyber premiered in 2015, and starred Patricia Arquette and franchise alumnus Ted Danson—the only actor to appear as a series regular in more than one CSI series. The lead character, Avery Ryan, was inspired by cyber-psychologist Mary Aiken, who was attached to the series as a producer. CSI: Cyber was canceled on May 12, 2016.

In 2020, CBS began considering a limited series revival featuring original CSI: Crime Scene Investigation cast members, William Petersen and Jorja Fox. It was eventually greenlighted, with a video teaser for CSI: Vegas released on March 31, 2021, the season airing from October 6 to December 8, 2021, and renewed for a second season without either Petersen or Fox, starring original CSI: Crime Scene Investigation cast member Marg Helgenberger, airing for another two seasons from September 29, 2022, to May 19, 2024, before its cancellation.

Five television series make up the CSI franchise: Crime Scene Investigation, Miami, NY, Cyber, and Vegas. All series in total amount to 838 episodes across 39 seasons of television.

== Overview ==
The CSI franchise is available in 200 territories with an audience of two billion people. Various spin-offs have been developed to cater for the market including novels, comic books, and computer games.

The franchise has had a large cultural impact. It has spawned what has been called the "CSI effect", in which juries often have unreasonable expectations of real-life forensics because of what they have seen on CSI. Equally, the new-found popularity of forensics dramas on television has led to an increase in applications for courses dealing with forensic science or archaeological science—in the United Kingdom applications are up by 30%. The franchise is so influential that fellow CBS show How I Met Your Mother advertised itself as "not a Crime Scene Investigation show". In some ways the franchise may also fill a cultural need:

"We started in 2000 and it was a success, but our ratings really shot up after the September 11 attacks," Zuiker says in a documentary about the CSI phenomenon to be aired at Christmas [2007]. "People were rushing to us for their comfort food. There was a sense of justice in CSI: Crime Scene Investigation – it helped to know that there were people like our characters out there helping to solve crimes. And, of course, 9/11 was the world's largest crime scene."

The "CSI effect" is considered by some experts to be responsible for helping criminals covering up evidence that could be used to trace them using techniques learned by watching CSI and other shows in the same genre. A 2018 study could not find conclusive evidence for the existence of this effect.

=== Series ===
CSI: Miami and CSI: Cyber spun off from CSI, and CSI: NY spun off from CSI: Miami, all via backdoor pilot episodes. CSI: Vegas was not launched via a backdoor pilot episode, and instead premiered 21 years to the day of CSI: Crime Scene Investigation's launch.

Series	Season	Episodes	Originally released		Rank	Rating
Series	Season	Episodes	First released	Last released	Rank	Rating
CSI: Crime Scene Investigation	1	23	October 6, 2000	May 17, 2001	10	20.8
CSI: Crime Scene Investigation	2	23	September 27, 2001	May 16, 2002	2	23.7
CSI: Crime Scene Investigation	3	23	September 26, 2002	May 15, 2003	1	26.12
CSI: Crime Scene Investigation	4	23	September 25, 2003	May 20, 2004	2	25.27
CSI: Crime Scene Investigation	5	25	September 23, 2004	May 19, 2005	2	26.26
CSI: Crime Scene Investigation	6	24	September 22, 2005	May 18, 2006	3	24.86
CSI: Crime Scene Investigation	7	24	September 21, 2006	May 17, 2007	4	20.34
CSI: Crime Scene Investigation	8	17	September 27, 2007	May 15, 2008	9	16.62
CSI: Crime Scene Investigation	9	24	October 9, 2008	May 14, 2009	4	18.52
CSI: Crime Scene Investigation	10	23	September 24, 2009	May 20, 2010	12	14.92
CSI: Crime Scene Investigation	11	22	September 23, 2010	May 12, 2011	12	13.52
CSI: Crime Scene Investigation	12	22	September 21, 2011	May 9, 2012	21	12.49
CSI: Crime Scene Investigation	13	22	September 26, 2012	May 15, 2013	23	11.63
CSI: Crime Scene Investigation	14	22	September 25, 2013	May 7, 2014	18	11.86
CSI: Crime Scene Investigation	15	18	September 28, 2014	February 15, 2015	34	11.19
CSI: Crime Scene Investigation	Finale	2	September 27, 2015		—N/a	12.22
CSI: Miami	Backdoor pilot		May 9, 2002		—N/a	—N/a
CSI: Miami	1	24	September 23, 2002	May 19, 2003	12	16.45
CSI: Miami	2	24	September 22, 2003	May 24, 2004	9	18.06
CSI: Miami	3	24	September 20, 2004	May 23, 2005	7	19.00
CSI: Miami	4	25	September 19, 2005	May 22, 2006	9	18.12
CSI: Miami	5	24	September 18, 2006	May 14, 2007	12	16.98
CSI: Miami	6	21	September 24, 2007	May 19, 2008	16	13.91
CSI: Miami	7	25	September 22, 2008	May 18, 2009	13	14.26
CSI: Miami	8	24	September 21, 2009	May 24, 2010	24	12.65
CSI: Miami	9	22	October 3, 2010	May 8, 2011	27	11.75
CSI: Miami	10	19	September 25, 2011	April 8, 2012	36	10.84
CSI: NY	Backdoor pilot		May 17, 2004		—N/a	—N/a
CSI: NY	1	23	September 22, 2004	May 18, 2005	21	13.59
CSI: NY	2	24	September 28, 2005	May 17, 2006	22	14.04
CSI: NY	3	24	September 20, 2006	May 16, 2007	25	13.92
CSI: NY	4	21	September 26, 2007	May 21, 2008	28	11.71
CSI: NY	5	25	September 24, 2008	May 14, 2009	17	13.50
CSI: NY	6	23	September 23, 2009	May 26, 2010	23	12.66
CSI: NY	7	22	September 24, 2010	May 13, 2011	37	10.73
CSI: NY	8	18	September 23, 2011	May 11, 2012	38	10.34
CSI: NY	9	17	September 21, 2012	February 22, 2013	26	11.27
CSI: Cyber	Backdoor pilots		April 30, 2014	November 16, 2014	—N/a	—N/a
CSI: Cyber	1	13	March 4, 2015	May 13, 2015	39	10.51
CSI: Cyber	2	18	October 4, 2015	March 13, 2016	50	8.50
CSI: Vegas	1	10	October 6, 2021	December 8, 2021	30	6.80
CSI: Vegas	2	21	September 29, 2022	May 18, 2023	36	5.66
CSI: Vegas	3	10	February 18, 2024	May 19, 2024	30	6.15

=== Timeline ===
CSI: Miami and CSI: Cyber spun off from CSI, and CSI: NY spun off from CSI: Miami, all via backdoor-pilot episodes.

Series	Television seasons																								Duration
Series	2000/01	2001/02	2002/03	2003/04	2004/05	2005/06	2006/07	2007/08	2008/09	2009/10	2010/11	2011/12	2012/13	2013/14	2014/15	2015/16	2016/17	2017/18	2018/19	2019/20	2020/21	2021/22	2022/23	2023/24	Duration
CSI	1	2	3	4	5	6	7	8	9	10	11	12	13	14	15	Finale									2000–15
CSI: Miami		Pilot	1	2	3	4	5	6	7	8	9	10													2002–12
CSI: NY				Pilot	1	2	3	4	5	6	7	8	9												2004–13
CSI: Cyber														Pilot	1	2									2015–16
CSI: Vegas																						1	2	3	2021–24

== Characters ==
Series	Character	Series appearances					Actor	First	Last
Series	Character	CSI	Miami	NY	Cyber	Vegas	Actor	First	Last
CSI: Crime Scene Investigation	Gil Grissom (Note: In addition to appearing in CSI: Crime Scene Investigation and CSI: Vegas, Petersen also guest-starred as Grissom in "Where and Why", episode 6.06 of Without a Trace.)	Main				Main	William Petersen	2000	2021
CSI: Crime Scene Investigation	Catherine Willows	Main				Main	Marg Helgenberger	2000	2024
CSI: Crime Scene Investigation	Warrick Brown	Main					Gary Dourdan	2000	2008
CSI: Crime Scene Investigation	Nick Stokes	Main					George Eads	2000	2015
CSI: Crime Scene Investigation	Jim Brass	Main				Guest	Paul Guilfoyle	2000	2021
CSI: Crime Scene Investigation	Sara Sidle	Main				Main	Jorja Fox	2000	2021
CSI: Crime Scene Investigation	Greg Sanders	Main				Recurring	Eric Szmanda	2000	2023
CSI: Crime Scene Investigation	Al Robbins	Main					Robert David Hall	2000	2015
CSI: Crime Scene Investigation	Sofia Curtis	Main					Louise Lombard	2004	2011
CSI: Crime Scene Investigation	David Hodges	Main				Recurring	Wallace Langham	2003	2021
CSI: Crime Scene Investigation	Riley Adams	Main					Lauren Lee Smith	2008	2009
CSI: Crime Scene Investigation	Raymond Langston	Main	Guest	Guest			Laurence Fishburne	2008	2011
CSI: Crime Scene Investigation	Wendy Simms	Main					Liz Vassey	2005	2010
CSI: Crime Scene Investigation	David Phillips	Main					David Berman	2000	2015
CSI: Crime Scene Investigation	D.B. Russell (Note: Ted Danson joined the main cast of CSI: Cyber following the ending of CSI: Crime Scene Investigation.)	Main		Guest	Main		Ted Danson	2011	2016
CSI: Crime Scene Investigation	Morgan Brody	Main					Elisabeth Harnois	2011	2015
CSI: Crime Scene Investigation	Julie Finlay	Main					Elisabeth Shue	2012	2015
CSI: Crime Scene Investigation	Henry Andrews	Main					Jon Wellner	2005	2015
CSI: Miami	Horatio Caine	Guest	Main	Guest			David Caruso	2002	2012
CSI: Miami	Calleigh Duquesne	Guest	Main				Emily Procter	2002	2012
CSI: Miami	Eric Delko	Guest	Main				Adam Rodriguez	2002	2012
CSI: Miami	Alexx Woods	Guest	Main				Khandi Alexander	2002	2009
CSI: Miami	Tim Speedle	Guest	Main				Rory Cochrane	2002	2007
CSI: Miami	Megan Donner		Main				Kim Delaney	2002	2002
CSI: Miami	Yelina Salas		Main				Sofia Milos	2003	2009
CSI: Miami	Ryan Wolfe		Main				Jonathan Togo	2004	2012
CSI: Miami	Frank Tripp		Main				Rex Linn	2003	2012
CSI: Miami	Natalia Boa Vista		Main				Eva LaRue	2005	2012
CSI: Miami	Tara Price		Main				Megalyn Echikunwoke	2008	2009
CSI: Miami	Jesse Cardoza		Main				Eddie Cibrian	2009	2010
CSI: Miami	Walter Simmons		Main				Omar Benson Miller	2009	2012
CSI: NY	Mac Taylor	Guest	Guest	Main			Gary Sinise	2004	2013
CSI: NY	Stella Bonasera		Guest	Main			Melina Kanakaredes	2004	2010
CSI: NY	Danny Messer		Guest	Main			Carmine Giovinazzo	2004	2013
CSI: NY	Aiden Burn		Guest	Main			Vanessa Ferlito	2004	2006
CSI: NY	Sheldon Hawkes		Guest	Main			Hill Harper	2004	2013
CSI: NY	Don Flack			Main			Eddie Cahill	2004	2013
CSI: NY	Lindsay Monroe			Main			Anna Belknap	2005	2013
CSI: NY	Sid Hammerback			Main			Robert Joy	2005	2013
CSI: NY	Adam Ross			Main			A. J. Buckley	2005	2013
CSI: NY	Jo Danville			Main			Sela Ward	2010	2013
CSI: Cyber	Avery Ryan	Guest			Main		Patricia Arquette	2014	2016
CSI: Cyber	Elijah Mundo				Main		James Van Der Beek	2015	2016
CSI: Cyber	Simon Sifter				Main		Peter MacNicol	2015	2015
CSI: Cyber	Brody Nelson				Main		Shad Moss	2015	2016
CSI: Cyber	Daniel Krumitz				Main		Charley Koontz	2015	2016
CSI: Cyber	Raven Ramirez				Main		Hayley Kiyoko	2015	2016
CSI: Cyber	D.B. Russell	Main		Guest	Main		Ted Danson	2011	2016
CSI: Vegas	Maxine Roby					Main	Paula Newsome	2021	2024
CSI: Vegas	Josh Folsom					Main	Matt Lauria	2021	2024
CSI: Vegas	Allie Rajan					Main	Mandeep Dhillon	2021	2024
CSI: Vegas	Hugo Ramirez					Main	Mel Rodriguez	2021	2021
CSI: Vegas	Sara Sidle	Main				Main	Jorja Fox	2000	2021
CSI: Vegas	Gil Grissom	Main				Main	William Petersen	2000	2021
CSI: Vegas	Chris Park					Main	Jay Lee	2021	2024
CSI: Vegas	Serena Chavez					Main	Ariana Guerra	2022	2024
CSI: Vegas	Beau Finado					Main	Lex Medlin	2022	2024
CSI: Vegas	Catherine Willows	Main				Main	Marg Helgenberger	2000	2024

== Differences between series ==
=== Las Vegas (CSI: Crime Scene Investigation and CSI: Vegas) ===
The Las Vegas team are scientists foremost, and follow the evidence. Las Vegas Police Department (LVPD) CSIs are not employed as police officers. The crimes the Las Vegas CSI team face (other than the standard murders, attempted murders, kidnappings, and rapes) include casino robberies, bodies found buried in the Nevada desert, and murders during different conventions at casinos.

Crime lab
The Las Vegas Metropolitan Police Department Crime Lab is a modern crime lab and shares a lot (but not a building) with the Las Vegas Police Department. It reports to the sheriff's office. In early episodes of season one the lab is frequently referred to as the number two crime lab in the United States, solving cases believed unsolvable. The lab consists of specialist laboratories, a larger office (usually used by the Grave Supervisor), a smaller office used by Catherine Willows between seasons 5 and 12, a locker room, an AV room, a break-room, and stairs leading to a second floor, housing offices for senior staff.

=== Miami (CSI: Miami) ===
The Miami team are detectives foremost, and mainly use theories to solve crimes. The crimes the Miami-Dade Police Department's (MDPD) CSI team face (other than the standard murders, attempted murders, kidnappings, and rapes) include drug running, murdered refugees from Cuba, bodies found washed up on the beach, bodies dumped in the Everglades, and crimes involving the rich and famous who have secrets to hide in their mansions and beachfront properties.

Crime lab
The Miami CSIs were firstly, stationed out of a broom closet next to the MDPD's bull pen. They were given their own building prior to the start of the third season. Originally dark and technical, this building housed Horatio's office, Megan's office, specialist labs, and a locker room. During the fourth season a government grant meant that slanted glass walls, multiple modern labs, an interrogation room, and a new locker room were all constructed. Horatio's office is not seen following the lab's reconstruction—although a state-of-the-art ballistics suite was added, acting as Calleigh's office. The lab has reinforced windows and shutters to protect against hurricanes and tsunamis.

=== New York City (CSI: NY) ===
The New York team are equally scientists and detectives, and frequently use criminal profiling (as well as evidence and theories) to solve cases. The crimes the New York CSI team face (other than the standard murders, attempted murders, kidnappings, and rapes) include organized crime activity involving the Italian Mafia, street-gang violence, and ethnic, cultural, and ability differences.

Crime lab
During the first season, the New York City Police Department (NYPD) CSI lab is in an old underground building with rustic brick walls. The lab houses Mac's office, a locker room, the autopsy suite, and specialist forensic laboratories. As of the second season the lab is on the 35th floor of a high-rise building in Manhattan. Equipped with glass walls and state-of-the-art equipment, this lab consists of the Supervisor's office (belonging to Mac, and – for a short time – Jo), specialist laboratories, an observation walkway, a break-room and kitchen, a locker room, and an office belonging to the Assistant Supervisor (first Stella, then Jo), containing an additional hot-desk used by Hawkes, Danny, Lindsay, and Aiden. Part of this second lab is blown up in the season three finale, "Snow Day", but is restored by the beginning of season four.

=== Washington, D.C. (CSI: Cyber) ===
The Cyber team focuses on the technical aspect of crimes, with NextGen forensics providing it with a real-world crime scene investigative counterpart. The FBI Cyber Crime Division investigates cyber-based terrorism, internet-related murders, espionage, computer intrusions, major cyber-fraud, cyber-theft, hacking, sex offenses, blackmail, and any other crime deemed to be cyber-related within the FBI's jurisdiction.

Divisions
— Cyber Crime Division
The FBI Cyber Crime Division operates out of Washington, D.C. and is housed in the Cyber Threat Operations Center. The CTOC consists of Ryan's office, Russell's office, a communications bull pen housing the desks of Krumitz, Nelson, and Ramirez, a cyber lab, a glass walkway, and a 'tear-down room'. Due to their nomadic nature the team are often seen interviewing suspects at various FBI field offices and police departments.

— Next Generation Cyber Forensics Division
The Next Generation Cyber Forensics Division is a lab-based facility within the Cyber Crime Division used for the processing of evidence in cyber-related cases.

== Theme songs ==
The opening themes for all five series are remixes of songs performed by The Who.

Series	Theme song
CSI: Crime Scene Investigation	"Who Are You"
CSI: Miami	"Won't Get Fooled Again"
CSI: NY	"Baba O'Riley"
CSI: Cyber	"I Can See for Miles"
CSI: Vegas	"Who Are You"

== Crossovers ==
Crossovers are possible between CSI series as well as with other programs within the same creative stable. Between the series the baton is passed to the new CSI series via a crossover/pilot where cases are overlapped and personnel are shared. Many actors have appeared in two of the series. Five actors have appeared in three: David Caruso, Laurence Fishburne, and Gary Sinise all appeared in CSI, CSI: Miami, and CSI: NY, while Ted Danson appeared as a guest star on CSI: NY and a series regular on both CSI and CSI: Cyber, making him the first actor to be a main character in more than one CSI series. Before becoming a regular as "Danny Messer" on CSI: NY, Carmine Giovinazzo had a small role as "Thumpy G" in an episode of CSI, making him the only lead actor to play two characters within the franchise. Crossovers have also, on occasion, taken place between a CSI series and a series outside the franchise.

=== Within the franchise ===
Crossover between			Episode	Type	Actors crossing over	Date aired
Series A	Series B	Series C	Episode	Type	Actors crossing over	Date aired
CSI	CSI: Miami	—N/a	"Cross Jurisdictions" (CSI 2.22)	Backdoor pilot	Series A: David Caruso, Emily Procter, Adam Rodriguez, Rory Cochrane, Khandi Alexander	May 9, 2002
Catherine and Warrick team up with Horatio Caine to investigate the murder of Las Vegas' former chief and the kidnapping of his wife and daughter following a wild party.
CSI: Miami	CSI: NY	—N/a	"MIA/NYC NonStop" (CSI: Miami 2.23)	Backdoor pilot	Series A: Gary Sinise, Melina Kanakaredes, Carmine Giovinazzo, Vanessa Ferlito, Hill Harper	May 17, 2004
Horatio travels to New York believing it to be the residence of someone who committed a double homicide. He is assisted by Mac Taylor who suspects that the crimes in Miami might be connected to the murder of an undercover New York cop.
CSI: NY	CSI	—N/a	"Grand Master" (CSI: NY 1.04)	Character appearance	Series A: Ricky Harris	October 27, 2004
CSI consultant Disco Placid (first seen in "Anonymous") consults on the audio aspects of a murder that takes place during a turntable competition.
CSI: Miami	CSI: NY	—N/a	"Felony Flight" (CSI: Miami 4.07) "Manhattan Manhunt" (CSI: NY 2.07)	Two-night event	Series A: Gary Sinise Series B: David Caruso	November 7, 2005 November 9, 2005
A convicted serial killer, Henry Darius, sabotages and escapes an airplane that was flying him from New York to Miami, where he supposedly buried a body. After fleeing the crash site he goes on a killing spree and abducts a college student. Since Darius was originally arrested in New York, Mac Taylor arrives in Miami to help Horatio track the killer down. Darius murders a group of teens in a luxury apartment where he tries to rob a security vault.
CSI: Miami	CSI: NY	CSI	"Bone Voyage" (CSI: Miami 8.07) "Hammer Down" (CSI: NY 6.07) "The Lost Girls" (CSI 10.07)	Three-part crossover	Series A & B: Laurence Fishburne	November 9, 2009 November 11, 2009 November 12, 2009
Main article: CSI: Trilogy Ray Langston arrives in Miami to investigate a severed leg found in the Everglades that belonged to a girl who disappeared in Las Vegas a week before. He discovers a human-trafficking ring that specializes in black-market organ harvesting that leads him to New York where he assists Mac in attempting to free a hostage. Ray returns to Las Vegas to find a missing girl who's been taken by the human traffickers and may be part of a prostitution ring.
CSI	CSI: NY	—N/a	"In Vino Veritas" (CSI 13.13) "Seth and Apep" (CSI: NY 9.15)	Two-night event	Series A: Gary Sinise Series B: Ted Danson	February 6, 2013 February 8, 2013
Mac Taylor visits Las Vegas to surprise his girlfriend, Christine, who is missing upon his arrival. It turns out she was kidnapped in New York before the trip and a look-alike took her place. D.B Russell insists on accompanying Mac back to New York to help find her.
CSI	CSI: Cyber	—N/a	"Kitty" (CSI 14.21)	Backdoor pilot	Series A: Patricia Arquette	April 30, 2014
Avery Ryan, a Special Agent attached to the FBI Cyber Crime Division, travels to Las Vegas when the murder of a casino mogul's wife is linked to an UnSub she has been tracking who commits crimes on the internet that play out in the real world.
CSI	CSI: Cyber	—N/a	"The Twin Paradox" (CSI 15.06)	Guest appearance	Series A: Patricia Arquette	November 16, 2014
Finlay leads the CSI team in a hunt for Seattle's notorious Gig Harbor Killer, while Russell meets with colleague Avery Ryan for advice on how to catch a mentally unstable serial killer.

=== With other series in CSI universe ===
Crossover between		Episode	Type	Actors crossing over	Date aired
Series A	Series B	Episode	Type	Actors crossing over	Date aired
CSI: NY	Cold Case	"Cold Reveal" (CSI: NY 3.22)	Guest appearance	Series A: Danny Pino	May 2, 2007
When Stella Bonasera's DNA matches evidence found during a Cold Case investigation in Philadelphia, Detective Scotty Valens visits the New York Crime Lab in order to rule her out as a homicide suspect.
CSI	Without a Trace	"Who and What" (CSI 8.06) "Where and Why" (Without a Trace 6.06)	Two-hour event	Series A: Anthony LaPaglia Series B: William Petersen	November 8, 2007
Jack Malone joins forces with Grissom to track a serial killer since a boy who was kidnapped in New York six years before matches the profile of a Las Vegas murder victim. The two of them establish the killer's pattern of behavior to track him down.

=== With other series (non canon) ===
Crossover between		Episode	Type	Actors crossing over	Date aired
Series A	Series B	Episode	Type	Actors crossing over	Date aired
Two and a Half Men	CSI	"Fish in a Drawer" (Two and a Half Men 5.17) "Two and a Half Deaths" (CSI 8.16)	Writer exchange	Series A: George Eads Series B: Charlie Sheen, Jon Cryer, Angus T. Jones	May 5, 2008 May 8, 2008
The two shows' writers swapped roles. George Eads appears in "Fish in a Drawer" as a wedding guest when a man is found dead, possibly murdered. In "Two and a Half Deaths" Grissom investigates the death of a sitcom diva who was filming in Las Vegas. Sheen, Cryer, and Jones appear as themselves wearing the same clothes from "Fish in a Drawer".
CSI	MythBusters	"Theory of Everything" (CSI 8.15) "Fireball Stun Gun" (MythBusters 8.10)	Cameo appearance	Series A: Jamie Hyneman, Adam Savage	May 1, 2008 June 2, 2010
The team investigates an abundance of cases that turn out to be related, including the death of a man who may have spontaneously combusted in police custody due to the combination of two supposedly nonlethal weapons: pepper spray and a stun gun. Hyneman and Savage appear in "Theory of Everything" as lab technicians watching Nick test the idea and then later on MythBusters test it themselves in earnest and find it plausible.

== British TV movies ==
In the UK, Channel 5 edited together related episodes to make one whole feature. These include:

Series	Title	Episodes edited together	Runtime
CSI: Crime Scene Investigation	The CSI Pilot Movie	"Pilot" / "Cool Change"	
CSI: Crime Scene Investigation	The CSI Movie: Grave Danger	"Grave Danger (Part 1)" / "Grave Danger (Part 2)"	
CSI: Crime Scene Investigation	The CSI Movie: Bullet	"A Bullet Runs Through It (Part 1)" / "A Bullet Runs Through It (Part 2)"	110 mins
CSI: Crime Scene Investigation	The CSI Movie: Bang-Bang	"Bang-Bang" / "Way to Go"	110 mins
CSI: Crime Scene Investigation	The CSI Movie: Built to Kill	"Built to Kill (Part 1)" / "Built to Kill (Part 2)"	110 mins
CSI: Crime Scene Investigation	The CSI Movie: Dr Who & Mr Jekyll	"Doctor Who" / "Meat Jekyll"	105 mins
CSI: Crime Scene Investigation	The CSI Movie: Immortality	"Immortality Part I" / "Immortality Part II"	87 mins
CSI: Miami	The CSI Movie: Crisis	"No Man's Land" / "Man Down"	105 mins
CSI: Miami	The CSI Movie: Fallen	"All Fall Down" / "Fallen"	105 mins
CSI: NY	The CSI Movie: Revenge	"Nothing for Something" / "Life Sentence"	100 mins

Also Channel 5 will sometimes group episodes with similar themes together such as:

- Psychopaths called "CSI: Psycho Season" – episodes involve characters such as Paul Millander, Nate Haskell (The Dick & Jane Killer), and Charlie DiMasa (Dr. Jekyll) from CSI; Antonio Riaz, Walter Resden, and Clavo Cruz from CSI: Miami; and Shane Casey, Clay Dobson, Hollis Eckhart (The Compass Killer), and The Cabbie Killer from CSI: NY.
- Home Invasion Murders – episodes include "Blood Drops" and "Gum Drops" from CSI, "Slaughterhouse" from CSI: Miami, and "Damned If You Do" and "Who's There?" from CSI: NY.
- Cop killings called "CSI: Cops in Crisis" – episodes include "Cop Killer" from CSI: Miami as well as the episodes where regular CSI characters are killed such as Warrick Brown, Tim Speedle, Aiden Burn and Jessica Angell.
- Domestic murders between couples called "CSI: Murder and Matrimony" – episodes include "Just Murdered" and "Divorce Party" from CSI: Miami.
- Guest celebrities called "CSI: Celeb" including the episodes featuring Justin Bieber, Taylor Swift and Kim Kardashian among others.
- Christmas themed episodes called "A CSI Christmas" – episodes include "The Lost Reindeer" from CSI and "Silent Night", "Forbidden Fruit", "Second Chances" and "Shop Till You Drop" from CSI: NY. Also Channel 5 might include Christmas themed episodes from other crime dramas such as the NCIS franchise, The Mentalist and Castle.

== Other media ==
=== Comics ===
There have been a number of comic books based on all three series published by IDW Publishing. Writers include Jeff Mariotte and Max Allan Collins.

=== Games ===
The CSI franchise has spawned 12 computer games published by Ubisoft across the three shows. Nine for CSI: Crime Scene Investigation: CSI: Crime Scene Investigation–2003, CSI: Dark Motives–2004, CSI: 3 Dimensions of Murder–2006, CSI: Hard Evidence–2007, CSI: Deadly Intent–2009, CSI: Fatal Conspiracy–2010, CSI: Unsolved–2010, CSI: Crime City–2010, and CSI: Hidden Crimes–2014. Two for CSI: Miami: CSI: Miami–2004 and CSI: Miami – Heat Wave–2012. One for CSI: NY: CSI: NY – The Game–2008.

Gameloft has also published a series of mobile games based on the CSI series including CSI: The Mobile Game (Vegas) and CSI: Miami.

In addition, several board games and puzzles based on all three series have seen release, all published by Canadian game manufacturer Specialty Board Games, Inc. In 2011, the CSI Board Game was released by another Canadian company, GDC–GameDevCo Ltd. It is the first game to include all three CSI shows.

A pinball game machine called CSI: Crime Scene Investigation was released in 2008.

=== Exhibition ===
Chicago's Museum of Science & Industry opened an exhibit in CSI's honor on May 25, 2007 called: "CSI: The Experience". In October 2011 it was at Discovery Times Square in New York City. There is also a game on the website where players are trained in forensic biology, weapons and tool mark analyses, toxicology and the autopsy.

=== Novels ===
Various tie-in novels have appeared based on the series. Authors include Max Allan Collins (CSI: Crime Scene Investigation), Donn Cortez (CSI: Miami), Stuart M. Kaminsky (CSI: NY), and Keith R.A. DeCandido (CSI: NY).

=== Magazine ===
Titan Magazines published 11 issues of CSI Magazine starting in November 2007. They contained a mixture of features and interviews looking into the world of the three CSIs and the people who help create it. They were available in the UK and US.

=== Toys ===
A range of toys have been developed. These include:

- "CSI: Forensics Lab"
- "CSI: DNA Laboratory"
- "CSI: Forensic Facial"

However, they have been the source of some controversy. The Parents Television Council, who have complained about CSI in general, in 2004 released a statement specifically aimed at the toys. The PTC e-mailed letters to their supporters, telling them the content of the games were entirely inappropriate for children to be exposed to "because the CSI franchise often displays graphic images, including close-ups of corpses with gunshot wounds and other bloody injuries." The letter went on to say "The PTC doesn't think the recreation of blood, guts and gore should be under a child's Christmas tree this year," PTC concluded. "This so-called 'toy' is a blatant attempt to market CSI and its adult-oriented content directly to children."

In urging members to file a complaint with the Federal Trade Commission, PTC said CBS parent company Viacom needed to hear from parents who are concerned about the "graphic scenes of blood, violence, and sex" in their product. They also asked their supporters to contact Target and Toys "R" Us.

=== Music ===
In 2008, British indie band Half Man Half Biscuit released the album CSI:Ambleside. The title was parody of the CSI franchise but replaced the glamorous American locations with a sleepy English town.

== World record ==
Producers announced intentions to break the Guinness World Record for largest ever TV simulcast drama on March 4, 2015, with the episode "Kitty" airing in 150 countries in addition to digital streaming. They succeeded in breaking the record by airing CSI: Cyber's backdoor pilot in 171 countries.

== Documentaries ==
Because of the popularity of the CSI franchise in the United Kingdom, Channel 5 created two documentaries about CSI. The first one called The Real CSI follows real crime scene investigators as they work on crime scene. The second documentary, True CSI, features true tales of how forensic science has helped solve some of the world's best known crimes. True CSI had actors re-enacting the crime as well as interviews with people involved in the solving of the crimes themselves. Cases featured included the Sam Sheppard case.

In early 2007, British channel ITV1 broadcast a special of its flagship documentary Tonight with Trevor McDonald discussing the ramifications of the "CSI effect", highlighting the effect of not only the franchise but also several other British and American TV police procedurals.

The popularity of the series has also spawned forensic based reality television/documentary programs, including A&E's The First 48 and truTV's North Mission Road.

In April 2012, PBS's Frontline aired a documentary called The Real CSI investigating the limitations of the CSI techniques in forensic science.

In May 2024, CBS announced an official reality television documentary series spin-off to CSI: Miami titled The Real CSI: Miami which premiered on June 26, 2024.

== See also ==
Other forensic dramas

- Body of Proof
- Bones
- Silent Witness
- Waking the Dead
- Rosewood
