= CSI: The Experience =

Exhibit about crime lab forensic science

CSI: The Experience is a traveling exhibition about crime lab forensic science and technology inspired by the television series CSI: Crime Scene Investigation.

== Development and location ==
The exhibit was developed for the Science Museum Exhibit Collaborative by the Fort Worth Museum of Science and History in partnership with CBS Consumer Products and the National Science Foundation, which provided $2.4 million in funding for both the exhibit and a CSI "Web Adventure" targeted to underserved youth. Approved by the American Academy of Forensic Sciences, the exhibit was developed and designed by numerous partners.

The Museum also developed the exhibit, Whodunit? The Science of Solving Crime in 1993 for the Science Museum Exhibit Collaborative and it has been touring science centers since, exhibiting advances in DNA science and associated information technology.

CSI: The Experience debuted at Chicago's Museum of Science and Industry in May 2007 and opened in the Fort Worth Museum of Science and History's new facility in November 2009. CSI: The Experience is currently touring museums and science centers across the United States, Europe, and Asia. On October 1, 2011, it is displayed at Discovery Times Square in New York City.

From May 25, 2013 to September 2013 it was on display in the Fort Worth Museum of Science and History.

== Features and content ==
CSI: The Experience starts with a video briefing. The visitors start their investigation in one of three crime scenes: a suburban living room with a car crashed through it, a hotel alley, and a remote desert. In each, visitors are asked to identify and gather evidence; analyze materials with the help of scientific techniques; formulate hypotheses about the crime; and confirm and communicate their findings.

CSI: The Experience features 2 separate crime labs ("trace evidence" and "forensic analysis") and an autopsy room where visitors can explore the technology used in evidence analysis. In order to trace vehicle tracks, clothing fibers, and paint chips in the first lab, museum-goers will collect data from microscope analysis to determine where matches occur and how they contribute to the larger hypothesis. Here, visitors can also evaluate digital evidence provided by cell phones and other electronics, in addition to hard evidence such as fingerprints, blood patterns, and ammunition casings.

In a second laboratory space, visitors examine forensic art as they study age progression and attempt to match an image with a victim. Visitors study DNA evidence and observe an autopsy for pathology analysis. At the end of CSI: The Experience, visitors use the scientific information they gathered to answer a series of multiple-choice questions on touch screens. After completing the survey, visitors proceed to a recreation of Gil Grissom's office to present their case. Exhibit-goers can compare their scientific findings to those of expert crime scene investigators.

The exhibit is geared toward adults and youth ages 12 and above.

== Cast and crew promote exhibit ==
CSI: The Experience opened with a press preview on May 23, 2007 at the Museum of Science and Industry which was attended by stars from the cast of CSI: Crime Scene Investigation, including William Petersen, Marg Helgenberger, Gary Dourdan, Jorja Fox, George Eads, Wallace Langham, Eric Szmanda, and Robert David Hall. After the ribbon cutting, several members of the cast took a tour of the interactive exhibit.

== Awards and recognition ==
The Fort Worth Museum of Science and History received the Themed Entertainment Association's Thea Award for Outstanding Achievement for CSI: The Experience.

== See also ==
- Forensic science
- CSI: Crime Scene Investigation
- CSI (franchise)
