= CSI: Crime Scene Investigation season 7 =

American TV show season

CSI: Crime Scene Investigation
- Season 7
- Season 7 U.S. DVD cover
- Starring: William Petersen; Marg Helgenberger; Gary Dourdan; George Eads; Jorja Fox; Eric Szmanda; Robert David Hall; Louise Lombard; Paul Guilfoyle
- No. of episodes: 24

Release
- Original network: CBS
- Original release: September 21, 2006 – May 17, 2007

Season chronology
- ← Previous; Season 6 Next → Season 8

The seventh season of CSI: Crime Scene Investigation premiered on CBS on September 21, 2006, and ended May 17, 2007. The series stars William Petersen and Marg Helgenberger.

== Plot ==
Catherine heads to a small town in Nevada ("Leaving Las Vegas") as Grissom and Sara continue their affair ("Living Doll"), in the seventh season of CSI. Supervised by Grissom and Willows, the Las Vegas Crime Scene Investigators face both personal and professional challenges as Grissom says goodbye, and new CSI Michael Keppler joins the team ("Sweet Jane"), as they investigate the bizarre, the brutal, and the unprecedented, including a chainsaw massacre ("Toe Tags"), a death at a church ("Double-Cross"), a kidnapping ("Burn Out"), a series of miniature killings ("Post Mortem"), the death of identical twins ("Happenstance"), and the return of a 1970s Mob Boss to Vegas ("Living Legend"). Meanwhile, Catherine faces the loss of her father ("Built to Kill"), Greg is assaulted ("Fannysmackin'"), Keppler faces his past ("Law of Gravity"), and the team attempt to hide their amusement when a man is found trapped in concrete ("Loco Motives").

== Cast ==
=== Changes ===
Louise Lombard joins the main cast, and departs at the season's end.

=== Main cast ===
- William Petersen as Gil Grissom, a CSI Level 3 Supervisor
- Marg Helgenberger as Catherine Willows, a CSI Level 3 Assistant Supervisor
- Gary Dourdan as Warrick Brown, a CSI Level 3
- George Eads as Nick Stokes, a CSI Level 3
- Jorja Fox as Sara Sidle, a CSI Level 3
- Eric Szmanda as Greg Sanders, a CSI Level 2
- Robert David Hall as Al Robbins, the Chief Medical Examiner
- Louise Lombard as Sofia Curtis, a Homicide Detective
- Paul Guilfoyle as Jim Brass, a Homicide Detective Captain

=== Recurring cast ===
- Liev Schreiber as Mike Keppler
- Archie Kao as Archie Johnson
- David Berman as David Phillips
- Wallace Langham as David Hodges
- Liz Vassey as Wendy Simms
- Conor O'Farrell as Jeffrey McKeen
- Jessica Collins as Natalie Davis

=== Guest cast ===
- Roger Daltrey as Mickey Dunn

== Episodes ==
No. overall	No. in season	Title	Directed by	Written by	Original release date	US viewers (millions)
142	1	"Built to Kill"	Kenneth Fink	Story by : Sarah Goldfinger; Teleplay by : David Rambo & Naren Shankar	September 21, 2006	22.58
143	2	"Built to Kill"	Kenneth Fink	Story by : David Rambo; Teleplay by : Sarah Goldfinger & Naren Shankar	September 28, 2006	23.77
Part 1: When an unidentified woman is found dead on the set of the MGM Grand show Kà by Cirque Du Soleil, the CSI must study the inner workings of the show to find out what happened. The team also investigates what seems to be a suicide at an implosion party held by Sam Braun. After the cases are solved and closed, Catherine and Nick go out for a dance, but Catherine ends up in a serious situation when she found herself in a daze, then suddenly waking up alone in a cheap motel, motivating her to collect the evidence of the crime herself. Grissom and Sofia then begin to investigate a murder of a former rock idol (Danny Bonaduce), where a detailed miniature model of the crime scene is found near the body. Also: Brass was awarded a special commendation for his role in the hostage situation from last season's "Bang-Bang", but he felt he didn't deserve it. (Special appearance by John Mayer, who played "Waiting on the World to Change" and "Slow Dancing in a Burning Room" during Catherine and Nick's get-together.) Part 2: Grissom and the team continue their investigation of the mysterious death of an aging rockstar (Danny Bonaduce), focusing on both his personal life and the miniature model. Catherine, at first trying to hide the fact that she might have been raped, realizes that someone is targeting her and her family when her daughter gets kidnapped for a $20 million ransom, suspecting that her father Sam Braun may be a potential suspect, only to find out that he was in as much danger as Catherine.
144	3	"Toe Tags"	Jeffrey Hunt	Story by : Allen MacDonald & Carol Mendelsohn; Teleplay by : Richard Catalani & Douglas Petrie	October 5, 2006	21.51
As Grissom gives a group of students a tour of the CSI department, the deceased victims "wake up" and give voice to their own murder investigations: a drowning victim found in an elevator investigated by Catherine; a woman who fell off a cliff investigated by Warrick, Sophia and Greg; a soldier stabbed just after returning from Iraq with his murderer having been poisoned by embalming fluid, investigated by Nick; and two victims of a bizarre chainsaw massacre investigated by Grissom and Sara.
145	4	"Fannysmackin'"	Richard J. Lewis	Dustin Lee Abraham	October 12, 2006	21.85
The team investigates a series of brutal tourist beatings that take place within the span of a few hours throughout the city, all done by a bizarre group of hooded people with strange physical features. The case gets personal for the CSI team when Greg was badly beaten trying to save one of the victims during an assault. (Guest starred Kevin Federline.)
146	5	"Double-Cross"	Michael Slovis	Marlane Meyer	October 19, 2006	20.49
Grissom and his team investigate the case of a woman found crucified in a church. They soon discover evidence of a love triangle dating back to the victim's high school years that could reveal who is responsible for her death.
147	6	"Burn Out"	Alec Smight	Jacqueline Hoyt	November 2, 2006	20.77
When two young boys are reported missing, a known neighborhood sex offender, played by Alan Tudyk, is the primary suspect, initially after being portrayed as a victim of a house fire initially thought to be unrelated to the missing kids. In an attempt to extract his confession, Grissom asks for the pedophile's help in catching the boys' abductor. However, the case turns out to be much more complicated than Grissom or the rest of the CSI team ever expected.
148	7	"Post-Mortem"	Richard J. Lewis	Story by : Naren Shankar; Teleplay by : Dustin Lee Abraham & David Rambo	November 9, 2006	20.83
An elderly woman, a terminal cancer patient with a heavy drinking and smoking habit, was found dead, having been impaled by a broken window as she was trying to flee an intruder; the CSIs look to the neighbor and nephew as possible suspects. Mid-investigation, Grissom receives an exact miniature replica of the current crime scene, changing his thinking on the crime, drawing a connection with the earlier rock star murder. Meanwhile, Greg attends a hearing to ascertain his culpability in the death of a teenager he accidentally killed while defending himself against a mob in "Fannysmackin"; members of the victim's family were quite vocal in believing that his death was intentional. After Greg's actions were ruled as accidental, the victim's family filed a civil suit against him.
149	8	"Happenstance"	Jean de Segonzac	Sarah Goldfinger	November 16, 2006	24.11
The CSIs investigate the death of two identical twins within a two-hour time frame, on opposite sides of town: one having been shot, the other a suicide by hanging. When the team discovers that the twins knew nothing of each other, they begin to wonder if the two cases are connected, or just a very bizarre coincidence.
150	9	"Living Legend"	Martha Coolidge	Story by : Carol Mendelsohn & Douglas Petrie; Teleplay by : Douglas Petrie	November 23, 2006	17.17
The Cadillac of an infamous 1970's mob boss, Mickey Dunn, is found in a lake after he disappeared years ago. Shortly afterwards, a string of murders occur in which the killers almost eagerly leave evidence of their appearance for witnesses and the CSIs. Furthermore, an old picture of the victims standing next to Dunn outside the Desert Inn casino is planted on their bodies. The team must then find out what the connection is between the murders, Dunn and a missing policeman. Roger Daltrey of The Who guest stars as Mickey Dunn. (Also guest starred Barbara Bain.)
151	10	"Loco Motives"	Kenneth Fink	Evan Dunsky	December 7, 2006	23.25
Catherine and Brass find a man trapped in cement near a murder victim at a construction site. However, after being rescued and ruled a suspect, the man refuses to reveal his identity. Meanwhile, Nick, Warrick and Sofia investigate the death of an old woman found in her apartment with her head in an oven, but discover that she didn't die from inhaling gas. Grissom, Sara and Greg investigate a murder at a chicken processing plant which, after another miniature model of the crime scene in discovered, aids them in solving the previously unsolved murders; the trail would lead to a collector of model trains who worked at the chicken plant. (Guest starred Michael Rispoli and Danny Bonaduce.)
152	11	"Leaving Las Vegas"	Richard J. Lewis	Story by : Allen MacDonald & Carol Mendelsohn; Teleplay by : Allen MacDonald	January 4, 2007	26.12
Catherine testifies in a murder trial in which a man is accused of murdering his own mother three years ago, but the suspect is found not guilty. Catherine, however, believes he did commit the crime and that he may also have killed two other people, so she and Nick set out to find the other victims. Catherine's probe leads to a small Nevada town where an elderly woman and her daughter were fatally stabbed and shot three years earlier. Back at the lab, Grissom prepares to leave on a four-week sabbatical; after he left, a large box came for him, which was later revealed to contain another miniature crime scene. Absent: Paul Guilfoyle (Jim Brass).
153	12	"Sweet Jane"	Kenneth Fink	Kenneth Fink & Naren Shankar	January 18, 2007	21.41
Catherine investigates the murder of a runaway teen whose naked body is found in a desert lot behind a hotel. Helping with the case is Mike Keppler (played by Liev Schreiber), an experienced CSI from Baltimore who is the newest hire on the day shift but is filling in temporarily on the night shift since Grissom is on sabbatical. Their investigation reveals the dead girl may be the victim of a serial killer whose slayings of "Jane Does" may go back decades. (Also guest starred Ned Beatty.) Absent: William Petersen (Gil Grissom)
154	13	"Redrum"	Martha Coolidge	Story by : Richard Catalani & David Rambo; Teleplay by : Jacqueline Hoyt & Carol Mendelsohn	January 25, 2007	21.17
Keppler persuades Catherine to help him fake a crime scene and deceive their colleagues in a controversial plan to catch the west coast's biggest illegal drug supplier, who is the leading suspect in the murder of an anti-drug assemblyman who was gunned down in the desert. Keppler concocts the plan when the suspect disappears and his trail grows cold after several weeks using the concept of "reverse forensics"; however, their plans were kept secret from even their fellow CSI co-workers, sowing their distrust with Keppler and Catherine. Meanwhile, Sara and Greg investigate a heroin addict found dead in her apartment due to blunt force trauma. (Guest starred A Martinez.) Absent: William Petersen (Gil Grissom).
155	14	"Meet Market"	Paris Barclay	Dustin Lee Abraham	February 1, 2007	21.49
Nick and Keppler investigate the possible selling of body parts on the Black Market after they find a charred body of an ex-con in a welding shack with several body parts removed and even replaced with household items such as a plastic pipe and an umbrella. The rest of the team investigates the death of a millionaire's wife, beaten to death with a champagne bottle in her home. Suspicion falls on the husband, who claims he found her after returning home early from a business trip. Meanwhile, Grissom, still away on sabbatical, writes a love letter to Sara, but stops short in mailing it to her. Absent: Robert David Hall (Al Robbins).
156	15	"Law of Gravity"	Richard J. Lewis	Story by : Richard Catalani; Teleplay by : Richard Catalani & Carol Mendelsohn	February 8, 2007	22.52
Keppler finds himself having recurring nightmares about an incident many years ago in New Jersey, which get worse when a friend of his, a retired cop from Trenton (played by Len Cariou) and the father of his late girlfriend comes into town to visit. Soon, the bodies of a New Jersey police officer and a hooker are found shot to death in a hotel room, the left hand of the dead woman cut off. To Keppler's dismay, the one who found the bodies is none other than his friend; he gathers the evidence, but doesn't want the other CSIs to know about it or his whereabouts - yet. Back at the lab, Grissom returns from his sabbatical and learns about the friction caused by Keppler while he was away, and the large box that remains unopened.
157	16	"Monster in the Box"	Jeffrey Hunt	Douglas Petrie & Naren Shankar	February 15, 2007	22.71
Grissom is shocked when he opens the large box sent to him while he was on sabbatical (its contents previewed at the end of Leaving Las Vegas) and finds a miniature crime scene inside, especially as the case of the previous miniatures was supposed to have been closed. Investigation reveals the murder depicted has not yet taken place but is likely to occur soon, so Grissom and the team work to analyze the miniature and find the real location before a tragedy can occur. (Guest starred Kathleen Quinlan.)
158	17	"Fallen Idols"	Christopher Leitch	Marlane Meyer	February 22, 2007	21.78
Grissom and his team are discouraged when they find a pool of blood as they begin investigating the disappearance of a high school basketball star named Ryan and his cheerleader girlfriend. Grissom's quip that the young lovers may have run off to Mexico is soon quashed by the discovery of drops of blood by Ryan's vacant parking spot at the school. After finding a letterman jacket and cheerleading sweater in the field house and a pool of Ryan's blood nearby, the team tries to determine what went awry.
159	18	"Empty Eyes"	Michael Slovis	Allen MacDonald	March 29, 2007	22.71
Six showgirls are murdered in their rented house and Sara is haunted by the dying words of the last victim, as she dies in Sara's arms. The investigation reveals the women's necks were slashed with a knife and that Warrick believes he knows one of the victims; he would also find out that one of them had named his grandmother's neighbor (Ruby Dee) as their next of kin. Also, Greg gets some disturbing information from Grissom about the civil suit filed against him in relation to his killing in self defense of one of the "Fannysmackin" suspects.
160	19	"Big Shots"	Jeff Woolnough	Dustin Lee Abraham	April 5, 2007	21.69
While Grissom, Nick and Greg investigate the murder of a thug gunned down in a limo, they discover that the case not only involves recently-released rapper Drops (Method Man), but also has ties to the brother of the man Greg killed in self-defense in the "Fannysmackin" incident; this especially irritated Undersheriff McKeen, as he viewed that it would not only be detrimental to Greg's case, but would also view the LVPD in a negative light. Meanwhile Catherine and Warrick investigate the death of a woman who was dragged behind a moving vehicle. As both cases are investigated the team discover that they are related.
161	20	"Lab Rats"	Brad Tanenbaum	Story by : Naren Shankar & Sarah Goldfinger; Teleplay by : Sarah Goldfinger	April 12, 2007	22.18
Grissom sends the team out with new cases and goes to spend the evening in autopsy. While he's gone, Hodges takes over his office and assembles a team leading them to believe that Grissom wants them to work on the miniature killer case, when in fact, Hodges was on a lucky spree and wanted it to continue by finding new information about the case. While most of his team eventually quits, Hodges does discover a connection that helps Grissom. Meanwhile in autopsy, Grissom and Robbins hunt down a rat that made a home in a corpse that they were examining.
162	21	"Ending Happy"	Kenneth Fink	Evan Dunsky	April 26, 2007	20.20
A has-been boxer was found dead in a swimming pool at a cheap brothel outside of town. The team must not only determine which one of the prostitutes who detested him committed the murder, but also find out which one of several life-threatening acts enacted against him that night actually killed him. (Guest starred James Whitmore, in his final appearance before his 2009 death.)
163	22	"Leapin' Lizards"	Richard J. Lewis	Story by : Carol Mendelsohn & David Rambo; Teleplay by : David Rambo	May 3, 2007	19.03
During a shootout with the police, a suspect in the kidnapping and possible murder of a blackjack dealer and her husband takes his own life. Searching his ranch, the CSIs find the kidnapping victim's head mounted onto a plaque and her bones buried in the mud in a pig pen. As the investigation continues, it is revealed that the dead suspect and several others connected to him belonged to a strange cult in which it is believed that certain people are secretly intelligent reptilian creatures set on conquering mankind. (Guest starred Ally Sheedy and Julie Hagerty.)
164	23	"The Good, the Bad and the Dominatrix"	Alec Smight	Jacqueline Hoyt	May 10, 2007	18.75
Lady Heather returns when she is found injured after a meeting with a client at a Wild West venue. She was assaulted, but she didn't react in self defense. When Brass and Catherine come back to the crime scene, they find one of the security guards dead. As they continue to investigate, it revealed that Lady Heather was diabetic, and was in a dispute over visitation rights for her granddaughter. Meanwhile, Nick and Warrick investigate when the body of a woman is found on a street; further investigation reveals that she was hit in the head by a car. (Guest starred Joe Penny.)
165	24	"Living Doll"	Kenneth Fink	Naren Shankar & Sarah Goldfinger	May 17, 2007	20.45
The CSIs investigate a woman who was murdered after being electrocuted by a rigged bathroom sink. But in doing so, they find a tiny figure of the victim, but no miniature set accompanying it. An investigation would reveal that the suspect in the "Miniature Murders" was Natalie Davis, a young mentally ill person who draws and creates miniatures for a hobby. Grissom would eventually find her ventriloquist father (Jay Johnson), who would explain her personality through his "dummy". Through an assignment at her temp agency, Natalie posed as a janitor, so she would leave behind her latest miniature set - displaying how Sara would die underneath a wrecked car in the desert. She would be caught and taken in, but she would refuse to divulge Sara's location.
