= CSI: Deadly Intent =

2009 video game

- Developers: Telltale Games; Other Ocean Interactive (DS)
- Publisher: Ubisoft
- Engine: Telltale Tool (consoles and PC)
- Platforms: Microsoft Windows, Xbox 360, Nintendo DS, Wii
- Release: NA: October 20, 2009 (PC); NA: October 27, 2009 (X360, DS & Wii); EU: October 30, 2009 (PC, X360 & DS); AU: November 12, 2009 (Wii); EU: November 13, 2009 (Wii)
- Genre: Adventure
- Mode: Single player

CSI: Deadly Intent is a computer game based on the CSI: Crime Scene Investigation television series. It is the seventh CSI game released, including CSI: Miami and CSI: NY. It was released for Microsoft Windows on October 20, 2009, and for Xbox 360, Nintendo DS and Wii on October 27, 2009.

The game corresponds with the 9th season of the television series and includes the characters of Raymond Langston and Riley Adams.

Cast members of the popular TV show including Laurence Fishburne, George Eads, Paul Guilfoyle, Eric Szmanda, Lauren Lee Smith, and Robert David Hall reprised their roles for the videogame and recorded in Los Angeles with voice director Timothy Cubbison.

The Nintendo DS version of this game is called CSI: Deadly Intent - The Hidden Cases and was developed by Other Ocean. It includes four original cases created exclusively for that platform.

== The Cases ==
=== Case 1: Broken Hearted ===
In case 1, an army wife named Lynn Bowder is found murdered in a hotel room, wearing a wedding dress. Your partner in this case is Nick Stokes. The suspects are a Vegas visitor named Airam Dominguez, the night manager of the hotel, Charles Steer, and the victim's old friend, Kathy Burd. It turns out that Kathy and Lynn were secretly in love, but when Lynn fell for Airam instead, Kathy killed her in a jealous rage and had Charles help her cover it up.

=== Case 2: Coulda Been A Contender ===
A referee named Rick Shimada was found dead in the fighting ring. Your partner in this case is Greg Sanders. The suspects are an angry fighter named Hank Hackett, a mysterious ring girl named Tina Allens, and the league owner, Horace Willingham. Suspect Hank Hackett is murdered halfway through the investigation, making it a double homicide. Horace originally confesses to the murders, but it is discovered that Tina murdered Rick because he planned to expose the league for rigging matches, then killed Hank and framed him by making his death look like a suicide.

=== Case 3: Last Gasp ===
A female TV host named Clarinda Jackson was found drowned to death in a rehab center spa. Your partner in this case is Dr. Raymond Langston. The suspects are the victim's lover, Steven Tampson, her husband, Ernest Goldwasser, and a TV rival named Jack Shell. It is discovered that Steven never had any feelings for Clarinda, but she was madly in love with him, and he only began their relationship to humor her and to ruin her marriage with her husband, as he blamed the couple for his own divorce. He kills her after she confesses she loves him.

=== Case 4: Extinguished ===
A famous fire-breather named Andrew Levesque was found dead. Your partner in this case is Riley Adams. According to the autopsy report, the victim was already dying of cancer and it seems the victim was abusive and violent. The suspects are the victim's landlord, Dr. Vincente Manoto, his wife, Ardell Levesque, who recently gave birth to their daughter, and his 18-year-old stepson, Lyle Fitzer. The murderer turns out to be Lyle, as his stepfather did nothing to support their family and Lyle had to step up in order for them to survive, which soon caused his anger toward Andrew to reach the breaking point.

=== Case 5: Crime Scene Impersonator ===
A female impersonator named Wallace Bieganowski under the alias of Miss A was found dead in a nightclub. Your partner in this last case is Catherine Willows. The victim was identified as a superstar but other identification turns out to be the victim's friend and manager. This murder was staged to look like the work of a serial killer from 1975. This killer was known as the Barbor Street Boozer. He got this name because he tied his victims down and poured whiskey down their throats until they died of alcohol poisoning. The suspects are the superstar known as Marcelle (real name: Floyd Collister), a homeless man named Gary Beaumont, and the detective who worked the case back in 1975, Lieutenant Juarice Briggs. At the end of the game, you solve a celebrity murder and a cold case; Floyd was the Boozer, and one of his victims was close to Juarice, making the case very personal for her. This in turn led to Juarice killing Wallace after she mistook him for Floyd.

== CSI: Deadly Intent: The Hidden Cases ==
=== Case 1: Don't Try This At Home ===
At the set of the movie "Diamond Devils", an explosion occurs and a dead extra for the set falls with it.

"An unexpected explosion rocks a movie set with far too many accidents."

You work with Ray Langston.

=== Case 2: Glass Jaw ===
The designer of a new casino is found dead on top of a sword on the casino's opening.

"The opening of Glass Works Casino is interrupted by a strange death."

You work with Nick Stokes and Catherine Willows.

=== Case 3: Boys With Toys ===
An air gun fight ends with a man killed with a real one.

"Find out who brought a gun to an air gun fight."

You work with Greg Sanders.

=== Case 4: Of Cases Past ===
Unfortunately for you, your last suspect was found poisoned and you see that a therapist facility connects the culprits of your cases.

"Discover the shocking truth behind the murder of a familiar face."

You work with Catherine Willows and Riley Adams.

== Reception ==
Reception

Aggregate score
Aggregator	Score			
Aggregator	DS	PC	Wii	Xbox 360
Metacritic	58/100	46/100	80/100	51/100

Review scores
Publication	Score			
Publication	DS	PC	Wii	Xbox 360
Adventure Gamers	2/5	2/5	N/A	N/A
GameZone	N/A	N/A	8/10	N/A
IGN	7.5/10	N/A	N/A	N/A
Official Xbox Magazine (UK)	N/A	N/A	N/A	4/10
Official Xbox Magazine (US)	N/A	N/A	N/A	4.5/10

The game was met with positive to mixed reception. GameRankings and Metacritic gave it 80% and 80 out of 100 for the Wii version; 64% and 46 out of 100 for the PC version; 57% and 51 out of 100 for the Xbox 360 version; and 40% and 58 out of 100 for the DS version.
