= CSI: Trilogy =

Series of CSI franchise crossover episodes

- CSI crossover event

Part 1: CSI: Miami
- Episode title: "Bone Voyage"
- Episode no.: Season 8 Episode 7
- Directed by: Sam Hill
- Written by: Barry O'Brien
- Original air date: November 9, 2009

Episode chronology
← Previous "Dude, Where's My Groom?"	Next → "Point of Impact"
- CSI: Miami season 8

Part 2: CSI: NY
- Episode title: "Hammer Down"
- Episode no.: Season 6 Episode 7
- Directed by: Scott Lautanen
- Written by: Peter M. Lenkov; Pam Veasey
- Original air date: November 11, 2009

Episode chronology
← Previous "It Happened to Me"	Next → "Cuckoo's Nest"
- CSI: NY season 6

Part 3: CSI: Crime Scene Investigation
- Episode title: "The Lost Girls"
- Episode no.: Season 10; Episode 7
- Directed by: Alec Smight
- Written by: David Weddle; Bradley Thompson
- Original air date: November 12, 2009

Episode chronology
← Previous "Death & The Maiden"	Next → "Lover's Lanes"
- CSI: Crime Scene Investigation season 10

"CSI: Trilogy" is a three-part crossover of the American police procedural television franchise CSI that aired on CBS from November 9 to 12, 2009. The seventh episodes of the 2009–2010 season had continuing stories with Laurence Fishburne as Dr. Raymond Langston in all three. The episodes are the CSI: Miami episode "Bone Voyage" broadcast on November 9, the CSI: NY episode "Hammer Down" broadcast on November 11, and the CSI: Crime Scene Investigation episode "The Lost Girls" broadcast on November 12. In the story, Raymond's search for a lost girl turns into a race as he discovers she is part of a black market human trafficking ring and has been forced to become a surrogate mother. As she travels from Miami to New York to Las Vegas, he works with the other CSIs to find her.

== Plot ==
=== Part 1: CSI: Miami – 8.07 – "Bone Voyage" ===
In Miami, Lt. Horatio Caine overhears a woman whose daughter, Ashley Tanner, is missing. Her car is found in the Everglades where the team searches the trees and swamps until they find a severed arm and leg. They identify the arm as that of Ashley's, but the leg is from an unidentified Jane Doe and is covered by radioactive sand, which is only found in Las Vegas. Soon, they get a lead when they discover that Ashley's credit card had recently been used, and their trail leads them to another girl, Madeline Briggs, who says she found the card on the side of a highway. In the meantime, Horatio calls Dr. Ray Langston, who deduces that the severed leg belongs to his own investigation of a missing girl, Samantha Matthews. Ray travels to Miami, where he and Horatio join forces to discover who is responsible for killing the females. To their shock, they discover that both women were seduced by the promise of making a living through modeling and were exposed to prostitution. What is unexpected is the fact that the girls were dismembered by two different men: a professional "rock star" butcher and a model manager-turned-pimp who was associated with Ashley. As it turns out, a mysterious crime syndicate working outside Miami called the "Zetas" had been funding these men, which leads Ray and Horatio to believe that this case is much bigger than they imagined.

=== Part 2: CSI: NY – 6.07 – "Hammer Down" ===
In New York City an accident on an interstate highway involving a drunk driver and a big rig truck takes a turn for the worse when Det. Don Flack finds a metal drum in the cargo area of the truck with a dead woman's body inside. Det. Mac Taylor finds a mobile dungeon in the sleeper compartment of the truck and discovers that another woman, Madeline Briggs (the woman missing from Miami), was in the sleeper when the accident occurred. Now both Casey (the truck driver) and Madeline have disappeared after the accident when Casey hijacks a driver. When Dr. Sid Hammerback examines the female victim in the metal drum, he notices an organ is missing. The team theorizes that the victim was kidnapped and dissected for her liver, which was sold on the black market. Dr. Ray Langston of the Las Vegas crime lab, having recently helped Horatio Caine arrest two killers in Miami, arrives in New York to help Mac and his team find Madeline and stop the Zetas' human trafficking network. When urine found in the sleeper of the truck is examined, it is discovered that Madeline is pregnant. Mac and Ray speculate she is a forced surrogate and Casey might sell her into prostitution until she gives birth. The team tracks the suspect to a pharmacy, where they lose him in a chase but find soil samples in his car. A match is found with the soil samples found earlier, and Mac, Ray and the team head to the location. They do not find Madeline, but they do find Casey, and a gunfight ensues, ending with Casey's arrest. Casey gives Mac and Ray little information. He admits that he gave Madeline to another trafficker, and she is revealed to be in the sleeper compartment of another big rig truck heading to Las Vegas. (CSI: Miami's Dave Benton (Wes Ramsey) appears briefly during a videoconference.)

=== Part 3: CSI: Crime Scene Investigation – 10.07 – "The Lost Girls" ===
Ray Langston is back in Las Vegas and still searching for Madeline Briggs after trying to find her in Miami and New York. At the same time, a local weather girl, Deedee, is found dead outside the Tangiers Hotel & Casino, dressed as a prostitute. When the team examines her, they discover Madeline's blood on Deedee's earring and an equally important tattoo. They theorize that Deedee and Madeline may have lived in the same place and shared the same pimp, so they go to a nightclub and spot another prostitute, Diane, with the same tattoo as Deedee. They arrest her on a bogus charge but get a lead when she calls her pimp from the station. The team follows her to a house where they see one of the pimps, Anthony Samuels, wearing the other earring seen on Madeline. Searching the house, Ray finds a bloody mattress and a lock box filled with money, casino chips and driver's licenses, including Deedee's. In the house, the team finds a badly beaten Diane. when they examine her, they find another tattoo covered over by Anthony. This leads the team to believe she used to belong to another pimp, Dmitri Sadesky, a Russian professor at nearby Western Las Vegas University (WLVU). Ray studies the mattress and finds definite matches to the blood of both Madeline and her unborn child. In the meantime, Catherine Willows reviews the security footage from the Tangiers to determine what really happened to Deedee. Catherine discovers that Diane is the murderer; Diane was jealous that Anthony preferred Deedee to her. Dmitri is caught with evidence in his car from the leg Ray and Horatio Caine found in Miami, and more dead women's bodies are found in the desert. With no other choice, Dmitri helps the team take down the human trafficking ring and admits he did have Madeline, but let her go because she was useless to him. Ray receives messages from Mac and Horatio; both have made crackdowns on the trafficking ring. Ray finds a way to send Madeline a text message saying her mother loves her in spite of everything that has happened. The message reaches Madeline, and she meets Ray outside the crime lab.

== Cast ==
Character	Portrayed by	Occupation	Episodes		
Character	Portrayed by	Occupation	Miami	NY	CSI
Lieutenant Horatio Caine	David Caruso	CSI Level 3 Supervisor; MDPD Crime Lab Director			
Detective Calleigh Duquesne	Emily Procter	CSI Level 3 Assistant Supervisor			
Detective Ryan Wolfe	Jonathan Togo	CSI Level 3			
Sergeant Frank Tripp	Rex Linn	Robbery-Homicide Division Detective			
Officer Natalia Boa Vista	Eva LaRue	CSI Level 2			
Officer Walter Simmons	Omar Benson Miller	CSI Level 1			
Detective Jesse Cardoza	Eddie Cibrian	CSI Level 2			
Detective Mac Taylor	Gary Sinise	CSI Level 3 Supervisor; NYPD Crime Lab Director			
Detective Stella Bonasera	Melina Kanakaredes	CSI Level 3 Assistant Supervisor			
Detective Danny Messer	Carmine Giovinazzo	CSI Level 3			
Detective Lindsay Monroe	Anna Belknap	CSI Level 3			
Dr. Sheldon Hawkes	Hill Harper	CSI Level 2			
Dr. Sid Hammerback	Robert Joy	Chief Medical Examiner			
Adam Ross	A. J. Buckley	Lab Technician			
Detective Don Flack	Eddie Cahill	Homicide Detective			
Dr. Raymond Langston	Laurence Fishburne	CSI Level 2			
Catherine Willows	Marg Helgenberger	CSI Level 3 Supervisor			
Nick Stokes	George Eads	CSI Level 3 Assistant Supervisor			
Greg Sanders	Eric Szmanda	CSI Level 3			
Dr. Al Robbins	Robert David Hall	Chief Medical Examiner			
David Hodges	Wallace Langham	Trace Technician			
Wendy Simms	Liz Vassey	DNA Technician			
David Phillips	David Berman	Assistant Medical Examiner			
Captain Jim Brass	Paul Guilfoyle	Homicide Detective			

== Viewership ==
Episode	US viewers (millions)
Bone Voyage	14.38
Hammer Down	14.51
The Lost Girls	17.38

== Episode titles ==
Original title	UK title	Netherlands title^{*}
Bone Voyage	CSI Trilogy: Miami	CSI: Crossover
Hammer Down	CSI Trilogy: New York	CSI: Crossover
The Lost Girls	CSI Trilogy: Vegas	CSI: Crossover

^{*}Aired as a single 2 ½ hour special

== DVD releases ==
All three episodes of the Trilogy are included on CSI: Miami - The Eighth Season DVD, CSI: NY - The Sixth Season DVD, and CSI - The Tenth Season DVD, along with a special feature entitled Leaving Las Vegas: Langston Heads East on all three releases. Also included on the DVDs are Bear Necessities on the Miami release, East Coast Heroes on the NY release, and Getting Lost on the Vegas release.

The trilogy was released with Region 2 encoding in France on January 5, 2011, and in Japan on February 25, 2011. It was released on both DVD and Blu-ray Disc.
