= CSI: NY (video game) =

2008 video game

CSI: NY – The Game
- Developer: Legacy Interactive (Note: Programming handled by Mystery Studio.)
- Publisher: Ubisoft (Note: Mobile port published by Gameloft.)
- Designers: Craig Brannon; Ryan Modjeski; David Shelley
- Programmer: Diego Soler
- Artist: Jesus Uriarte
- Composer: Bill Brown
- Platforms: Windows, Mac OS X, mobile
- Release: Windows: NA: November 18, 2008; EU: January 30, 2009; Mac OS X: WW: April 27, 2009; Mobile phone: US: March 19, 2008
- Genre: Adventure
- Mode: Single-player

CSI: NY – The Game is a video game based on the CSI: NY television series. This is the sixth CSI game released, and the only one for CSI: NY.

As with the previous CSI games, there are five cases to work on. However, the game has taken a drastic graphical change, opting for a stylised 2D cartoon look, instead of the rendered 3D graphics of previous games in the CSI franchise. The game will allow you to control a CSI (Mac or Stella) and solve cases, collect evidence and solve puzzles. You will also be able to interrogate suspects with branching dialogue options, and depending on your tone or line of questioning you may find the suspects refuse to co-operate, or tell you everything you need to know.

This is Legacy Interactive's first CSI game. They previously created the Law & Order video games.

As of April 2009, Ubisoft released the final case ("Derailed"). This case requires game patch 1.01 (it can be installed if the PC has an active internet connection). Mac Taylor becomes the prime suspect on the case when his DNA is discovered all over the body of a dead man.

Cast members of the popular TV show including Gary Sinise, Melina Kanakaredes, Carmine Giovinazzo, Hill Harper, Eddie Cahill, Anna Belknap, Robert Joy, and A. J. Buckley reprised their roles for the video game and recorded in Los Angeles with voice director Timothy Cubbison.

== Cases ==
=== Case 1 – Downward Spiral ===
A man fell from the top of a building – was it homicide or was it suicide? The fact that he has acquired wings through plastic surgery only adds to the unnatural aspects. Suspects include his boss, a tattoo parlor girl, and the doctor who gave him surgery. It is eventually discovered he got the wings because he wanted to show his boss his true daredevil nature and his boss shoved him out the window during the ensuing argument. Mac Taylor is the playable character in this case.

=== Case 2 – Just Desserts ===
An infamous food critic is found dead in a restaurant. Suspects include the general manager who had an affair with the victim, a chef who was criticized for a bad review from the victim, and another chef who made him meet with a mobster. It eventually comes out that he was poisoned by the chef he humiliated before he went to the restaurant where he was found. Stella Bonasera is the playable character in this case.

Ferris Wheel at Coney Island Boardwalk

=== Case 3 – Off the Mark ===
One woman is found dead in a theater used for magic and another at a construction site. Suspects include the two acts that were performing, a construction worker, and an amusement park worker. Is this the work of a serial killer? No, as in the end the construction worker turns out to be the killer because he'd killed one of his workers shortly after the project started, and the project was close to being called off, which would have led to the body's discovery. Stella Bonasera is the playable character in this case.

=== Case 4 – Hillridge Confidential ===
A young girl was killed during her live session on the Internet. The killer wanted to stop the threats going around the school and stop her from telling the killer's secret. Suspects include the doorman, a brother and sister, and the headmaster. The secret turns out to be that the headmaster was gay and he killed the girl in order to keep the information from destroying his life. Mac Taylor is the playable character in this case.

=== Case 5 – Derailed ===
Mac works on a frozen body recovered in a metro station. Unfortunately for him, the clues point to him as a suspect, as the victim was a rapist Mac couldn't throw in jail many years ago. Suspects include a mother who wanted Mac to stay away from her daughter, the daughter whom the victim attacked, and a homeless man who lives in the subway. In the end, the mother turns out to be the killer as she wanted revenge on both the man who hurt her daughter and the cop who couldn't convict him. Mac Taylor is the playable character in this case.

== Reception ==
Reception

Aggregate scores
Aggregator	Score
GameRankings	53.25%
Metacritic	53/100

Review scores
Publication	Score
Adventure Gamers	2.5/5
GameZone	5.3/10
IGN	5.8/10

The game was met with very mixed reception upon release, as GameRankings gave it a score of 53.25%, while Metacritic gave it 53 out of 100.
