= Gary Dourdan =

American actor

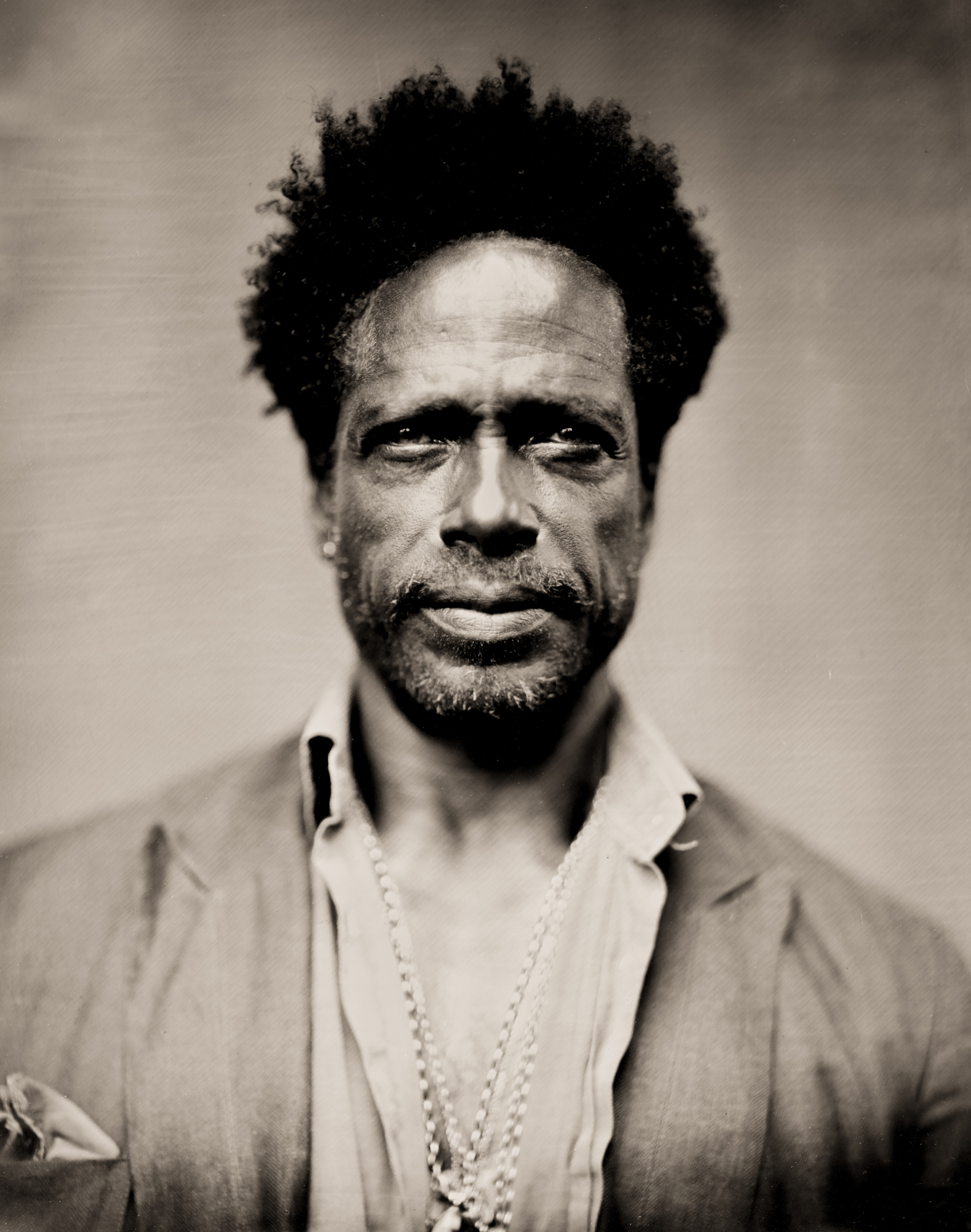
- Dourdan in August 2023
- Born: Gary Robert Durdin; December 11, 1966 (age 59); Philadelphia, Pennsylvania, U.S.
- Occupation: Actor
- Years active: 1991–present
- Known for: Warrick Brown on CSI: Crime Scene Investigation
- Spouse: Roshumba Williams (m. 1992; div. 1994)
- Partner(s): Cynthia Hadden; Jennifer Sutton (1995–2000)
- Children: 2

Gary Dourdan (born Gary Robert Durdin: December 11, 1966) is an American actor. He is known for portraying Warrick Brown on the television series CSI: Crime Scene Investigation, Shazza Zulu on the television series A Different World and Mickey Monroe in crime thriller Righteous Villains.

== Early life ==
Dourdan was born Gary Robert Durdin in Philadelphia, Pennsylvania, the son of Sandy, a teacher and fashion designer, and Robert Durdin, an entrepreneur and agent for jazz musicians. Dourdan is the fourth of five children. When he was six, his 21-year-old brother Darryl died after falling from a balcony in Haiti while "doing research on the family lineage." The case remains unsolved.

== Career ==
Dourdan played in several bands in New York City in the early 1990s and acted in regional theatre in the New York metropolitan area. He acted in music videos, including playing Janet Jackson's love interest in the video for her 1993 hit "Again", and had a cameo in the music video "Move the Crowd" by Eric B. & Rakim. Debbie Allen cast him as Shazza Zulu on A Different World, based on a tape of him in an avant-garde play. In 1996, Dourdan appeared in the Lois & Clark: The New Adventures of Superman episode "Never on Sunday" playing Ziggy, an assistant to Baron Sunday. In 1997, he played Christie, the first mate and second in command of the spaceship Betty in the film Alien Resurrection. He also appeared in the films Playing God and Thursday, and on television, he starred in the Dick Wolf production Swift Justice and played a recurring role on the series Soul Food. Dourdan joined hip-hop artist DMC (of Run–D.M.C.) onstage at the Live 8 concert in Barrie, Ontario, and sang alongside Macy Gray at the 2005 Emmy Awards. He is an alternative musician and a record producer.

In 2007, he played the character Cameron, the boyfriend of Rowena Price (Halle Berry), in the film Perfect Stranger.

Dourdan's most popular role was as a cast member of the series CSI, which debuted on October 6, 2000. He played analyst Warrick Brown, who has a checkered past fraught with gambling problems. By working in Las Vegas, the character uses his personal experiences to help his career.

In 2008, there was media speculation surrounding Dourdan's CSI contract negotiations with CBS. The parties could not reach a resolution, and as a result, his contract was not renewed. It was reported on April 14, 2008, that Dourdan was leaving the show. In the Season 8 finale, Dourdan's character was shot and left for dead at the episode's end. The Season 9 premiere revealed Dourdan's character dying in the arms of his colleague and friend Gil Grissom.

After leaving CSI, he took recurring roles as Stephan in the series Christine, and Sheldon DeWitt in the series Being Mary Jane.

He made his Broadway debut in Hadestown as Hades on March 3, 2026. His run as Hades has concluded as of August 30, 2026.

== Personal life ==
Dourdan has African-American, Native American, Franco-Haitian (Haiti), Jewish, Irish, and Scottish ancestry. He married model Roshumba Williams in 1992; they divorced two years later. He has two children: a son with Cynthia Hadden and a daughter with Jennifer Sutton, whom Dourdan dated from 1995 to 2000.

Dourdan collects classic cars and was featured on Season 1, Episode 3, of Street Customs.

=== Legal issues ===
In 2008, Dourdan was arrested for possession of cocaine and ecstasy. A third charge, possession of heroin, was dropped. Despite rumors, the drug charges had nothing to do with his departure from CSI, as the contract negotiations had already concluded and he had finished filming the last of his scenes before the incident. In July 2011, after crashing his car, Dourdan was arrested but charges were dropped for drug possession (oxycodone). He was, however, charged with possession of drug paraphernalia. In November 2011, he was arrested for felony battery after breaking his girlfriend's nose and placed on five years' probation. He was also ordered to attend weeks of domestic violence counseling and to stay away from the victim for five years. Dourdan filed for bankruptcy in August 2012, owing roughly $1.7 million to creditors.

== Filmography ==
=== Film ===
| Year | Title | Role | Notes |
|---|---|---|---|
| 1992 | The Good Fight | Elijah | Television film |
| 1993 | Weekend at Bernie's II | Cartel Man #2 | |
| 1994 | The Paper | Copy Guy | |
| 1994 | Keys | Loot | Television film |
| 1996 | Sunset Park | Dreadlock Guy | |
| 1997 | Playing God | Yates | |
| 1997 | Alien Resurrection | Christie | |
| 1997 | Fool's Paradise | Derek | |
| 1997 | Get That Number | James | Short |
| 1998 | Scar City | Sergeant Dan Creedy | |
| 1998 | Thursday | Ballpean | |
| 1999 | The Weekend | Theirry | |
| 1999 | New Jersey Turnpikes | - | |
| 1999 | Rendezvous | Jeff Nelson | Television film |
| 2000 | King of the World | Malcolm X | Television film |
| 2000 | Trois | Jermaine Davis | |
| 2000 | Dancing in September | - | |
| 2001 | Impostor | Captain Burke | |
| 2006 | 60 Seconds of Distance | Dylan | Short |
| 2007 | Perfect Stranger | Cameron | |
| 2007 | Black August | George L. Jackson | |
| 2008 | Batman: Gotham Knight | Crispus Allen | Voice, direct-to-video |
| 2009 | Fire! | Phil May | |
| 2009 | The Magnificent Cooly-T | Dominick | |
| 2011 | Jumping the Broom | Chef | |
| 2012 | The Woods | Dylan Banks | |
| 2013 | Five Thirteen | Clyde | |
| 2013 | The Last Letter | George | |
| 2014 | Cobayas: Human Test | Eric | Short |
| 2014 | With You | Ruben Haze | Short |
| 2015 | Mysterious Ways | Mozart | |
| 2015 | For the Love of Ruth | Braxton | |
| 2015 | Reversion | Ayden | |
| 2016 | Love Under New Management: The Miki Howard Story | Augie | |
| 2017 | Media | Jabbar Randolph | Television film |
| 2017 | Guns Guitars and a Badge.. | Romeo | |
| 2018 | All She Wrote | Aaron | |
| 2018 | Kinky | Greenland | |
| 2020 | Influence | Perk | |
| 2020 | Righteous Villains | Mickey Monroe | |
| 2021 | Redemption Day | Brad Paxton | |
| 2022 | The Moderator | Agent Richard Bourdeau | |
| 2022 | Rolling Into Christmas | Joe Franks | Television film |
| 2023 | Heaven Sent | Jeff | |
| 2024 | Albany Road | Phil | |
| 2024 | Zero | Daniel | |
| 2025 | The Lost Princess | Nassim Ikken | |

=== Television ===
| Year | Title | Role | Notes |
|---|---|---|---|
| 1991–1992 | A Different World | Shazza Zulu | Guest: season 4, recurring cast: seasons 5-6 |
| 1993 | Laurel Avenue | Anthony | Episode: "Part I & II" |
| 1994 | New York Undercover | Trey King | Episode: "To Protect and Serve" |
| 1995 | The Office | Bobby Harold | Main cast |
| 1996 | Lois & Clark: New Adventures of Superman | Ziggy | Episode: "Never on Sunday" |
| 1996 | Swift Justice | Randall Patterson | Main cast |
| 1998 | Sins of the City | - | Episode: "Sins of the City" |
| 1999 | Seven Days | Sergeant Mohmand | Episode: "Daddy's Girl" |
| 1999–2000 | Beggars and Choosers | Julius Henry | 2 episodes |
| 2000–2001 | Soul Food | Jack Van Adams | Recurring cast: season 1, guest: season 2 |
| 2000–2008 | CSI: Crime Scene Investigation | Warrick Brown | Main cast: seasons 1-8, guest: Season 9 |
| 2002 | Fillmore! | Ken Fillmore | Voice, episode: "Cry, the Beloved Mascot" |
| 2002 | Lyric Cafe | Himself | Host |
| 2005 | Kim Possible | Dash DaMont | Voice, episode: "Team Impossible" |
| 2012 | Christine | Stephan | Recurring cast |
| 2013 | Belle's | - | Episode: "Runaway Bride" |
| 2013 | Mistresses | Anthony Newsome | Recurring cast: Season 1 |
| 2014 | Glee | D'Shawn | Episode: "The Back-Up Plan" |
| 2015 | Being Mary Jane | Sheldon | Recurring cast: Season 2 |
| 2018 | Power | Charles Hamilton | Episode: "When This Is Over" |
| 2019 | The Family Business | Trent | 2 episodes |
| 2021 | First Wives Club | Dr. Malcolm Reynard | Recurring cast: Season 2 |
| 2021 | The Last O.G. | Bricks | Episode: "The First Hump is the Hardest" |
| 2023 | And Just Like That... | Toussaint | 2 episodes |

=== Music videos ===
| Year | Title | Artist |
|---|---|---|
| 1987 | "Move the Crowd" | Eric B. & Rakim |
| 1993 | "Judgment Night" | Biohazard & Onyx |
| 1993 | "Again" | Janet Jackson |
| 2002 | "Soulful Energy Xchange" | Wanted |
| 2004 | "What's Your Number?" | Cypress Hill featuring Tim Armstrong |

=== Video games ===
| Year | Title | Voice role |
|---|---|---|
| 2000 | Alien: Resurrection | Christie |
| 2003 | CSI: Crime Scene Investigation | Warrick Brown |
| 2004 | CSI: Dark Motives | Warrick Brown |
| 2006 | CSI: 3 Dimensions of Murder | Warrick Brown |
| 2007 | CSI: Hard Evidence | Warrick Brown |

== Awards and nominations ==
| Association | Year | Category | Title | Result |
|---|---|---|---|---|
| NAACP Image Awards | 2003 | Outstanding Supporting Actor in a Drama Series | CSI: Crime Scene Investigation | Won |
| NAACP Image Awards | 2004 | Outstanding Actor in a Drama Series | CSI: Crime Scene Investigation | Nominated |
| NAACP Image Awards | 2005 | Outstanding Actor in a Drama Series | CSI: Crime Scene Investigation | Nominated |
| NAACP Image Awards | 2006 | Outstanding Supporting Actor in a Drama Series | CSI: Crime Scene Investigation | Won |
| NAACP Image Awards | 2007 | Outstanding Supporting Actor in a Drama Series | CSI: Crime Scene Investigation | Nominated |
| Screen Actors Guild Awards | 2002 | Outstanding Performance by an Ensemble in a Drama Series | CSI: Crime Scene Investigation | Nominated |
| Screen Actors Guild Awards | 2003 | Outstanding Performance by an Ensemble in a Drama Series | CSI: Crime Scene Investigation | Nominated |
| Screen Actors Guild Awards | 2004 | Outstanding Performance by an Ensemble in a Drama Series | CSI: Crime Scene Investigation | Nominated |
| Screen Actors Guild Awards | 2005 | Outstanding Performance by an Ensemble in a Drama Series | CSI: Crime Scene Investigation | Won |
| Seattle International Film Festival | 2000 | Citation of Excellence for Ensemble Cast Performance | The Weekend | Won |
| South East European Film Festival | 2018 | Best Actor | All She Wrote | Won |
