= Robert David Hall =

American actor

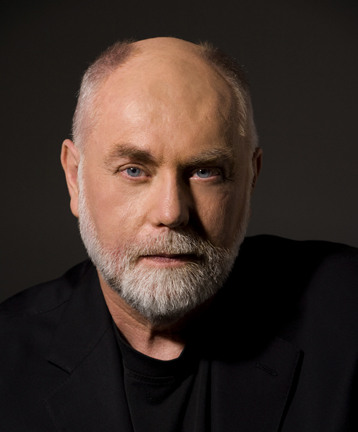
- Hall in 2007
- Education: Tustin High School; UCLA
- Occupation: Actor
- Years active: 1983–present

Robert David Hall is an American actor, best known for his role as coroner Dr. Albert Robbins, M.D. on the television show CSI: Crime Scene Investigation.

== Early life ==
Hall attended Tustin High School in California and went on to graduate from UCLA in 1971 with a degree in English literature. Hall is a former professional musician and accomplished guitarist, and is also proficient on piano, percussion and mandolin. For several years he was a high-profile radio DJ in Los Angeles. His musical talent has been alluded to in CSI: Crime Scene Investigation several times, as his character Dr. Al Robbins would sometimes sing while performing the autopsy or with Gil Grissom when the latter came to the morgue to collect evidence. He has also done extensive voice work on television commercials and cartoons.

In 1978, Hall was critically injured after being involved in a car crash. An 18-wheeler truck struck and crushed his car. The crash also caused the gasoline tank of the car to explode, causing burns over 65% of his body. He almost died in the crash; both of his legs were amputated afterwards. Hall now comfortably uses prosthetic limbs, allowing for personal mobility. Several of his characters, including his CSI character, have openly shared this disability. He is a prominent advocate for disabled Americans.

== Life and career ==
In addition to starring on CSI: Crime Scene Investigation, Hall has appeared in such films as Starship Troopers and The Negotiator and has made guest appearances in a number of TV programs including The West Wing and L.A. Law. He also furnishes the narration on CourtTV's documentary series North Mission Road. Currently, Hall is working on the short thriller "The Roymann Closure in the Netherlands", written by writer/director David Grifhorst and executive producer Jop Douma.

== Filmography ==
=== Film ===
Year	Title	Role	Notes
1983	Deal of the Century	Rick Penido	
1985	Here Comes the Littles	Dinky Little	Voice
1991	Class Action	Steven Kellen	
1993	Once Upon a Forest	Truck Driver	Voice
1993	Dream Lover	Dr. Sheen	
1997	Starship Troopers	Recruiting Sergeant	
1998	The Negotiator	Cale Wangro	
2001	Shattering Images	Nicole's Dad	Short film
2002	My Father's House	The Man On Crutches	
2004	The Eavesdropper	I.R.B. Board Chairman	
2007	Legs	Roosevelt Garland	Short film
2007	The Gene Generation	Abraham	
2008	The Roymann Closure	unknown	Short film
2013	The Wrong Woman	Judge Wallace	
2015	Rock Story	Congressman Connelly	
2016	Diffability Hollywood	Himself	Documentary
2018	Major Arcana	Gene	Short film
TBR	Aaah! Roach!	President Kozlow	Post-production

=== Television ===
Year	Title	Role	Notes
1983–1985	The Littles	Dinky Little, Mr. Bigg	Voice, 29 episodes
1984	G.I. Joe: The Revenge of Cobra	Colonel Sharp	Voice, 2 episodes
1985	G.I. Joe: A Real American Hero	Colonel Sharp	Voice, 8 episodes
1986	ABC Weekend Specials	Dinky Little	Voice, episode: "Liberty and the Littles"
1989	Highway to Heaven	Wayne Secrest	Episode: "The Squeaky Wheel"
1991–1993	Life Goes On	Mr. Mott	6 episodes; recurring role
1991–1993	L.A. Law	Judge Myron Swaybill	3 episodes; recurring role
1992	Mann & Machine	Dave Murphy	Episode: "Prototype"
1992	Batman: The Animated Series	Additional voices	Episode: "Heart of Ice"
1992–1994	Beverly Hills, 90210	The Teacher/Beggar	3 episodes; recurring role
1994	Love & War	Doug	Episode: "The Squeaky Wheel"
1996	Andersonville	Samson	Television film
1996	High Incident	Dominic	2 episodes
1997	Prison of Secrets	Judge	Television film
1997	Brooklyn South	John Keough	Episode: "Clown Without Pity"
1997	Party of Five	Bureaucrat	Episode: "Adjustments"
1997–1999	The Sylvester & Tweety Mysteries	Dr. Kaytwo, Auctioneer	Voice, 2 episodes
1997–2000	Superman: The Animated Series	Spokesman, Reporter, News Anchor	Voice, 3 episodes
1998	Promised Land	Edward Brogan	Episode: "Purple Heart"
1998	The New Batman Adventures	Reporter	Voice, episode: "Mean Seasons"
1999	Touched by an Angel	Harry	Episode: "Fool of Love"
1999–2001	The Practice	Judge Bradley Michaelson	4 episodes; recurring role
2000	The West Wing	David Nessler	Episode: "Celestial Navigation"
2000	The Burkittville 7	David Hooper	Television Short
2000	Batman Beyond	Fulton	Voice, episode: "Speak No Evil"
2000–2015	CSI: Crime Scene Investigation	Chief Medical Examiner Dr. Albert "Al" Robbins	Series regular; 287 episodes (season 3–15); Recurring role; 38 episodes (season 1–2)
2001	Family Law	Judge	2 episodes
2002	The Zeta Project	Thad	Voice, episode: "Eye of the Storm"
2003	Static Shock	Pilot	Voice, episode: "She-Bang"
2006	North Mission Road	Narrator	Episode: "From the Ashes"
2006	Avatar: The Last Airbender	Additional voices	Episode: "Appa's Lost Days"
2007	The Batman	Pilot	Voice, episode: "Artifacts"
2007	Ben 10: Secret of the Omnitrix	Azmuth	Voice, television film
2008–2009	Ben 10: Alien Force	Highbreed Guard, Forever Knight #3, Counterman	Voice, 3 episodes
2012	Ben 10: Destroy All Aliens	Azmuth	Voice, television film
2013	The Wrong Woman	Judge Wallace	Television film
2015	CSI: Immortality	Al Robbins	Television film
2017	sunsaneLand	Mr. Tulchinsky	Episode: "Mr. Tulchinsky"

=== Video games ===
Year	Title	Role	Notes
2003	CSI: Crime Scene Investigation	Chief Medical Examiner Dr. Albert "Al" Robbins	
2004	CSI: Crime Scene Investigation – Dark Motives	Chief Medical Examiner Dr. Albert "Al" Robbins	
2005	ER: The Game	Dr. VanDeer	
2006	CSI: 3 Dimensions of Murder	Dr. Al Robbins	
2007	CSI: Crime Scene Investigation – Hard Evidence	Al Robbins	
2009	CSI: Crime Scene Investigation – Deadly Intent	Dr. Al Robbins	
2010	CSI: Fatal Conspiracy	Dr. Al Robbins	

== Awards and nominations ==
Year	Title	Accolade	Category	Results
2002	CSI: Crime Scene Investigation	Screen Actors Guild Award	Outstanding Performance by an Ensemble in a Drama Series	Nominated
2003	CSI: Crime Scene Investigation	Screen Actors Guild Award	Outstanding Performance by an Ensemble in a Drama Series	Nominated
2004	CSI: Crime Scene Investigation	Screen Actors Guild Award	Outstanding Performance by an Ensemble in a Drama Series	Nominated
2005	CSI: Crime Scene Investigation	Screen Actors Guild Award	Outstanding Performance by an Ensemble in a Drama Series	Won

== Discography ==
- 2010: Things they don't teach you in school, CD album:

- Kick It to the Side of the Road (Robert David Hall)
- Wondering Where You Are (Robert David Hall)
- Things They Don't Teach You in School (Robert David Hall)
- It Just Is (Robert David Hall)
- (Keep On) Pushin' It Through (Chris Wall/Robert David Hall)
- One Door Closes (Robert David Hall/Chris Wall)
- Wishes (Robert David Hall)
- For Judy (Robert David Hall)
- I Feel Like Hank Williams Tonight (Chris Wall)
- Sittin' on Top of the World (Lonnie Carter/Walter Jacobs)
- Ten O'Clock Train (Robert David Hall)
- Just Because (Bob Shelton, Joe Shelton, Sid Robin)
