= Jorja Fox =

American-Canadian actress and producer (born 1968)

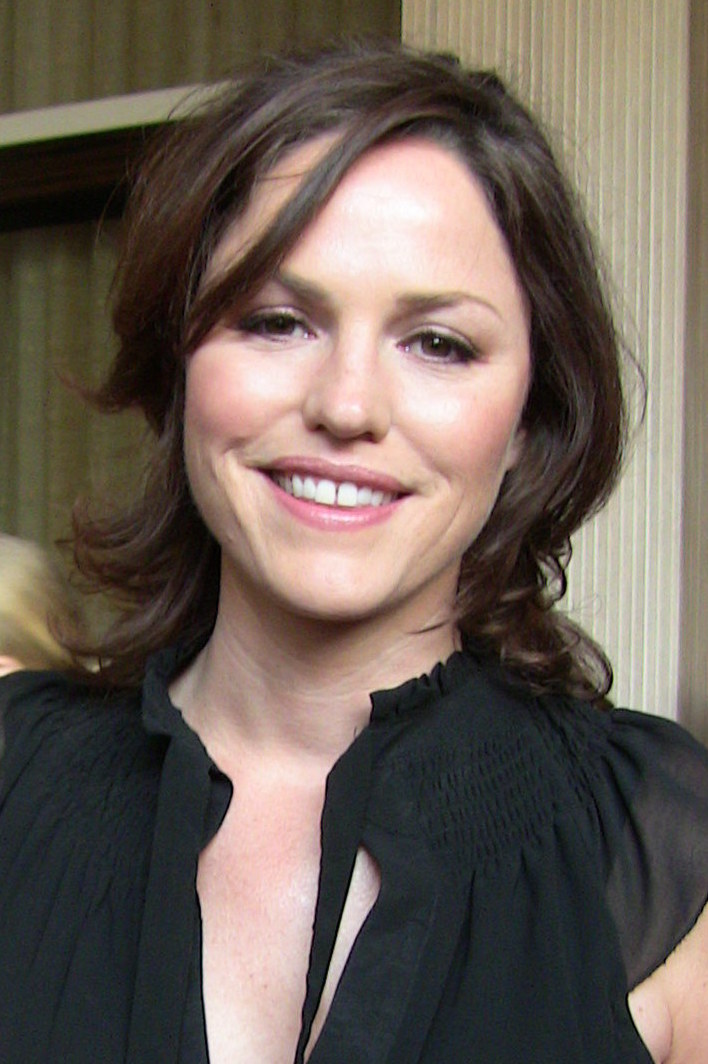
- Fox in March 2009
- Born: July 7, 1968 (age 58); New York City, U.S.
- Other name: Jorjan Fox
- Occupations: Actress, producer
- Years active: 1989–present
- Notable work: ER; The West Wing; CSI: Crime Scene Investigation

Jorja Fox (born July 7, 1968) is an American actress. She first came to prominence with a recurring role in the NBC medical drama ER as Dr. Maggie Doyle from 1996 to 1999. This was followed by another critical success in the recurring role of Secret Service Agent Gina Toscano in the NBC political drama The West Wing in 2000. She portrayed Sara Sidle in the CBS police procedural crime-drama CSI: Crime Scene Investigation, both as a regular (2000–2007, 2010–2015) and recurring (2008–2010) cast member. She reprised the role in the sequel CSI: Vegas, which premiered on October 6, 2021.

== Early life ==
Fox was born in New York City to Montreal-born parents Edward and Marilyn Fox and is of French-Canadian, Belgian and Irish descent. She was raised on a narrow barrier island in Melbourne Beach, Florida. She has an older brother. She describes herself as being overweight while growing up, with a prominent gap between her teeth. By her 20s, she observed that neither her wisdom teeth nor braces had appreciably helped, and Fox said "forget it."

After attending Melbourne High School for two years, she began a modeling career after winning a local contest. She subsequently enrolled as a drama student at the Lee Strasberg Institute in New York City, under the tutelage of actor William Hickey.

== Career ==
Fox had minor roles in films and television series, including the opening scene of a 1993 episode of the NBC legal drama Law & Order. Fox's big break was a recurring role in the third, fourth and fifth seasons (1996–99) of the NBC medical drama ER. She played Dr. Maggie Doyle, a lesbian, no-nonsense and vegetarian emergency intern.

Fox appeared in "The Puppy Episode: Part 2", the April 30, 1997 episode of the sitcom Ellen, in which that series' main character (Ellen DeGeneres) came out as gay.

From 1999 to 2000, she had a recurring role as Secret Service Agent Gina Toscano in the first and second seasons of the NBC political drama The West Wing.

Fox has appeared in the films Velocity Trap and Food for the Heart and she also briefly appeared in Christopher Nolan's cult film Memento, playing the main character's wife in flashback footage.

=== CSI ===
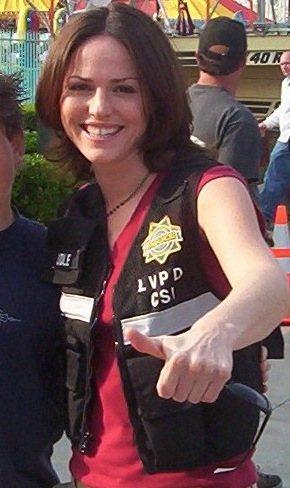
Fox on the set of CSI, March 2004

In 2000, she gained a regular role on the CBS police procedural drama CSI: Crime Scene Investigation as Sara Sidle, a Las Vegas forensic scientist. She and her CSI: Crime Scene Investigation co-star George Eads were fired from the show in 2004. Fox had allegedly failed to submit a letter to CBS confirming that she would be on time for shooting. The disputes were resolved in just over a week, and the two were rehired by CBS, but neither Fox’s nor Eads' salary was raised, in spite of other cast members receiving raises. It was also reported that of the two, Fox was approached first to resume her contract with CSI, but she refused until Eads was rehired as well.

On April 18, 2007, TV Guide began reporting that Fox might not be returning for the eighth season of CSI, having not yet signed a new contract. The seventh season finale turned out to be a cliffhanger involving her character, Sara Sidle. The New York Post reported that Fox did not show up to film the finale because of ongoing issues over her employment. Neither CBS nor Fox's agent confirmed the allegations.

In September 2007, after rumors emerged about Fox's departure from the show, an online forum called "Your Tax Dollars at Work” started a campaign to keep Sara Sidle on CSI; the campaign (called Dollars for Sense) includes mailing the show's producers a dollar so as to keep Fox on the show. With the help of donations, the campaign also organized plane flyovers over the Universal Studios lot in California where CSI is filmed. The banners read "Keep Jorja Fox on CBS.” On October 15, 2007, Fox told Entertainment Weekly that she left CSI, saying that she wanted a break "from the commitment of a weekly television series." Fox requested that the money collected during the "Dollars for Sense" campaign be donated to CASA, an organization dedicated to aiding foster children. On November 15, 2007, the episode "Goodbye and Good Luck" marked the character's final regular appearance in an episode of CSI until the show entered its tenth season.

In May 2008, Fox returned for CSI's ninth season as a guest star. After coming back for the first, second, and fifth episodes, she returned for William Petersen's last episode as the star ("One To Go") in the last scene, when Gil Grissom (Petersen) turns up in the jungle, surprising Sara, and in the episode finish wherein the two shared a passionate kiss.

In the summer of 2009, CBS announced that Fox would be returning to CSI, Fox was initially scheduled to appear in the tenth season premiere ("Family Affair," which aired September 24, 2009) and four additional episodes. However, executive producer Carol Mendelsohn confirmed that Fox's stay had been made "more permanent" and her role extended indefinitely. By July 2011, Fox was confirmed as a full-time, regular cast member again on CSI for the twelfth season, but she was added back to the opening credits for the eleventh season. She remained in the main cast until the show ended after the fifteenth season in September 2015.

=== After CSI ===
After leaving CSI in 2007, Fox produced the musical Stay Forever: The Life and Music of Dusty Springfield starring Kirsten Holly Smith, about the tension between the public image and private life of bisexual musician Dusty Springfield, which played at the Renberg Theatre in the Los Angeles Gay and Lesbian Center.

Fox guest-starred in the Lifetime sitcom Drop Dead Diva. The episode, which aired on August 16, 2009, had her playing a soccer mom with a criminal past.

== Activism and politics ==
Fox is a supporter of the Human Rights Campaign and has been a dedicated vegetarian since the age of 19, working with PETA to help promote vegetarianism and also working with ADI to bring light to the suffering of animals in circuses. She has a purse named after her by the Montréal company Matt & Nat, which designs vegan purses. Fox attended and read at the Los Angeles book launch of Karen Dawn's Thanking the Monkey, and was seen on Access Hollywood discussing how being vegetarian helps the environment. In 2008, Fox volunteered her time to film a Public Service Announcement for the New York–based non-profit Orangutan Outreach, which supports Borneo Orangutan Survival and other projects aimed at ensuring the orangutan's continued survival. The 30-second clip was shown on Animal Planet during the award-winning series Orangutan Island.

== Filmography ==
=== Film ===
Year	Title	Role	Notes
1989	The Kill-Off	Myra Pavlov	
1992	Happy Hell Night	Kappa Sig Girl	Uncredited
1994	Dead Funny	Fate 3	
1995	The Jerky Boys: The Movie	Lazarro's Young Lady	
1998	How to Make the Cruelest Month	Sarah Bryant	
1999	Velocity Trap	Alice Pallas	
1999	Forever Fabulous	Liz Guild	
1999	The Hungry Bachelors Club	Delmar Youngblood	
2000	Memento	Catherine Shelby	
2003	Down with the Joneses	Bev Jones	
2005	Next Exit	Terri	
2010	Accidental Icon: The Real Gidget Story	Narrator	
2011	3 Weeks to Daytona	Cheryl	
2013	Lion Ark	Herself	
2014	Unity	Narrator	Documentary
2019	3022	Diane Ures	
2021	The Map of Tiny Perfect Things	Greta	

=== Television ===
Year	Title	Role	Notes
1992	ABC Afterschool Specials	Diane Dravecki	3 episodes
1993	Lifestories: Families in Crisis	Maggie Glendon	Episode: "Dead Drunk: The Kevin Tunell Story"
1993	Law & Order	Paula Engren	Episode: "Securitate" – Credited as "Jorjan Fox"
1993–1994	Missing Persons	Officer Connie Karadzic	17 episodes
1995	Courthouse	Maureen Dawes	Episode: "Pilot"
1995	Alchemy	Josie	TV movie
1996–1999	ER	Dr. Maggie Doyle	33 episodes
1997	Ellen	The Attractive Woman (uncredited)	Episode: "The Puppy Episode: Part 2"
1997	House of Frankenstein	Felicity	TV movie
1999	Partners	Alex	Episode: "My Sister, My Enemy"
2000	The West Wing	Agent Gina Toscano	5 episodes
2000–2007; 2009–2015	CSI: Crime Scene Investigation	Sara Sidle	Main Cast
2008–2010	CSI: Crime Scene Investigation	Sara Sidle	Recurring cast
2009	Drop Dead Diva	Marianne Neely	Episode: "Second Chances"
2021–2024	CSI: Vegas	Sara Sidle	Main cast

=== Video games ===
Year	Title	Role
2003	CSI: Crime Scene Investigation	Sara Sidle (voice)
2004	CSI: Crime Scene Investigation – Dark Motives	Sara Sidle (voice)

== Awards and nominations ==
Year	Nominated work	Award	Results
2002	CSI: Crime Scene Investigation	Screen Actors Guild Award for Outstanding Performance by an Ensemble in a Drama Series	Nominated
2003	CSI: Crime Scene Investigation	Screen Actors Guild Award for Outstanding Performance by an Ensemble in a Drama Series	Nominated
2004	CSI: Crime Scene Investigation	Screen Actors Guild Award for Outstanding Performance by an Ensemble in a Drama Series	Nominated
2005	CSI: Crime Scene Investigation	Screen Actors Guild Award for Outstanding Performance by an Ensemble in a Drama Series	Won
