= CSI: Crime City =

2010 video game

- Developer: Area/Code
- Publisher: Ubisoft
- Series: CSI
- Platform: Facebook
- Release: October 20, 2010
- Genre: Adventure
- Mode: Single-player

CSI: Crime City was an adventure video game and the eleventh video game adaptation of the CSI: Crime Scene Investigation television series. It was developed by American indie studio Area/Code and published by Ubisoft for Facebook. The game has been shut down as of March 13, 2015.

== Gameplay ==
In Crime City, the player must solve murders by exploring crime scenes.

== Release ==
Ubisoft released the game on October 20, 2010.
