= CSI: 3 Dimensions of Murder =

2006 video game

- Developer: Telltale Games
- Publisher: Ubisoft
- Producer: Chris Ferriter
- Designer: Greg Land
- Programmer: Karen Peterson
- Artist: David Bogan
- Writers: Max Allan Collins; Greg Land
- Composer: John M. Keane
- Engine: Telltale Tool
- Platforms: Microsoft Windows, PlayStation 2
- Release: Microsoft Windows: NA: March 14, 2006; AU: March 2006; EU: March 31, 2006; PlayStation 2: NA: September 25, 2007; EU: October 5, 2007; AU: October 11, 2007
- Genre: Adventure
- Mode: Single-player

CSI: 3 Dimensions of Murder is a computer game based on the CSI: Crime Scene Investigation television series. Unlike the previous CSI games, this game was developed by Telltale Games, rather than 369 Interactive. It was published by Ubisoft, and was released for Microsoft Windows in March 2006.

The game uses a new 3D engine, which changes the gameplay and graphical look of the game, in comparison to 369 Interactive's CSI games.

This game, like the previous CSI games CSI: Crime Scene Investigation and CSI: Miami, follows a distinct pattern of five cases, with the fifth case tying together the previous four.

A PlayStation 2 version of this game was released on the September 25, 2007 in the United States. This version was made by Ubisoft's studio in Sofia, Bulgaria. The PlayStation 2 version is not the same as the Microsoft Windows version. The player has free movement and control of the view, which was required by Sony America. This change created extraordinary difficulties for the developer.

== The Cases ==
=== Case 1: Pictures at an Execution ===
Rich out-of-towner Rachel Maddox is bludgeoned to death in a posh art gallery the day before her wedding to Mark Stock. The suspected murder weapon? An expensive hawk statue that's flown the coop. You work with Warrick Brown on this case. The evidence points to her hot-tempered fiancé Mark, Nathan Ackerman, the owner of the art gallery, and Patrick Milton, a reclusive artist commissioned to paint a portrait of the victim. It is discovered that Patrick killed Rachel after her constant criticism and nit-picking of his portrait pushed him over the edge.

Cast

Nathan Ackerman: James Monroe

Mark Stock: David Collins

Patrick Milton: Bob Sarlotte

=== Case 2: First Person Shooter ===
The CEO of a video game company on the verge of a high-profile release is shot dead at the biggest gaming trade show of the year. Life imitating art, or something more sinister? The only suspects are Maya Ngyuen, a marketing woman who was trained with guns as a child, Andy Penmore, another co-worker, also the victim's roommate, and Craig Landers, an ex-employee who might've given the guy a good swing. The player works with Nick Stokes on this case. Eventually, the investigation reveals Andy murdered the victim because he wanted to sell out.

This case is a dramaticized, humorous send-up of the cancellation and subsequent fan reaction surrounding Sam & Max: Freelance Police, a game many Telltale employees had worked on pre-cancellation.

The 3 Dimensions of Murder demo features a portion of this case.

Cast

Maya Nguyen: Sumalee Montano

Craig Landers: David Collins

Andy Penmore: Andrew Chaikin

Gun Shop Clerk: Sydney Ramin

=== Case 3: Daddy's Girl ===
Casino heiress Carrie Canelli has been victimized in her apartment. The crime scene is crawling with blood spatters, fibers, and fingerprints — all that's missing is the body. The only suspects are the victim's twin sister Lucy, her abusive fiancé Michael, and Alex, a mysterious male nurse. In this case the player works with Sara Sidle. It turns out Carrie did not want her father's fortune and agreed with Lucy that she deserved it more, so Carrie and Alex faked her death so Lucy would get everything.

Michael Dubios: Andrew Chaikin

Alex Porterson: David Collins

Lucy Canelli: Sumalee Motano

The character of Carrie Canelli is seen but not heard at the end of the case

=== Case 4: Rough Cut ===
The son of a prominent real estate developer is found dead in a remote area of the Nevada desert. Is he a victim of poison, politics, or promiscuity? Evidence points to his wife, his wealthy mother, and a sleazy contractor. You work with Greg Sanders on this case.

Cast

Carla Mitchell: Sally Clawson

Emily Hanson: Sydney Rainin

Lou Astor: Bob Sarlottte

=== Case 5: The Big White Lie ===
A sleazy private investigator has been shot to death in an alley, and the body is found by one of CSI's own, Doc Robbins. Retracing his final steps reveals a web of deceit, lies, and corruption. Who — and how many — pulled the trigger? You work with Gil Grissom and Catherine Willows on this case. This case ties the first, and third cases together.

=== Case 6: Rich Mom, Poor Mom (PlayStation 2 Exclusive) ===
A casino waitress is found stabbed in her home and is rushed to the hospital, where she survives. It is found out in the investigation that she is pregnant, and later miscarries, the child of a prominent Texas oilman, who happens to be in town for the week, with his young wife. Did he stab the victim, did the wife do it, or did the victim's live-in boyfriend do it? You work with Catherine Willows on this case.

- Note: This case is Case 2 in CSI: Hard Evidence.

== Reception ==
Reception

Aggregate scores
Aggregator	Score	
Aggregator	PC	PS2
GameRankings	68.65%	58.33%
Metacritic	67/100	58/100

Review scores
Publication	Score	
Publication	PC	PS2
Adventure Gamers	3.5/5	N/A
GameSpot	6/10	4.5/10
GameSpy	2.5/5	N/A
IGN	8.6/10	7/10
PlayStation Official Magazine – UK	N/A	6/10
PC Gamer (UK)	55%	N/A
PC Gamer (US)	79%	N/A
PC Zone	62%	N/A
X-Play	3/5	N/A

The game was met with mixed reception. GameRankings and Metacritic gave it a score of 69% and 67 out of 100 for the PC version, and 58% and 58 out of 100 for the PlayStation 2 version. The game's global sales combined with those of its two predecessors—CSI: Dark Motives and CSI: Crime Scene Investigation—reached roughly 2.4 million copies across all platforms by December 2006.
