= Mystery Studio =

- Company type: Private
- Industry: Casual games
- Founded: 2002
- Headquarters: Montevideo, Uruguay
- Key people: Gabriel Gambetta, Director and CTO
- Website: www.mysterystudio.com

Mystery Studio was a casual game development studio based in Montevideo, Uruguay. Mystery Studio is mostly known for their hit game, Betty's Beer Bar, which brought the theme and general mechanic of Tapper to the casual gamers, transforming it completely along the way, and creating a whole new genre of casual games, multitasking/serving games, whose more recent hit members include Diner Dash and Mystic Inn. The company closed its doors in 2011.

== History ==
Mystery Studio was founded by Gabriel Gambetta and Esteban Guelvenzu in 2002. The name was initially "Mr.Io Studio", which sounded like "misterio", the Spanish word for "mystery". Over the year it has developed several 1st and 3rd party games such as Betty's Beer Bar and CSI:NY : The Game.

Mystery Studio also notably partnered with publisher Playfirst in 2006, developing a dynamic match-three puzzle game, Pirate Poppers, that Playfirst distributed. Pirate Poppers was well-received, breaking the top 10 downloads and top 10 sales lists of major downloadable game channels.

Mystery Studio's director and CTO is Gabriel Gambetta. He is a noted Linux proponent, developing his games exclusively under Fedora Linux and cross-compiling them for Microsoft Windows and Mac OS X, the two platforms that his games are actually on sale for. The studio shut down after he moved from Uruguay to Zürich and accepted a job at Google.

== Mystery Studio games ==
- Real Detectives: Murder in Miami (2010) – Programmed by Mystery Studio, developed by FreezeTag
- The Lost Cases of Sherlock Holmes 2 (2010) – Programmed by Mystery Studio, developed by Legacy Interactive
- Fashion Assistant (2009)
- The Conjurer (2009) – Programmed by Mystery Studio, developed by FreezeTag
- Murder, She Wrote (2009) – Programmed by Mystery Studio, developed by Legacy Interactive
- CSI: New York (2008) – Programmed by Mystery Studio, developed by Legacy Interactive, published by UbiSoft
- Lavender's Botanicals (2008) – Developed by Mystery Studio, published by uClick
- The Lost Cases of Sherlock Holmes (2008) – Programmed by Mystery Studio, developed by Legacy Interactive, published by uClick
- Brain Spa (2007) Programmed by Mystery Studio, developed by Legacy Interactive, published by UbiSoft
- Breaking News (2007)
- Cathy's Caribbean Club (2007)
- Pigllionaire (2006)
- Pirate Poppers (2006) – Developed by Mystery Studio, published by PlayFirst
- Wild West Wendy (2005)
- FaceIt (2004)
- Betty's Beer Bar (2003)
- PegSweeper (2003)
