= George Eads =

American actor (born 1967)

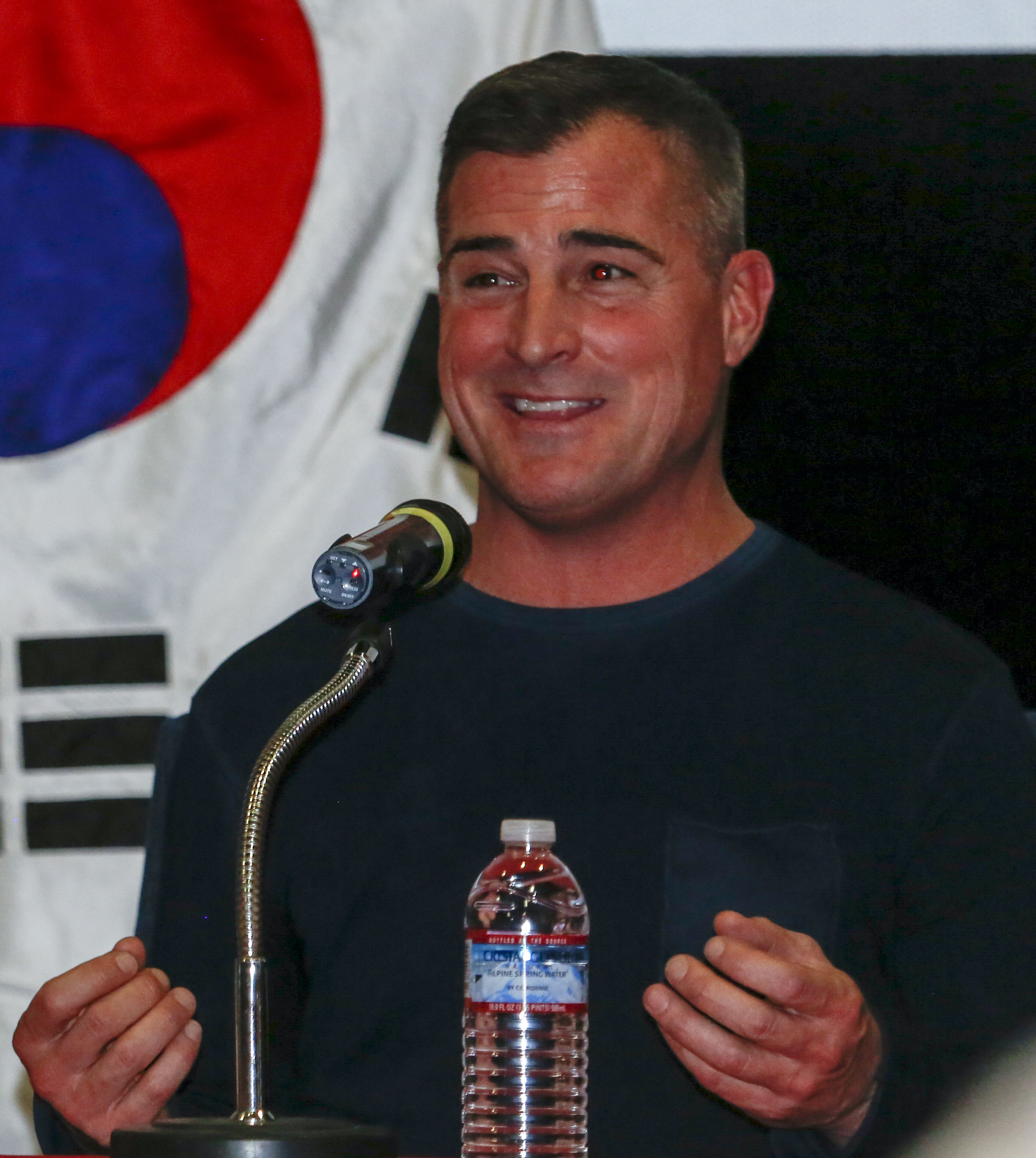
- Eads visiting USAG - Yongsan in 2019
- Born: George Coleman Eads III; March 1, 1967 (age 59); Fort Worth, Texas, U.S.
- Education: Texas Tech University
- Occupation: Actor
- Years active: 1994–present
- Known for: Nick Stokes in CSI: Crime Scene Investigation; Jack Dalton in MacGyver

George Coleman Eads III (born March 1, 1967) is an American actor, known for his role as Nick Stokes on the CBS police drama CSI: Crime Scene Investigation. He later starred as Jack Dalton on the CBS action-adventure series MacGyver for three seasons.

== Biography ==
=== Early life ===
Eads attended Belton High School in Belton, Texas. Eads graduated from Texas Tech University (1989) with a degree in marketing. In college, he was a member of the Phi Delta Theta fraternity. Prior to beginning an acting career, Eads worked as a copy machine salesman, as well as selling first aid and safety supplies for Cintas.

=== Career ===
Eads drove to Los Angeles in a pickup truck borrowed from his stepfather, to pursue his acting career. Eads got his big break on the primetime soap opera Savannah, in which he played the conniving Travis Peterson and later Travis's twin brother, Nick Corelli.

Eads guest-starred as paramedic Greg Powell on ER in 1997 and worked on several television films such as Crowned and Dangerous (1997).

In 2000, Eads became one of the lead characters of the CBS police drama CSI: Crime Scene Investigation, in which he portrayed forensic scientist Nick Stokes.

Parallel to CSI, Eads worked on made-for-television films, such as 2003's Monte Walsh and 2004's Evel Knievel.

In August 2013, prior to CSI's 14th season, Eads reportedly took a leave of absence after having an altercation with a writer from the show over what was described as "creative issues". On November 25, 2014, Eads was announced to be leaving the show, which in any event was not renewed for the following season; he only missed the series finale television film, Immortality.

From 2016 to 2019, Eads starred as Jack Dalton in CBS's reboot series MacGyver. In 2018, while the series' third season was filming, Eads asked to be released from his contract so he could spend more time with his young daughter who resides in Los Angeles, as MacGyver is filmed in Atlanta. Producers ultimately agreed with Eads being written out of the show, but left open the opportunity for him to return as a guest star in the future. However, his character was ultimately killed off. The February 1, 2019 episode "Father + Bride + Betrayal" was his last on MacGyver.

== In other media ==
In March 2009, Eads was voted as one of TV Guide's Sexiest Male Actors in the TV Guide's "Sexiest Stars" issue. The "Sexiest Stars" issue voted The Mentalist's Simon Baker as the Sexiest Male Actor. Eads was not discouraged by this, however, and said that he was very appreciative of his fans calling him "sexy". "It's sweet and kind. It makes me want to work harder for them. It makes me want to be sexier."

== Filmography ==
=== Film ===
Year	Title	Role	Notes
1994	Dust to Dust	Black Wolf	
2014	Gutshot Straight	Jack Daniel	
2014	Sex Ed	Jimmy	
2019	The Battle of Jangsari	Colonel Stephen	

=== Television ===
Year	Title	Role	Notes
1995	Strange Luck	J.R. Dean	Episode: "Hat Trick"
1996	The Ultimate Lie	Ben McGrath	Television film
1996–1997	Savannah	Travis Peterson (pilot episode); Nick Corelli (in the series)	26 episodes
1997	Crowned and Dangerous	Riley Baxter	Television film
1997–1998	ER	Paramedic Greg Powell	3 episodes
2000	The Spring	Gus	Television film
2000	Grapevine	Thumper Klein	5 episodes
2000–2015	CSI: Crime Scene Investigation	Nick Stokes	Main role
2002	Just a Walk in the Park	Adam Willingford	Television film
2002	Second String	Tommy Baker	Television film
2003	Monte Walsh	Frank "Shorty" Austin	Television film
2004	Evel Knievel	Evel Knievel	Television film
2004	Justice League Unlimited	Captain Atom	Voice, episode: "Initiation"
2008	Two and a Half Men	George	Episode: "Fish in a Drawer"
2010–2012	Young Justice	Barry Allen/Flash	Voice, 5 episodes
2016–2019	MacGyver	Jack Dalton	Main role
2017	Michael Jackson's Halloween	Vincent's Dad	Voice, television special
2020–2021	This Is Us	Football Coach	2 episodes

=== Video games ===
Year	Title	Role	Notes
2003	CSI: Crime Scene Investigation	Nick Stokes	
2004	CSI: Dark Motives	Nick Stokes	
2006	CSI: 3 Dimensions of Murder	Nick Stokes	
2007	CSI: Hard Evidence	Nick Stokes	
2009	CSI: Deadly Intent	Nick Stokes	
2010	CSI: Fatal Conspiracy	Nick Stokes	
