= Timothy Cubbison =

American film producer

- Occupations: producer, director, writer and casting director
- Notable work: Fallout 4; Life Is Strange; Rise of the Tomb Raider; Helluva Boss

Timothy Cubbison is an American producer, director, writer and casting director, including for the video games Fallout 4, Life Is Strange and Rise of the Tomb Raider, and as the founder of the voice recording studio Horseless Cowboy.

== Education ==
Cubbison graduated from Ramstein American High School in Germany. He earned a B.S. in Radio-Television-Film from the University of Texas at Austin and an M.B.A. from the USC Marshall School of Business.

== Career ==
He founded voice recording studio Horseless Cowboy in 2005.

=== Theatre ===
Cubbison directed the world premieres of two plays, Kicking Gravity and Out of Gardenia. The plays, which were produced by Cubbison and Adam Agardy, were the winners of the Hired Gun Playwrighting competition.

=== Video games ===
Cubbison served as a voice producer on Fallout 3 and a voice director on CSI: NY. He received his first writing credit with work on Infamous and began working as casting director with Command & Conquer 4: Tiberian Twilight. He has worked with Mickey Rourke, Kris Kristofferson, Sigourney Weaver, Laurence Fishburne and Samuel L. Jackson.

Cubbison was nominated for Video Game Casting Director of the Year at the 2019 Heller Awards. He is credited on over 50 titles including four BAFTA winners, five DICE Awards winners, five Game Critics Awards winners, and five Game Developers Choice Awards winners.

=== Film ===
His short films and documentaries were played at film festivals in the United States, Germany and New Zealand. In 2016, the German language film, Ich Warte Hier, directed by Harry Buerkle won the award for Best Documentary at the Bamberger Kurzfilmtage. It was distributed by Amazon Prime Video.

=== Writing and conferences ===
He is a contributor to Forbes.com and the editor of the Horseless Cowboy Medium publication He speaks at schools like USC and conferences like M-Dev. He was an organizer of the 2017 E2 conference and the 2016 E2VR conference at the University of Southern California.

== Credits ==
| Year | Title | Credit | Media |
|---|---|---|---|
| 2008 | Broken | Producer | Short |
| 2008 | CSI: NY | Voice Director, Voice Producer | Video game |
| 2009 | Fallout 3 | Voice Producer (Los Angeles), Special Thanks | Video game |
| 2009 | inFAMOUS | Additional Voice Director, Writer (pedestrian dialogue) | Video game |
| 2009 | Teenage Mutant Ninja Turtles: Smash-Up | Voice Director, Voice Producer | Video game |
| 2009 | CSI: Deadly Intent | Voice Director (Los Angeles) | Video game |
| 2009 | Rogue Warrior | Voice Director, Voice Producer | Video game |
| 2009 | James Cameron's Avatar: The Game | Voice Producer | Video game |
| 2010 | Dark Void | Voice Producer | Video game |
| 2010 | Command & Conquer 4: Tiberian Twilight | Casting Director, Writer | Video game |
| 2010 | Dead to Rights: Retribution | Voice Producer | Video game |
| 2010 | Iron Man 2 | Casting Director, Voice Producer | Video game |
| 2010 | ModNation Racers | Writer | Video game |
| 2010 | Halo: Reach | Casting Director (uncredited) | Video game |
| 2010 | Fallout: New Vegas | Casting Director, Voice Director | Video game |
| 2010 | CSI: Fatal Conspiracy | Voice Director (Los Angeles) | Video game |
| 2010 | The Fight: Lights Out | Producer (live-action cutscenes) | Video game |
| 2011 | NCIS Video Game | Voice Producer | Video game |
| 2011 | Killzone 3 | Casting Director | Video game |
| 2011 | Thor: God of Thunder | Casting Director, Voice Producer | Video game |
| 2011 | Hunted: The Demon's Forge | Casting Director, Voice Producer | Video game |
| 2011 | TERA | Casting Director, Voice Producer | Video game |
| 2011 | Dungeon Siege III | Casting Director, Voice Producer | Video game |
| 2011 | Captain America: Super Soldier | Casting Director, Production Supervisor | Video game |
| 2011 | The Elder Scrolls V: Skyrim | Casting Director, Voice Producer | Video game |
| 2011 | World Gone Sour | Casting Director, Voice Producer | Video game |
| 2011 | Cage Shift | Executive producer | Short |
| 2012 | Reality Fighters | Casting Director, Voice Producer | Video game |
| 2012 | Quantum Conundrum | Casting Director, Voice Producer | Video game |
| 2012 | The Expendables 2 Videogame | Casting Director, Voice Producer | Video game |
| 2012 | Guild Wars 2 | Casting Director, Voice Producer | Video game |
| 2012 | Dishonored | Casting Director, Voice Producer | Video game |
| 2013 | Aliens: Colonial Marines | Casting Director, Voice Producer | Video game |
| 2013 | Tomb Raider | Voice Producer | Video game |
| 2013 | Star Trek | Casting Director, Voice Producer | Video game |
| 2013 | The Smurfs 2 | Casting Director, Voice Producer | Video game |
| 2013 | Tangents & the Times | Producer | TV series |
| 2014 | Lichdom: Battlemage | Casting Director, Voice Producer | Video game |
| 2014 | Wildstar | Casting Director, Voice Producer | Video game |
| 2014 | Murdered: Soul Suspect | Casting Director, Voice Producer | Video game |
| 2014 | Destiny | Casting Director | Video game |
| 2014 | Alien: Isolation | Casting Director, Voice Producer | Video game |
| 2014 | The Evil Within | Casting Director, Voice Producer | Video game |
| 2015 | Life Is Strange | Casting Director, Voice Producer | Video game |
| 2015 | Killing Floor 2 | Casting Director, Voice Producer | Video game |
| 2015 | Destiny: The Taken King | Casting Director, Voice Producer | Video game |
| 2015 | Guild Wars 2: Heart of Thorns | Casting Director, Voice Producer | Video game |
| 2015 | Rise of the Tomb Raider | Casting Director, Voice Producer | Video game |
| 2015 | Fallout 4 | Casting Director, Voice Producer | Video game |
| 2016 | The Technomancer | Casting Director, Voice Producer | Video game |
| 2016 | Destiny: Rise of Iron | Casting Director, Voice Producer | Video game |
| 2016 | Dishonored 2 | Casting Director, Voice Producer | Video game |
| 2016 | Star Fox Zero: The Battle Begins | Voice Producer | Video |
| 2017 | The Elder Scrolls: Legends | Casting Director, Voice Producer | Video game |
| 2017 | Rock Band VR | Casting Director, Voice Producer | Video game |
| 2017 | The Elder Scrolls Legends: The Fall of the Dark Brotherhood | Casting Director, Voice Producer | Video game |
| 2017 | Prey | Casting Director, Voice Producer | Video game |
| 2017 | Rising Storm 2: Vietnam | Casting Director, Voice Producer | Video game |
| 2017 | Destiny 2 | Voice Producer | Video game |
| 2017 | Dishonored: Death of the Outsider | Casting Director, Voice Producer | Video game |
| 2017 | The Evil Within 2 | Casting Director, Voice Producer | Video game |
| 2017 | Killing Floor: Incursion | Casting Director, Voice Producer | Video game |
| 2018 | I'll Wait Here aka Ich Warte Hier | Executive producer | Documentary |
| 2019 | Helluva Boss | Casting Director | Television pilot |
| 2020–present | Helluva Boss | Casting Director | Web series |
