= CSI: Hard Evidence =

2007 video game

- Developer: Telltale Games (Note: Mac OS X port developed by TransGaming.)
- Publisher: Ubisoft
- Producer: Chris Ferriter
- Designer: Greg Land
- Programmer: Karen Peterson
- Artist: Lea Mai Nguyen
- Writer: Max Allan Collins
- Composer: John M. Keane
- Engine: Telltale Tool
- Platforms: Windows, Xbox 360, Wii, Mac OS X
- Release: September 25, 2007: Windows & Xbox 360; NA: September 25, 2007; EU: October 5, 2007; AU: October 11, 2007; Wii; NA: January 17, 2008; PAL: March 20, 2008; Mac OS X; WW: November 6, 2008
- Genre: Adventure
- Mode: Single-player

CSI: Hard Evidence is a computer game based on the CSI: Crime Scene Investigation television series. This is the fifth CSI game released, including CSI: Miami.

As with the previous CSI games, there are five cases to work on. However, the game includes improvements on CSI: 3 Dimensions of Murder, like a 3D crime scene kit. The voice of Sara Sidle is again performed by a soundalike (Kate Savage) and not Jorja Fox. Catherine Willows is also replaced by a soundalike in this game, with Edie Mirman standing in for Marg Helgenberger.

This is Telltale Games' first console game, released for Xbox 360 and Wii in line with the PC version. A Mac OS X version was later released by TransGaming, using their Cider technology.

== The Cases ==
=== Case 1: Burning For You ===
In the first case, a taxi driver, Bob Castor, was killed in an apparent arson attack inside his car. The player works with Nick Stokes in this case.

During the investigation, the victim was found to be a racist with a criminal record. The details narrow down the suspects to Ed Danville, a homeless man from Arizona, Liz Sunderland, an aspiring artist whom Ed had a one-night stand with. And Debra Finch, Liz's lesbian lover and the victim's old high school prom date, who he had harassed for two weeks. It is revealed that Ed killed Bob because of his racist attitude towards the women, which Ed would not tolerate.

=== Case 2: Double Down ===
Waitress Connie Roth is repeatedly stabbed in her house and survives but doesn't know who hurt her. The player works with Catherine Willows in this case. Connie's boyfriend Shane Michaels, also the owner of the casino where Connie worked, is initially suspected after Connie is found to have entered into a contract with aging African-American tycoon Everett Brower to be the surrogate mother for his son. However, after discovering that Shane was oblivious to the arrangement, the only suspects are Brower and his trophy wife Nicole Watt. Nicole attacked Connie because she was also pregnant, but she was carrying a girl, and her husband wanted a boy, causing her to fear Connie would steal him away. This case can also be played as the sixth case of the PlayStation 2 version of 3 Dimensions of Murder.

=== Case 3: Shock Rock ===
The bodies of four members of a rock band called Bullet Train are found electrocuted. The player works with Warrick Brown in this case.

The band members each have a record, except for the young singer. The suspects are the band's roadie/sound-tech, who was picked on by the band; his current lover, who is the band's second choice for a singer, the band's hateful manager, and Bullet Train's ex-singer, who was also the ex-wife of the lead guitar player. The evidence eventually reveals the roadie's lover seduced him into killing the band so she could take over as the lead singer.

=== Case 4: In Your Eyes ===
Dr. Pradyut Bandereet, an eye surgeon originally from India, is brutally killed in his own home. The only witness is his blind wife, Amita. After realizing Amita's alibi has holes in it, she becomes a suspect along with the victim's daughter Adya and his business partner Aadarsh Diwan, whom Pradyut was forcing Adya to marry. The player works with Greg Sanders in this case. Amita turns out to be the murderer because she and Adya were suffering from Pradyut's constant attempts to control them both. Adya also confesses to the murder, but the evidence supports Amita's story.

=== Case 5: The Peacemaker ===
There has been a gun shootout where many bullets have been found, and a store clerk is shot repeatedly. A man named Keith, found at the scene of the crime admits to killing the clerk, but evidence soon suggests the work of his brothers, all three of whom are triplets. The case includes characters from the "Shock Rock" case. The player works with Gil Grissom in this case. It's revealed the triplets' mother was having an affair with the victim and despite Keith's warnings, his brothers confronted him, but he only opened fire on them. Keith's brothers took cover behind a gun case which reflected the sun's glare and blinded them, so they tried to shoot out the glass in order to see better but wound up killing the victim by accident, and Keith covered for them.

== Reception ==
Reception

Aggregate score
Aggregator	Score		
Aggregator	PC	Wii	Xbox 360
Metacritic	63/100	49/100	48/100

Review scores
Publication	Score		
Publication	PC	Wii	Xbox 360
Adventure Gamers	3/5	N/A	N/A
Eurogamer	N/A	N/A	4/10
Game Informer	N/A	N/A	4/10
GameSpot	5.5/10	N/A	5.5/10
IGN	6.1/10	5.8/10	6.1/10
Nintendo World Report	N/A	2.5/10	N/A
Official Nintendo Magazine	N/A	60%	N/A
Official Xbox Magazine (UK)	N/A	N/A	3/10
Official Xbox Magazine (US)	N/A	N/A	7/10
PC Gamer (US)	73%	N/A	N/A
411Mania	N/A	4.3/10	4/10

CSI: Hard Evidence was met with mixed reception from critics, with reviewers citing repetitive gameplay and a lack of challenge as the main areas of weakness. It was also pointed out that little attention was given to implementing interesting achievements for the Xbox 360 version.
