= CSI: Miami (video game) =

2004 video game

- Developers: Radical Entertainment (Windows) (Note: Under the 369 Interactive label); Gameloft (iOS)
- Publishers: Ubisoft (Windows); Gameloft (iOS)
- Designer: Steve Bocska
- Programmer: Joel Kinman
- Artist: Darren Woo
- Composer: Graeme Raevell
- Platforms: Microsoft Windows, iOS, Mobile
- Release: Windows: NA: November 16, 2004; PAL: November 26, 2004; iOS; November 14, 2008
- Genre: Adventure

CSI: Miami is a 2004 adventure video game based on the CSI: Miami television series. The game was developed by Radical Entertainment (under the 369 Interactive label), published by Ubisoft, and was released for the Microsoft Windows on November 16, 2004. In 2008, Gameloft redeveloped the game for iOS.

The game, like CSI: Crime Scene Investigation, follows a distinct pattern of five cases, with the fifth case tying together the previous four.

== Plot ==
=== PC version ===
==== Case 1 – Later, Gator ====
A severed arm, belonging to a man named Tim Cole, has been found on a golf course next to the body of an alligator. In this case, the player works with Calleigh Duquesne. Persons of interest are Heather Cole, the victim's wife who was fed up with his philandering; Russell Cole, his absent son; Ty Landon, a golf club member; Ronni Landon, Ty's wife who was sleeping with both Tim and Russ; Jessica Landon, Ty and Ronni's daughter and Russ's girlfriend; and Judge Walter Lawford. Russ is the first suspect as he vanished just before his father's arm was found and his alibi turns out to be false, but it turns out Russ was at a college party and arrested for intoxication. Further evidence implicates Ronni as the killer, but the case is solved when a scorecard found at Tim's house indicated he was there two days before he died, contradicting Heather's story that she kicked him out a week earlier. Heather finally decided Tim was never going to change his ways, so she killed him, cut up his body, and dumped it at sea. When the alligator got hold of one of Tim's arms, Heather planted evidence in the Landon house to make it seem that Ronni had killed Tim out of jealousy.

==== Case 2 – Crack or Jack ====
In a nightclub investigated by the FBI, the owner, Jack Wilson, is found dead in the middle of the dance floor, struck on the head with a lamp. In this case, the player works with Tim Speedle. Persons of interest are Enrique, the nightclub's Hispanic bouncer who was embezzling from Jack; Nicky Winters, a waitress working in a bar across town; and Ron Preston, the former business partner of the victim. The player also meets lawyer Donny Bronson. It is eventually revealed that Jack paid Enrique and Nicky to frame Ron for drug trafficking, as Ron was causing Jack to lose business. However, Nicky wound up revealing the plan to Ron out of guilt, and Ron killed Jack by accident during the ensuing confrontation. Ron then panicked and frantically staged the scene to as if it had been an accident.

==== Case 3 – The Hate Boat ====
Adult film actress Ella Sinclair is found dead in a boat with strangulation marks and a gunshot wound to the head. In this case the player works with Eric Delko. Persons of interest are Julia Alvarez, a singer who called 911; Thad Wilson, Julia's BDSM-loving husband and manager; and Troy Sullivan, Thad's psychiatrist. DNA results reveal that Thad was having intimacy issues with Julia, and was sleeping with Ella under the belief she was a sexual surrogate prescribed to him by Troy. However, a recording of one of Thad's sessions with Ella ended up on the Internet, upsetting Julia as it created bad publicity for her. Ultimately, the discovery of the murder weapon proves that Troy killed Ella, as he was actually a serial killer who was murdering prostitutes to satisfy his sexual cravings.

==== Case 4 – Sunstroke ====
Retired real-estate magnate Roy Diamond is found dead in a chair on the beach outside of his house, next to the body of his dog. There are no visual signs of murder but the death of two beings at once is too much of a coincidence to rule out the possibility of murder, especially after it comes to light that Diamond's son also died a suspicious death. In this case the player works with Yelina Salas. Persons of interest are Hugo Jackson, the house cook, Martin Fordham, the victim's other son (who was illegitimate) as well as his valet; Denise Diamond, the wife of the dead son and prime suspect in his death; and Donny Bronson. It is revealed that the son was not murdered, but that Denise killed her father-in-law because of his advances toward her.

==== Case 5 – Final Judgement ====
Judge Lawford is found dead in his study with a gunshot wound to the head. Suspects from all other cases are included in this one, as this is the case which ties the other cases together. In this case the player works with Horatio Caine, but when interviewing suspects, the player works with each of the other CSIs, depending which suspect the player interviews. Persons of interest are all the murderers from the previous four cases (Heather Cole, Ron Preston, Troy Sullivan, and Denise Diamond); a journalist who worked with Lawford on his autobiography and claims to be abducted by one of the perps; Ty Landon; and Donny Bronson.

=== iOS Case ===
In the iOS version there is only one case. A woman's body is found washed up on South Beach with a gunshot wound in her shoulder and fluid in her lungs. In this case the player works as Horatio Caine. Her name is Madison Healey, the water in her lungs is chlorinated, and the gun isn't the murder weapon. The suspects are Joshua Martin; Ema Rodriguez; and Diego Sanchez.

== Reception ==
Reception

Aggregate scores
Aggregator	Score
GameRankings	57.89%
Metacritic	54/100

Review scores
Publication	Score
1Up.com	C−
Adventure Gamers	2.5/5
GameSpot	6/10
GameSpy	2/5
GameZone	6.8/10
IGN	(Mobile) 8.5/10 (iOS) 7/10 (PC) 6/10
PC Gamer (UK)	50%
PC Gamer (US)	62%
PC Zone	55%
X-Play	2/5

The game was met with mixed reception, as GameRankings gave the PC version a score of 57.89%, while Metacritic gave it 54 out of 100.
