= CSI: Dark Motives =

2004 video game

- Developers: Radical Entertainment (PC) (Note: Under the 369 Interactive label); Powerhead Games (DS)
- Publisher: Ubisoft
- Designer: Steve Bocska
- Programmer: Julian Beak
- Artist: Darren Woo
- Composer: John M. Keane
- Platforms: Microsoft Windows, Nintendo DS
- Release: Windows: NA: March 23, 2004; PAL: May 15, 2004; Nintendo DS: PAL: November 2, 2007; NA: November 20, 2007
- Genre: Adventure
- Mode: Single player

CSI: Dark Motives is a computer game based on the CSI: Crime Scene Investigation television series. The game was developed by Radical Entertainment (under the 369 Interactive label), published by Ubisoft, and was released for the PC in 2004. In November 2007 it was remade by Powerhead Games, published by Ubisoft and released for Nintendo DS. The Microsoft Xbox version of CSI: Crime Scene Investigation also contains the cases featured in this game.

== The Cases ==
=== Case 1: "Daredevil Disaster" ===
When Ace Dillinger, a professional stuntman for World's Wildest Stunts, crashes his motorbike at a stunt show, there is a call for the CSI crew. You play a new recruit working with Catherine Willows on this case. The suspects are David McLadden, the stunt supervisor, Cory Muzotti, the show's producer, and Leslie Handleman, a motorcycle mechanic. The evidence reveals that Cory bribed Leslie to sabotage the bike, in order for the accident to generate much-needed publicity for the show.

=== Case 2: "Prints and Pauper" ===
A seemingly homeless man is found dead in an abandoned insane asylum. The contents of his stomach seem to show otherwise. You work with Warrick Brown on this case. The suspects in this case point to Markus van der Hellen, the owner of a classy French restaurant, Clair Thomas, a socialite whose father recently died, and Lane Jackson, the manager of a pawnshop. Ultimately, the victim turns out to have apparently been Clair's half-brother, whom she killed when he planned to challenge her over their father's estate. However, the man had actually been the result of Clair's father's first wife having an affair with the chauffeur, which led to Clair's father angrily cutting ties with his son when the truth came out. Years later, as Mr. Thomas was dying, he regretted his past actions and tried to reconnect with his son, but died before he could find him.

=== Case 3: "Diggin' It" ===
Human bones are dug up at a construction site for a new casino. It is believed the site is an ancient Indian burial ground. You work with Sara Sidle in this case. Suspects include the previous owner of the land, Elliot Lansdown, the construction supervisor, John Montana, a university lecturer, and a well-known psychic who had visions of when the victim was still alive.

=== Case 4: "Miss Direction" ===
A woman is shot dead during a rehearsal for a play, apparently shot with a prop gun. You will work with Nick Stokes in this mission. The suspects of this case are a fellow actress with whom the victim may have been having an affair with, the victim's husband and the stage manager.

=== Case 5: "Dragon and Dropping" ===
A poisonous Komodo is killed at a casino circus and a human toe is found in its cage. Who got this peaceful predator to attack the victim anyway? You work with Gil Grissom on this case. The suspects involved are the circus ringleader, a missing security guard, a funeral director, a local doctor and a retired Ukrainian air-force pilot.

== Reception ==
=== Critical reviews ===
Reception

Aggregate scores
Aggregator	Score	
Aggregator	DS	PC
GameRankings	55%	65%
Metacritic	N/A	65/100

Review scores
Publication	Score	
Publication	DS	PC
Adventure Gamers	3/5	2.5/5
Computer Games Magazine	N/A	2.5/5
Computer Gaming World	N/A	1.5/5
GameSpot	N/A	6.3/10
GameSpy	N/A	3/5
IGN	4.8/10	8.4/10
PC Format	N/A	60%
PC Gamer (US)	N/A	62%
PC Zone	N/A	60%
X-Play	N/A	3/5
The Cincinnati Enquirer	N/A	3.5/5

The PC version received "mixed" reviews according to the review aggregation website Metacritic.

=== Sales ===
In the United States, the PC version sold between 100,000 and 250,000 copies by August 2006, but was outsold by its predecessor, CSI: Crime Scene Investigation. It also received a "Silver" sales award from the Entertainment and Leisure Software Publishers Association (ELSPA), indicating sales of at least 100,000 copies in the United Kingdom. By August 2006, combined sales of computer versions of the CSI game franchise had reached 250,000 units in the United States alone. Global sales of the series totaled roughly 2.4 million copies across all platforms by that December, at the time of the fourth entry's announcement.
