= CSI: Crime Scene Investigation (video game) =

2003 video game

- PC cover art
- Developers: Radical Entertainment (Win, Xbox) (Note: Under the 369 Interactive label); EPCConnect (Mac)
- Publishers: Ubi Soft (Win, Xbox); Aspyr (Mac)
- Designer: Jason Bone
- Programmer: Wilkin Ng
- Artist: Darren Woo
- Composer: John M. Keane
- Platforms: Windows, Mac OS X, Xbox
- Release: Windows: NA: March 25, 2003; PAL: May 15, 2003; Macintosh: WW: December 6, 2004; Xbox: NA: December 14, 2004; PAL: February 4, 2005
- Genre: Adventure
- Mode: Single-player

CSI: Crime Scene Investigation is a video game based on the CSI: Crime Scene Investigation television series. The game was developed by Radical Entertainment (under the 369 Interactive label), published by Ubi Soft, and was released for the PC in 2003. It was also ported by EPCConnect, and published by Aspyr on the Macintosh.

This game, like CSI: Miami and CSI: 3 Dimensions of Murder follows a distinct pattern of five cases, with the fifth case tying together the previous four. The Xbox version of the game however, also contains the cases from its successor: CSI: Dark Motives.

CSI was a commercial success, with global sales above 500,000 units by early 2004. It received mixed reviews from critics.

== Plot ==
The plot and gameplay of CSI is split into 5 distinct cases, each working alongside a member of the CSI team.

=== Case 1: "Inn and Out" ===
A showgirl is found tied, gagged, and strangled to death in a hotel room. Suspects in this case are the owners of a record of priors involving women, and a man who she not only had sex with, but passed along a STD. Players work with Gil Grissom.

=== Case 2: "Light my Fire" ===
Investigate an arson at the home of an aviation designer. Only suspects in this case are the man's rival, and a local drug dealer. Players work with Sara Sidle.

=== Case 3: "Garvey's Beat" ===
Players and Nick Stokes investigate the cop killing of an officer and the case is a match to an old cold case.

=== Case 4: "More Fun than a Barrel of Corpses" ===
A strange call to the lab leads to the discovery of a female body. The woman is the daughter of a casino owner. The only suspects were a doctor, who had an affair with the dead woman and a pharmacist, who is also a suspect, and the doctor's wife. Players work with Warrick Brown.

=== Case 5: "Leda's Swan Song" ===
Grissom disappears after having been called out to a previous crime scene – from the previous case. And the last murderer you arrested in the previous case is beginning to sing her victory. Players work with Catherine Willows for discovering the link between the suspect, Grissom and another victim's death.

== Reception ==
Reception

Aggregate scores
Aggregator	Score
GameRankings	64.10% (Win); 43.43% (Xbox)
Metacritic	61/100 (Win); 45/100 (Xbox)

Review scores
Publication	Score
Adventure Gamers	2/5
GameSpot	5.1/10
GameSpy	2/5
GameZone	8.3/10
IGN	8.2/10
The Electric Playground	7/10

The game was met with mixed reception. GameRankings and Metacritic gave it a score of 64.10% and 61 out of 100 for the PC version, and 43.43% and 45 out of 100 for the Xbox version.

=== Sales ===
In the United States, CSI: Crime Scene Investigation debuted at #3 on the NPD Group's computer game sales rankings for the week ending April 5, 2003. The title remain in the weekly top 10 through April 26, and became the country's seventh-best-selling computer game of April overall, with an average retail price of $30. It exited NPD's charts after a seventh-place finish for the week ending May 10. The computer version of CSI sold 172,000 copies worldwide by the end of June 2003, and 128,742 retail units in North America alone by year's end. Another 13,782 retail units sold in North America during the first two months of 2004. By April of that year, global sales of the computer version had reached 500,000 units. According to The Globe and Mail, one half of these buyers were female.

CSI's computer edition totaled 250,000 sales and $6.6 million revenues in the United States by August 2006. At the time, this led Edge to rank it as the country's 80th-best-selling computer game released since January 2000. In the United Kingdom, the Entertainment and Leisure Software Publishers Association (ELSPA) gave the game's computer version a "Silver" award, indicating sales of at least 100,000 copies in the region. It also received a "Gold" award from the Asociación Española de Distribuidores y Editores de Software de Entretenimiento (aDeSe), for more than 40,000 sales in Spain during its first 12 months. Combined domestic sales of all computer games in the CSI franchise, including CSI: Crime Scene Investigation, reached 520,000 copies by August 2006. The game and its first two sequels—CSI: Dark Motives and CSI: Miami—had surpassed 1.6 million units in global sales across all platforms by March 2006. The franchise rose to roughly 2.4 million worldwide sales by that December.
