= Frances Fisher filmography =

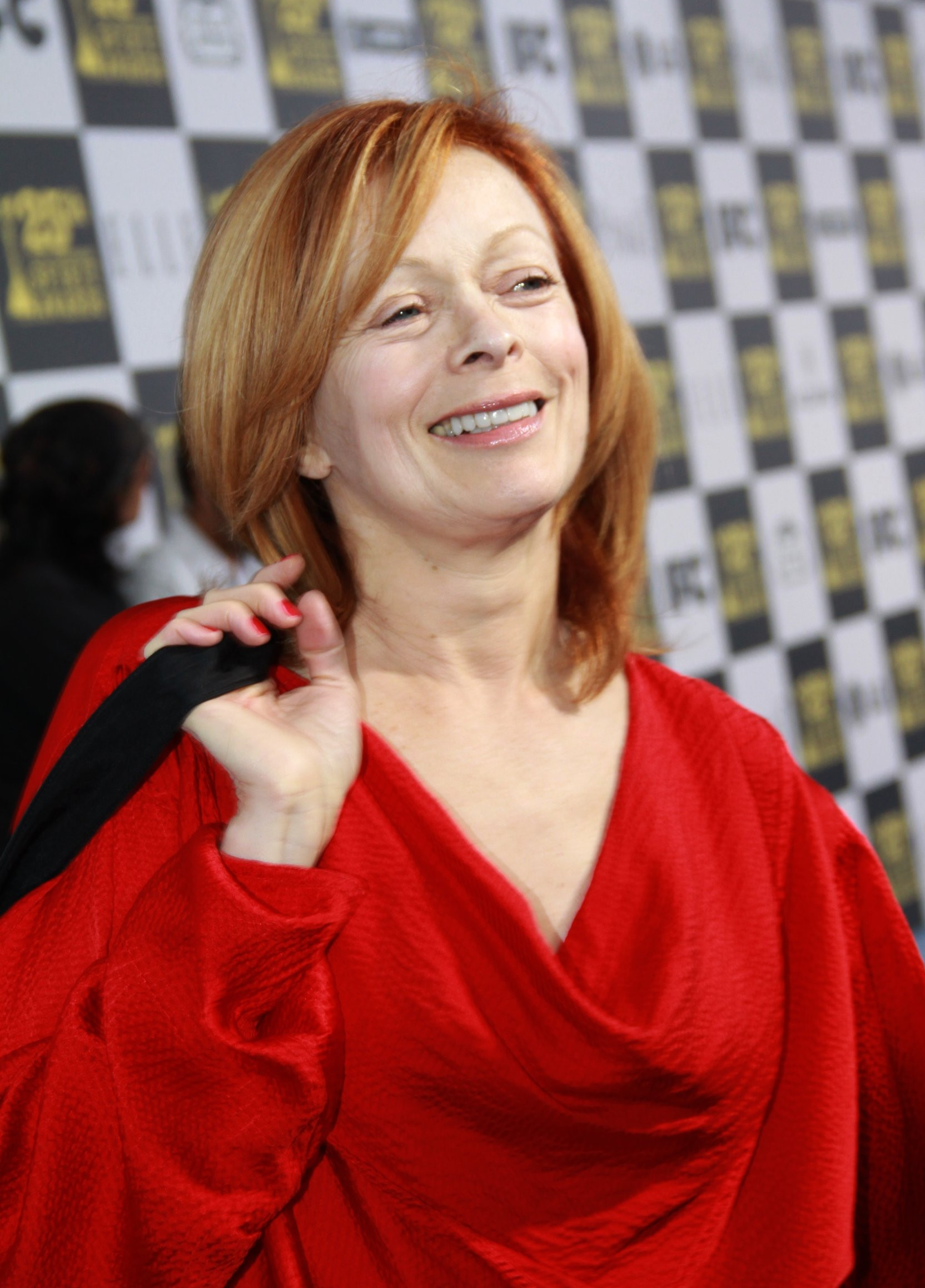
Fisher in 2010

British-born American actress Frances Fisher started her acting career in theater after moving to New York. She had a successful 14-year stage career in regional and off-Broadway productions before she was cast as Deborah Saxon in the television mystery crime drama series and soap opera The Edge of Night (1976–1981). She has appeared in numerous television series, including minor recurring roles on Guiding Light (1985), Becker (1999), Titus (2002), The Lyon's Den (2003), The Shield (2008), Eureka (2008), Touch (2013), Masters of Sex (2015–2016), and Watchmen (2019). She also had main roles in Strange Luck with D. B. Sweeney (1995), Glory Days with Eddie Cahill (2002), and Resurrection with Kurtwood Smith (2014–2015).

Fisher began acting in films in 1983 with a small role in Can She Bake a Cherry Pie? before going on to appearing in the films Pink Cadillac with Clint Eastwood (1989), Striptease with Demi Moore (1996), and Wild America with Jamey Sheridan (1997). In 1997, she was cast as Ruth DeWitt Bukater in the epic romance and disaster film Titanic, opposite Kate Winslet. The film itself earned significant critical and commercial success, and the role earned Fisher international recognition. She starred in the 2008 drama film Jolene opposite Jessica Chastain and had minor roles in The Lincoln Lawyer (2011), Laws of Attraction (2004), The Host (2013), You're Not You (2014), and Holidate (2020).

Fisher has also appeared in numerous television films including playing Lucille Ball in Lucy & Desi: Before the Laughter (1991), and Janet Lee Bouvier Auchincloss in Jackie Bouvier Kennedy Onassis (2000).

== Film ==
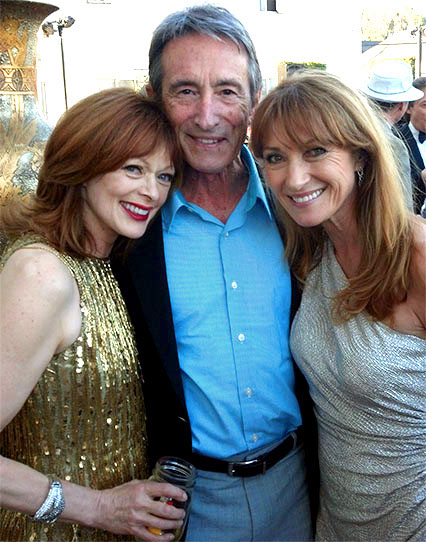
Fisher (left) with Richard Chaves and Jane Seymour in May 2013

Year	Title	Role	Notes	Ref.
1983	Can She Bake a Cherry Pie?	Louise		
1987	Tough Guys Don't Dance	Jessica Pond		
1987	Heart	Jeannie		
1988	Patty Hearst	Yolanda		
1988	Bum Rap	Phyllis		
1989	Lost Angels	Judith Loftis		
1989	Pink Cadillac	Dinah		
1990	Welcome Home, Roxy Carmichael	Rochelle Bossetti		
1991	L.A. Story	June		
1991	Frame Up	Jo Westlake		
1992	Unforgiven	Strawberry Alice		
1994	Babyfever	Rosie		
1994	Molly & Gina	Molly McKenna		
1994	Frame-Up II: The Cover-Up	Jo Baker		
1995	The Stars Fell on Henrietta	Cora Day		
1995	The Whiskey Heir	Deirdre	Short film	
1996	Female Perversions	Annunciata		
1996	Striptease	Donna Garcia		
1997	Trading Favors	Librarian		
1997	Wild America	Agnes Stouffer		
1997	Titanic	Ruth DeWitt Bukater		
1999	True Crime	D.A. Cecilia Nussbaum		
1999	The Big Tease	Candy		
1999	The Audrey Hepburn Story	Ella van Heemstra		
2000	Gone in 60 Seconds	Junie		
2001	The Rising Place	Virginia Wilder		
2002	Blue Car	Delia		
2003	House of Sand and Fog	Connie Walsh		
2004	Laws of Attraction	Sara Miller		
2006	The Night of the White Pants	Vivian Hagan		
2007	Sex and Death 101	Hope Hartlight		
2007	The Kingdom	Elaine Flowers		
2007	In the Valley of Elah	Evie		
2007	My Sexiest Year	Faye		
2008	Jolene	Cindy		
2008	A Single Woman	Narrator/Suffragist		
2009	The Perfect Game	Betty		
2010	Janie Jones	Lily Brand		
2010	Golf in the Kingdom	Eve Greene		
2011	The Roommate	Alison Evans		
2011	Sedona	Tammy		
2011	The Lincoln Lawyer	Mary Windsor		
2012	The Silent Thief	Candi Henderson		
2012	Any Day Now	Judge Meyerson		
2012	Beverly Hills Chihuahua 3: Viva la Fiesta!	Amelia James		
2012	Pandora's Box	Nicole	Short film	
2012	Retribution	Betty		
2012	The Perfect Fit	Overwhelmed Girl's Boss	Short film	
2012	Franny	Delores		
2013	The Host	Maggie		
2013	Plush	Camila		
2013	Red Wing	Momma B		
2014	The M Word	Carson Riley		
2014	You're Not You	Gwen		
2015	Woman in Gold	Barbara Schoenberg		
2016	Outlaws and Angels	Esther		
2016	An American Girl Story – Melody 1963: Love Has to Win	Miss Abbot	Direct-to-video	
2017	Another Kind of Wedding	Tammy Bergman		
2018	Shrimp	Marie	Short film	
2020	Holidate	Elaine		
2021	Grace and Grit	Mother		
2021	Awake	Doris		
2023	On Sacred Ground	Ricky		
2023	Reptile	Camille Grady		
2023	The King Tide	Faye		
2024	Rust	Lucas' great aunt		

Key
†	Denotes films that have not yet been released

== Television ==
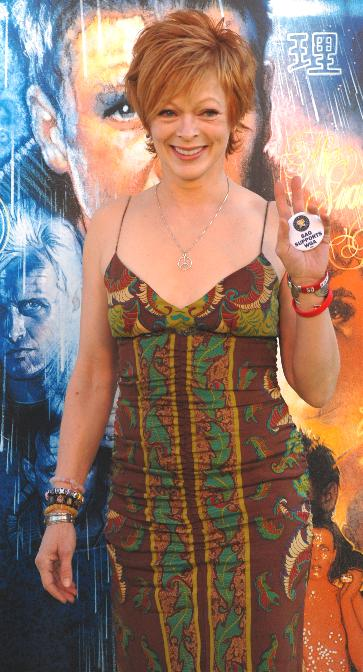
Fisher at the Jules Verne Adventure Film Special Awards Presentation in 2007

Year	Title	Role	Notes	Ref.
1976–1981	The Edge of Night	Deborah Saxon	245 episodes	
1985	Guiding Light	Suzette Saxon	3 episodes	
1986	The Equalizer	Amanda Kaufman	Episode: "Nightscape"	
1987	The Equalizer	Francesca	Episode: "Mission: McCall"	
1988	Roseanne	Savannah	Episode: "Here's to Good Friends"	
1989	Newhart	Libby	Episode: "Hi, Society"	
1989	Matlock	Nancy Proctor	2 episodes	
1989	CBS Summer Playhouse	Violet Coffin	Episode: "Elysian Fields"	
1989	In the Heat of the Night	Kate Morell	Episode: "Time of the Stranger"	
1991	The Young Riders	Clara Turner	Episode: "A House Divided"	
1993	Law & Order	Susan Boyd	Episode: "Animal Instinct"	
1995	Strange Luck	Angie	Main cast (17 episodes)	
1999	The Outer Limits	Lady Julia	Episode: "Ripper"	
1999	Becker	Dr. Elizabeth Carson	5 episodes	
2001	The X-Files	Lizzy Gill	Episode: "Essence"	
2002	Titus	Juanita Titus	3 episodes	
2002	Glory Days	Mitzi Dolan	Main cast (9 episodes)	
2003	The Lyon's Den	Brit Hanley	5 episodes	
2004	Boston Legal	Carrie	Episode: "Still Crazy After All These Years"	
2005	ER	Helen Kingsley	Episode: "Just as I Am"	
2005	Medium	Abigail Marsh	Episode: "I Married a Mind Reader"	
2006	Laws of Chance	Evelyn	Episode: #1.1	
2006	Grey's Anatomy	Betty Johnson	Episode: "Damage Case"	
2007	Saving Grace	Aunt Cathy	Episode: "Would You Want Me to Tell You?"	
2008	October Road	Ellen Daniels	Episode: "Hat? No Hat?"	
2008	The Shield	Rita	4 episodes	
2008	Cold Case	Rachel West '08	Episode: "Slipping"	
2008	Eureka	Eva Thorne	8 episodes	
2009	The Mentalist	Victoria Abner	Episode: "Red Scare"	
2010	Two and a Half Men	Priscilla Honeycutt	Episode: "Ixnay on the Oggie Day"	
2010	Private Practice	Ruby	Episode: "War"	
2010	The Good Guys	Helen Traynor	Episode: "Small Rooms"	
2010	Sons of Anarchy	Honey	Episode: "Home"	
2011	Days of Our Lives	Gladys Pierce	2 episodes	
2011	Torchwood: Miracle Day	The Mother	2 episodes	
2011	CSI: Crime Scene Investigation	Joanna Sapphire	Episode: "Maid Man"	
2012	A Gifted Man	Blanche Tipton	Episode: "In Case of Heart Failure"	
2012	Childrens Hospital	Headmistress	Episode: "British Hospital"	
2013	Touch	Nicole Farington	5 episodes	
2014	Castle	Matilda King	Episode: "Dressed to Kill"	
2014–2015	Resurrection	Lucille Langston	Main cast	
2014	Rectify	Peggy	Episode: "Donald the Normal"	
2014	The Killing	Gena Geddes	Episodes: "Dream Baby Dream" and "Truth Asunder"	
2015–2016	Masters of Sex	Edna Eshelman	4 episodes	
2016–2019	The Expanse	Elise Holden	Episodes: "Windmills" and "New Terra"	
2016	Criminal Minds	Antonia Slade	Episodes: "Devil's Backbone" and "The Storm"	
2017	Fargo	Vivian Lord	Episode: "The Law of Non-Contradiction"	
2018	Swedish Dicks	Warden Johnson	2 episodes	
2019	Watchmen	Jane Crawford	5 episodes	
2021	The Rookie	Evelyn Nolan	Episodes: "La Fiera" and "Sabotage"	
2021	The Sinner	Meg Muldoon	8 episodes	
2023	Capital Fall	Mrs. Porter	Episode: "An Unconventional Cruiseline"	

== Television films ==
Year	Title	Role	Notes	Ref.
1985	Broken Vows	Maureen Phelan		
1989	Cold Sassy Tree	Loma Williams		
1990	Sudie and Simpson	Mrs. Marge Allen		
1990	A Promise to Keep	Sarah		
1991	Lucy & Desi: Before the Laughter	Lucille Ball		
1992	Devlin	Maryellen		
1993	Praying Mantis	Betty		
1993	Attack of the 50 Ft. Woman	Dr. Theodora Cushing		
1995	The Other Mother: A Moment of Truth Movie	Carol Schaefer		
1999	Traffic	–		
2000	Jackie Bouvier Kennedy Onassis	Janet Lee Bouvier Auchincloss		
2001	Passion and Prejudice	Dr. Gwen Barry		
2005	Mrs. Harris	Marge Richey Jacobson		
2008	To Love and Die	Janet		
2010	Backyard Wedding	Eleanor Tyler		
2011	Partners	Colleen Scott		
2012	The Seven Year Hitch	Mrs. Von Hoffman		
2013	The Makeover	Allie Doolittle		
