= Piet Gerards =

Dutch graphic designer and publisher

Piet Gerards (Heerlen, 29 November 1950) is a Dutch graphic designer and publisher.

== Biography ==
Piet Gerards studied painting at the Academy of Applied Arts in Maastricht. In 1973 he broke off his studies and started manifesting himself as a designer and printer of activist printed matter.

In the 1980s, he founded two publishing houses, Gerards & Schreurs and Uitgeverij Huis Clos. He developed as a designer of literary books, by authors such as Louis Paul Boon, Gerard Reve, Vladimir Mayakovsky, Vladislav Khodasevich, Anatol Stern and Daniil Kharms. One of the characteristics of his book designs is the varied use of typefaces. Besides the use of classic typefaces like Bembo, Baskerville, Futura, Gill Sans and Neue Helvetica, Gerards turned out to be an advocate of the new Dutch digital typefaces such as Trinité (Bram de Does), Scala (Martin Majoor), Quadraat (Fred Smeijers), Caecilia (Peter Matthias Noordzij) and Offline (Roelof Mulder).

In 1985 he was the initiator of the Signe Arts Centre (Kunstencentrum Signe) in his home town of Heerlen, where he organised exhibitions and multidisciplinary projects devoted to the work of Andrei Tarkovsky, Stefan and Franciszka Themerson, Stanisław Ignacy Witkiewicz, Paul van Ostaijen and John Hejduk. He had a hand in numerous publications in the fields of visual arts, music, photography, design and history.

In the 1990s architecture became an important theme. He designed books on the work of Jo Coenen, P.J.H. Cuypers, Herman Hertzberger, Ben van Berkel, Wiel Arets and Hubert-Jan Henket for publishers such as 010, Netherlands Architecture Institute (NAi), SUN Publishing, Architectura & Natura, Birkhäuser, Lecturis and Ernst & Sohn. In 1993 his work was included in the exhibition Grafisch ontwerp uit de Limburgen.

In 2003 010 Publishers published the monograph Working Title: Piet Gerards, Graphic Designer, written by Ben van Melick. Three years later he settled in Amsterdam under the name ‘Piet Gerards Ontwerpers’. In his studio he organised a series of meetings under the name ‘25 chairs’: Marita Mathijsen, Bart Schneemann, Jan van Adrichem, Henk Hoeks, Bart Sorgedrager and Saskia Asser were some of the sixteen speakers who discussed their favourite ten books with the attendees.

He gave lectures about his work in Vienna, Raabs, Essen and Heerlen. In 2007 he initiated an exchange project between students from six Dutch art academies and twelve Romanian students from the Bucharest National University of Arts. In the academic year 2010-2011 he taught book typography at the Plantin Institute for Typography in Antwerp.

In 1993 his design of the book ‘Faces’ was acknowledged as the best designed book of the world for which he received a golden medal from Stiftung Buchkunst (German Book Art Foundation). Two years later he received the prestigious International Book Award from the American Institute of Architects for his book design ‘Berlin Nights’ from the American architect John Hejduk. As part of the ‘Best Book Design from All Over the World’ competition, organized annually by the Stiftung Buchkunst (German Book Art Foundation), a selection of his award-winning books was exhibited at the Shanghai International Book Design Arts Exhibition.

Before he decided to stop in 2018, he made an exhibition in the Province Hall Limburg: ‘Complot rond een vierkant. De goodwill-reeks van drukkerij Rosbeek 1969-2006’. Furthermore, he made exhibitions for Special Collections of the Amsterdam University Library (‘Afsetters en meester-afsetters. De kunst van het kleuren’) and for the Openbare Bibliotheek Amsterdam (‘25 years Huis Clos Publisher’). Now, living in Arnhem, The Netherlands, he occasionally designs under his own name. Gerards' oeuvre is included in various archives, including that of Museum Meermanno / House of the Book in The Hague.

== Awards ==
- The Best Book Designs (NL) / 35 awards between 1986 and 2017
- Schönste Bücher aus aller Welt, Leipzig (D) / honorary mention 1991, 1995, 2003, 2013 / golden medal 1993
- German prize for Communication Design, Essen (D) / Red Dot Award 1993, 1994, 1995, 1996, 1997, 2001, 2004
- American Institute of Architects, Washington (US) / International Architecture Book Award 1995
- PostNL/Collect, The Hague (NL) / Best designed stamp 2001
- International Society of Typographic Designers London (UK) / Award 2003, Premium award 2009, 2013
- Stichting De Gouden Ganzenveer (NL) / Ereveer (lifetime achievement) 2017

== Archives ==
The work of Piet Gerards has been included in various archives.

- Museum Meermanno / House of the Book, The Hague: complete works
- Special Collections of the Amsterdam University Library: Huis Clos Publishers, Golden goose quill (Gouden Ganzenveer), The Best Book Designs
- SHCL (Sociaal Historisch Centrum Limburg, Maastricht): Gerards & Schreurs Publishers
- City archive of Heerlen: Signe Arts Center (Kunstencentrum Signe)
