= Schelto van Heemstra (ambassador) =

Dutch diplomat (1941–2023)

Ambassador of the Netherlands to Spain
- In office 2003–2006

Ambassador of the Netherlands to Indonesia
- In office 1998–2003

Ambassador of the Netherlands to Suriname
- In office 17 June 1994 – 16 July 1998
- Preceded by: Pieter Koch
- Succeeded by: Ruud Treffers

Ambassador of the Netherlands to Argentina
- In office 1990–1994

Ambassador of the Netherlands to Zambia
- In office 1986–1990

Personal details
- Born: 6 January 1941 Arnhem, German-occupied Netherlands
- Died: 12 September 2023 (aged 82) Den Haag, Netherlands

Schelto Baron van Heemstra (Note: Sometimes spelled Schelte.) (6 January 1941 in Arnhem – 12 September 2023 in Den Haag) was a Dutch diplomat. He served as ambassador of the Netherlands to Zambia, Argentina, Suriname, Indonesia and Spain.

== Biography ==
Van Heemstra was born on 6 January 1941 in Arnhem. His family belongs to the Dutch nobility since 1814, and has a hereditary title of baron. His father was a diplomat, and he spent his childhood in many countries. In 1953, van Heemstra was sent to the Netherlands for an education, and graduated from the University of Utrecht. In 1968, he started to work for the Ministry of Foreign Affairs.

In 1986, van Heemstra received his first appointment as ambassador to Zambia. In 1990, he was transferred to Argentina.

His distant relative Aarnoud van Heemstra had been governor of Suriname, and van Heemstra applied to become the new ambassador. He was installed on 17 June 1994. During his time in Suriname, he presented a radio program for literature, and wrote a column in De Ware Tijd. In 1998, an Interpol arrest warrant for cocaine smuggling was issued for Desi Bouterse by the Dutch government, which cooled the relationship. On 16 July 1998, he left Suriname without an official reception or decorations, but with a simple handshake.

In 1998, van Heemstra was appointed ambassador to Indonesia, and in 2003, he was appointed to Spain. He retired in 2006. In 2001, he was awarded the Grand Cordon of the Honorary Order of the Palm by Surinamese President Venetiaan.

Schelto van Heemstra died on 12 September 2023 in Den Haag, at the age of 82.
