= Hiemstra =

Hiemstra is a Dutch language surname. Notable people with the surname include:

- Edmée Hiemstra (born 1970), Dutch water polo athlete
- Femke Hiemstra (born 1974), Dutch painter
- Gerrit Hiemstra
- Klaske Hiemstra (born 1954), Dutch writer
- Piet Hiemstra
- Rudolph Hiemstra (1912–2007), South African Air Force General

== See also ==
- Heemstra
