= Heemstra =

Heemstra is a Dutch surname. Notable people with the surname include:

- Howard Heemstra (1928–2011), American architect
- Jennifer Heemstra (pianist) (born about 1977), American pianist
- Jennifer M. Heemstra (fl. 2000), American chemistry professor
- Phil Heemstra (1941–2019), American-South African ichthyologist

== See also ==
- Van Heemstra
- Hiemstra
