= Jill Taylor (Home Improvement) =

- Home Improvement character
- Patricia Richardson as Jill Taylor
- First appearance: "Pilot"
- Last appearance: "The Long and Winding Road Part 3"
- Portrayed by: Patricia Richardson

In-universe information
- Alias: Jill Patterson; Jillian Patterson
- Family: Colonel Fred Patterson (father; deceased); Lillian Patterson (mother); Linda (sister); Tracy (sister); Carrie (sister); Robin (sister)
- Spouse: Tim Taylor
- Children: Brad Taylor; Randy Taylor; Mark Taylor

Jillian "Jill" Patterson Taylor is a character in the TV sitcom Home Improvement played by Patricia Richardson. Jill is Tim Taylor's wife. Jill and Tim raise their three sons (Brad, Randy, and Mark) together. Jill Taylor has appeared on critics' lists of "top TV" or "most memorable" moms. For this role, Richardson was nominated four times for Emmy Awards for Outstanding Lead Actress – Comedy Series and also received two nominations for the Golden Globe Award for Best Actress – Television Series Musical or Comedy.

== Development ==
The writers planned from the start that Tim Taylor's wife would have a strong voice. Frances Fisher was originally cast in the role, but was released during final rehearsals for the pilot as the audience viewed her portrayal of Jill as "whiny and pleading." Patricia Richardson was ultimately chosen as her replacement. Richardson had initially been reluctant to accept the role, concerned that Jill would be yet another "perfect" TV sitcom mother such as Clair Huxtable of The Cosby Show. She was reassured after seeing some scripts and talking to the series' producers. Early in the show's run, Richardson said, "What I want for this character is for her to be imperfect. I want her to make mistakes. I want her to be the wrong one in the relationship. I want her to blow it with Tim, and be the one who has to be punished. Because that's what life is like."

== Character biography ==
=== Background ===
Due to her father being in the Army, Jill and her four sisters grew up in a rigid environment. Jill and her siblings appear together in "Jill and Her Sisters" and "Taps".

=== Personality ===
It is established early in the series that Jill serves as the voice of reason for her husband and children. Jill is known for her common sense, but is also in-tune with her emotions; she has been described as "the epitome of understanding".

=== College and career ===
Throughout the course of the series, Jill goes from being a stay at home mother to a career-focused working woman. Early in the series, Jill frequently has problems finding employment; in the pilot episode of the series, she is passed over for a job even though she thought she nailed the interview. She has a brief career as a researcher for a magazine but is laid off after 2 years at the beginning of season 4. This is the catalyst for her decision to enroll back in graduate school, majoring in psychology.

=== Politics ===
Jill's feminism is emphasized throughout the series, especially in its latter seasons. She and Tim would sometimes argue about a man and woman's "place" in the household. Despite Tim's frequent reluctance to understand Jill's point of view, he usually tries to compromise with her.

It is also revealed in "Taps" that Jill is a Democrat. In other episodes, Jill mentions attending protest rallies as a young woman without her father's knowledge. However, being the daughter of an Army father has influenced her personality somewhat. For example, in "Tanks for the Memories", she exhibits great skill in driving a tank, despite the fact that she never drove a tank before.

== Cultural impact ==
The relationship between Jill and Tim Taylor has been discussed in academic papers about feminism. In May 2012, Jill was one of the 12 moms chosen by users of iVillage on their list of "Mommy Dearest: The TV Moms You Love".
