= Frances Fisher =

American actress (born 1952)

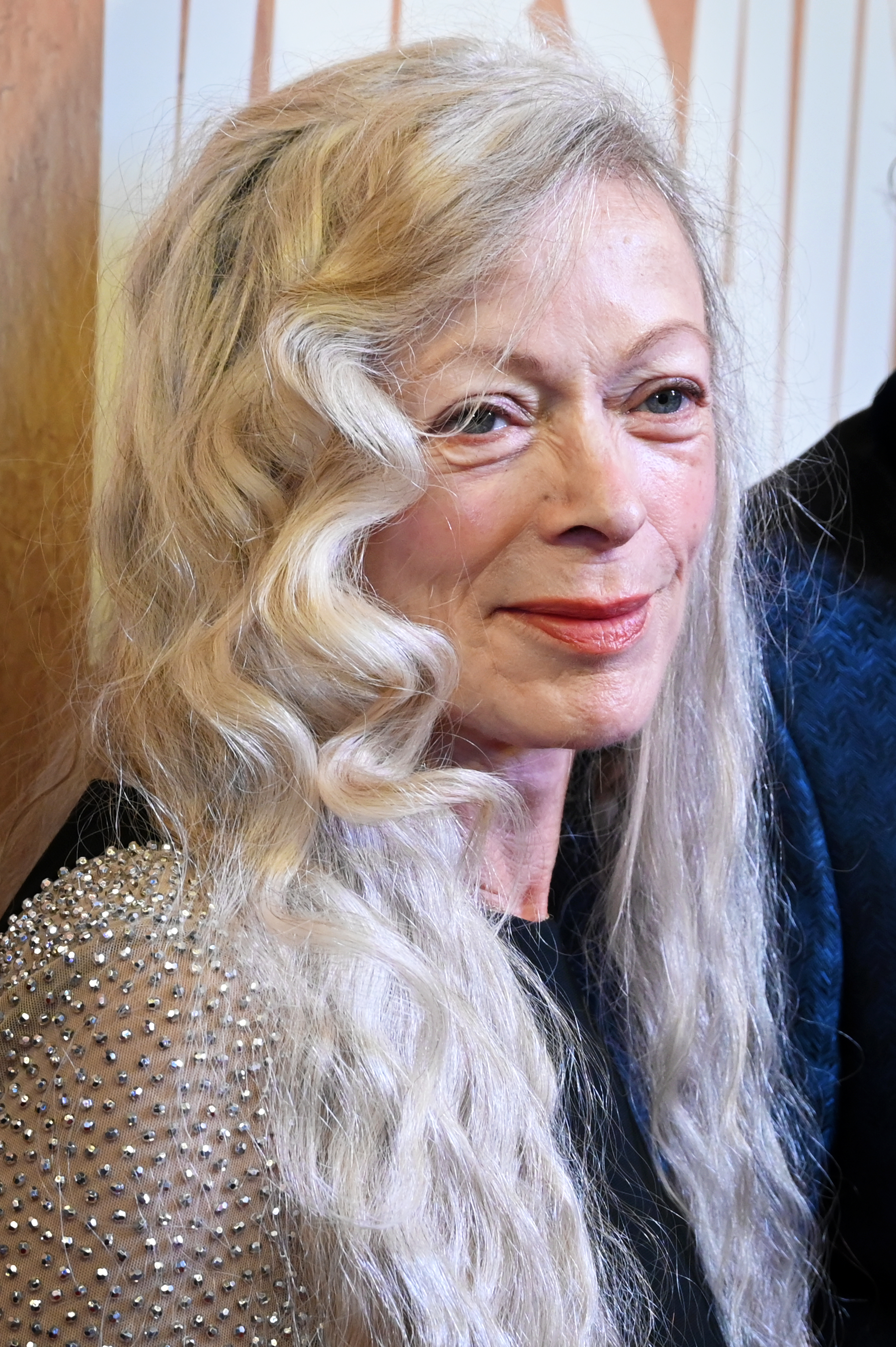
- Fisher in 2025
- Born: Frances Louise Fisher; May 11, 1952 (age 74); Milford on Sea, Hampshire, England
- Occupation: Actress
- Years active: 1976–present
- Works: Filmography
- Spouse: Billy Mack Hamilton (m. 1970; div. 1972)
- Partner: Clint Eastwood (1990–1995)
- Children: Francesca Eastwood
- Awards: HRIFF: Award of Excellence (2012)

Frances Louise Fisher (born May 11, 1952) is an American actress. She began her career in theater and later starred as Detective Deborah Saxon in the ABC daytime soap opera The Edge of Night (1976–1981). In film, she is known for her roles in Unforgiven (1992), Titanic (1997), True Crime (1999), House of Sand and Fog (2003), Laws of Attraction (2004), The Kingdom (2007), In the Valley of Elah (2007), Jolene (2008), The Lincoln Lawyer (2011), and The Host (2013). From 2014 to 2015, Fisher starred in the ABC drama series Resurrection. In 2019, she appeared in the HBO television series Watchmen, a sequel to the graphic novel of the same title.

== Early life and education ==
Fisher was born on May 11, 1952, in Milford on Sea, England, the daughter of American parents Olga Rosine (née Moen), a housewife, and William Irving "Bill" Fisher, Sr, an oil refinery construction superintendent. Her father was of Russian-Jewish and Hungarian-Jewish descent, whereas her mother was of Norwegian ancestry. Before she reached the age of 15, she had moved nine times and travelled because of her father's job, going to places including Italy, Turkey, Colombia, France, Canada, and Brazil.

When she was 15, her mother died and she took on the responsibility of raising her younger brother. She completed her high school at Lutcher Stark High School in Orange, Texas, where she performed in theater productions, and later worked as a secretary.

== Career ==
=== Theater ===
Deciding to follow her interest in theater, she moved to New York City, where she subsequently enjoyed a 14-year stage career in regional and off-Broadway productions. She became involved with the Actors Studio, where she studied with Lee Strasberg. Fisher moved to Abingdon, Virginia, where she began her acting career at the Barter Theatre, a year-round repertory theater.

During the next 10 years, she concentrated on theater in New York City and in regional theaters around the East Coast. She has also returned to theater; she appeared in Arthur Miller's last play, Finishing the Picture, produced at the Goodman Theatre in Chicago and in a 2006 production of The Cherry Orchard at the Mark Taper Forum in Los Angeles.

In 2015, she led the cast of My Child: Mothers of War in Los Angeles, and in 2019, she starred in the Laguna Playhouse production of The Lion in Winter with Gregory Harrison.

=== Television ===
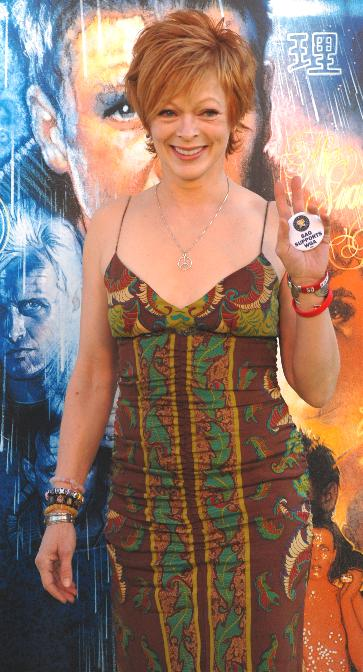
Fisher at the 2007 Jules Verne Adventure Film Special Awards Presentation

Fisher gained recognition playing Detective Deborah Saxon on the ABC daytime soap opera The Edge of Night from 1976 to 1981. She later joined the cast of CBS's Guiding Light as Suzette Saxon in 1985. After leaving daytime television, Fisher guest starred as a bartender, Savannah, at "The Lobo" in the first season of ABC comedy series Roseanne. She also appeared on Newhart, Matlock and In the Heat of the Night.

Fisher was originally cast to play Jill Taylor on the ABC sitcom Home Improvement, but was replaced after initial filming because producers felt that her pilot episode performance did not test well with the audience. She was cast in the unaired pilot to the short-lived 1992 ABC summer series Human Target (originally filmed in 1990, her role was recast by the time the series was picked up in October 1991, replaced by actress Signy Coleman).

In 1991, Fisher was cast as Lucille Ball in the television film Lucy & Desi: Before the Laughter, which aired to strong ratings and good reviews. From 1994 to 1995 she starred in the Fox drama series Strange Luck. In 2000, Fisher portrayed Audrey Hepburn's mother, Ella Hepburn, in the biographical film of the actress. In the same year she played the role of Janet Lee Bouvier in Jackie Bouvier Kennedy Onassis.

Fisher had recurring roles in the CBS sitcom Becker as Dr. Elizabeth "Liz" Carson from 1999 to 2000, and on Fox's Titus as Juanita Titus (2000–2001). In 2002 she starred in the short-lived The WB series Glory Days, and in 2003 starred in another drama cancelled after a single season, The Lyon's Den on NBC. In 2005, she appeared on the ER episode "Just As I Am," as Helen Kingsley, the long-lost birth mother of Dr. Kerry Weaver, played by Laura Innes, even though Fisher is only five years older. She also starred in a pilot for NBC/USA entitled To Love and Die. In 2008, she appeared in a recurring role on the Sci-Fi Channel television series Eureka, portraying the character Eva Thorne. Fisher also guest-starred on Grey's Anatomy, The Shield, Two and a Half Men, Private Practice, Sons of Anarchy, Torchwood: Miracle Day, CSI: Crime Scene Investigation, Cold Case, and Castle.

In 2014, Fisher was starring in the ABC drama series Resurrection about the residents of Arcadia, Missouri, whose lives are upended when their loved ones return from the dead, unaged since their deaths. She played the role of Lucille Langston.

In 2017, she and her daughter Francesca Eastwood both starred in the acclaimed Fargo episode "The Law of Non-Contradiction" as the older and younger versions of actress Vivian Lord.

In 2019, she starred in the HBO television series Watchmen, a sequel to the graphic novel of the same name.

=== Film ===
Fisher made her film debut in Can She Bake a Cherry Pie? (1983) and later appeared in Patty Hearst directed by Paul Schrader. In 1989 she appeared in Pink Cadillac opposite Clint Eastwood, and the pair began an offscreen relationship. The following year she appeared in Welcome Home, Roxy Carmichael.

In 1992, Fisher had her break-out role in Unforgiven, an Academy Award-winning film directed by Clint Eastwood, who also starred. In later years she began acting regularly in major and independent films. Her most famous role in film was as the society matron Ruth DeWitt Bukater, the mother of the character played by Kate Winslet, in the 1997 blockbuster Titanic. She appeared in True Crime (1999) with Eastwood as D.A., and Gone in 60 Seconds (2000) as Junie, the wife of the character played by Robert Duvall.

Fisher had a role in House of Sand and Fog (2003), another Academy Award-nominated film. In 2004, she appeared in Laws of Attraction as Julianne Moore's mother, even though she is only eight years older. Fisher worked on four films in 2006, including Peter Berg's The Kingdom, and Paul Haggis' In the Valley of Elah. The same year, she appeared in the film Jolene with Jessica Chastain as her lover. She served as an official festival judge for the 2011 Noor Iranian Film Festival in Los Angeles. In 2011, she appeared in The Lincoln Lawyer and The Roommate.

Fisher appeared as Maggie Stryder in the 2013 film The Host with Saoirse Ronan and William Hurt. She also appeared in the films The Potters and You're Not You, both released in 2014.

Fisher appeared in the film Woman in Gold (2015), playing the mother of Randol Schoenberg (Ryan Reynolds).

== Political activities ==
Fisher has been described as a progressive Democrat. She has served as SAG-AFTRA Los Angeles Chapter's first vice-president, as well as a member of the Screen Actors Guild National Board of Directors since 2004 (before its merger with AFTRA) and after the merger.

In the 2014 United States House of Representatives elections in California, Fisher endorsed and campaigned for Independent candidate for district 33, Marianne Williamson, an author and founder of Project Angel Food. Fisher later endorsed Williamson for her 2020 presidential campaign and again for her 2024 presidential campaign.

In the 2016 Democratic Party presidential primaries, Fisher endorsed and canvassed for U.S. Senator Bernie Sanders. Later that same year, on Jane Fonda's 79th birthday, Fisher, Fonda, Lily Tomlin, and Catherine Keener marched alongside labor leader Dolores Huerta in support of the Standing Rock protest against the Dakota Access Pipeline. In 2022, she was cast in On Sacred Ground, a movie set during the protest.

In August 2019, Fisher jokingly called for U.S. President Donald Trump, who is a SAG-AFTRA member and whom she had previously called "the biggest bully in the world", to vote for the union election's opposition MembershipFirst slate, in a bid to mobilize all the union members, regardless of whether they are Democrat, Republican, or Independent, to cast their ballots to have their voices heard.

In 2021, after Ed Asner and nine other SAG-AFTRA members filed a lawsuit against SAG-AFTRA over alleged wage discrimination, Fisher and her co-plaintiffs filed a "similar" lawsuit alleging that the union had deceived members into agreeing to Collective Bargaining Agreements that reduced healthcare benefits for retirees and their families. The co-plaintiffs included fellow actors David Andrews, Belinda Balaski, Stephen R. Hart, and Anne Lockhart. In July 2022, after the lawsuit was previously dismissed without prejudice in July 2021 and amended, Judge Christina A. Snyder dismissed the lawsuit with prejudice.

== Personal life ==
In 1970, when Fisher was 18, she married her high school sweetheart Billy Mack Hamilton. They divorced two years later.

Fisher was in a relationship with Unforgiven co-star Clint Eastwood in the early-to-mid-1990s. During that time, the couple had a daughter, Francesca (b. 1993).

After her split from Eastwood, Fisher dated fellow actor George Clooney in 1995.

Fisher has explained that finding a boyfriend was difficult while raising a child on her own. She stated in 2010 that "as a single mom, you know, it's been a different thing. No gentleman callers."
