= My Child: Mothers of War =

My Child: Mothers of War is a film and play that told the stories of mothers impacted by their children who served in the military in Iraq and Afghanistan.

The 2015 play, adapted from a 2006 documentary of the same name by Angeliki Giannakopoulos, debuted at the Hudson Theatre in Los Angeles following a reading in 2011 timed for the tenth anniversary of September 11. It starred: Frances Fisher, Mimi Rogers, Monique Edwards, Melina Kanakaredes and Laura Ceron.

The documentary, which ran on PBS, earned Director's Choice at the 2006 Cinequest Film Festival and Best Documentary Award at La Femme Film Festival.
