= The Audrey Hepburn Story =

2000 television film biopic directed by Steven Robman

- DVD cover
- Genre: Biography; Drama
- Written by: Marsha Norman
- Directed by: Steven Robman
- Starring: Jennifer Love Hewitt; Frances Fisher; Eric McCormack
- Composer: Lawrence Shragge
- Country of origin: United States
- Original language: English

Production
- Executive producers: Robert Greenwald; Kimberly Rubin
- Producers: Steven Robman; Kay Hoffman
- Production location: Montréal
- Cinematography: Pierre Letarte
- Editor: Peter B. Ellis
- Running time: 96 minutes
- Production companies: Robert Greenwald Productions; Endemol Entertainment
- Budget: $7 million

Original release
- Network: ABC
- Release: March 27, 2000

The Audrey Hepburn Story is a 2000 American biographical drama television film based on the life of actress and humanitarian Audrey Hepburn. Covering the years 1935 to the 1960s, it stars Jennifer Love Hewitt, who also produced the film. Emmy Rossum and Sarah Hyland appear as Hepburn in her early years. The film was shot in Montreal, Canada, and premiered on ABC on March 27, 2000.

== Plot ==
The making of Breakfast at Tiffany's serves as a framing device for the film. Audrey's life up to that point is seen in elongated flashbacks.

During Audrey's childhood, her Nazi-sympathizer father abandons her and her mother, Ella. Audrey is sent to an English boarding school, where she becomes passionate about ballet. When Britain enters World War II, Audrey returns to live with Ella in the neutral Netherlands. The Nazis invade, leading to years of hardship. When the nation is liberated, UNICEF provides resources to the starved populous.

After the war, Audrey studies ballet in London, but doesn't have the talent to become a prima ballerina. To make ends meet, she dances in musicals and revues. This leads to small parts in several films. She gets engaged to the wealthy industrialist James Hanson, who emotionally supports her career to a degree.

While filming Monte Carlo Baby in 1951, Audrey is scouted by Colette to star in the Broadway play Gigi. During the production, she is coached in acting by playwright Anita Loos. Realizing that she wants to devote herself to her career, Audrey breaks off her engagement with Hanson.

Audrey's leading role in the 1953 film Roman Holiday catapults her to stardom. While filming Sabrina, she falls in love with married costar William Holden. He proposes marriage, but she declines when he reveals that he had an irreversible vasectomy. Despite suffering heartbreak, Sabrina is another professional success for Audrey.

Actor Mel Ferrer and Audrey costar in the play Ondine on Broadway. She wins the Academy Award for Best Actress for Roman Holiday. Shortly afterwards, she and Mel marry and move to Switzerland. She is kept busy making the films Funny Face, Love in the Afternoon, and The Nun's Story.

While filming The Nun's Story in Stanleyville, Belgian Congo, Audrey learns about the area's lack of access to good medical care. She questions the value of her work as an actress. Mel insists that her movies matter to millions of people.

While filming The Unforgiven, a pregnant Audrey falls from a horse, injuring her back. While in the hospital, she receives a letter from her estranged father and learns that Ella hid his other letters from her. Distraught, Audrey miscarries.

After recovering, she travels to Ireland to see her father. The visit is short and he has no desire to meet again. A dejected Audrey reconciles with Ella. Audrey takes a hiatus from acting to have her and Mel's son, Sean Hepburn Ferrer. She is offered the role of Holly Golightly in Breakfast at Tiffany's, but turns it down due concerns about playing a wild "call girl." Mel convinces her the role is worth taking.

While preparing to film the final scene of Breakfast at Tiffany's, Audrey theorizes that Holly abandoning her cat symbolizes how she feels about herself: lost and un-loveable. When Holly finds the cat again, she is accepting herself. Audrey's insight gains her the respect of Truman Capote, the cantankerous writer of the novella on which the film is based. After filming the final scene in one take, everyone celebrates.

The closing text mentions several of Audrey's films after Breakfast at Tiffany's, and her second son Luca Dotti. Later in life, she became a UNICEF ambassador, and there is footage of the real Hepburn during one of her UNICEF missions. She died of cancer in 1993.

== Cast ==
- Jennifer Love Hewitt as Audrey Hepburn
  - Emmy Rossum as Audrey, ages 12–16
  - Sarah Hyland as Audrey, age 8
- Frances Fisher as Baroness Ella van Heemstra
- Keir Dullea as Joseph Hepburn-Ruston
- Gabriel Macht as William Holden
- Peter Giles as James Hanson, Baron Hanson
- Eric McCormack as Mel Ferrer
- Seana Kofoed as Kay Kendall
- Michael J. Burg as Truman Capote
- Marcel Jeannin as Hubert de Givenchy
- Lenie Scoffié as Colette
- Ray Landry as Humphrey Bogart
- Sam Stone as William Wyler
- Swede Swensson as Gregory Peck
- Peter Feder as Billy Wilder
- Joan Copeland as Cathleen Nesbitt
- Adam MacDonald as Nick Dana

== Production ==
Producer Kimberly Rubin sought to make a film that explored Hepburn's life in detail, beginning with her childhood and World War II experiences up to her success on stage and in film. She halted the script after the birth of Hepburn's first child, due to the age of her lead actress. Jennifer Love Hewitt, who was 20 at the time of the filming, and "[W]e would not be able to successfully age her past 33", Rubin explained. Hewitt had been recommended for the role by director Steven Robman, who had previously directed her in Party of Five.

The $7 million production was filmed on location in Montreal between April 13 and May 29, 1999. Nearly 80 roles were cast. Canadian professionals involved with the film included Jean-Baptiste Tard, production design; Renée April, costume design; and Pierre Letarte, director of photography.

== Release ==
Several versions of the film were aired. In the United States, it aired as a three-hour film on ABC on March 27, 2000, while in other countries, a longer version was broadcast over two nights.

== Reception ==
Critical reviews noted that the film overcame several potential pitfalls, including the usual insipidness of television movies and the difficulty of mounting a biopic of a revered actress who had died only seven years earlier. Entertainment Weekly wrote that Jennifer Love Hewitt had "guts" to take on the role, and called her "excellent at conveying Hepburn's studied modesty". While the review describes the other actors as "a cast of impersonators who are mostly much worse than herself [Hewitt]", it sums up the film as a "corny, curious, but achingly sincere and fitfully enjoyable TV movie".

Variety praised the performances of the two young actresses who played Hepburn as a youth, Sarah Hyland and Emmy Rossum, saying they gave "depth and likability" to Hepburn's character and gave Hewitt, who plays Hepburn as an adult, "a ball that's already rolling". This review commended Hewitt for her "onscreen maturity". The Apollo Guide called the screenplay "a mildly pleasant surprise" for a television film and praised Hewitt's performance for conveying the "mannerisms and accent" of Hepburn without taking on a full-blown impersonation. It reserved its greatest praise for Rossum's performance, which "demonstrates both her [Hepburn's] heart and the development of her strength of character and explains, in part, why she was unique". A Moviehole.com review agreed that Hewitt conveyed "both the look, and the voice" of Hepburn, but disliked the script for presenting such a large number of scenes in Hepburn's life rather than the "most gripping" ones.

Negative reviews focused on Hewitt's inability to portray Hepburn's physical qualities. According to The Baltimore Sun review: "What's impossibly wrong with this film is that Hewitt has no physical grace while Hepburn was the very embodiment of it. ... Director Steve Robman ... has to use every trick from slow motion to shooting only legs and arms of body-doubles to make it look as though Hewitt could have been a ballerina". Radio Times noted the incongruity of the "buxom" actress portraying the gamine Hepburn. On Rotten Tomatoes the film has an approval rating of 20% based on reviews from 5 critics.
