= Aarnoud van Heemstra =

Dutch nobleman, jurist and politician (1871–1957)

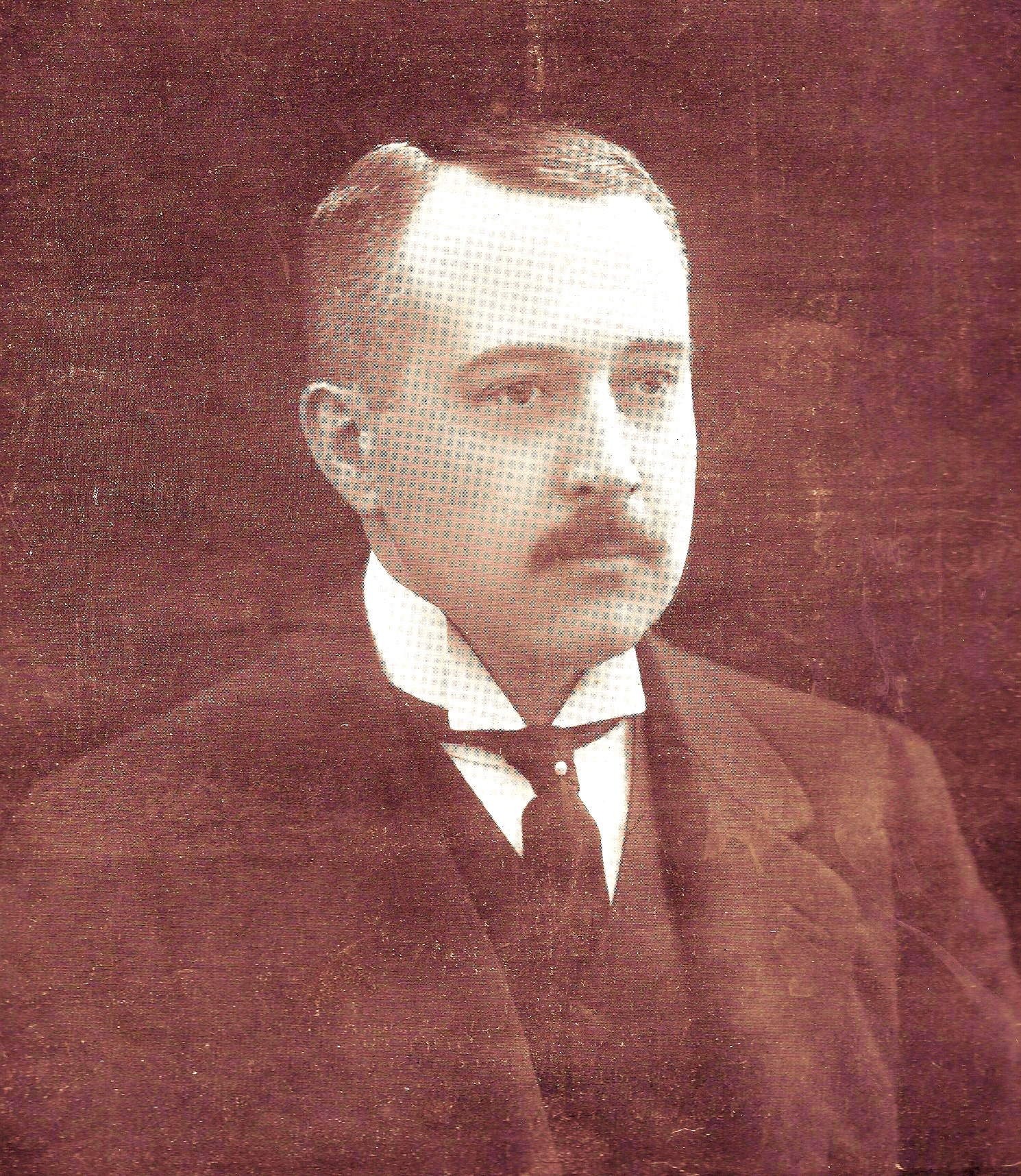
- Heemstra in 1920

Governor-General of Suriname
- In office 23 May 1921 – 21 May 1924
- Preceded by: L. J. Rietberg
- Succeeded by: L. J. Rietberg
- In office 21 February 1925 – 1 April 1928
- Preceded by: Jan Luchies Nysingh
- Succeeded by: Bram Rutgers

Personal details
- Born: 22 July 1871 Vreeland, Netherlands
- Died: 30 December 1957 (aged 86) Arnhem, Netherlands
- Spouses: Elbrig Willemine Henriette Baroness van Asbeck (m. 1896; died 1939) Anna Eliza Roosenburg (m. 1947)
- Children: 6, including Ella van Heemstra
- Relatives: Audrey Hepburn (granddaughter)

Aarnoud Jan Anne Aleid Baron van Heemstra (22 July 1871 in Vreeland – 30 December 1957 in Arnhem) was a Dutch nobleman, jurist and politician. He served as mayor of Arnhem between 1910 and 1920, and Governor-General of Suriname from 1921 until 1928. Van Heemstra was the grandfather of Audrey Hepburn.

== Life and career ==
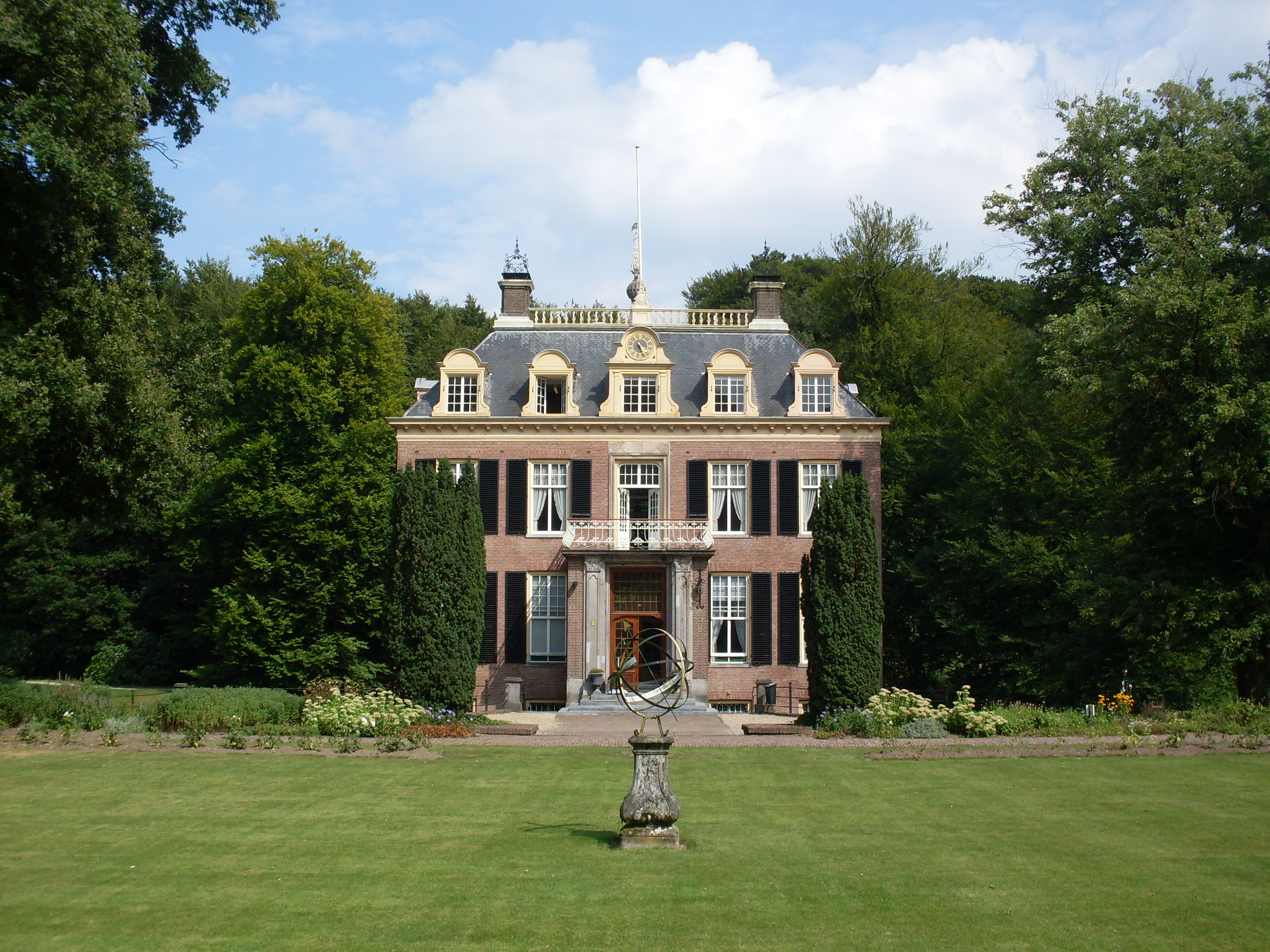
Huis Zypendaal

He was a member of the Van Heemstra family and was born in Vreeland, the son of Wilhelmina Cornelia (née de Beaufort, 1843–1927) and Willem Hendrik Johan Baron van Heemstra (1841–1909), the mayor of Loenen. He studied at Utrecht University where he obtained his doctorate in law in 1896.

Van Heemstra established himself in Arnhem where he was prosecuting lawyer. In 1902 he was appointed official at the district court in Roermond and in October 1909 deputy public prosecutor at the arrondissement court of Maastricht. In 1910 he became mayor of the city of Arnhem. He resigned in 1920 after a budget dispute, and was succeeded by Dirk Jan de Geer.

In 1921, van Heemstra was appointed governor of Suriname by Queen Wilhelmina. He started to focus on the economy of the colony, and develop the potential of the bauxite reserves. In 1922, Alcoa opened the first bauxite factory in Moengo. He tried to attract German mining companies, but was blocked by the States General of the Netherlands. In May 1924, he applied for a short leave, but did not return until 23 January 1925. He was reinstalled on 21 February 1925. There were several conflicts with the Estates of Suriname who called for his resignation. In 1928, he resigned as governor after a conflict with the States General.

Van Heemstra returned to the Arnhem region, and became editor-in-chief of Politiek Economisch Weekblad, a political economic magazine published until 1940. He was originally pro-German and pro-Japan, however during the late 1930s, he started to change his mind.

Van Heemstra refused to collaborate with the NSB during World War II. In 1942, the German occupiers confiscated most of his possessions, including his estate Huis Zypendaal. He moved to Oosterbeek and later Velp. On 15 August 1942, his son-in-law Otto graaf van Limburg Stirum was executed in retaliation for a sabotage by the resistance movement. After this, his widowed daughter Miesje (1897–1987) and his divorced daughter Ella (1900–1984) lived with him in Velp, along with Ella's youngest child, the future actress Audrey Hepburn (1929–1993).

Van Heemstra died in Arnhem on 30 December 1957, at the age of 86.

== Family ==
In 1896, he married Elbrig Willemine Henriette Baroness van Asbeck (1873–1939), who was a granddaughter of Dirk van Hogendorp. They had six children:

- Wilhelmina Cornelia (Miesje) Baroness van Heemstra (1897–1987), married to Otto Graaf van Limburg Stirum (1893–1942)
- Geraldine Caroline Baroness van Heemstra (1898–1965)
- Ella Baroness van Heemstra (1900–1984), mother of actress Audrey Hepburn
- Marianne Jacqueline Baroness van Heemstra (1903–1991), lady-in-waiting to Princess and later Queen Juliana of the Netherlands
- Willem Hendrik Johan Baron van Heemstra (1907–1978)
- Arnoudina Johanna Baroness van Heemstra (1911–1975)

In 1947, eight years after the death of his first wife, Van Heemstra married a second time, to Anna Eliza Roosenburg (1901–1988). They remained married until his death in 1957.

== Honours ==
- Knight of the Order of the Netherlands Lion
- Commander of the Order of Orange-Nassau
- Grand Officer of the Order of the House of Orange
