= Molen van Vledder =

Windmill in Vledder, Netherlands

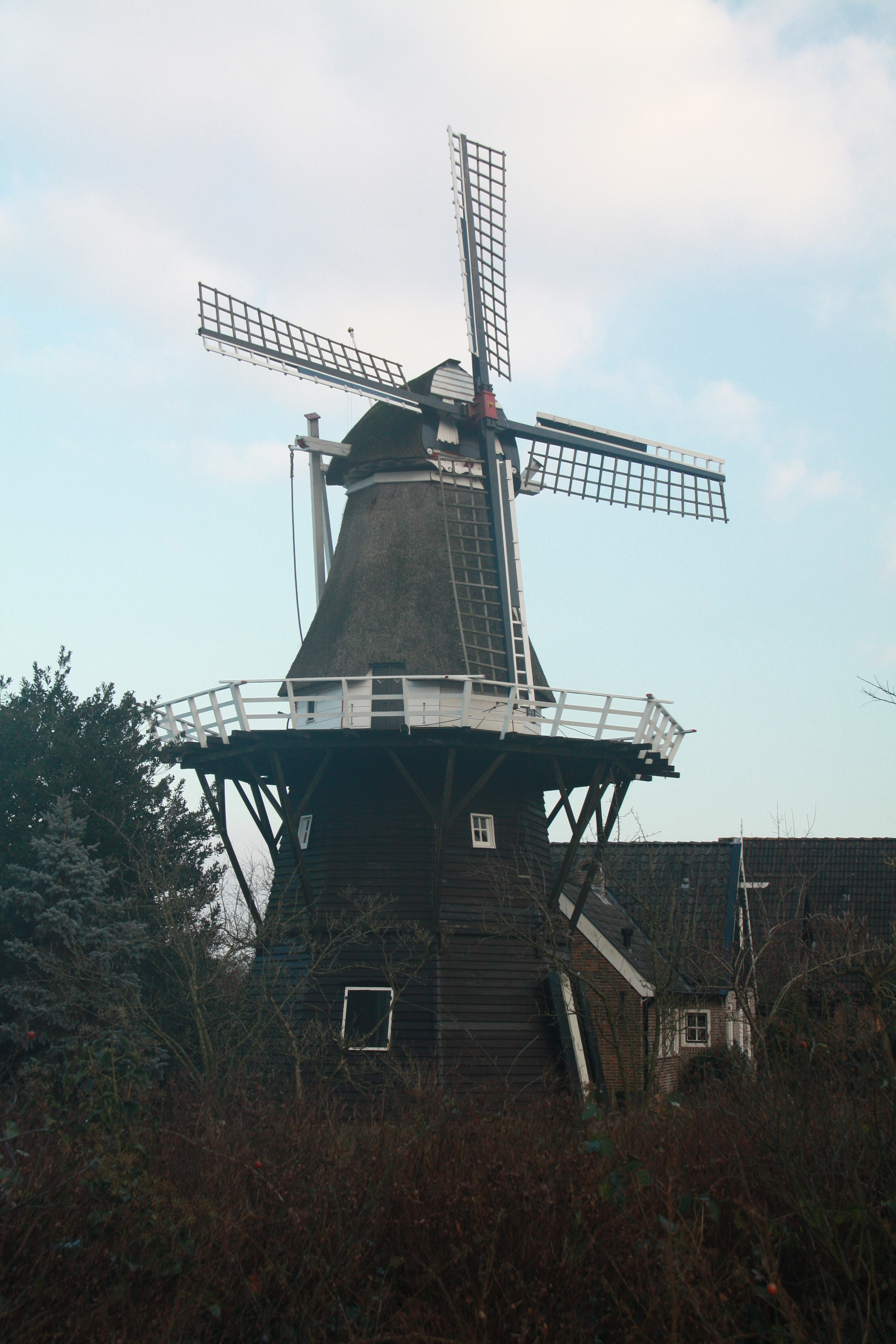
- Molen van Vledder, January 2009
- Interactive map of Molen van Vledder

Origin
- Mill name: Nooitgedacht
- Mill location: De Bree 1, 8381 VS Vledder
- Coordinates: 52°51′34″N 6°12′55″E
- Operator: Private
- Year built: 1968

Information
- Purpose: Corn mill
- Type: Smock mill
- Storeys: Two-storey smock
- Base storeys: Three-storey base
- Smock sides: Eight sides
- No. of sails: Four sails
- Type of sails: Common sails
- Windshaft: Steel
- Winding: Tailpole and winch
- No. of pairs of millstones: One pair
- Size of millstones: 1.00 metre (3 ft 3 in)

The Molen van Vledder is a smock mill in Vledder, Drenthe, which is used as holiday accommodation. The mill was built in 1968 and is listed as a Rijksmonument, number 357823.

== History ==
A mill stood on this site until 1958. In 1968, the present mill was built by millwright J D Medendorp of Zuidlaren, incorporating parts from two demolished mills. The 1877-built drainage mill De Kooi, Kantens, Groningen which had been demolished in 1961 and the 1862-built drainage mill Gebroeders Bos, which stood at Hoogkerk, Groningen and was demolished in 1963. The mill is used as a holiday home.

== Description ==
The Molen van Vledder is what the Dutch describe as an "achtkante stellingmolen". It is a two-storey smock mill with a stage on a three-storey brick base. The stage is at second-floor level, 6.20 metres (20 ft 4 in) above ground level. The smock and cap are thatched. The mill is winded by a tailpole and winch. The four Common sails have a span of 11.20 metres (36 ft 9 in) and are carried in a steel windshaft. The windshaft also carries the brake wheel which has 31 cogs. This drives the wallower (24 cogs) at the top of the upright shaft. At the bottom of the upright shaft, the great spur wheel, which has 58 cogs, drives the 1.00 metre (3 ft 3 in) diameter French Burr stones via a lantern pinion stone nut with 31 staves.
