= Klaske Hiemstra =

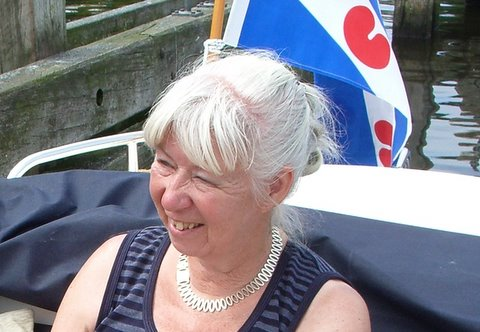
Klaske Hiemstra

Klaske Hiemstra (born February 24, 1954, in Vledder, Netherlands) is a West Frisian-language writer.

As a child of Frisian parents, Hiemstra grew up bilingual. From the age of eight, she published in Dutch in the children's section of the Frisian newspaper Friese Koerier. Studying Dutch language and literature at university, she chose modern West Frisian literature as her secondary specialisation.

Hiemstra started to write in the West Frisian language in 1997, when she was asked to be a member of It Skriuwersboun, the Frisian writers' association. Since 31 December 2009 she has been a columnist at the news site of the Ried fan de Fryske Beweging, the Council of the Frisian Movement.

== Publications ==
=== Novels ===
- Retoer Skylge (2004), an autobiographical novel about the phenomenon of “images out of the unconsciousness”.
- It rinnen fan Silke (2006), a novel about a girl who is studying law in Groningen and has to come to terms with her mother's fatal disease. She does everything possible to dispel the feeling of loss of control.

=== Fairy tales ===
- De bok, it gouden aai en de sân ravens: trije ferhalen (1996) contains three stories by different authors. Hiemstra won the third prize with "It lân fan altyd snein". Translated into Dutch, German and English.
- "Eilânreis" (2007) is a fairytale of two young sisters' quest to find their mother. One of them is mentally handicapped.

=== Poetry ===
- De skaadfrou (2003).
