= Zypendaal House =

Mansion in the Arnhem, Netherlands

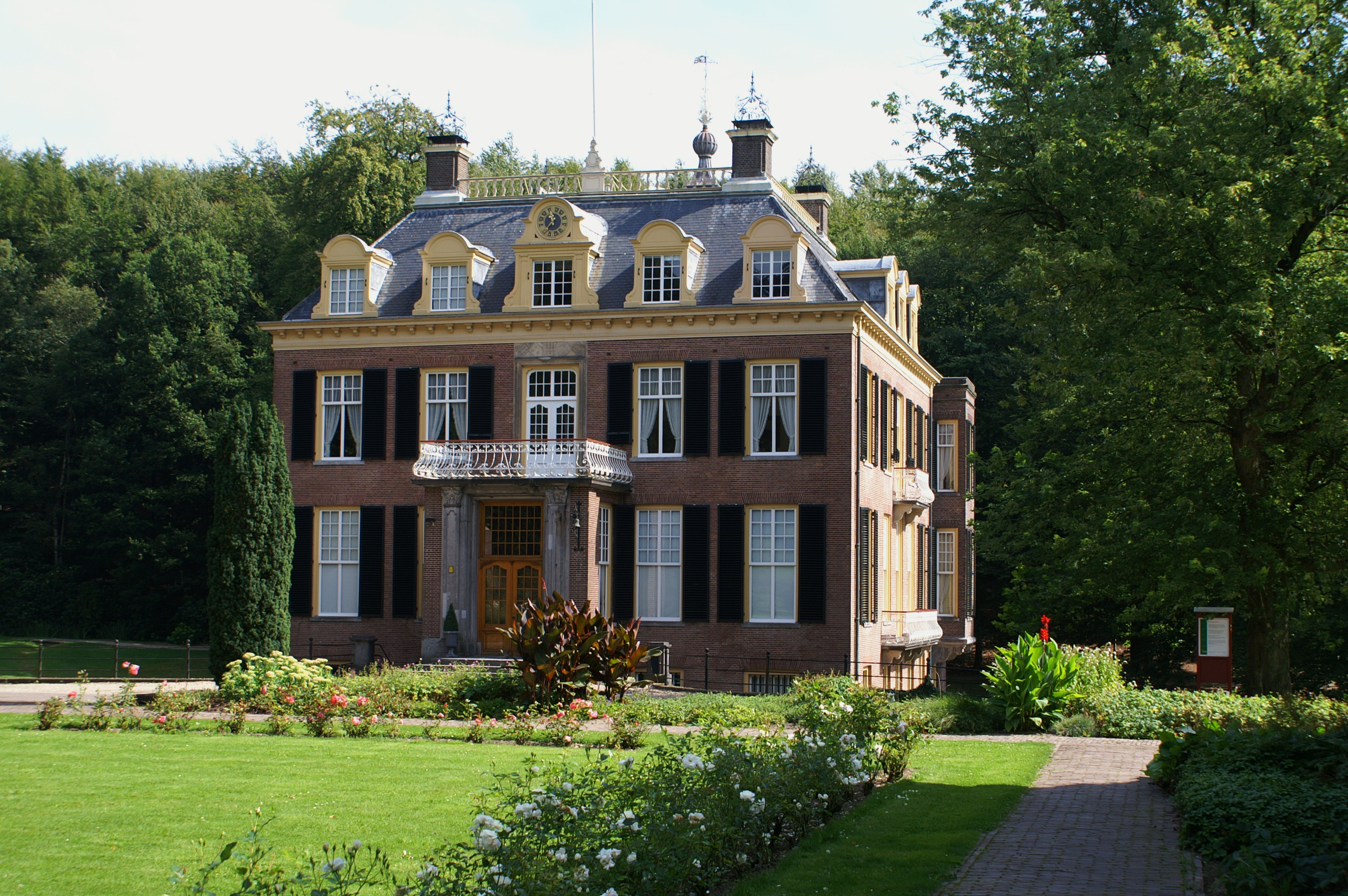
- The house in 2009.

General information
- Status: Active
- Type: Private residence House museum
- Location: Zypendaalseweg 44 6814 CL; Arnhem, Netherlands
- Coordinates: 51.9993°N 5.8931°E
- Owner: Brantsen family (former)

Zypendaal House (Dutch: Huis Zypendaal) is a historic mansion in Arnhem in Gelderland, Netherlands. It operates as a historic house museum.

== History ==
Zupendaal was built in 1762. It was owned by the wealthy Brantsen family.

The mansion was later leased to Baron Aarnoud van Heemstra, a Dutch politician and the grandfather of Audrey Hepburn. The Nazis confiscated the property from van Heemstra in 1942, during the German occupation of the Netherlands in World War II.

The home is now run as a house museum, with the ground floor open to the public.
