= Van Heemstra =

Dutch noble family

van Heemstra
- noble family
- Country: Netherlands
- Founded: 16th century
- Founder: Taeck Obbema Heemstra
- Titles: Baron

Van Heemstra is a family that belongs to the Dutch nobility.

== History ==
The family is of Frisian origin. The genealogy of the family begins with Taecke Obbema Heemstra, mentioned as a voting representative (nobleman) in Oostergo in 1492. After the founding of the Kingdom of the Netherlands in November 1813, the Frisian nobility was integrated. In 1814 the Van Heemstra family was recognized as belonging to Dutch nobility with the title of baron.

== Notable members ==
- Schelto van Heemstra (1807–1864), Dutch politician.
- Aarnoud van Heemstra (1871–1957), Dutch lawyer and politician.
- Ella van Heemstra (1900–1984), Dutch-British socialite and mother of Audrey Hepburn.
- Audrey Hepburn (4 May 1929 – 20 January 1993), Belgian-born British actress, humanitarian and presenter.
- Schelto van Heemstra (6 January 1941 – 12 September 2023), Dutch diplomat and ambassador

== Coat of arms ==
The coat of arms of the family is in blue a golden eagle.

== See also ==
- Heemstra

== Literature ==
- T. Voerman, Van Heemstra, genealogische aantekeningen betreffende het geslacht van Heemstra tot het eind der 19e eeuw, Amsterdam, 1989. (in Dutch)
- Nederlands Adelsboek, jaargang 84, The Hague, 1994. (in Dutch)
