= Melina Kanakaredes =

American actress (born 1967)

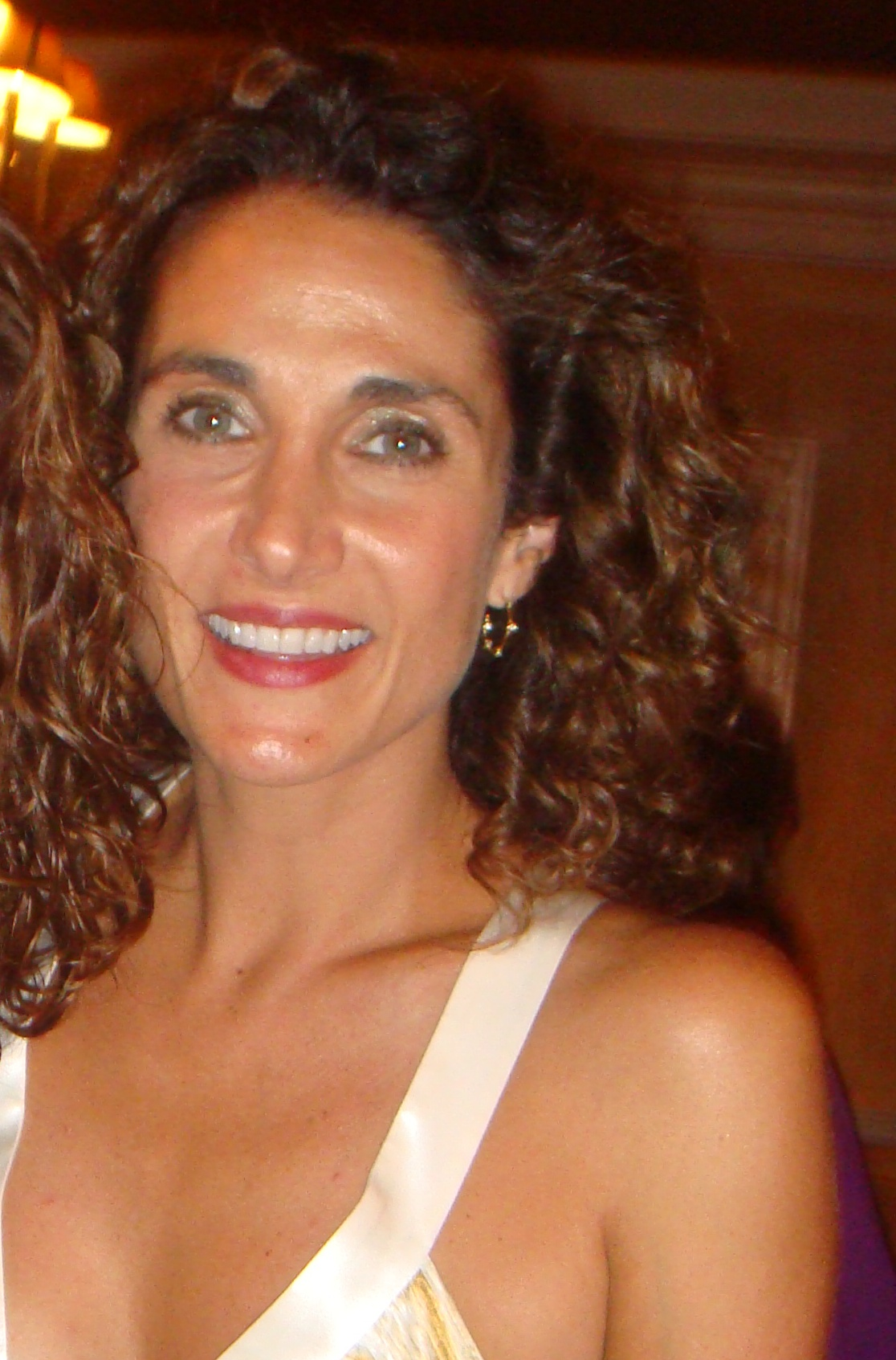
- Kanakaredes in Ohio, 2009
- Born: April 23, 1967 (age 59); Akron, Ohio, U.S.
- Education: Point Park College (B.A., Theatre, 1989)
- Occupation: Actress
- Years active: 1991–present
- Spouse: Peter Constantinides (m. 1992)
- Children: 2

Melina Eleni Kanakaredes-Constantinides (Greek: Μελίνα Ελένη Κανακαρίδη Κωνσταντινίδη; born April 23, 1967) is a Greek-American actress, widely known for her roles in American primetime television dramas as Dr. Sydney Hansen in Providence (1999–2002), Detective Stella Bonasera in CSI: NY Seasons 1-6 (2004–2010) and the evil Dr. Lane Hunter in the first two seasons of The Resident. She also starred on the American soap opera Guiding Light as the first Eleni Andros (1991–1995).

== Early life ==
Kanakaredes was born in Akron, Ohio, the youngest of three daughters of Connie (née Temo), a candy company owner, and Harry Kanakaredes, an insurance salesman. She is a second-generation Greek-American and speaks Greek fluently. Her two maternal uncles owned and ran a candy store in Akron called Temo's Candy Company, a chocolate store established by Kanakaredes' grandfather, Christ Temo, until its closure in 2020.

At age eight, Kanakaredes made her stage debut in a production of Tom Sawyer at Weathervane Playhouse in Akron, Ohio. She graduated from the Firestone High School in Akron. She attended The Ohio State University for a short time, and then transferred to Point Park College in Pittsburgh, Pennsylvania. There she also performed roles in the professional theatre scene, including that of Mary Magdalene in Jesus Christ Superstar at Pittsburgh Musical Theater. She graduated from Point Park in 1989 with a Bachelor of Arts degree in theater arts.

== Career ==
=== Television ===
Kanakaredes' first television role was on the daytime drama Guiding Light, originating the role of Eleni Andros from 1991 to 1995. She was nominated twice for a Daytime Emmy Award for her portrayal of Eleni. At the 21st Daytime Emmy Awards in 1994, she was nominated for Outstanding Younger Actress in a Drama Series and at the 22nd Daytime Emmy Awards the following year, she was nominated for Outstanding Supporting Actress in a Drama Series.

Kanakaredes' most high-profile roles on television were as the series protagonist Dr. Sydney Hansen on Providence, which ran for five seasons between 1999 and 2002, and as Det. Stella Bonasera on the CBS drama series CSI: NY. Kanakaredes left CSI: NY in 2010, after six seasons on the program.

Other television credits include NYPD Blue (in a recurring role as reporter Benita Alden during that show's second season), Due South, Oz, The Practice, Mad TV, a Hallmark Hall of Fame adaptation of the Anne Tyler novel Saint Maybe, and Dr. Lane Hunter on the Amy Holden Jones TV series The Resident. She also voice acted in episodes two and four of the first season of the animated Netflix series Blood of Zeus.

=== Film ===
Kanakaredes' film appearances include The Long Kiss Goodnight as Trin and 15 Minutes as Nicolette Karas, the girlfriend of Robert De Niro's character Eddie Flemming. She was considered for the lead role of Toula Portokalos in My Big Fat Greek Wedding, but had to turn it down due to her first pregnancy. She played the role of the Greek goddess Athena in Percy Jackson & the Olympians: The Lightning Thief and starred in the 2013 drama Snitch alongside Dwayne "The Rock" Johnson.

=== Stage ===
Subsequent to and while earning her BFA, Kanakaredes worked in theater, and her stage work includes: Sally Bowles in the 1998 revival of Cabaret and My Child: Mothers of War (2015).

== Personal life ==
Kanakaredes married Peter Constantinides (born March 29th, 1966), a chef, realtor and former restaurant consultant in a Greek Orthodox ceremony on September 6, 1992. They have two daughters: Zoe (born May 23, 2000) and Karina Eleni (born January 25, 2003). Neither of her pregnancies were written in during Providence seasons 2 and 5. Both she and her husband once owned the Tria Greek Kuzina in Powell, Ohio, but it has since closed.

== Filmography ==
=== Film ===
Year	Title	Role	Notes
1987	Carts		Short film
1994	Bleeding Hearts	Daphne	
1996	The Long Kiss Goodnight	Trina 'Trin'	
1998	Dangerous Beauty	Livia	
1998	Rounders	Barbara	
2001	15 Minutes	Nicolette Karas	
2010	Percy Jackson & the Olympians: The Lightning Thief	Athena	
2013	Snitch	Sylvie Collins	

=== Television ===
Year	Title	Role	Notes
1991–1995	Guiding Light	Eleni Andros	Main cast
1995	Due South	Victoria Metcalf	3 episodes
1995	New York News	Angela Villanova	13 episodes
1995	NYPD Blue	Benita Alden	5 episodes
1997	Leaving L.A.	Libby Galante	6 episodes
1997	The Practice	Andrea Wexler	Episodes: "First Degree" & "Sex, Lies and Monkeys"
1998	Oz	A.D.A. Marilyn Crenshaw	Episode: "Great Men"
1998	Saint Maybe	Rita	Movie
1999–2002	Providence	Dr. Sydney Hansen	Lead role
2004	CSI: Miami	Detective Stella Bonasera	Episode: "MIA/NYC Nonstop"
2004–2010	CSI: NY	Detective Stella Bonasera	Lead role 140 Episodes
2005	Into the Fire	Catrina/Sabrina Hampton	Movie
2009	Head Case	Herself	Episode: "The Big Book" (The Series' Finale)
2015	Hawaii Five-0	Special Agent Kathy Millwood	Episode: "Nanahu"
2015	Extant	Dorothy Richter	5 episodes
2016	Notorious	Dana Hartman	3 episodes
2018–2019	The Resident	Dr. Lane Hunter	Main cast, Season 1 Recurring, Season 2 (15 episodes)
2020	Blood of Zeus	Ariana	Original Netflix anime series (2 episodes)
2023	Billions	Nancy Dunlop	Episodes: "The Owl", "Axe Global" and "Admirals Fund" (The Series' Finale)
2025	NCIS	Eleni Kostakis	Episode: "Baker's Man"

=== Video games ===
Year	Title	Role	Notes
2008	CSI: NY	Det. Stella Bonasera (voice)	Video game

== Awards and nominations ==
Year	Association	Category	Work	Result
1994	Daytime Emmys	Outstanding Younger Actress in a Drama Series	Guiding Light	Nominated
1995	Daytime Emmys	Outstanding Supporting Actress in a Drama Series	Guiding Light	Nominated
2000	TV Guide Awards	Favorite Actress in a Drama	Providence	Won

== See also ==
- List of Greek Americans
