= Lucy & Desi: Before the Laughter =

1991 TV film

- Written by: William Luce
- Teleplay by: William Luce; Cynthia A. Cherbak
- Directed by: Charles Jarrott
- Starring: Frances Fisher; Maurice Benard; Robin Pearson Rose; John Wheeler
- Music by: Lee Holdridge
- Country of origin: United States
- Original language: English

Production
- Producer: Trevor Williams
- Cinematography: Reed Smoot
- Editor: Tom Stevens
- Running time: 95 minutes
- Production company: Larry Thompson Entertainment

Original release
- Network: CBS
- Release: February 10, 1991

Lucy & Desi: Before the Laughter is a 1991 television movie from CBS about the lives of Lucille Ball and Desi Arnaz. The movie begins when the two actors met in the 1940s and ends with their divorce in 1960. The movie covers how their careers developed, their often rocky marriage, and how they came to develop the I Love Lucy show. It recreates a number of scenes from classic I Love Lucy episodes, including "Lucy Thinks Ricky Is Trying to Murder Her" and "Lucy Does a TV Commercial". The television movie was directed by Charles Jarrott and written by William Luce, based on a teleplay by Luce and Cynthia A. Cherbak.

== Premise ==
The film begins in 1951, during the filming of the first episode of I Love Lucy. It then flashes back to a decade prior when Lucille Ball and Desi Arnaz first meet in show business and fall in love. The couple's ups and downs and their journey to creating the iconic TV show is shown.

== Cast ==
- Frances Fisher as Lucille Ball
- Maurice Benard as Desi Arnaz
- Robin Pearson Rose as Vivian Vance
- John Wheeler as William Frawley
- Edith Díaz as Dolores Arnaz
- Liane Langland as Maureen O'Hara
- Matthew Faison as Harry
- Bette Ford as DeDe Ball
- Patrick Cronin as Doc Bender
- Jim Brochu as Max
- Joyce Blair as Roxana
- Rance Howard as Berni
- Larry Anderson as Percy
- Howard Schechter as Jess Oppenheimer
- Doug Franklin as Marc Daniels
- Alan Oppenheimer as Arthur Lyons
- Roger Rose as cousin Larry
- Don Keefer as Grandpa Ball

== Production ==
After Desi Arnaz's death in 1986, Lucie Arnaz and the family's manager Raymond Katz made a deal with CBS to produce a made-for-television film called "The Desi Arnaz Story", but the script was turned down by the network, despite rewrites by Larry Luckinbill, Lucie Arnaz's husband. CBS preferred a film centered around both Arnaz and Ball, and Luckinbill teamed with producer Larry Thompson to re-pitch a script about the couple to the network. Lucie backed out of the project when she learned she would not have script approval. Luckinbill and Thompson parted ways, with Thompson forging ahead with the project and getting the greenlight from the network.

In 1990, a highly publicized nationwide casting search was held for actors to play Ball and Arnaz. Ultimately, Frances Fisher won the role of Ball. To prepare for the role, Fisher studied episodes of I Love Lucy and choreographed her scenes.

== Reception ==
Reviews expressed disappointment that the film lacks the humor and charm of the I Love Lucy TV show. Ken Tucker of Entertainment Weekly said "reducing a TV legend to the banal story of a troubled marriage ("You don’t love me — you don’t respect me!" sobs Fisher) is a woeful mistake". He did compliment Fisher, saying "her face will remind you of Ball's angularity, and she does a good job of imitating Ball's pop-eyed double takes and breathless screeching". Scott D. Pierce of the Deseret News was similarly positive about Fisher, commenting that what "makes her portrayal of Lucy believable is her ability to act, not simply do an imitation". John J. O'Connor of The New York Times criticized the script.

Lucie Arnaz publicly criticized the film, saying it was an inaccurate portrayal of her parents' marriage and was an attempt by the network to capitalize on their legacy so soon after their deaths.
