= Jennifer Heemstra (pianist) =

American pianist

Jennifer Heemstra (born about 1977) is an American concert pianist and cultural music organizer. Independent international press coverage has acclaimed her performances and her role in organizing community-oriented classical music initiatives in India and Brazil.

== Early life and education ==
Jennifer Heemstra was born in Grand Rapids, Michigan. She achieved her undergraduate degree, Bachelor of Music in Music Performance, with honors, at Michigan State University in 2000. Her 2005 Master of Music is from the Cleveland Institute of Music.

== Career ==
Beginning in 2015, The Telegraph in Kolkata published multiple reviews of Heemstra's performances. In one review, the paper described the Kolkata Classics Club as her "brainchild" and discussed her role in organizing and performing in the series. Reviews in the same newspaper covered her performances in recital and ensemble settings and discussed her playing as part of its arts coverage.

A 2022 profile in Correio Braziliense discussed Heemstra's performances and neighborhood concert activity in Brasília. In the United States, Federal News Network reported she received a Secretary of State Award for Outstanding Volunteerism Abroad in connection with music-related outreach work.

== Awards ==
- 2016–2017 Michigan State University College of Music Distinguished Alumni Award
- 2016 Secretary of State Award for Outstanding Volunteerism Abroad
