= Dirk van Hogendorp (lawyer) =

Dutch lawyer (1797–1845)

Dirk, Count van Hogendorp (18 December 1797, Amsterdam – 18 March 1845, The Hague), son of Gijsbert Karel van Hogendorp, nephew of Dirk van Hogendorp, father of Dirk van Hogendorp jr., was a Dutch jurist. Van Hogendorp lived continually in the shadow of his father, the founder of the first Dutch Constitution. He is a great-great-grandfather of Audrey Hepburn.

== Life ==
Van Hogendorp studied law at Leiden. He graduated there in 1822 as doctor 'in both laws' (Doctor iuris utriusque), that is, civil law and criminal law. During his studies, he came under the influence of Willem Bilderdijk. In 1830 Van Hogendorp became substitute-officer at the court of Amsterdam. Later on he became an attorney (raadsheer) in the Provincial Court of South Holland. In that same year, he married his first cousin Marianne Cathérine jonkvrouw van Hogendorp. They had a number of children, including Dirk van Hogendorp jr. (1833-1857), who like his father studied at Leiden and became a lawyer, and Anna van Hogendorp (1841-1915), who became a Christian supporter of women's suffrage. Through his oldest daughter Caroline (1831-1913), he is a great-great-grandfather of Audrey Hepburn.

In the summer of 1823 Dirk van Hogendorp travelled round the Netherlands on foot with his friend Jacob van Lennep. Both gentlemen loved this journey and produced diaries of it - that of Van Lennep was later published under the title 'Nederland in den goeden ouden Tijd' ('The Netherlands in the good old days', 1943) and 'Lopen met Van Lennep' ('Walking with Van Lennep', 2000), edited by Marita Mathijsen and Geert Mak. The last edition appeared as a result of a TV series made for the RVU by Theo Uittenbogaard, 'De Zomer van 1823' ('The Summer of 1823'), in which he and Geert Mak retraced the pair's footsteps.

The archives of Van Hogendorp are named in the 1955 Kluit Catalogus of the library of the University of Amsterdam on The Réveil.
