= Vledder =

- Village
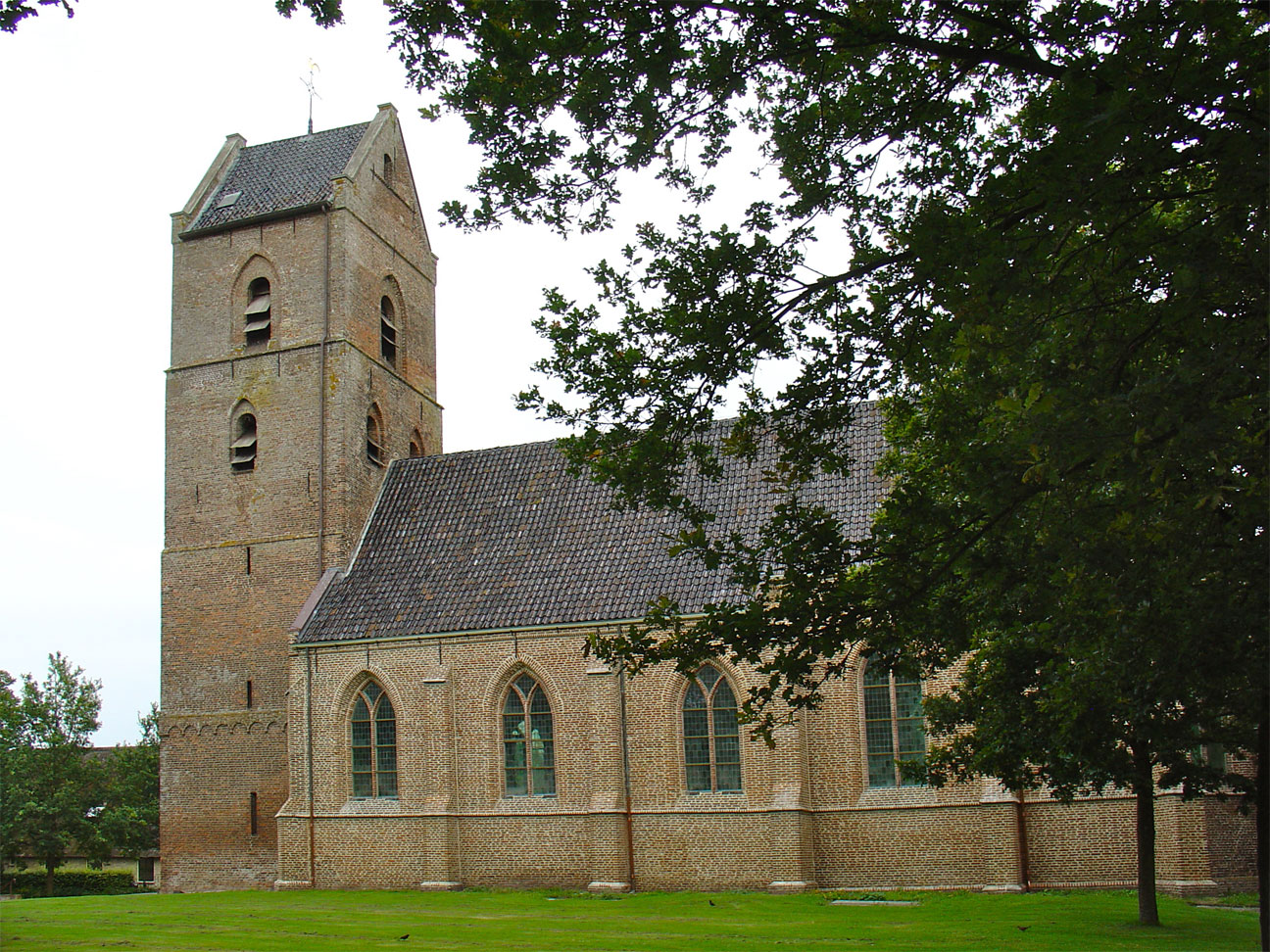
- Johannes de Doperkerk

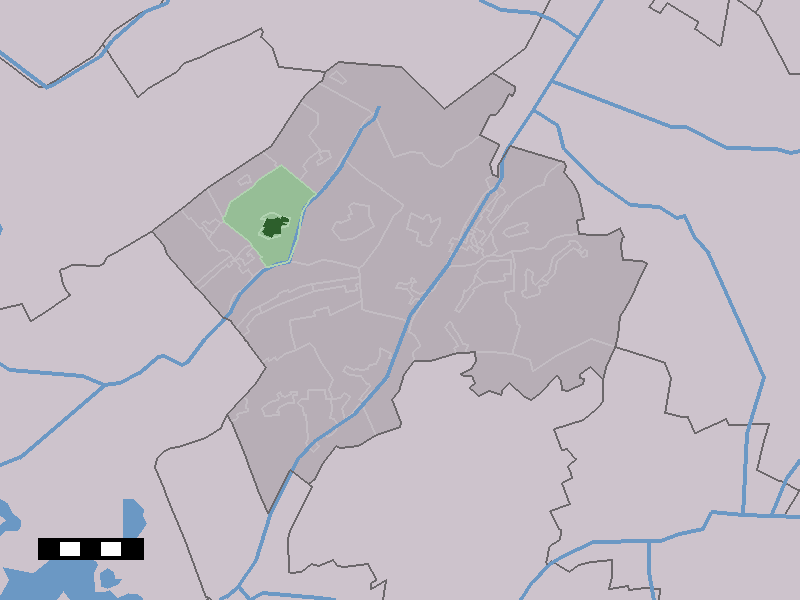
- The village centre (dark green) and the statistical district (light green) of Vledder in the municipality of Westerveld.

- Location in the Netherlands Vledder (Netherlands)
- Coordinates: 52°51′20″N 6°12′37″E
- Country: Netherlands
- Province: Drenthe
- Municipality: Westerveld

Area
  - Total: 12.68 km^{2} (4.90 sq mi)
- Elevation: 6 m (20 ft)

Population (2021)
  - Total: 1,960
  - Density: 155/km^{2} (400/sq mi)
- Time zone: UTC+1 (CET)
  - Summer (DST): UTC+2 (CEST)
- Postal code: 8381
- Dialing code: 0521

Vledder (Dutch pronunciation: [ˈvlɛdər]) is a village in the Dutch province of Drenthe. It is a part of the municipality of Westerveld, and lies about 24 km northwest of Hoogeveen. It is located along the small river Vledder Aa.

== History ==
Prehistoric settlements have been found in the area. Officially, the village of Vledder was started approximately in the year 500 AD. Situated in a desolate region, the village grew slowly. Around 900 AD seven farms were part of the community. In 1300 this number had risen to 20, at the end of the sixteenth century the farms numbered 29.

Vledder was a separate municipality between 1819 and 1998, when it became a part of Westerveld.

== Attractions ==
The village contains a museum of fake art, a Seamuseum, a Nazi labour camp for Jewish people (Kamp Vledder) and a museum of contemporary prints and glass.

== Gallery ==
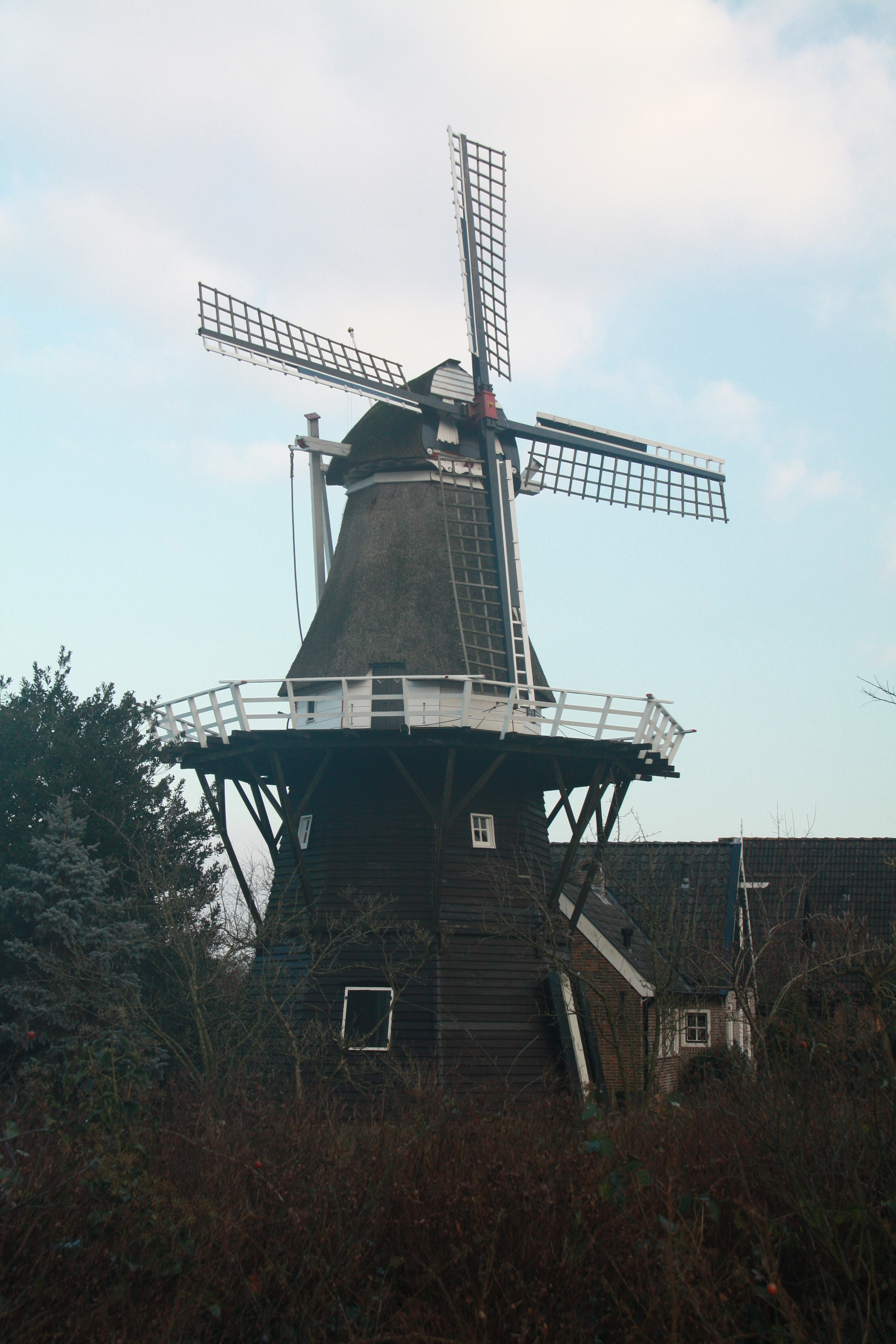
Molen van Vledder (The windmill)

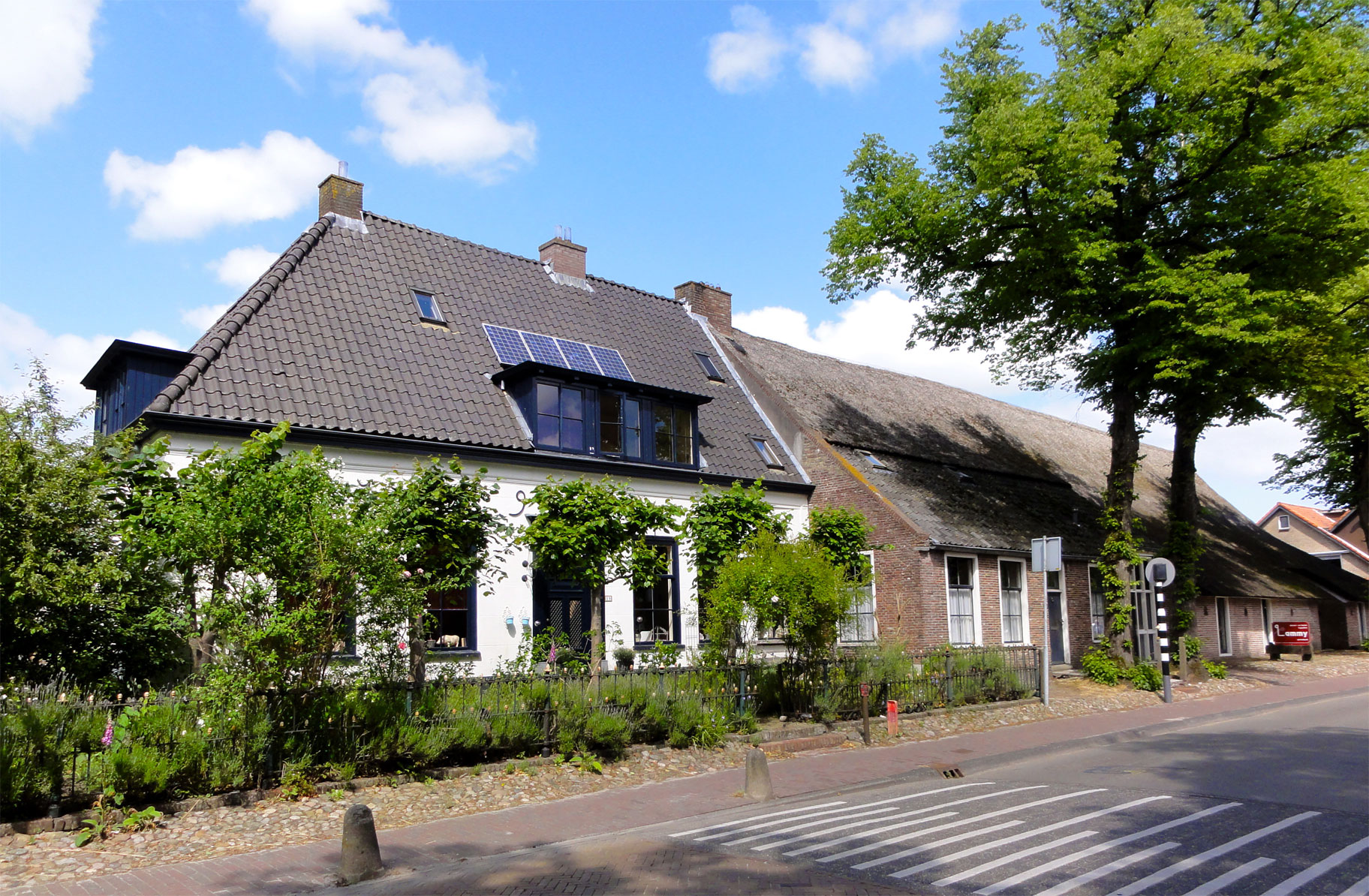
Houses in Vledder

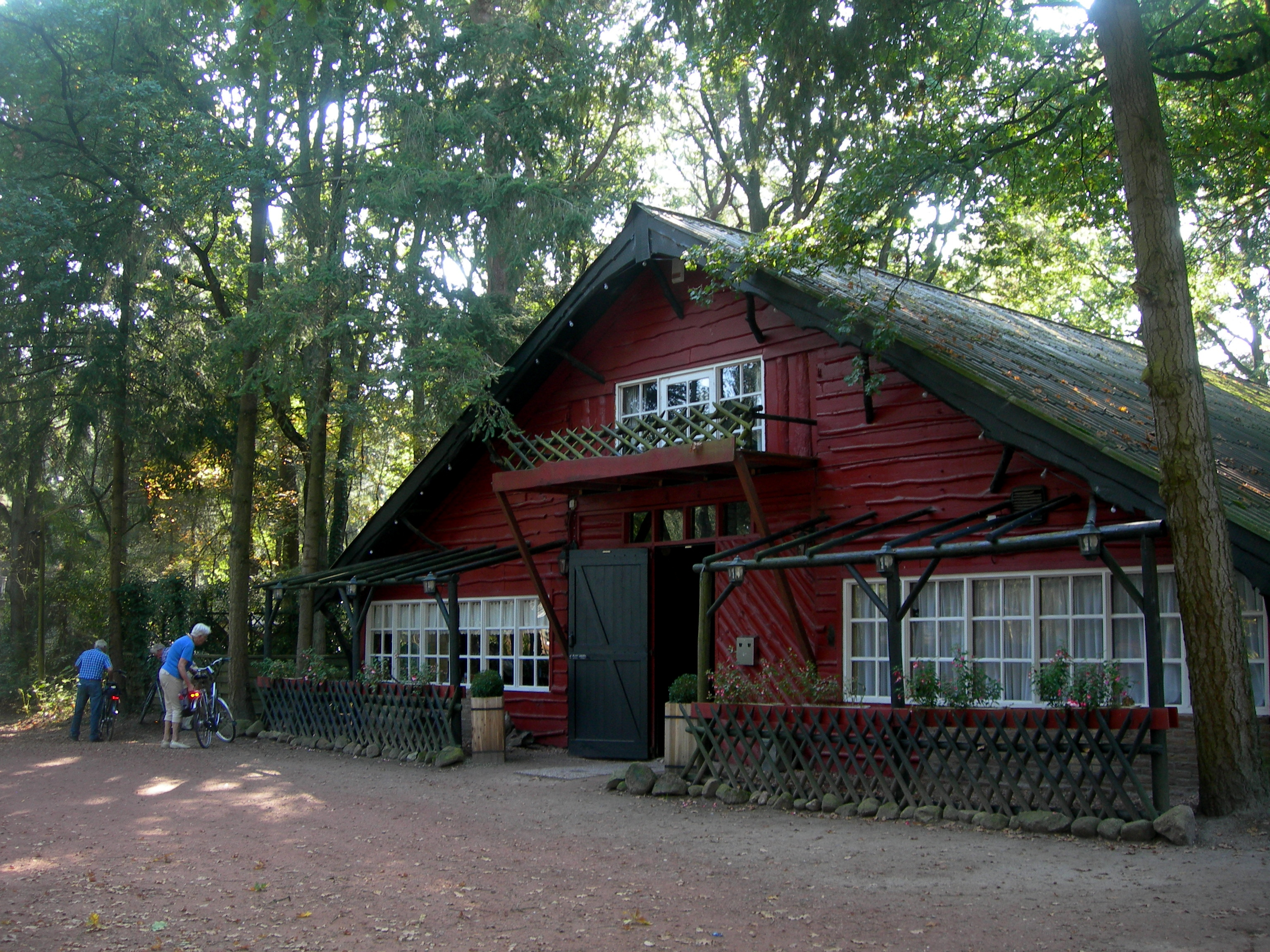
Bar restaurant

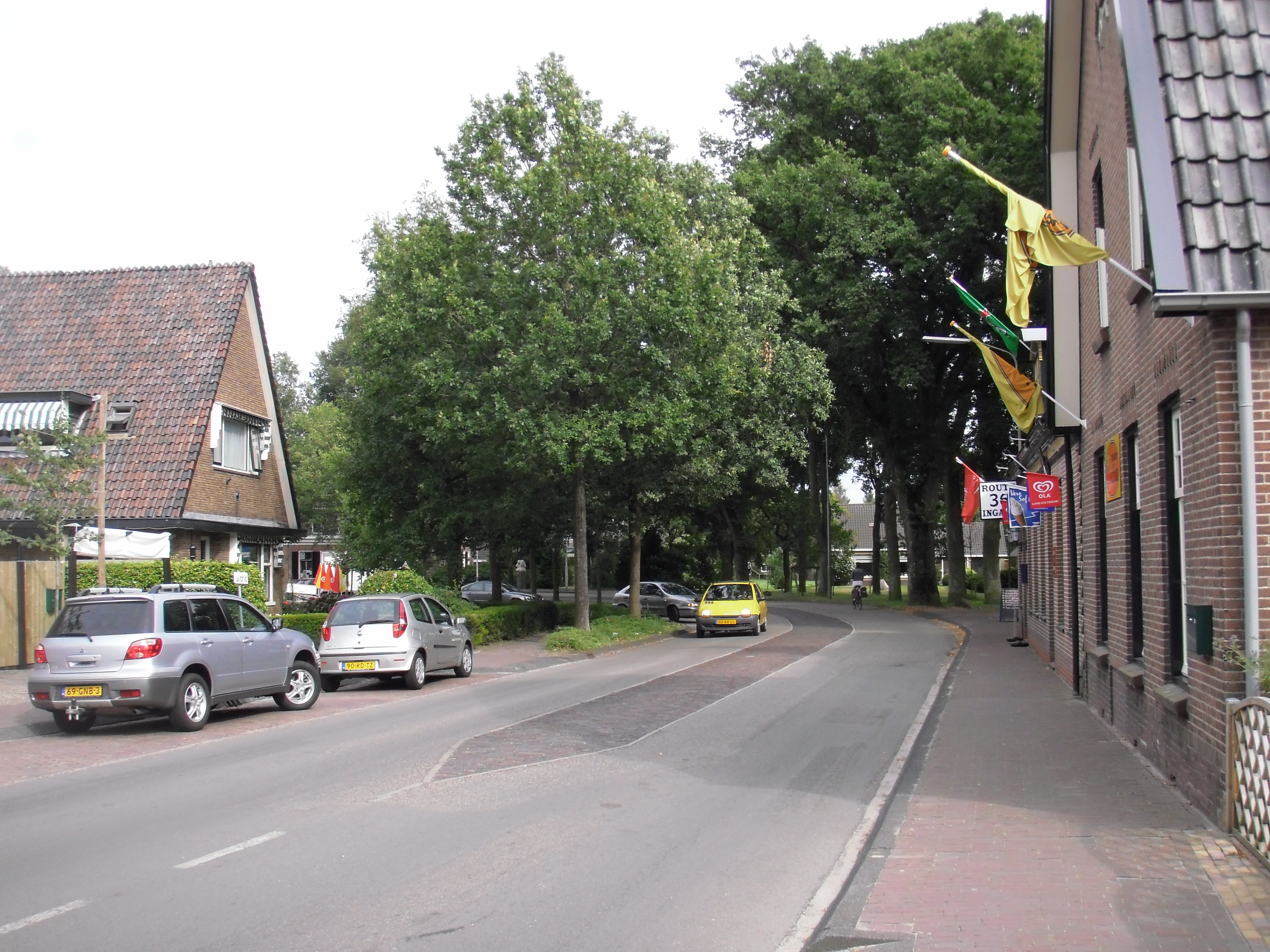
Village centre
