= Ella van Heemstra =

Dutch noblewoman and mother of Audrey Hepburn (1900–1984)

- Baroness van Heemstra
- Ella van Heemstra in 1951
- Born: 12 June 1900; Velp, Gelderland, Netherlands
- Died: 26 August 1984 (aged 84); Tolochenaz, Vaud, Switzerland
- Buried: Belgium
- Spouses: Jonkheer Hendrik Gustaaf Adolf Quarles van Ufford (m. 1919; div. 1925); Joseph Victor Anthony Ruston (m. 1926; div. 1939)
- Issue: Ian Quarles van Ufford; Alexander Quarles van Ufford; Audrey Hepburn
- Father: Baron Aarnoud van Heemstra
- Mother: Baroness Elbrig Willemine Henriette van Asbeck
- Occupation: Socialite and volunteer worker

Baroness Ella van Heemstra, DStJ (12 June 1900 – 26 August 1984) was a Dutch aristocrat and the mother of actress Audrey Hepburn.

== Biography ==
Ella van Heemstra was a Dutch aristocrat and the third of five daughters of Baron Aarnoud van Heemstra, who was mayor of Arnhem from 1910 to 1920 and served as Governor of Suriname between 1921 and 1928. Ella's mother was Elbrig Willemine Henriette, Baroness van Asbeck (1873–1939), who was a granddaughter of jurist Count Dirk van Hogendorp. She spent much of her childhood at Huis Doorn. German Emperor Kaiser Wilhelm purchased Huis Doorn, and moved in on 15 May 1920. This was to be his home until his death in June 1941. Van Heemstra had Dutch and small amounts of English ancestry.

== Personal life ==
Van Heemstra was married and divorced twice, and had three children.

Aged 19, Van Heemstra married Jonkheer Hendrik Gustaaf Adolf Quarles van Ufford. They divorced in 1925. Van Heemstra had two sons from this marriage, both of whom were born in the Dutch East Indies:

- Jonkheer Arnoud Robert Alexander Quarles van Ufford (1920–1979), married to Maria Margaretha Monné (1919–2006), with issue:
1. Michael Allan Quarles van Ufford (born 17 July 1945)
2. Evelyn Joyce Quarles van Ufford (born 2 August 1947)
- Jonkheer Ian Edgar Bruce Quarles van Ufford (1924–2010), married to Yvonne Scholtens (1928–2000), with issue:
1. Audrey Yvonne Quarles van Ufford (born 10 May 1954)
2. Sandra Claire Quarles van Ufford (born 15 October 1958)
3. Andrew Ian Quarles van Ufford (born 6 January 1967)

Van Heemstra married secondly Joseph Victor Anthony Ruston (later Hepburn-Ruston) on 24 September 1926 at Batavia, Java, Dutch East Indies. They were divorced on 24 June 1939 and had one daughter:

- Audrey Kathleen Ruston (4 May 1929 – 20 January 1993), commonly known as Audrey Hepburn

Van Heemstra was an early supporter of Adolf Hitler and his Nazi regime, penning several articles in praise of the fascist leader. Micky Burn was her lover; they corresponded while he was a prisoner at Colditz Castle, Oflag IV-C, after both left fascism, and after his release.

== Later life ==
In the early 1960s she lived in Los Angeles with her friend Leonard Gershe, and then later in San Francisco, where she did volunteer work for soldiers coming back from the Vietnam War.

When she visited Los Angeles she was entertained by friends like George Cukor, Mrs. Mildred Knopf (wife of Edwin H. Knopf) and Veronique Peck. She spent the rest of her life in her daughter's house in Tolochenaz, Switzerland where she died in 1984. Audrey accompanied her mother's body to the Netherlands for funeral.

=== Filmography ===
Year	Title	Role	Notes
1957	Funny Face	Sidewalk Cafe Patron	uncredited

== Honours ==
Ella was named Dame of the Most Venerable Order of the Hospital of Saint John of Jerusalem by Queen Elizabeth II on 7 September 1971.

== Ancestry ==
Ancestors of Ella van Heemstra

8. Frans Julius Johan van Heemstra, Baron van Heemstra
4. Willem Hendrik Johan, Baron van Heemstra
9. Henriëtta Philippina Jacoba, Baroness van Pallandt
2. Aarnoud van Heemstra, Baron van Heemstra
10. Jonkheer Arnoud Jan de Beaufort (1799-1866)
5. Wilhelmina Cornelia de Beaufort
11. Anna Aleida Stoop
1. Ella van Heemstra, Baroness van Heemstra
12. Tjalling Minne Watze van Asbeck, tot Bergen en Munsterhausen
6. Gerrit Ferdinand, Baron van Asbeck
13. Elbrig Bienema
3. Elbrig Willemine Henriette, Baroness van Asbeck
14. Count Dirk van Hogendorp (1797–1845)
7. Jonkvrouw Caroline van Hogendorp
15. Marianne Cathérine van Hogendorp
