= To Love and Die =

- Created by: Sara Goodman
- Starring: Shiri Appleby; Frances Fisher; Tim Matheson; Kristin Datillo; Seymour Cassel; Christine Adams; Ivan Sergei
- Country of origin: United States

Production
- Executive producers: JoAnn Alfano; Sara Goodman; David Kanter; Carla Kanter; Lorne Michaels; Andrew Singer
- Camera setup: Multi-Camera Setup
- Running time: approx. 42 minutes

Original release
- Network: USA Network
- Release: December 30, 2008

To Love and Die is the title of an American television action comedy-drama starring Shiri Appleby and Tim Matheson, and created by Sara Goodman. The show was greenlit to series on the USA Network in July 2007, with a 12-episode order that was planned to air in 2008. The 2-hour pilot finally premiered on December 30, 2008, as a television movie, receiving little promotion. The series was believed to have been dropped by the channel.

The pilot was directed by Mark Piznarski.

== Characters ==
=== Main characters ===
- Hildy Young (Shiri Appleby) — Young woman with intimacy issues who, after finding her father, ends up working for him as a contract killer.
- James White (Tim Matheson) — Hildy's contract killer father.
- Janet (Frances Fisher) — Hildy's intrusive and overbearing mother who constantly inserts herself into her daughter's messy love life.
- Nancy (Kristin Datillo) — Hildy's well mannered sister that has played it safe in life, opting for a quiet suburban home, two kids and a nice, boring husband.
- Eddie (Christine Adams) — A key member of White's contracting organization
- Blue (Ivan Sergei) — James's protégé who meets his match when he meets his boss's daughter
- Grandfather (Seymour Cassel) — James's former mentor, who handed the reins to James but often complains about his way of doing things and remembers how it used to be in the old days.

== Main crew ==
To Love and Die is produced by NBC Universal Television Studios and Broadway Video. Lorne Michaels ("Saturday Night Live," "30 Rock"), Andrew Singer ("Sons & Daughters"), Sara Goodman , and David Kanter ("Crime & Punishment") serve as executive producers.
