= Museum Meermanno =

Book museum in The Hague, Netherlands

House of the Book (formerly Museum Meermanno-Westreenianum)
- Huis van het boek
- Former name: Dutch: Museum Meermanno-Westreenianum
- Location: The Hague
- Coordinates: 52.0850°N 4.3157°E
- Visitors: 19,773 (2023)
- Director: Yoeri Meessen
- Website: www.huisvanhetboek.nl/en/

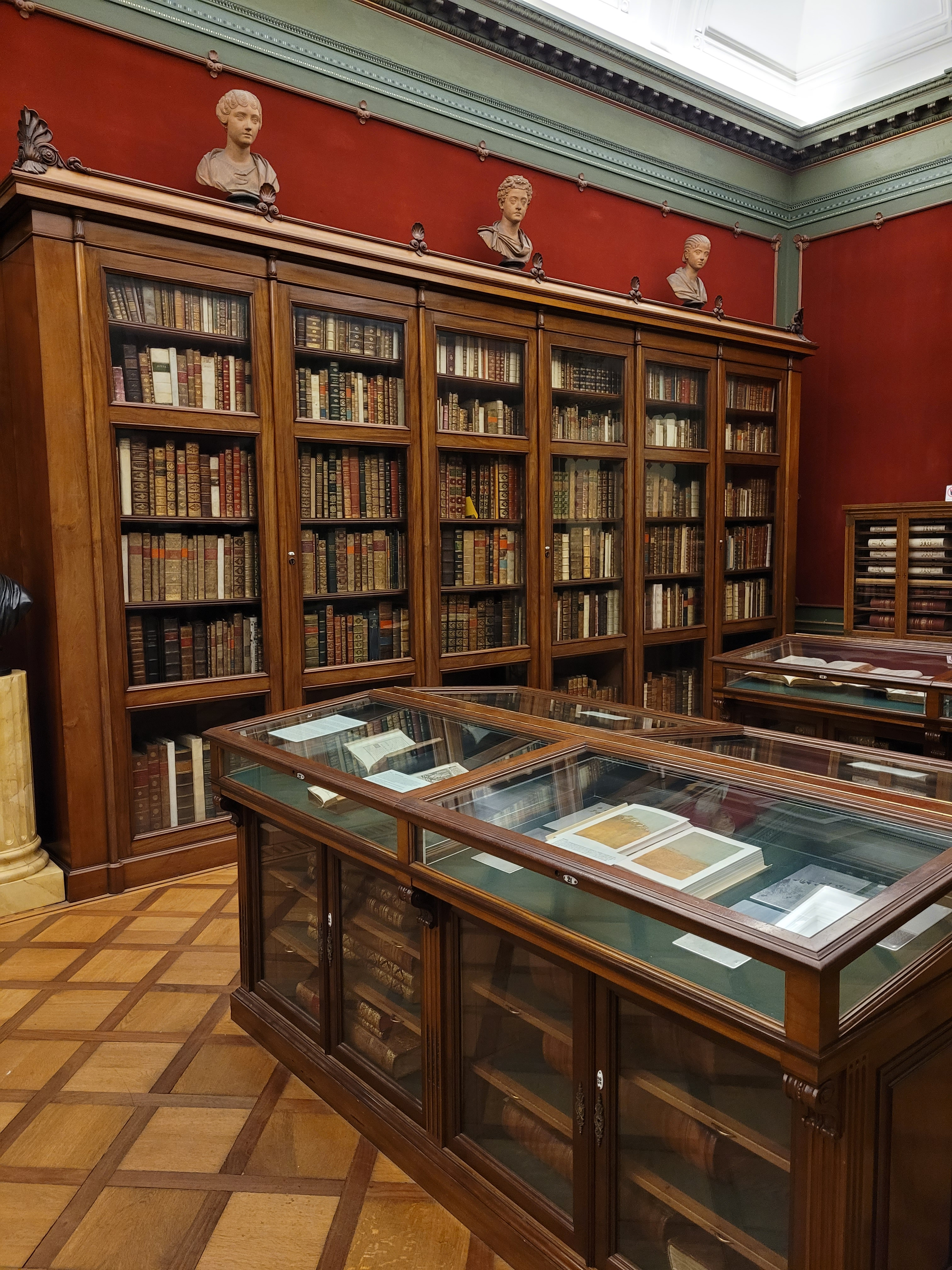
Huis van het boek (Meermanno Museum) on the Prinsessegracht 30 in The Hague.

The House of the Book (Dutch: Huis van het boek), formerly called Museum Meermanno and Museum Meermanno-Westreenianum, is a book museum in The Hague, Netherlands. It is the oldest book museum in the world, and houses a collection of books but also sculpture, etchings and paintings. Books from many different periods are collected, but it's particularly strong in medieval manuscripts. The museum is based in an 18th- century townhouse (Dutch: Herenhuis) that maintains many of its period furnishings and collectibles.

== History ==
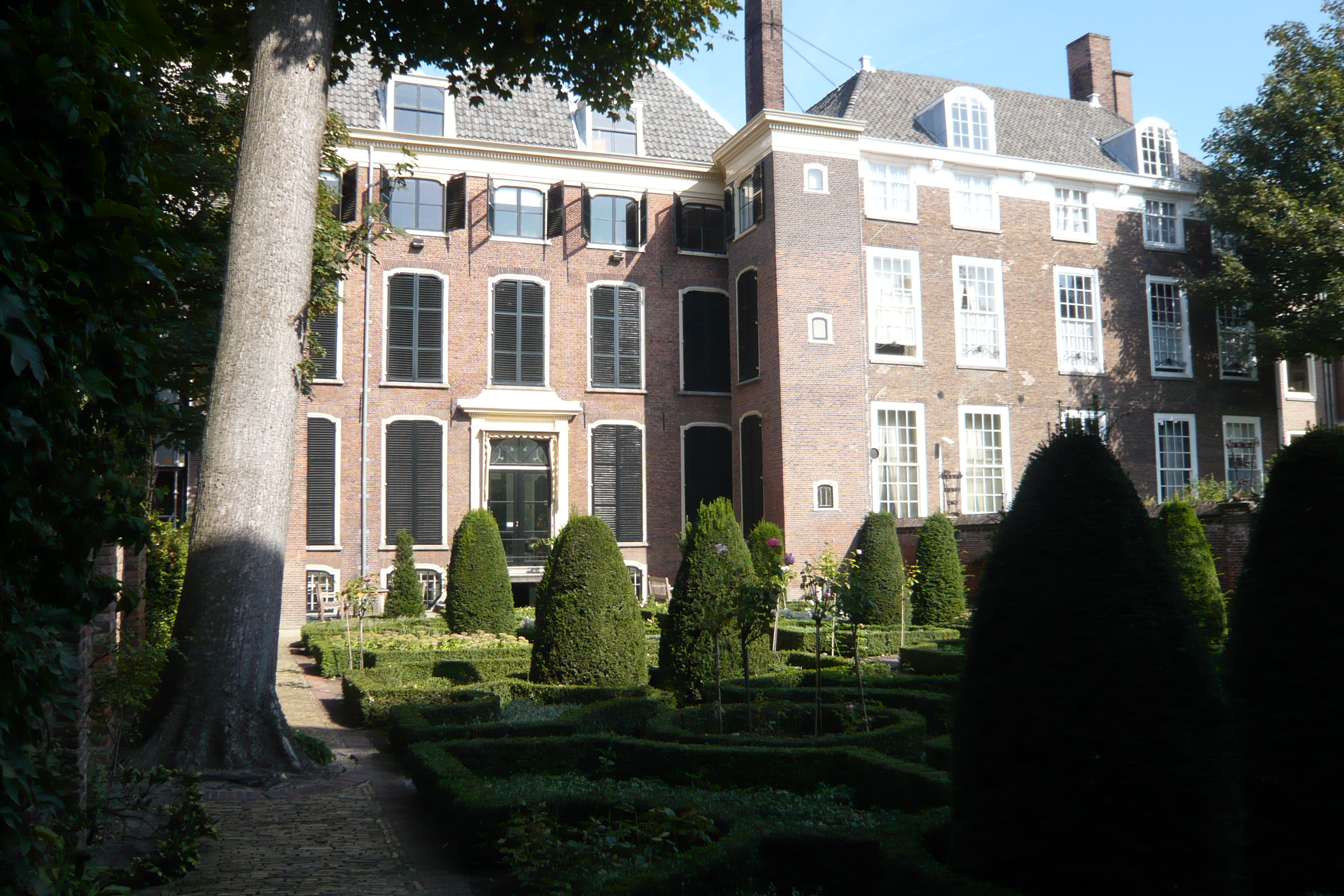
Rear of the museum with period garden.

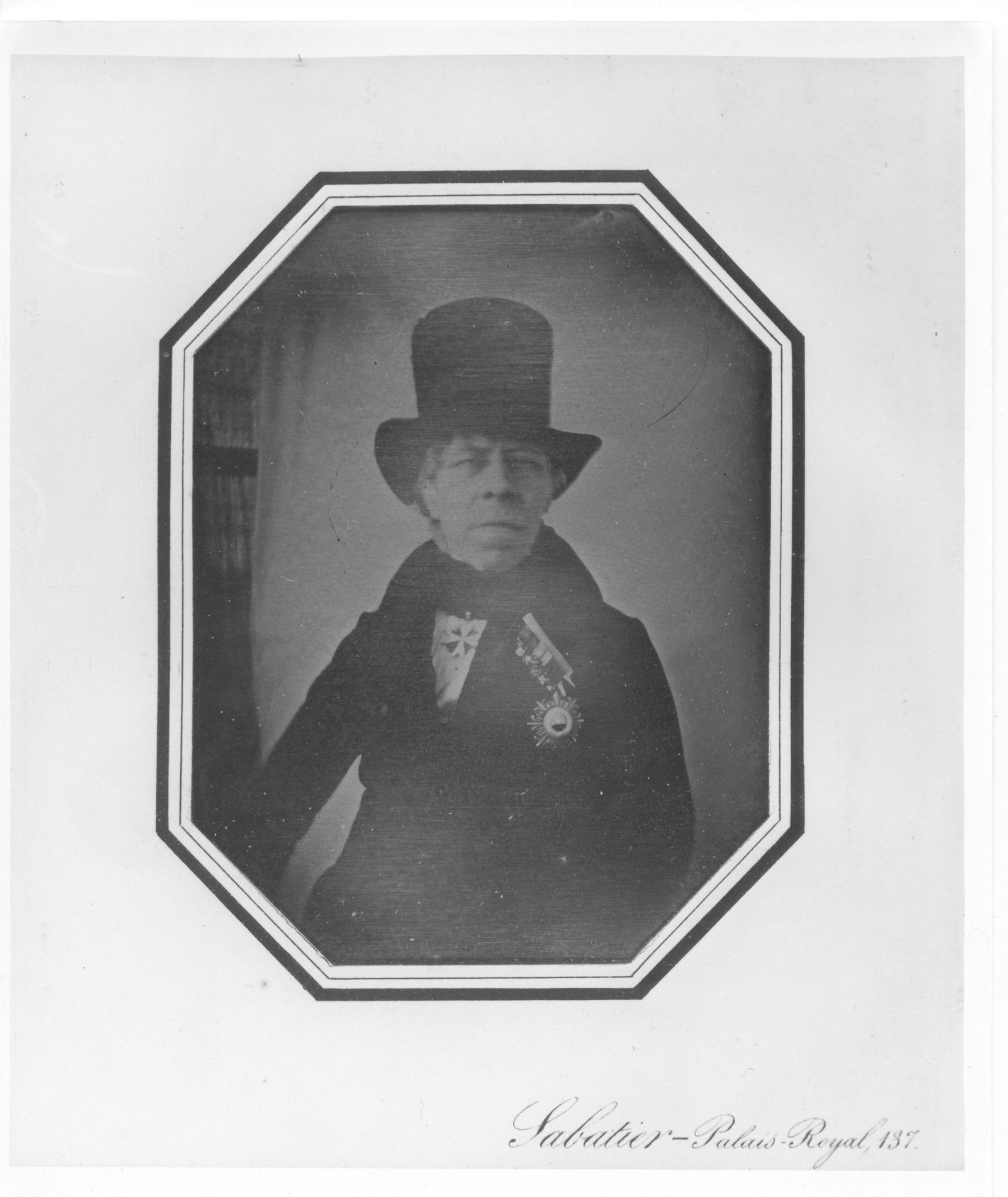
Willem Hendrik Jacob (Willem) baron van Westreenen van Tiellandt founder of Museum Meermanno

The museum is located in the former house of the book collector Willem Hendrik Jacob (Willem) baron van Westreenen van Tiellandt (1783–1848), who himself was a great admirer of his cousin Johan Meerman (1751–1815), a book collector, traveller, and diarist. The museum is partly a personal memorial to Meerman, and focuses today on written and printed books in all forms. The development of the design of old and modern books is the central theme.

The museum has a collection of books from all periods of Western history. Medieval manuscripts, their manufacture, restoration, and accompanying research are one of the most important features of the collection. The development of writing is shown through a bird's eye view of the layout and decoration of these manuscripts. Besides the medieval manuscripts, there are also fine incunabula, i.e. books printed before 1501.

In addition to the collection of old books, the museum also collects books printed from 1850 to the present day. The shape and design of the books are the central theme. Rotating exhibitions show various parts of the overall collection, while the interior of the house also contains paintings by famous Dutch masters. The museum owns the largest collection of bookplates in the Netherlands. There is also an old fashioned movable-type printing press in the museum.

== Governance ==
Yoeri Meessen has been the director of the House of the Book since March 2024. In 2023, it had a budget of €1.8m and 19,773 visitors.
