= Marita Mathijsen =

Dutch professor of literature (born 1944)

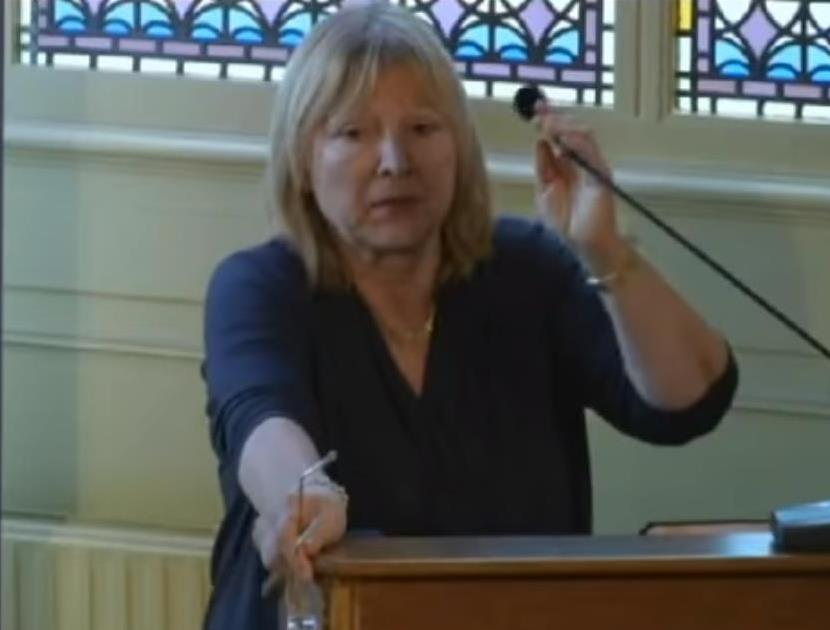
Marita Mathijsen {2013)

Marita Theodora Catharina Mathijsen-Verkooijen (born 8 August 1944 in Belfeld) is professor of modern Dutch literature at the University of Amsterdam, with her speciality as the literature of the nineteenth century in the Netherlands.

Mathijsen graduated with work on the correspondence between Jacob van Lennep and Gerrit van de Linde (also known as "De schoolmeester" - the schoolmaster). She is also editor in chief of the periodical De Negentiende Eeuw (The Nineteenth Century) and has many editions on the nineteenth-century Dutch classics. Apart from that she wrote various books on that period.
