= Pilot (CSI: Crime Scene Investigation) =

- CSI: Crime Scene Investigation episode
- Episode no.: Season 1 Episode 1
- Directed by: Danny Cannon
- Written by: Anthony E. Zuiker
- Production code: 100
- Original air date: October 6, 2000

Guest appearances
- Matt O'Toole as Paul Millander; Madison McReynolds as Lindsey Willows; Harrison Young as Judge Cohen; Chandra West as Holly Gribbs; Eric Szmanda as Greg Sanders; Garland Whitt as Jerrod Cooper; Krista Allen as Kristi Hopkins; John Pyper-Ferguson as Husband; Allan Rich as Dr. Gary Klausbach; Susan Gibney as Charlotte Meridian; Royce D. Applegate as Mr. Laferty; Barbara Tarbuck as Paige Harmon; Nancy Fish as Lesley Stahl; Cedric Terrell as Boe Wilson; Skip O'Brien as Srgt. Ray O'Riley; Aasif Mandvi as Dr. Leever; John Henry Whitaker as Jimmy; Greg Collins as Officer Arvington; Ashley Holloway as Laura Scott; Jeff Snyder as Officer Smith; Jane Leigh Connelly as Wife

Episode chronology
← Previous —	Next → "Cool Change"

"Pilot" is the pilot episode and the first episode of the first season of the American crime drama television series CSI: Crime Scene Investigation. Written by series creator Anthony E. Zuiker and directed by Danny Cannon, it first aired on October 6, 2000, on CBS in the United States. The premise of the show revolves around the crime scene investigators working for the Las Vegas Police Department, in what was known in this episode as the "criminalistics" division. The pilot introduces the main characters of Gil Grissom (William Petersen), Catherine Willows (Marg Helgenberger), Nick Stokes (George Eads), Warrick Brown (Gary Dourdan) and Jim Brass (Paul Guilfoyle); and then-recurring character Greg Sanders (Eric Szmanda). The pilot was written by series creator Anthony E. Zuiker and directed by Danny Cannon.

== Plot ==
Holly Gribbs introduces herself to Gil Grissom, who is the assistant supervisor of the graveyard shift. Grissom then asks her for a pint of blood and after that, Gribbs officially begins her shift.

Nick Stokes and Warrick Brown both realize that they only need to solve one more crime to reach the level of CSI 3. The two eventually agree on a bet of 20 dollars that one of them will be promoted to CSI Level 3 by the end of the night. Catherine Willows jumps out of a car, saying goodbye to her daughter and her sister before rushing into the CSI building. Night Shift supervisor Jim Brass hands the CSIs their assignments for the night.

Brass and Grissom investigate what appears to be the suicide of Royce Harmon. However, the autopsy shows that the entry hole for the bullet is too big for a shot at close range, as would be the case if he had shot himself in the chest, and they realize that Harmon was murdered.

Grissom finds a fingerprint with latex particles in it on the tape-recorder Harmon used to record his "suicide" note. The print belongs to Paul Millander, a man who sells fake Halloween hands made from a mold of his own hand. Grissom realizes that the suspect used one of these hands.

Nick Stokes arrives at his crime scene and meets a man who was drugged by a hooker and had his possessions stolen while he was unconscious. Nick notices a discoloration around the man's mouth that he thereafter ties up with another caseload, Kristy Hopkins, who accidentally crashes her car when she got knocked unconscious while driving. He notices the same discoloration around her nipples and realizes that she put scopolamine on her nipples to knock out her victims and steal their possessions.

Catherine and Warrick arrive at a house where a man lies dead. They have discovered that the dead man had been staying at the house until the owners recently kicked him out. When he tried to kick in the door, the husband shot him. Catherine notices that the husband's left toenail is broken and that the laces of the dead man's shoes are tied differently from each other. Warrick processes the shoes and finds a broken toenail in one of them. He tries to obtain a warrant for the husband's toenails but Brass refuses to call the judge, so Warrick visits Judge Cohen. In exchange for giving him a blank warrant, the judge gets Warrick to place a bet for him on a football game.

Grissom takes Holly to her first crime scene, a store robbery, and leaves her there. However, when the store owner pulls a gun on Holly, she requests backup from Catherine. Later, as Holly wonders if she is cut out for this job, Catherine convinces her to stay until she solves her first case and that if she doesn't feel like King Kong on cocaine after she's solved her case, then she can quit. But if Gribbs stays with it, then Catherine promises her that she's not going to regret it.

Brass discovers that Warrick went behind his back to obtain a warrant and pulls him from his case, leaving Warrick enraged and furious at the news. Brass forces Warrick to shadow Holly.

However, Warrick still has to place the bet for Judge Cohen and leaves Holly at the scene alone with a police officer. Unbeknownst to the CSI team, the officer leaves Holly's scene, leaving her to process the scene alone. The suspect returns to the scene and attacks her by pulling out a gun.

Meanwhile, Grissom takes over Warrick's case and finds the husband's toenail clippings. He matches the broken nail in the shoe to the husband's clippings and concludes that the husband shot the victim and then kicked the door in to make the murder look like self-defense.

Nick, having solved his 100th case, is now a Level 3 CSI much to his joy.

As the CSI team begins to celebrate with Catherine even offering to go get them breakfast, Brass tells them the news that Holly has been shot and is in the hospital with the revelation that she's not being expected to survive. He puts Warrick on admin leave, pending a full investigation into his whereabouts at the time Holly was shot before telling the team to get ready to pull a double.

== Continuity ==
- The Royce Harmon murder is the first of a series involving Paul Millander, who would appear again in "Anonymous" and "Identity Crisis".
- Charlotte tells Grissom that if he wants to be different he should pin her up against a wall. In Invisible Evidence, Grissom pins Sara against the wall.
- Catherine's "King Kong on cocaine" pep talk to Holly would be referred to twice: in her farewell chat to Morgan Brody in season 12 episode Willows in the Wind, and to her daughter Lindsey in a deleted scene in the finale Immortality, where she was a lab technician.

== Reception ==
In its original broadcast, "Pilot" finished 8th in the Nielsen ratings for the week of October 2–8, 2000, with an 11.8 rating and 21 share. Meaning that it was seen by 11.8 percent of all adults aged 18 to 49, and 21 percent of all 18- to 49-year-olds watching television at the time of the broadcast. With an estimated 17.3 million viewers tuning in, it was the third highest-rated show on CBS that week, following episodes of Everybody Loves Raymond and 60 Minutes. The episode was also the most watched new series of the week.

The episode won casting director April Webster the Artios Award for Best Casting for a Dramatic Pilot. It was nominated for the Golden Reel Award for Best Sound Editing in a Television Episode (Mace Matiosian, supervising sound editor; David Rawlinson, supervising sound editor; David F. Van Slyke, sound editor). "Pilot" received a Creative Arts Emmy Award nomination for Outstanding Single Camera Picture Editing for a Series (Alex Mackie, editor; Alec Smight, editor). The episode also earned a nomination for Best Edited One-Hour Series for Television from the American Cinema Editors.
