= Producers Guild of America Award for Best Episodic Drama =

- Awarded for: Outstanding Production of Episodic Television, Drama
- Country: United States
- Presented by: Producers Guild of America
- First award: 2000
- Currently held by: Shōgun (2024)

The Producers Guild of America Award for Best Episodic Drama, also known as the Norman Felton Award for Outstanding Producer of Episodic Television, Drama, is an annual award given by the Producers Guild of America since 2000.

== Previous PGA television awards ==
Prior to 2000, the award for outstanding producer of episodic television was not split into drama and comedy. Out of the eleven honored television programs, seven were episodic dramas:

1. 1991: Northern Exposure (CBS)
2. 1992: I'll Fly Away (NBC)
3. 1993: NYPD Blue (ABC)
4. 1994: ER (NBC)
5. 1996: Law & Order (NBC)
6. 1998: The Practice (ABC)
7. 1999: The Sopranos (HBO)

== Winners and nominees ==
=== 2000s ===
Year	Winners and nominees	Network	Season	Ref.
2000 (12th)	The West Wing	NBC	Seasons 1B and 2A	
2000 (12th)	ER	NBC	Seasons 6B and 7A	
2000 (12th)	Law & Order	NBC	Seasons 10B and 11A	
2000 (12th)	Oz	HBO	Season 4A	
2000 (12th)	The Practice	ABC	Seasons 4B and 5A	
2001 (13th)	The West Wing	NBC	Seasons 2B and 3A	
2001 (13th)	CSI: Crime Scene Investigation	CBS	Seasons 1B and 2A	
2001 (13th)	Law & Order	NBC	Seasons 11B and 12A	
2001 (13th)	Six Feet Under	HBO	Season 1	
2001 (13th)	The Sopranos	HBO	Season 3	
2002 (14th)	24	Fox	Seasons 1B and 2A	
2002 (14th)	CSI: Crime Scene Investigation	CBS	Seasons 2B and 3A	
2002 (14th)	Six Feet Under	HBO	Season 2	
2002 (14th)	The Sopranos	HBO	Season 4	
2002 (14th)	The West Wing	NBC	Seasons 3B and 4A	
2003 (15th)	Six Feet Under	HBO	Season 3	
2003 (15th)	24	Fox	Seasons 2B and 3A	
2003 (15th)	Alias	ABC	Seasons 2B and 3A	
2003 (15th)	CSI: Crime Scene Investigation	CBS	Seasons 3B and 4A	
2003 (15th)	The West Wing	NBC	Seasons 4B and 5A	
2004 (16th)	The Sopranos	HBO	Season 5	
2004 (16th)	CSI: Crime Scene Investigation	CBS	Season 4B	
2004 (16th)	Nip/Tuck	FX	Season 2	
2004 (16th)	Six Feet Under	HBO	Season 4	
2004 (16th)	The West Wing	NBC	Season 5B	
2005 (17th)	Lost	ABC	Season 1	
2005 (17th)	24	Fox	Season 4	
2005 (17th)	Boston Legal	ABC	Season 1	
2005 (17th)	Grey's Anatomy	ABC	Season 1	
2005 (17th)	Six Feet Under	HBO	Season 5	
2006 (18th)	Grey's Anatomy	ABC	Season 2	
2006 (18th)	24	Fox	Season 5	
2006 (18th)	House	Fox	Season 2	
2006 (18th)	Lost	ABC	Season 2	
2006 (18th)	The Sopranos	HBO	Season 6A	
2007 (19th)	The Sopranos	HBO	Season 6B	
2007 (19th)	Dexter	Showtime	Season 1	
2007 (19th)	Grey's Anatomy	ABC	Season 3	
2007 (19th)	Heroes	NBC	Season 1	
2007 (19th)	House	Fox	Season 3	
2007 (19th)	Lost	ABC	Season 3	
2008 (20th)	Mad Men	AMC	Season 1	
2008 (20th)	Boston Legal	ABC	Season 4	
2008 (20th)	Damages	FX	Season 1	
2008 (20th)	Dexter	Showtime	Season 2	
2008 (20th)	Lost	ABC	Season 4	
2009 (21st)	Mad Men	AMC	Season 2	
2009 (21st)	Breaking Bad	AMC	Season 2	
2009 (21st)	Dexter	Showtime	Season 3	
2009 (21st)	Lost	ABC	Season 5	
2009 (21st)	True Blood	HBO	Season 1	

=== 2010s ===
Year	Winners and nominees	Network	Season	Ref.
2010 (22nd)	Mad Men	AMC	Season 3	
2010 (22nd)	Breaking Bad	AMC	Season 3	
2010 (22nd)	Dexter	Showtime	Season 4	
2010 (22nd)	Lost	ABC	Season 6	
2010 (22nd)	True Blood	HBO	Season 2	
2011 (23rd)	Boardwalk Empire	HBO	Season 1	
2011 (23rd)	Dexter	Showtime	Season 5	
2011 (23rd)	Game of Thrones	HBO	Season 1	
2011 (23rd)	The Good Wife	CBS	Season 2	
2011 (23rd)	Mad Men	AMC	Season 4	
2012 (24th)	Homeland	Showtime	Season 1	
2012 (24th)	Breaking Bad	AMC	Season 4	
2012 (24th)	Downton Abbey	PBS	Season 2	
2012 (24th)	Game of Thrones	HBO	Season 2	
2012 (24th)	Mad Men	AMC	Season 5	
2013 (25th)	Breaking Bad	AMC	Season 5A	
2013 (25th)	Downton Abbey	PBS	Season 3	
2013 (25th)	Game of Thrones	HBO	Season 3	
2013 (25th)	Homeland	Showtime	Season 2	
2013 (25th)	House of Cards	Netflix	Season 1	
2014 (26th)	Breaking Bad	AMC	Season 5B	
2014 (26th)	Downton Abbey	PBS	Season 4	
2014 (26th)	Game of Thrones	HBO	Season 4	
2014 (26th)	House of Cards	Netflix	Season 2	
2014 (26th)	True Detective	HBO	Season 1	
2015 (27th)	Game of Thrones	HBO	Season 5	
2015 (27th)	Better Call Saul	AMC	Season 1	
2015 (27th)	Homeland	Showtime	Season 4	
2015 (27th)	House of Cards	Netflix	Season 3	
2015 (27th)	Mad Men	AMC	Season 7B	
2016 (28th)	Stranger Things	Netflix	Season 1	
2016 (28th)	Better Call Saul	AMC	Season 2	
2016 (28th)	Game of Thrones	HBO	Season 6	
2016 (28th)	House of Cards	Netflix	Season 4	
2016 (28th)	Westworld	HBO	Season 1	
2017 (29th)	The Handmaid's Tale	Hulu	Season 1	
2017 (29th)	Big Little Lies	HBO	Season 1	
2017 (29th)	The Crown	Netflix	Season 2	
2017 (29th)	Game of Thrones	HBO	Season 7	
2017 (29th)	Stranger Things	Netflix	Season 2	
2018 (30th)	The Americans	FX	Season 6	
2018 (30th)	Better Call Saul	AMC	Season 4	
2018 (30th)	The Handmaid's Tale	Hulu	Season 2	
2018 (30th)	Ozark	Netflix	Season 2	
2018 (30th)	This Is Us	NBC	Seasons 2B and 3A	
2019 (31st)	Succession	HBO	Season 2	
2019 (31st)	Big Little Lies	HBO	Season 2	
2019 (31st)	The Crown	Netflix	Season 3	
2019 (31st)	Game of Thrones	HBO	Season 8	
2019 (31st)	Watchmen	HBO	Season 1	

=== 2020s ===
Year	Winners and nominees	Network	Season	Ref.
2020 (32nd)	The Crown	Netflix	Season 4	
2020 (32nd)	Better Call Saul	AMC	Season 5	
2020 (32nd)	Bridgerton	Netflix	Season 1	
2020 (32nd)	The Mandalorian	Disney+	Season 2	
2020 (32nd)	Ozark	Netflix	Season 3	
2021 (33rd)	Succession	HBO	Season 3	
2021 (33rd)	The Handmaid's Tale	Hulu	Season 4	
2021 (33rd)	The Morning Show	Apple TV+	Season 2	
2021 (33rd)	Squid Game	Netflix	Season 1	
2021 (33rd)	Yellowstone	Paramount Network	Season 4	
2022 (34th)	The White Lotus	HBO	Season 2	
2022 (34th)	Andor	Disney+	Season 1	
2022 (34th)	Better Call Saul	AMC	Season 6	
2022 (34th)	Ozark	Netflix	Season 4	
2022 (34th)	Severance	Apple TV+	Season 1	
2023 (35th)	Succession	HBO	Season 4	
2023 (35th)	The Crown	Netflix	Season 6	
2023 (35th)	The Diplomat	Netflix	Season 1	
2023 (35th)	The Last of Us	HBO	Season 1	
2023 (35th)	The Morning Show	Apple TV+	Season 3	
2024 (36th)	Shōgun	FX	Season 1	
2024 (36th)	Bad Sisters	Apple TV+	Season 2	
2024 (36th)	The Diplomat	Netflix	Season 2	
2024 (36th)	Fallout	Prime Video	Season 1	
2024 (36th)	Slow Horses	Apple TV+	Season 4	
2025 (37th)	The Pitt	HBO Max	Season 1	
2025 (37th)	Andor	Disney+	Season 2	
2025 (37th)	The Diplomat	Netflix	Season 3	
2025 (37th)	Pluribus	Apple TV	Season 1	
2025 (37th)	Severance	Apple TV	Season 2	
2025 (37th)	The White Lotus	HBO Max	Season 3	

== Total awards by network ==
- HBO – 9
- AMC – 5
- ABC – 2
- FX – 2
- NBC – 2
- Netflix – 2
- FOX – 1
- Hulu – 1
- Showtime – 1

== Total nominations by network ==
- HBO – 32
- Netflix – 17
- AMC – 16
- ABC – 13
- NBC – 10
- Showtime – 8
- FOX – 6
- Apple TV+ – 5
- CBS – 5
- FX – 4
- Hulu – 3
- PBS – 3
- Disney+ – 2
- Paramount Network – 1
- Prime Video – 1

== Eligibility Calendar Per Year ==
2nd. January 1990 to December 1990

3rd. January 1991 to December 1991

4th. January 1992 to December 1992

5th. January 1993 to December 1993

6th. January 1994 to December 1994

7th. January 1995 to December 1995

8th. January 1996 to December 1996

9th. January 1997 to December 1997

10th. January 1998 to December 1998

11th. January 1999 to December 1999

12th. January 2000 to December 2000

13th. January 2001 to December 2001

14th. January 2002 to December 2002

15th. January 2003 to December 2003

16th. January 2004 to August 2004

17th. September 2004 to August 2005

18th. September 2005 to May 2006

19th. June 2006 to May 2007

20th. June 2007 to May 2008

21st. June 2008 to May 2009

22nd. June 2009 to May 2010

23rd. June 2010 to May 2011

24th. June 2011 to May 2012

25th. June 2012 to May 2013

26th. June 2013 to May 2014

27th. June 2014 to May 2015

28th. June 2015 to December 2016

29th. January 2017 to December 2017

30th. January 2018 to December 2018

31st. January 2019 to December 2019

32nd. January 2020 to December 2020

33rd. January 2021 to December 2021

34th. January 2022 to December 2022

== Programs with multiple awards ==
3 awards

- Mad Men (consecutive)
- The Sopranos
- Succession

2 awards

- Breaking Bad (consecutive)
- The West Wing (consecutive)

== Programs with multiple nominations ==
8 nominations

- Game of Thrones

6 nominations

- Lost
- Mad Men
- The Sopranos

5 nominations

- Better Call Saul
- Breaking Bad
- Dexter
- Six Feet Under
- The West Wing

4 nominations

- 24
- The Crown
- CSI: Crime Scene Investigation
- House of Cards

3 nominations

- Downton Abbey
- Grey's Anatomy
- The Handmaid's Tale
- Homeland
- Ozark
- Succession

2 nominations

- Big Little Lies
- Boston Legal
- The Diplomat
- House
- Law & Order
- The Morning Show
- Stranger Things
- True Blood
