= Killings of Sydney Land and Nehemiah Kauffman =

2016 unsolved double murder

- Location: 36°6′32″N 115°18′50.6″W; 4550 South Hualapai Way, Las Vegas, Nevada
- Date: October 26, 2016
- Attack type: Homicide by shooting
- Weapon: Firearm
- Deaths: 2
- Victims: Sydney Land, Nehemiah Kauffman
- Coroner: Clark County Coroner's Office

On October 26, 2016, Sydney Land and her boyfriend Nehemiah Kauffman were shot and killed in her apartment in Las Vegas, Nevada. Their bodies were found the next day. Initially, Las Vegas Metropolitan Police Department (also known as Metro) announced that they had no motive and no suspects in the case. Land's mother, Connie Land, asserted that Sydney had possibly been targeted for prostitution grooming by pimps.

A local judge, Melanie Andress-Tobiasson, befriended Connie Land over shared concerns about sex trafficking in Las Vegas, but later the two friends had a falling out. Andress-Tobiasson had compelled Connie to hand over confidential text messages between her and a Metro homicide detective who had been working the case.

Connie was found dead in August 2022, and Andress-Tobiasson was found dead in January 2023, each of self-inflicted gunshot wounds. The Clark County Coroner's Office ruled Andress-Tobiasson's death a suicide. Although a number of people allegedly involved in local sex trafficking were declared either persons of interest or suspects in the case, as of October 2024 no arrests had been made in the killings of Land and Kauffman.

== Background ==
Prostitution is legal in certain counties of the US state of Nevada, but it is illegal in Clark County, home of Las Vegas. In 2022, it was estimated that the legal prostitution trade in Nevada generates $75 million per annum (equivalent to $83 million in 2025), which in turn fuels illicit prostitution activity in Las Vegas proper to the tune of $5 billion per annum. Sex trafficking is illegal in the entire United States.

In May 2015, Melanie Andress-Tobiasson's 16-year-old daughter Sarah found work in a local clothing store named Top Knotch. Sarah noticed illegal activity in and around the shop involving sex trafficking, and reported it to her mother, a Las Vegas judge. Andress-Tobiasson, suspecting that her daughter was in danger of being entrapped by pimps at the shop, handed over this information to the Las Vegas Metropolitan Police Department (also known as Metro). She strongly urged vice detectives to investigate the shop owner, Shane "Suga" Valentine. She expected the establishment to be quickly shut down. After she saw that nothing had been done, Andress-Tobiasson began to suspect that Metro refused to investigate certain traffickers because they were working with them in order to arrest their competitors. After a meeting with Clark County Sheriff Joe Lombardo came to naught, she forced her way into Valentine's home in order to confront him about his illicit activities and warn him off of her daughter.

== Killings ==
In August 2016, Sydney Elysse Land (March 24, 1995 – October 26, 2016) a restaurant worker at The Palm in Caesars Palace, moved out of her parents' Las Vegas home and leased a unit at The Union apartments, located at 4550 South Hualapai Way in the southwest part of the Las Vegas Valley. According to Metro, Land and her boyfriend, Centennial High School athlete and alleged pimp Nehemiah "Neo" Kauffman (20) were last seen alive on the night of October 25 by Sydney’s friend, convicted prostitute Frankie Zappia. Dominique Thompson, Zappia's alleged pimp, was with her at the time. On October 26, unknown assailants entered the apartment and shot and killed Land and Kauffman. Kauffman had been shot in the head, and Land, who was shot in the face, was later determined by investigators to have died a slow death. Their bodies were found by a neighbor the next day at 12:40 p.m. Kauffman was found sprawled on the living room floor, and Land was found on the bedroom floor. The following day, Metro announced that they had no motive and no suspects in the shootings. However, they had reason to believe that two male perpetrators were involved and that there had been no forcible entry. After Land's father, fire department engineer Steve Land visited the apartment, he claimed that Metro left evidence behind there uncollected. He stated that they never interviewed him or his wife, Connie Land, after the killings, nor did they send a detective to their home to go over Land's room.

== Investigation ==
Valentine, an associate of Kauffman's, was soon declared a person of interest in the case. This pronouncement stemmed from events that occurred on October 8 when, during a heated exchange of texts, Kauffman accused Valentine of being a police informant. Valentine then threatened to kill Kauffman, along with Land and her girlfriend, while they were all at the Red Rock Casino. Later that day, after Kauffman went to his mother's home, Valentine rammed his rental car into the home's garage, and shot bullets into the dwelling. No injuries were reported as a result of this incident. A crime scene analyst recovered some items from the home that day, including pieces of plastic and an emblem from the car, along with a boulder that had been thrown into a window, but a bullet was only recovered on October 30, after the killings of Land and Kauffman. A search warrant was then put out for Valentine's arrest. Investigators later determined that after the killings, Valentine had driven to California in the same vehicle used in the garage incident. They said that they recovered the text messages that Valentine had sent to Kauffman which contained death threats. Valentine stood accused of attempting to recruit the daughter of a judge into a life of prostitution. He was subsequently arrested, and arraigned on account of the October 8 firearms discharges, with bail set at $50,000. He agreed to a plea deal on the firearms charges in March 2017, and was incarcerated at Warm Springs Correctional Center. Though she was present at Valentine's hearing, Connie Land was not permitted to make a victim impact statement because the charges he faced were not related to Land's killing. No one from Kauffman's family was present, and Valentine was never charged with the murders. Although he had been cleared by Metro of being a person of interest in the case a year after the killings, by October 2018 they had renewed their interest in Valentine. As of August 2019, he remained incarcerated at Warm Springs.

In early 2017, Connie contacted the Investigation Discovery television network, and reached out to private investigators, in the hopes of getting information as to who had killed her daughter. Andress-Tobiasson contacted Connie in May upon discovering that they had shared concerns about sex trafficking in Las Vegas. According to the Las Vegas Review-Journal, Andress-Tobiasson believed that Valentine was responsible for the killings, and conveyed this belief to Connie. She compelled Connie to hand over confidential text messages relevant to the investigation the latter had received from a Metro homicide detective who was handling the case. Andress-Tobiasson expressed the belief that she and her daughter Sarah were the killer's real intended targets, as a consequence of Metro revealing her as a source during an interview the day before the killings occurred, and Connie seconded this belief. Subsequently, the two women had a falling-out between them. Andress-Tobiasson had been advising Connie about which Metro detective in her opinion was more trustworthy to deal with. Andress-Tobiasson later claimed that an acquaintance in the Federal Bureau of Investigation, with whom she was conversing via burner phone in order to ensure confidentiality of the discussions, would soon be contacting Connie in regards to the case, although this never came to pass. With a belief that Metro was dragging its feet in regard to the investigation, the Land family began to publicize the case via digital billboards. The campaign, which at times consisted of as many as 7 billboards operating simultaneously—which could be clearly seen by drivers traversing the Oran K. Gragson Expressway, the Las Vegas Freeway and the Las Vegas Beltway—cost the family $4,500 per day. Connie tried to keep the public's attention focused on the case by posting about it frequently on social media, and by appearing periodically at press conferences.

On April 12, 2018, Andress-Tobiasson appeared in an interview on KLAS-TV. She expressed her belief that sex traffickers were specifically targeting daughters of judges and law-enforcement personnel. She maintained that Metro was not interested in targeting shops serving as fronts for prostitution, adding that she was more afraid of the police than the sex traffickers themselves. Metro officers began submitting complaints about Andress-Tobiasson to Lombardo, accusing her of ethics violations in regard to her personal interest in the investigation of the goings-on at Top Knotch. According to the Nevada Current, around this time Metro named Zappia and Thompson as suspects in the killings of Land and Kauffman. As of August 2019, Thompson remained in prison on firearms charges. As of October 2024, no arrests had yet been made in the case.

== Aftermath ==
In September 2020, Andress-Tobiasson faced eight charges of judicial misconduct levied at her by the Nevada Commission on Judicial Discipline (NCJD). In May 2021, after making a deal with prosecutors, she resigned her judgeship in return for the NCJD dropping the ongoing ethics inquiry surrounding her interest in the double-murder investigation. As part of the deal, she promised to never again seek a judgeship, elected or appointed, in Las Vegas.

Connie Land was found dead in August 2022. According to KTNV-TV, the death was ruled a suicide. On January 20, 2023, Andress-Tobiasson, who had only recently settled a divorce with her husband, died from a gunshot wound in her Las Vegas home at age 55. The Clark County Coroner's Office ruled her death a suicide. Dana Gentry, a Las Vegas blogger and acquaintance of Andress-Tobiasson told the New York Post, "I can't tell you how many times Melanie told me, 'If I wind up dead, remember I wasn't suicidal."

== See also ==
- List of unsolved murders (2000–present)
- Misconduct in the Las Vegas Metropolitan Police Department
