= CSI: Crime Scene Investigation season 1 =

American TV show season

CSI: Crime Scene Investigation
- Season 1
- Season 1 U.S. DVD cover
- Starring: William Petersen; Marg Helgenberger; Gary Dourdan; George Eads; Jorja Fox; Paul Guilfoyle
- No. of episodes: 23

Release
- Original network: CBS
- Original release: October 6, 2000 – May 17, 2001

Season chronology
- Next → Season 2

The first season of CSI: Crime Scene Investigation premiered on CBS on October 6, 2000, and ended on May 17, 2001. The series stars William Petersen and Marg Helgenberger.

== Plot ==
It's all change at the Las Vegas Crime Lab following the shooting death of Holly Gribbs ("Pilot"), yet the team still find themselves tasked with solving the bizarre, the brutal, and the impossible. Under the supervision of new Supervisor Gil Grissom, and his second-in-command Catherine Willows, the team investigate the suicide of a casino jackpot winner ("Cool Change"), the abduction and burial of a young woman ("Crate 'n Burial"), the discovery of a severed leg ("Pledging Mr. Johnson"), the murder of a Catholic school dean ("Friends & Lovers"), the discovery of a skeleton under the house ("Who are You?"), a murder on an airliner ("Unfriendly Skies"), the stabbing deaths of an entire family ("Blood Drops"), and a series of staged suicides ("Anonymous"). Meanwhile, Brown struggles with a gambling addiction, Sidle adjusts to life in Las Vegas, and Brass reacquaints himself with the Homicide squad.

== Cast ==
=== Changes ===
Jorja Fox joins the main cast in the second episode.

=== Main cast ===
- William Petersen as CSI Level 3 Night Shift Supervisor Dr. Gil Grissom
- Marg Helgenberger as CSI Level 3 Assistant Night Shift Supervisor Catherine Willows
- Gary Dourdan as CSI Level 3 Warrick Brown
- George Eads as CSI Level 3 Nick Stokes
- Jorja Fox as CSI Level 3 Sara Sidle (episodes 2–23)
- Paul Guilfoyle as LVPD Homicide Unit Captain Jim Brass

=== Recurring cast ===
- Eric Szmanda as DNA Technician Greg Sanders
- Robert David Hall as Clark County Coroner's Office Chief Medical Examiner Dr. Al Robbins
- Skip O'Brien as LVPD Homicide Detective Sergeant Ray O'Riley
- David Berman as Clark County Coroner's Office Assistant Medical Examiner Dr. David Phillips
- Glenn Morshower as Clark County Sheriff Brian Mobley
- Judith Scott as Clark County Coroner's Office Medical Examiner Dr. Jenna Williams
- Madison McReynolds as Lindsey Willows
- Pamela Gidley as Consultant Forensic Anthropologist Specialist Teri Miller
- Joseph Patrick Kelly as LVPD Officer Joe Metcalf
- Gerald McCullouch as Ballistics Expert Bobby Dawson
- Marc Vann as CSI Day Shift Supervisor Conrad Ecklie
- Krista Allen as Kristy Hopkins
- Timothy Carhart as Eddie Willows
- Matt O'Toole as Paul Millander
- Sheeri Rappaport as Fingerprint Technician Mandy Webster
- Eric Stonestreet as Questionable Documents Technician Ronnie Litre
- Chandra West as CSI Level 1 Holly Gribbs
- Tony Amendola as Forensic Document Examiner Professor Rambar
- Brigid Brannagh as Tammy Felton
- Susan Gibney as Charlotte Meridian
- Aldis Hodge as Tony Thorpe, a.k.a. The Parking Garage Rapist.
- Geoffrey Rivas as LVPD Homicide Detective Sam Vega

== Episodes ==
No. overall	No. in season	Title	Directed by	Written by	Original release date	Prod. code	US viewers (millions)
1	1	"Pilot"	Danny Cannon	Anthony E. Zuiker	October 6, 2000	100	17.30
A suicide appears to be a murder with little evidence. Nick and Warrick compete to solve their 100th case to become a CSI level 3. Nick's case is a man who was drugged and robbed by a hooker and Warrick's is a murder where the killer claims self-defense. After Warrick breaks protocol to get a warrant, he is forced to babysit Holly Gribbs. The episode ends with the team celebrating Nick being promoted to CSI Level 3 when Brass comes in to inform them that Holly has been shot.
2	2	"Cool Change"	Michael Watkins	Anthony E. Zuiker	October 13, 2000	101	15.80
In the aftermath of the shooting that has left rookie CSI Holly Gribbs fighting for her life, there are big changes in store at the Vegas Crime Lab. Brass is sent back to Homicide while Grissom becomes the newly appointed head of the crime lab and is also in charge of the night shift. His first case is to investigate the supposed suicide of a jackpot winner with Nick. Meanwhile, Warrick has to deal with the fact that the shooting of Holly was due to his failure to supervise her, having abandoned her while placing a bet for Judge Cohen; furthermore, the judge informed Warrick that he placed a wrong bet, forcing Warrick to make up the losses, as well as to work for him on the side at his pleasure. Catherine decides to work Holly's shooting and is annoyed when Grissom brings in Sara Sidle, a CSI from the San Francisco Police Department, to help with her investigation. Unfortunately, Holly succumbs to her injuries, leaving the team devastated. (First appearance of Paula Francis, anchorwoman for CBS affiliate KLAS-TV, reporting on the shooting of Holly Gribbs. She would appear in numerous episodes reporting on crimes involving the CSIs for KLAS-TV.)
3	3	"Crate 'n Burial"	Danny Cannon	Ann Donahue	October 20, 2000	103	14.23
The search is on for Grissom, Nick, and Sara when an abducted woman is said to be buried underground. Meanwhile a hit and run death of a little girl is investigated by Catherine and Warrick, where the suspects are a 70-year-old man (John Beasley) and his teenage grandson who both seem to be covering for each other.
4	4	"Pledging Mr. Johnson"	R.J. Lewis	Josh Berman & Anthony E. Zuiker	October 27, 2000	104	14.89
A woman's severed leg found in Lake Mead leads Grissom and Catherine to uncover a case of adultery. Meanwhile, Sara and Nick investigate a fraternity student's apparent suicide, but find out that the student's pledging has gone terribly wrong. Also, Warrick officially achieved CSI Level 3; however, he still remained under Judge Cohen's thumb, as he wanted him to tamper with the evidence related to a rape case, whose trial was in progress. Warrick, however, has other plans for the judge.
5	5	"Friends & Lovers"	Lou Antonio	Andrew Lipsitz	November 3, 2000	105	15.16
Grissom and Warrick investigate when a victim dies of fear in the desert, apparently from being chased; Grissom would later discover that the victim consumed an exotic tea containing jimson weed that was distributed at a rave. Meanwhile, Catherine and Nick investigate the gruesome murder of a Catholic school dean. Sara investigates how the body of a woman who was buried the previous week ended up in a dumpster, leading to an unscrupulous practice of "time-share coffins". (First appearance of Assistant Medical Examiner Dr. David Phillips (David Berman).)
6	6	"Who Are You?"	Danny Cannon	Carol Mendelsohn & Josh Berman	November 10, 2000	106	15.03
Grissom and Nick investigate after a plumber discovered a skeleton of a woman under a house, buried in cement. Meanwhile, Catherine investigates a case in which her ex-husband Eddie is accused of rape. Warrick and Sara search for a missing bullet that could either exonerate or indict a cop for murder, though Brass was pressuring the team to hurry up with their investigation. (This is the first appearance of Coroner Dr. Al Robbins (Robert David Hall).)
7	7	"Blood Drops"	Kenneth Fink	Story by : Tish McCarthy; Teleplay by : Ann Donahue	November 17, 2000	107	15.74
When four members of a family are brutally murdered, two daughters are the sole survivors. The sheriff is anxious to provide the press with details, but hardly has anything to provide, as Grissom and his team are still examining the evidence. They suspect a cult murder, but the evidence tells an even more disturbing story. (This is the first appearance of Conrad Ecklie (Marc Vann), introduced as the Day Shift Supervisor of the CSI department.)
8	8	"Anonymous"	Danny Cannon	Eli Talbert & Anthony E. Zuiker	November 24, 2000	108	13.24
When another staged suicide takes place that was almost a duplicate of the "suicide" that took place in the pilot, Grissom realizes he is dealing with a serial killer who has a thorough knowledge of forensic science. The trail of evidence would lead to the same suspect - Paul Millander, who once again managed to stay ahead of the CSIs. Meanwhile, Warrick and Nick investigate a tourist's car that fell off a cliff, with the victim surviving his injuries - they would try to determine if it was an accident, a murder attempt, or even perhaps neither. (This is the first appearance of Fingerprint Technician Mandy Webster (Sheeri Rappaport ).)
9	9	"Unfriendly Skies"	Michael Shapiro	Story by : Andrew Lipsitz; Teleplay by : Andrew Lipsitz & Carol Mendelsohn & Anthony E. Zuiker	December 8, 2000	109	15.65
Grissom and his team investigate the death of a first class passenger on a flight to Las Vegas. Their investigation is a race against time, because after 12 hours the FBI will take over. To make matters worse, the other first class passengers are very reluctant to co-operate, leading the team to consider that they had some involvement in their fellow passenger's death. Note: Based on the events of Southwest Airlines Flight 1763, which happened August 11, 2000, not long before production of this episode began.
10	10	"Sex, Lies and Larvae"	Thomas J. Wright	Josh Berman & Ann Donahue	December 22, 2000	110	14.88
Grissom and Sara investigate when hikers found a body of a woman in the desert, covered with insects. Grissom uses entomological evidence to discover the time of death. Unfortunately their prime suspect - the husband - was out of town at that time, and to Sara's dismay, it looks like he is getting away with murder. Meanwhile Warrick and Catherine try to find out who stole a painting. Nick deals with a missing persons case when a woman's car is found at a bus station. Also: Ecklie informs Grissom that Warrick was caught gambling during working hours.
11	11	"The I-15 Murders"	Oz Scott	Carol Mendelsohn	January 12, 2001	102	17.49
When a woman is abducted from a supermarket, Grissom finds a text on a bathroom door that leads him to believe that five women have been murdered. Investigation would later uncover a string of abductions from supermarkets along the Interstate 15 corridor between California and Utah, leading to the team to hunt down the murderer before he strikes again. Meanwhile, Warrick and Sara are at odds with each other after the former was spotted at a casino, allegedly gambling, though he was actually there to collect a debt that he'd been owed. They would both put personal differences aside to investigate the apparent murder and robbery of a man who has been found by his brother. Nick has to come to the rescue of his friend, Kristy Hopkins, again when she gets into a scuffle with a hotel security guard.
12	12	"Fahrenheit 932"	Danny Cannon	Jacqueline Zambrano	February 1, 2001	111	21.26
A man on death row for killing his wife and son in an arson fire sends a video tape to Grissom, urging him to reinvestigate the case, as he thought the evidence used to prosecute him was flawed. Grissom, Sara and Warrick reexamine the evidence on hand and secure what they have missed the first time, discovering that Ecklie, who still stood by his findings, did some sloppy work. Meanwhile, Catherine and Nick investigate the death of a teenage 'runner', who was shot at close range in a parking lot.
13	13	"Boom"	Kenneth Fink	Josh Berman & Ann Donahue & Carol Mendelsohn	February 8, 2001	112	21.45
Grissom, Sara and Warrick investigate when a bomb goes off in a Vegas office building, killing a security guard. The prime suspect is the other security guard, who is over-helpful and also has the knowledge to make a bomb; he would be cleared after another bomb, at a car rental lot, exploded. After Nick spends the night with Kristy Hopkins while an old college classmate from Texas was in town, she is found strangled to death. With his DNA and fingerprints on the scene and Ecklie on the case, Nick's career is on the line.
14	14	"To Halve and to Hold"	Lou Antonio	Andrew Lipsitz & Ann Donahue	February 15, 2001	113	21.95
When a boy and his dog discovered a single human bone in the desert, Grissom, Catherine and Nick scour the desert to piece the skeleton together; it would later connect to an elderly woman whose husband died naturally years before, but refused to report the death. Meanwhile, Warrick and Sara investigate the death of a male stripper who died shortly after performing at a bachelorette party at a motel.
15	15	"Table Stakes"	Danny Cannon	Story by : Elizabeth Devine; Teleplay by : Anthony E. Zuiker & Carol Mendelsohn	February 22, 2001	114	20.88
During a fundraiser at the home of Portia Richmond – a legendary showgirl – a dead woman is found floating in the pool. When Portia later disappears, suspicion falls on a young couple who 'house-sat' for her. The Sheriff puts pressure on Grissom as well, as Portia's case affects his election. Also: Warrick looks into a mob hit in a glass elevator.
16	16	"Too Tough to Die"	Richard J. Lewis	Elizabeth Devine	March 1, 2001	115	23.72
Sara gets emotionally involved when she, Grissom, and Nick investigate the case of a woman who is abducted from a parking garage and later turns up on a stretch of road, having been raped, shot and left for dead. Meanwhile, Catherine and Warrick take over a case from one of the dayshift CSIs who has quit due to burnout; the case involves a neighbor's dispute that led to murder. Not only has an important piece of evidence been lost, but the case goes to trial in four days. Grissom would become concerned for Sara, as she focused on the abduction case and all her hobbies were related to crime; he feared that Sara, too, would eventually suffer from burnout. (First appearance of Detective Sam Vega (Geoffrey Rivas).)
17	17	"Face Lift"	Lou Antonio	Josh Berman	March 8, 2001	116	23.00
Grissom, Nick and Catherine handle a case in which the fingerprints of a victim in an old kidnapping case turn up at the scene of a man found dead at a gardening center in what they initially thought was a heist gone wrong; further investigation would not only prove the now-grown kidnapped child was still alive, but was also a suspect. Meanwhile, Sara and Warrick investigate the case of a woman who was incinerated in her easy chair; Sara suspects it is a case of spontaneous human combustion, but Warrick was unwilling to call it that easy. (Guest starred Reginald VelJohnson as Dr. Philip Kane.)
18	18	"$35K O.B.O."	Roy H. Wagner	Eli Talbert	March 29, 2001	117	21.57
A single witness at a rain-soaked scene of a double homicide tells the story of a carjacking gone wrong. After the car is found and becomes a new crime scene, the case becomes far more complicated. Meanwhile, Catherine investigates the collapse of an apartment building that killed three senior citizens; while the owner was initially fingered for shoddy construction, they discovered that age and location - near Nellis Air Force Base - played a role in the collapse.
19	19	"Gentle, Gentle"	Danny Cannon	Ann Donahue	April 12, 2001	118	23.24
Grissom's team investigates the kidnapping of the infant child of a rich family. However, when the evidence shows that the family is hiding something, the case takes a darker turn, leading to Grissom to become personally vested in the case, despite his recommendation to Sara in Too Tough to Die not to get personally involved. (Guest starred Reginald VelJohnson, reprising his role as Dr. Philip Kane.)
20	20	"Sounds of Silence"	Peter Markle	Josh Berman & Andrew Lipsitz	April 19, 2001	119	23.50
Grissom, Sara and Warrick investigate a deaf man who was run over by a car. However, further investigation shows that he died before the car even struck him: a victim of a malicious hit-and-run by another car. The team's encounters with the reluctant dean of the deaf man's school reveals a secret about Grissom. Meanwhile, Catherine and Nick investigate an apparent mob hit that leaves five dead in a coffee shop.
21	21	"Justice Is Served"	Thomas J. Wright	Jerry Stahl	April 26, 2001	120	22.33
Grissom, Nick, and Warrick investigate a jogger who was killed by a vicious dog in the park. The case gets complicated when they discover that the jogger's liver was surgically removed after he was killed. Meanwhile Sara and Catherine investigate the death of a six-year-old girl in the Tunnel of Love at a carnival; Catherine would become emotionally involved after learning that a carny working the ride had a prior criminal record of sexual molestation of minors.
22	22	"Evaluation Day"	Kenneth Fink	Anthony E. Zuiker	May 10, 2001	121	18.90
On the day Grissom has to evaluate his team, Grissom and Catherine deal with a severed head that was found in the trunk of a stolen car that was driven by joyriding girls. Sara and Nick investigate a headless body in the desert that appears to have fallen from the sky; while they suspected that it was related to the severed head, it not only does not match the body, they also believe the anatomy was too large for a human. Meanwhile, Warrick investigates a murder in a juvenile detention center in which his young friend James is the only witness.
23	23	"The Strip Strangler"	Danny Cannon	Ann Donahue	May 17, 2001	122	18.98
Grissom and his team investigate a series of murders by a signature killer. The killer has enough knowledge of forensic science to leave little evidence behind. When the investigation seems to be at a dead end, the sheriff brings in the FBI, to Grissom's dismay. Grissom's anger only grows when they want to lure out the killer, with Sara as bait. (Guest starred Rainn Wilson.)

== Format ==
This is the only season of the CSI franchise that was broadcast in the 4:3 aspect ratio. It was, however, filmed in 16:9, and the widescreen versions of the episodes are present on the Blu-ray release.
