= CSI: Crime Scene Investigation season 3 =

American TV show season

CSI: Crime Scene Investigation
- Season 3
- Season 3 U.S. DVD cover
- Starring: William Petersen; Marg Helgenberger; Gary Dourdan; George Eads; Jorja Fox; Eric Szmanda; Robert David Hall; Paul Guilfoyle
- No. of episodes: 23

Release
- Original network: CBS
- Original release: September 26, 2002 – May 15, 2003

Season chronology
- ← Previous; Season 2 Next → Season 4

The third season of CSI: Crime Scene Investigation premiered on CBS on September 26, 2002, and ended May 15, 2003. The series stars William Petersen and Marg Helgenberger.

== Plot ==
Grissom begins to suffer from hearing loss ("Inside the Box"), as Catherine faces the possibility of losing her daughter ("Lady Heather's Box") during the third season of CSI. Alongside their team, including Sara Sidle, Warrick Brown, Nick Stokes, and Jim Brass, Willows and Grissom investigate the death of a poker player ("Revenge is Best Served Cold"), the evisceration of a cheerleader ("Let the Seller Beware"), a death at a little persons convention ("A Little Murder"), the overdose of a rock-star ("Abra-Cadaver"), a jewelry heist ("Fight Night"), a mob murder ("Blood Lust"), the discovery of a body covered in fire-ants ("Snuff"), and a drive-by shooting ("Random Acts of Violence"). Meanwhile, the team are faced with their own past when they testify in court ("The Accused is Entitled"), Sara struggles to cope with the psychological trauma that she is suffering from being caught up in the explosion ("Play with Fire"), and one of Doc Robbins' autopsies goes awry when the victim wakes up ("Got Murder?").

== Cast ==
=== Changes ===
Eric Szmanda and Robert David Hall, who joined the recurring cast in season one, become main cast members this season.

=== Main cast ===
- William Petersen as CSI Level 3 Night Shift Supervisor Gil Grissom
- Marg Helgenberger as CSI Level 3 Assistant Night Shift Supervisor Catherine Willows
- Gary Dourdan as CSI Level 3 Warrick Brown
- George Eads as CSI Level 3 Nick Stokes
- Jorja Fox as CSI Level 3 Sara Sidle
- Eric Szmanda as DNA Technician Greg Sanders
- Robert David Hall as Clark County Coroner's Office Chief Medical Examiner Dr. Al Robbins
- Paul Guilfoyle as LVPD Homicide Unit Captain Jim Brass

=== Recurring cast ===
- David Berman as Dr. David Phillips
- Archie Kao as Archie Johnson
- Gerald McCullouch as Bobby Dawson
- Romy Rosemont as Jacqui Franco
- Jeffrey D. Sams as Det. Cyrus Lockwood
- Wallace Langham as David Hodges
- Christopher Wiehl as Hank Peddigrew
- Joseph Patrick Kelly as Officer Joe Metcalf
- Skip O'Brien as Sgt. Ray O'Riley
- Geoffrey Rivas as Det. Sam Vega

=== Guest cast ===
- Scott Wilson as Sam Braun
- Timothy Carhart as Eddie Willows
- Melinda Clarke as Lady Heather
- Pamela Gidley as Teri Miller
- Eric Stonestreet as Ronnie Litre
- Jules Sylvester as Jake
- Carmine Giovinazzo as Thumpy G.

== Episodes ==
No. overall	No. in season	Title	Directed by	Written by	Original release date	Prod. code	US viewers (millions)
47	1	"Revenge Is Best Served Cold"	Danny Cannon	Anthony E. Zuiker & Carol Mendelsohn	September 26, 2002	302	30.47
Grissom, Sara and Warrick investigate when a poker player drops dead at the table during a high-stakes game. Nick and Catherine investigate a dead body found in an abandoned air strip, which leads them to the world of street racing. (Guest starred Cliff DeYoung.)
48	2	"The Accused Is Entitled"	Kenneth Fink	Ann Donahue & Elizabeth Devine	October 3, 2002	301	28.47
When a famous movie star (played by Chad Michael Murray) is accused of a double murder, his lawyer hires Grissom's former mentor to find errors in the CSIs' work. Things get even worse when their personal lives are used against them in the pre-trial hearing – especially Grissom, who worries that his hearing problem may affect his credibility. (Also featuring The Wallflowers, in a performance in the episode's cold open.)
49	3	"Let the Seller Beware"	Richard J. Lewis	Andrew Lipsitz & Anthony E. Zuiker	October 10, 2002	303	30.73
Grissom, Catherine, Nick and Warrick investigate when a wealthy couple is murdered at their house, which was up for sale. Meanwhile Sara is sent to a local high school where a cheerleader was found eviscerated on the football field.
50	4	"A Little Murder"	Tucker Gates	Naren Shankar & Ann Donahue	October 17, 2002	304	30.81
Grissom, Sara and Nick suspect murder when the body of a dwarf is found hanging from a rope above the stage at a Little People's convention. Catherine and Warrick investigate a murder during a home invasion. While processing the scene, Catherine is attacked by the suspect.
51	5	"Abra-Cadaver"	Danny Cannon	Anthony E. Zuiker & Danny Cannon	October 31, 2002	306	28.95
Grissom, Warrick and Sara investigate when a woman who was already missing disappears while taking part in a magician's act. Things get worse when the magician burns to death on the stage after his disappearing chamber malfunctions. But Grissom soon discovers that all is not what it seems. Nick and Catherine find evidence of murder when a rock star dies from an overdose in his tour bus.
52	6	"The Execution of Catherine Willows"	Kenneth Fink	Carol Mendelsohn & Elizabeth Devine	November 7, 2002	305	27.86
Fifteen years ago, Catherine helped to put "The Blue Paint Killer" John Mathers on death row for the rape and murder of a young student at a local college. At the very last second on the day of his execution, he's granted a stay based on new DNA evidence. The CSIs have limited time to provide new evidence that would allow the execution to continue; otherwise, Mathers would get a new trial. Meanwhile, Grissom, Nick and Sara are looking for a missing student, who is found murdered and left in exactly the same fashion as the women in Catherine's case, suspecting a copycat crime.
53	7	"Fight Night"	Richard J. Lewis	Andrew Lipsitz & Naren Shankar	November 14, 2002	307	29.94
Grissom, Sara and Warrick investigate when a boxer dies in the ring during a boxing match; they would discover that not only the fight was rigged, but it was also set up for murder. Nick quickly solves a robbery at a jewelry store, but finds reason not to close the case just yet. Catherine investigates when a gang member is shot at a parking lot. They would later determine that all three cases would have the same connections with each other.
54	8	"Snuff"	Kenneth Fink	Ann Donahue & Bob Harris	November 21, 2002	308	25.97
Catherine, Sara and Warrick are left without a body or crime scene when a snuff film shows the real murder of a young woman. Meanwhile Grissom and Nick are trying to find the identity and killer of a body found in a tool chest, covered with fire ants; the evidence would point to a ranch, where a bigoted cowboy was bullying a young man with Down syndrome. (Guest starred Niecy Nash.)
55	9	"Blood Lust"	Charlie Correll	Josh Berman & Carol Mendelsohn	December 5, 2002	309	29.74
A taxi driver is beaten to death by a mob after running over a boy with his taxi. When Grissom arrives at the scene, he finds out that the boy was already dying from a stab wound. When Grissom and Sara find the actual crime scene at a basketball court, they discover the body of a man that was shot to death. Are the two murders related? George Eads who plays Nick Stokes did not appear in this episode
56	10	"High and Low"	Richard J. Lewis	Eli Talbert & Naren Shankar	December 12, 2002	310	25.89
Grissom, Nick and Warrick investigate when a body falls from the sky and lands between a couple of rollerbladers. But soon Grissom's problem with otosclerosis forces him to leave the case to Nick and Warrick. Grissom's otologist would recommend that he schedule surgery soon to rectify his hearing problem. Nick and Warrick, carrying on with their case, would determine it was a bizarre murder by paragliding. Meanwhile, Catherine investigates the death of a man who was shot with his own gun, only to find out that someone else had shot him over a family dispute.
57	11	"Recipe for Murder"	Richard J. Lewis & J. Miller Tobin	Anthony E. Zuiker & Ann Donahue	January 9, 2003	311	25.48
Grissom and Catherine investigate when the chef of a fancy restaurant ends up in a meat grinder. They soon discover a lot more went on in the kitchen than cooking. Meanwhile Sara and Warrick find out that the apparent suicide of a young woman who suffered from bipolar disorder is actually a murder. (First appearance of lab technician David Hodges (Wallace Langham).)
58	12	"Got Murder?"	Kenneth Fink	Sarah Goldfinger	January 16, 2003	312	27.87
When bird watchers spotted a raven with a human eyeball in its beak, it is up to Catherine, Sara and Nick to find the rest of the body and the killer. Meanwhile, Phillips and Dr. Robbins discovered a corpse of a car salesman that still had a heartbeat, so they manage to save his life; after he died "twice", Grissom and Warrick find out who at his dealership wanted the man dead; originally suspected to have died of a heart attack, the evidence would point to a motive that would lead to murder.
59	13	"Random Acts of Violence"	Danny Cannon	Danny Cannon & Naren Shankar	January 30, 2003	313	27.48
When the nine-year-old daughter of Warrick's former mentor is killed in a drive-by shooting, Warrick lets his emotions lead him to assume a suspect, a former classmate of his, is guilty without looking at the evidence. Meanwhile Nick investigates when a man is found dead in a sealed computer room; all of the victim's employees had reason to kill him, but none of them claim to have seen a thing.
60	14	"One Hit Wonder"	Félix Enríquez Alcalá	Corey Miller	February 6, 2003	314	25.60
Grissom, Catherine, Nick and Warrick investigate a 'peeping Tom' who escalated into breaking into women's apartments and terrorizing them. Meanwhile Sara reopens the murder case of a colleague's husband. Left paralyzed, she undergoes an operation to retrieve the bullet from her neck that would identify her killer, with a chance that she may die during the operation.
61	15	"Lady Heather's Box"	Richard J. Lewis	Story by : Anthony E. Zuiker & Ann Donahue & Josh Berman & Bob Harris; Teleplay by : Carol Mendelsohn & Andrew Lipsitz & Naren Shankar & Eli Talbert	February 13, 2003	315	27.21
Grissom and Brass pay another visit to Lady Heather when one of her employees is found dead in a local club during a foam party. Meanwhile, Catherine is faced with a crisis when she has to save her daughter Lindsey from a flooded car and her former husband Eddie who was driving the car is found murdered. (First series appearance of Alimi Ballard, in a role of a music producer. He would have a supporting role as Detective Kevin Crawford beginning in Season 13.)
62	16	"Lucky Strike"	Kenneth Fink	Eli Talbert & Anthony E. Zuiker	February 20, 2003	316	28.05
After a police chase on the Las Vegas Strip, a man with a wooden stake lodged in the back of his head stumbles out of his car before dying; Grissom and Nick investigate, finding ties to a murder and a fraudulent scheme involving gold. Meanwhile, Catherine and Warrick try to find evidence when the 5-year-old son of a professional basketball player is kidnapped.
63	17	"Crash and Burn"	Richard J. Lewis	Josh Berman	March 13, 2003	317	28.60
Sara, Catherine and Warrick investigate a deadly car crash at a popular bar - many of its victims being employees at an insurance company that had placed a cancer victim's health in limbo. As they investigate, Sara finds out that her paramedic boyfriend Hank was not only first on the scene, but also that one of the survivors was his longtime girlfriend. Meanwhile, Grissom and Nick investigate the death of a woman who died of carbon monoxide poisoning; her husband, who was sleeping next to her, somehow survived with no ill effects. He and his son became potential suspects after Grissom and Nick found that the fireplace has been rigged.
64	18	"Precious Metal"	Deran Sarafian	Naren Shankar & Andrew Lipsitz	April 3, 2003	318	26.37
In the backcountry, two ATV bikers stumbled upon a barrel containing chemical waste, which later was determined to conceal a badly decomposed body; Catherine, Nick and Sara investigate the case, which would lead to a robot combat competition. Meanwhile, Greg helps Grissom and Warrick solve the murder of a man whose body is found in an alley, after being killed in his own home.
65	19	"A Night at the Movies"	Matt Earl Beesley	Story by : Carol Mendelsohn; Teleplay by : Danny Cannon & Anthony E. Zuiker	April 10, 2003	319	26.45
When a patron's cell phone goes off during a movie at a theater, an usher discovered that the man was murdered. Grissom and Catherine would discover that its murder weapon, a screwdriver, was found to possess glove prints. When the incriminating leather gloves are recovered the team discovers a unique combination of chemicals on them that lead them to a suspect. Meanwhile, Warrick, Nick and Sara investigate the death of a teenager found shot to death in a bullet-riddled warehouse, where more than 100 rounds were fired from every conceivable angle, but the teen was only hit once; they discovered that the victim was part of a group of teenage boys who participated in a series of Jackass-style stunts.
66	20	"Last Laugh"	Richard J. Lewis	Story by : Bob Harris & Carol Mendelsohn; Teleplay by : Bob Harris & Anthony E. Zuiker	April 24, 2003	320	25.22
Grissom and Catherine investigate the murder of a comic who dropped dead on stage after drinking from a bottle of water laced with naratriptamine. Warrick is sent to a convenience store to investigate the death of a 15-year-old boy only to find out the boy died after drinking the same brand of water, triggering a public health alert and a massive recall. Meanwhile; Brass asks Nick and Sara to investigate a case he ruled an accidental death after spotting the 'grieving' husband in a very expensive new car. (Guest starred Bobcat Goldthwait and Gilbert Gottfried.)
67	21	"Forever"	David Grossman	Sarah Goldfinger	May 1, 2003	321	22.67
Grissom, Nick and Catherine investigate when a horse trainer is found dead in the cargo bay of a private jet. At first it looks like the victim is trampled by the horse, but Grissom and his team soon discover the situation involved a diamond smuggling scheme, with the horse doubling as a mule. Meanwhile, Sara and Warrick investigate how two teens could have committed suicide in the middle of the desert, only to determine that it was murder following a custody dispute over the girl's baby.
68	22	"Play with Fire"	Kenneth Fink	Naren Shankar & Andrew Lipsitz	May 8, 2003	322	25.10
Grissom, Sara, and Nick investigate the murder of a young woman who was involved with a shady ex con, found dead in the press box of a high school stadium, found less than an hour after the woman's death. However, much of the evidence in that case would be endangered following an explosion in the DNA Lab that leaves Greg seriously injured and hospitalized. Catherine and Warrick try to find out who is responsible for what would be a workplace accident. Sara struggles to cope with the psychological trauma that she is suffering from being caught up in the explosion, while Grissom was still coping with his hearing problem, leading him to contemplate taking action.
69	23	"Inside the Box"	Danny Cannon	Carol Mendelsohn & Anthony E. Zuiker	May 15, 2003	323	23.87
The CSIs are called upon to investigate a bank robbery during which Detective Lockwood is shot and killed; the object of interest for the robbers being a safe deposit box. Things get personal for Catherine when the evidence leads to casino owner Sam Braun. Meanwhile, after Dr. Robbins discovered that Grissom's otosclerosis had actually worsened, Grissom finally makes a decision to undergo surgery.
