= List of CSI: Crime Scene Investigation characters =

CSI: Crime Scene Investigation is an American crime drama television series created by Anthony E. Zuiker and executive produced by Jerry Bruckheimer, Carol Mendelsohn, Ann Donahue, William Petersen, Cynthia Chvatal, Naren Shankar, and Don McGill, among others. It follows Las Vegas criminalists (identified as "Crime Scene Investigators") working for the Las Vegas Police Department as they use physical evidence to solve murders. Gil Grissom, a forensic entomologist, D.B. Russell, an esteemed botanist, and Julie Finlay and Catherine Willows, blood spatter experts with extensive knowledge of criminal psychology, head a team who are on the case 24/7, scouring the scene, collecting the evidence, and finding the missing pieces that will solve the mystery. Grissom and Willows were based upon real LVMPD Crime Scene Analysts David Holstein and Yolanda McClary.

== Main cast ==
CSI originally starred William Petersen and Marg Helgenberger alongside an ensemble including George Eads, Gary Dourdan, and Paul Guilfoyle. Jorja Fox joined the cast in episode two of the first season, whilst Eric Szmanda and Robert David Hall recurred throughout the first two seasons of the show before being promoted to regular status starting with the third. Louise Lombard, who first appeared in season five, joined the cast starting with season seven. The first major cast overhaul came with the show's eighth and ninth seasons. Lombard departed the cast in the first episode of season eight, whilst Fox departed in episode seven of the same season. Wallace Langham joined the main cast following Lombard's departure, having recurred since the third season. Fox would return for guest appearances during the ninth season in order to facilitate the departures of both Gary Dourdan and William Petersen, who were replaced by Lauren Lee Smith and Laurence Fishburne, respectively. Smith departed the cast at the end of her first year, and was replaced by a returning Jorja Fox, who featured in a recurring capacity. Liz Vassey and David Berman, who had recurred from season six, and season one, respectively, also joined the cast starting with season ten. Like Smith, Vassey departed the cast after a single season, and was replaced by Fox, who rejoined the main cast. William Petersen would appear in voice clips sporadically over the next three seasons. Fishburne departed the main cast at the end of season eleven, a season that featured guest appearances by Elisabeth Harnois and Louise Lombard, and was replaced by Ted Danson. Danson made his main cast debut alongside Elisabeth Harnois at the start of the twelfth season. Series lead Marg Helgenberger departed the main cast in the twelfth episode of season twelve and was replaced by Elisabeth Shue. Season thirteen saw Jon Wellner join the main cast after eight years a guest star. Helgenberger returned for a single episode in season fourteen, while Paul Guilfoyle departed at the end of the same year, followed by Elisabeth Shue and George Eads at the end of the fifteenth season. The show's finale, a two-hour film, featured the return of Helgenberger, Petersen, and Guilfoyle. The series finale marked their final appearances, as well as the final appearances of Fox, Szmanda, Hall, Langham, Berman, Harnois, and Wellner. Ted Danson went on to reprise his role of Russell during season two of Cyber.

Legend
= Main cast (credited)
= Recurring cast (3+)
= Guest cast (1–2)

Character	Actor	First episode (credited)	Final episode (credited)	Seasons															
Character	Actor	First episode (credited)	Final episode (credited)	1	2	3	4	5	6	7	8	9	10	11	12	13	14	15	Finale
Gil Grissom	William Petersen	"Pilot" (S1E01)	"Immortality" (guest) "One to Go" (S9E10; main credits)	M	M	M	M	M	M	M	M	M		R		R			G
Catherine Willows	Marg Helgenberger	"Pilot" (S1E01)	"Immortality" (guest) "Willows in the Wind" (S12E12; main credits)	M	M	M	M	M	M	M	M	M	M	M	M		R		G
Warrick Brown	Gary Dourdan	"Pilot" (S1E01)	"For Warrick" (S9E01)	M	M	M	M	M	M	M	M	M							
Nick Stokes	George Eads	"Pilot" (S1E01)	"The End Game" (S15E18)	M	M	M	M	M	M	M	M	M	M	M	M	M	M	M	
Jim Brass	Paul Guilfoyle	"Pilot" (S1E01)	"Immortality" (guest) "Dead in his Tracks" (S14E22; main credits)	M	M	M	M	M	M	M	M	M	M	M	M	M	M		G
Greg Sanders	Eric Szmanda	"Pilot" (S1E01)	"Immortality"	R	R	M	M	M	M	M	M	M	M	M	M	M	M	M	M
Sara Sidle	Jorja Fox	"Cool Change" (S1E02)	"Immortality"	M	M	M	M	M	M	M	M	R	R	M	M	M	M	M	M
Al Robbins	Robert David Hall	"Who Are You?" (S1E06)	"Immortality"	R	R	M	M	M	M	M	M	M	M	M	M	M	M	M	M
David Phillips	David Berman	"Friends and Lovers" (S1E05)	"Immortality"	R	R	R	R	R	R	R	R	R	M	M	M	M	M	M	M
David Hodges	Wallace Langham	"Recipe for Murder" (S3E11)	"Immortality"			R	R	R	R	R	M	M	M	M	M	M	M	M	M
Henry Andrews	Jon Wellner	"Iced" (S5E23)	"Immortality"					R	R	R	R	R	R	R	R	M	M	M	M
Sofia Curtis	Louise Lombard	"Formalities" (S5E07)	"Father of the Bride" (S11E20)					R	R	M	R			R					
Wendy Simms	Liz Vassey	"Secrets and Flies" (S6E06)	"Pool Shark" (S11E02)						R	R	R	R	M	R					
Riley Adams	Lauren Lee Smith	"Art Imitates Life" (S9E03)	"All In" (S9E24)									M							
Raymond Langston	Laurence Fishburne	"19 Down" (S9E09; guest) "The Grave Shift" (S9E11; main credits)	"In a Dark, Dark House" (S11E22)									M	M	M					
Morgan Brody	Elisabeth Harnois	"Cello and Goodbye" (S11E21)	"Immortality"											R	M	M	M	M	M
D.B. Russell	Ted Danson	"73 Seconds" (S12E01)	"Immortality"												M	M	M	M	M
Julie Finlay	Elisabeth Shue	"Seeing Red" (S12E14)	"The End Game" (S15E18)												M	M	M	M	

=== Main characters ===
Name	Actor	Seasons	Occupation(s)
Gil Grissom	William Petersen	1, 2, 3, 4, 5, 6, 7, 8, 9, 11, 13, "Immortality"	Graveyard shift CSI supervisor
Gil Grissom is a highly respected forensic entomologist with a doctoral degree in biology from the University of California. When testifying in court he is often addressed as "Doctor Grissom". He became a CSI around 1985 and departed the Las Vegas Crime Lab in 2009. After a short stint as a researcher, Grissom becomes a sea-life advocate and reunites with his ex-wife Sara. The series ends with the two sailing off together from the Port of San Diego.
Catherine Willows	Marg Helgenberger	1, 2, 3, 4, 5, 6, 7, 8, 9, 10, 11, 12, 14, "Immortality"	Graveyard shift CSI assistant supervisor
Catherine Willows is a blood-spatter analyst who joined the CSI team as a lab technician and worked her way up to assistant supervisor, later succeeding Grissom. After a stint as the graveyard shift CSI supervisor, Catherine is demoted following a departmental scandal, and later leaves Las Vegas to join the FBI as a special agent. During the series finale, a recently returned Willows is granted the directorship of the crime lab when Sidle leaves Las Vegas.
Warrick Brown	Gary Dourdan	1, 2, 3, 4, 5, 6, 7, 8, 9	CSI level III, audio-video analyst
Warrick Brown is an audio-video analyst and a native of Las Vegas with a major in chemistry from the University of Nevada, Las Vegas. A recovering gambling addict, Warrick is nonetheless skilled at his job. After being falsely accused, and acquitted, of murder, Brown is assassinated in his car by a corrupt high ranking policeman, Undersheriff Jeffrey McKeen. He dies in Grissom's arms.
Nick Stokes	George Eads	1, 2, 3, 4, 5, 6, 7, 8, 9, 10, 11, 12, 13, 14, 15	CSI level III
Nick Stokes graduated from Texas A&M and joined the Dallas Police prior to moving to Las Vegas. He was promoted to CSI level III in the pilot episode of the series and later became assistant night supervisor under Catherine Willows. Stokes was later demoted, and after remaining in Las Vegas a CSI III, he transfers to San Diego when he is granted the directorship of the SDPD Crime Lab.
Sara Sidle	Jorja Fox	1, 2, 3, 4, 5, 6, 7, 8, 9, 10, 11, 12, 13, 14, 15, "Immortality"	CSI level III, materials and element analyst
Sara Sidle is a materials and element analyst who majored in physics at Harvard University. Sara transferred from San Francisco at the behest of Grissom, whom she later marries. After a turbulent relationship and a divorce, Sara is promoted to director of the Las Vegas Crime Lab, though she relinquishes this position to reunite with her ex-husband, Grissom. Catherine then succeeds her as lab director.
Greg Sanders	Eric Szmanda	1, 2, 3, 4, 5, 6, 7, 8, 9, 10, 11, 12, 13, 14, 15, "Immortality"	CSI level III, DNA specialist
Greg Sanders is a DNA specialist who was educated in a private school for gifted students. Graduating Phi Beta Kappa from Stanford, Sanders joined the LVPD after a short stint with the SFPD. He later wrote a book about the history of Las Vegas. Greg believes in psychic powers, and is willing to sacrifice himself for what is right. Over the course of the series, Greg has several love interests. He expressed a romantic interest in fellow CSI Morgan Brody after meeting her in season 12.
Dr. Al Robbins	Robert David Hall	1, 2, 3, 4, 5, 6, 7, 8, 9, 10, 11, 12, 13, 14, 15, "Immortality"	Chief medical examiner
Al Robbins is the head county coroner of the LVPD. He is married with three children and has prosthetic legs, having lost his own legs after being hit by a drunk driver as a teenager. Al rarely leaves the crime lab, instead performing autopsies and referring specimens for forensic analysis. He forms strong bonds with both Gil Grissom and Raymond Langston.
Jim Brass	Paul Guilfoyle	1, 2, 3, 4, 5, 6, 7, 8, 9, 10, 11, 12, 13, 14, "Immortality"	LVPD Captain
Jim Brass was initially the CSI team's supervisor until losing the position after Holly Gribbs, a rookie CSI under his command, is murdered on her first day on the job. He is then given a position as the captain of the LVPD homicide division; from then on, Brass serves as the legal muscle for the CSI team and the one who does most of the arresting and interrogating of suspects. Brass later retires from the force to focus on his daughter, and takes a job at Catherine's casino, The Eclipse, as head of security, as seen in "Immortality".
David Phillips	David Berman	1, 2, 3, 4, 5, 6, 7, 8, 9, 10, 11, 12, 13, 14, 15, "Immortality"	Assistant medical examiner
David Phillips, known as "Super Dave", is the assistant coroner to Chief Medical Examiner Al Robbins. He received his self-styled nickname after saving the life of a victim during an autopsy. Though early in the series, his co-workers tease him about his supposed lack of social experience, he later marries a woman named Amy and has a child named Joshua. He is very close friends with his mentor, Robbins.
David Hodges	Wallace Langham	3, 4, 5, 6, 7, 8, 9, 10, 11, 12, 13, 14, 15, "Immortality"	Trace technician
David Hodges is a lab technician with a BA from Williams College; he previously worked in the LAPD crime lab, where his superiors felt he had an attitude problem. Hodges has an uncanny sense of smell, and is able to identify many key chemical compounds by their scent alone. Although shown to be a loner throughout the series, he forms a close bond with Morgan Brody.
Sofia Curtis	Louise Lombard	5, 6, 7, 8, 11	LVPD deputy chief
Sofia Curtis was a CSI who became assistant supervisor on graveyard, following a demotion from supervisor at the behest of Conrad Ecklie. She later makes a career switch to detective, working alongside Brass, and, rapidly rises through the ranks and becomes the LVPD's deputy chief. She develops a strong friendship with Grissom, much to the chagrin of Sara.
Henry Andrews	Jon Wellner	5, 6, 7, 8, 9, 10, 11, 12, 13, 14, 15, "Immortality"	DNA and toxicology technician
Henry Andrews was the toxicology specialist of the Las Vegas Forensics Laboratory, who mainly deals with identifying toxic substances that have undergone human consumption. He later cross-trains as a DNA specialist, replacing Simms. Andrews has a strong bond with all the lab rats, though particularly Hodges, with whom he has had a love–hate relationship. However, the two were seen having a much better relationship in later seasons.
Wendy Simms	Liz Vassey	6, 7, 8, 9, 10, 11	DNA technician
Wendy Simms worked in San Francisco before moving to Las Vegas to take the DNA tech position left vacant by Sanders. Hodges complains that she thinks she's "too cool" for the lab, as like Sanders, she expresses a desire to work in the field. She later becomes a crime-scene investigator in Portland to be closer to her sister. Simms had a brief relationship with Hodges.
Riley Adams	Lauren Lee Smith	9	CSI level II
Riley Adams is a former St. Louis police officer and a nonconformist who joined law enforcement to rebel against her parents, who are psychiatrists. She fits in well with the team initially, though this seems to stop following Grissom's departure. Unhappy with the new leadership of Willows, she departs Las Vegas, leaving a damning exit interview criticizing Catherine's leadership skills.
Dr. Raymond "Ray" Langston	Laurence Fishburne	9, 10, 11	CSI level II
Raymond Langston comes into contact with the CSI team in the course of a murder investigation and joins the Las Vegas Crime Lab as a level I CSI. Working under the leadership of Willows, Langston worries about his genetic makeup and natural predisposition to crime. Langston murders serial killer Nate Haskell during a brutal fight, while rescuing his ex-wife Gloria Parkes, who had been kidnapped, tortured, and raped by Haskell. Captain Brass is the first police officer at the crime scene. After seeing Gloria's condition, he ensures that Haskell's death is ruled as a justifiable homicide by self defense. Langston resigns to care for the traumatized Gloria, leaving a devastated crime lab in his wake.
Morgan Brody	Elisabeth Harnois	11, 12, 13, 14, 15, "Immortality"	CSI level III
Morgan Brody was a former member of LAPD SID and joins the Las Vegas PD CSI unit in the wake of the Nate Haskell scandal. She is the estranged daughter of Sheriff Conrad Ecklie, with whom she has a turbulent relationship. Brody is often seen partnered with Sanders, and she forms a strong friendship with Hodges, describing him as her "best friend". She is a skilled investigator.
D.B. Russell	Ted Danson	12, 13, 14, 15, "Immortality"	Graveyard shift CSI Supervisor
D.B. Russell was a skilled botanist and veteran crime scene investigator. Previously a crime lab director in Washington, Russell is hired to "clean house" in the wake of the Langston scandal. Russell becomes director of the Las Vegas Crime Lab, a position he holds until his departure following the events of "Immortality". He is married to Barbara and has four children and a granddaughter, Kaitlyn. Catherine Willows returns and succeeds him as director.
Julie Finlay	Elisabeth Shue	12, 13, 14, 15	Graveyard shift CSI assistant supervisor
Julie Finlay, known as "Finn" or "Jules", was a blood-spatter specialist who worked for Russell in Seattle; Russell asks her to leave Seattle to join the Las Vegas CSI crew. Finlay is hired following the departure of Willows and acts as a foil to D.B.'s laid-back management style. She is later attacked by Jared Briscoe, the Gig Harbor killer and left in a car trunk. After a short time in a coma, she succumbs to her injuries. Russell states that she will remain with him wherever he goes.

== Crossover characters ==
Several main characters from other series have appeared over the course of CSI's sixteen-season run.

- CSI: Miami stars David Caruso (Horatio Caine), Emily Procter (Calleigh Duquesne), Adam Rodriguez (Eric Delko), Rory Cochrane (Tim Speedle), and Khandi Alexander (Alexx Woods) appear in season 2, episode 23: "Cross Jurisdictions".
- CSI: NY star Gary Sinise (Mac Taylor) appears in season 13, episode 13: "In Vino Veritas".
- CSI: Cyber star Patricia Arquette (Avery Ryan) appears in both season 14, episode 21: "Kitty", and season 15, episode 6: "The Twin Paradox".
- CSI: Cyber star Ted Danson (D.B. Russell) first appeared in the lead role on CSI, starring from season 12, episode 1: "73 Seconds" through "Immortality".
- Without a Trace star Anthony LaPaglia (Jack Malone) appeared in season 8, episode 6: "Who and What...?"
- Level 26 character Black Sqweegel appears in season 11, episode 4: "Sqweegel". He is played by Daniel Browning Smith.

== Police officers ==
Due to the content of the series, a number of police officers are required to support the principal cast. Detectives, such as Frankie Reed and Sam Vega, are often seen arresting and interviewing suspects alongside the criminalists. Sheriffs and Undersheriffs act as an administrative and supervisory arm of the LVPD and often appear adversarial to the CSIs. Officers are most often seen entering and searching properties, although sometimes they are also seen involved in car chases or other forms of high speed pursuit.

Character	Actor	First Episode (credited)	Final Episode (credited)	Seasons															
Character	Actor	First Episode (credited)	Final Episode (credited)	1	2	3	4	5	6	7	8	9	10	11	12	13	14	15	Finale
Sheriffs and Undersheriffs
Conrad Ecklie	Marc Vann	1.07 "Blood Drops"	"Immortality"																
Brian Mobley	Glenn Morshower	1.07 "Blood Drops"	2.03 "Overload"																
Rory Atwater	Xander Berkeley	4.07 "Invisible Evidence"	5.07 "Formalities"																
Jeffrey McKeen	Conor O'Farrell	6.06 "Secrets & Files"	13.01 "Karma to Burn"																
Sherry Liston	Barbara Eve Harris	12.04 "Maid Man"	12.22 "Homecoming"																
Sergeants
Ray O'Riley	Skip O'Brien	1.01 "Pilot"	4.03 "Homebodies"																
Barclay	Lex Medlin	10.18 "Field Mice"	10.23 "Meat Jekyll"																
Detectives
Sam Vega	Geoffrey Rivas	1.16 "Too Tough to Die"	12.20 "Altered Stakes"																
Cyrus Lockwood	Jeffrey D. Sams	02.16 "Primum Non Nocere"	03.22 "Inside the Box"																
Lou Vartann	Alex Carter	4.09 "Grissom v. The Volcano"	13.11 "Dead Air"																
Chris Caviliere	José Zúñiga	4.16 "Getting Off"	10.11 "Sin City Blue"																
Carlos Moreno	Enrique Murciano	10.04 "Coup de Grace"	13.03 "Wildflowers"																
Frankie Reed	Katee Sackhoff	11.06 "Cold Blooded"	11.14 "All That Cremains"																
Kevin Crawford	Alimi Ballard	13.09 "Strip Maul"	15.16 "The Last Ride"																
Daniel Shaw	Mark Valley	15.01 "The CSI Effect"	15.18 "The End Game"																
Police Officers
Joe Metcalf	Joseph Patrick Kelly	1.20 "Sounds of Silence"	15.15 "Hero to Zero"																
David Fromansky	David Andrews	4.02 "All For Our Country"	4.14 "Paper or Plastic"																
Andy Akers	Larry Sullivan	4.07 "Invisible Evidence"	15.12 "Dead Woods"																
Larry Mitchell	Larry Mitchell	6.02 "Room Service"	16.02 "Immortality Part II"																
Daniel Pritchard	David Gianopoulos	8.17 "For Gedda"	09.01 "For Warrick"																
Officer Shelly	Shelli Bergh	11.20 "Father of the Bride"	12.05 "CSI Down"																
Lewis Norman	Lewis T. Powell	12.06 "Freaks & Geeks"	14.20 "Consumed"																
Paul Kimball	Peter Onorati	12.22 "Homecoming"	13.01 "Karma to Burn"																

== Relatives and friends ==
CSI focuses on the characters personal lives as well as their professional, therefore friends and relatives are seen often. Characters such as D.B. Russell, who have a stable home life, require large supporting families, while social introvert Gil Grissom's sole recurring social partner is Lady Heather, a dominatrix. This list is not definitive, and characters who have appeared only once are not listed.

Character (actor)	First episode (credited)	Final episode (credited)	Seasons															
Character (actor)	First episode (credited)	Final episode (credited)	1	2	3	4	5	6	7	8	9	10	11	12	13	14	15	Finale
Lindsey Willows (Katie Stevens, Kay Panabaker & Madison McReynolds)	01.01 "Pilot"	16.02 "Immortality Part II"																
Kristy Hopkins (Krista Allen)	01.01 "Pilot"	01.13 "Boom"																
Eddie Willows (Timothy Carhart)	01.06 "Who Are You?"	03.15 "Lady Heather's Box"																
Sam Braun (Scott Wilson & Dwier Brown)	02.01 "Burked"	11.02 "Pool Shark"																
Hank Peddigrew (Christopher Wiehl)	02.04 "Bully for You"	03.17 "Crash and Burn"																
Heather Kessler (Melinda Clarke)	02.08 "Slaves of Las Vegas"	16.02 "Immortality Part II"																
Ellie Rebecca Brass (Nicki Aycox & Teal Redmann)	02.10 "Ellie"	14.22 "Dead In His Tracks"																
Lily Flynn (Anita Gillette)	05.22 "Weeping Willows"	12.11 "Ms. Willows' Regrets"																
Bill Stokes (Andrew Prine)	05.24 "Grave Danger Vol. I"	05.25 "Grave Danger Vol. II"																
Jillian Stokes (Lois Chiles)	05.24 "Grave Danger Vol. I"	05.25 "Grave Danger Vol. II"																
Tina Brewster (Meta Golding)	06.04 "Shooting Stars"	13.07 "Fallen Angels"																
Eli Brown (Terrell Ransom, Jr)	09.01 "For Warrick"	13.07 "Fallen Angels"																
Gloria Parkes (Tracee Ellis Ross)	11.14 "All That Cremains"	11.22 "In a Dark, Dark House"																
Charlie Russell (Brandon Jones)	12.07 "Brain Doe"	13.06 "Pick and Roll"																
Olivia Hodges (Jaclyn Smith)	12.18 "Malice in Wonderland"	12.22 "Homecoming"																
Barbara Russell (Peri Gilpin)	12.22 "Homecoming"	14.06 "Passed Pawns"																
Kaitlyn Russell (Mia Hays)	12.22 "Homecoming"	13.01 "Karma to Burn"																
Maya Russell (Brooke Nevin)	12.22 "Homecoming"	15.13 "The Greater Good"																
Elisabetta Hodges (Catrinel Marlon)	13.12 "Double Fault"	14.04 "Last Supper"																
Nancy Brass (Annabella Sciorra)	13.22 "Skin in the Game"	14.01 "The Devil and D.B. Russell"																

== Criminalists ==
In addition to the CSIs and technicians of the main cast, several recurring actors appear in these roles. Characters such as Michael Keppler and Ronnie Lake appear for only a short period of time, for specific storylines, while other characters like Mandy Webster and Archie Johnson appear consistently in order to provide a specialty that is absent from the lead characters' résumés. As the series progresses, the number of supporting characters drops dramatically.

== Adversaries ==
Throughout the series, the CSIs have been forced to confront several recurring adversaries. These characters are usually serial killers, and their motives and M.O. vary greatly.

Character (actor)	First episode (credited)	Final episode (credited)	Seasons																Alias
Character (actor)	First episode (credited)	Final episode (credited)	1	2	3	4	5	6	7	8	9	10	11	12	13	14	15	Finale	Alias
Paul Millander (Matt O'Toole)	01.01 "Pilot"	02.13 "Identity Crisis"																	The Bathtub Killer
Jerrod Cooper (Garland Whitt)	01.01 "Pilot"	01.02 "Cool Change"																	—N/a
Judge Cohen (Harrison Young)	01.01 "Pilot"	01.04 "Pledging Mr. Johnson"																	N/A
Tony Thorpe (Aldis Hodge)	01.16 "Too Tough to Die"	09.02 "The Happy Place"																	The Parking Garage Rapist
Tammy Felton (Brigid Brannagh)	01.17 "Face Lift"	02.09 "And Then There Were None"																	Bonnie
Darin Hanson (Larry Holden)	01.17 "Face Lift"	02.09 "And Then There Were None"																	Clyde
Kevin Greer (Taylor Nichols)	03.06 "The Execution of Catherine Willows"	05.06 "What's Eating Gilbert Grissom?"																	The Blue Paint Killer
John Mathers (Victor Bevine)	03.06 "The Execution of Catherine Willows"	05.06 "What's Eating Gilbert Grissom?"																	The Blue Paint Killer
Cameron Klinefeld (Rudolf Martin)	04.01 "Assume Nothing"	04.02 "All For Our Country"																	The Klinefelds
Mandy Klinefeld (Sandra Hess)	04.01 "Assume Nothing"	04.02 "All For Our Country"																	The Klinefelds
Stuart Gardner (Scott Alan Smith)	04.01 "Assume Nothing"	04.02 "All For Our Country"																	N/A
Walter Gordon (John Saxon)	05.24 "Grave Danger, Part 1"	05.25 "Grave Danger, Part 2"																	N/A
Marlon West (Doug Smith)	06.18 "The Unusual Suspect"	08.07 "Goodbye & Good Luck"																	The West Siblings
Hannah West (Juliette Goglia)	06.18 "The Unusual Suspect"	08.07 "Goodbye & Good Luck"																	The West Siblings
William Cutler (Currie Graham)	06.23 "Bang-Bang"	06.24 "Way To Go"																	N/A
Joe Hirschoff (Kevin Rahm)	07.01 "Built to Kill, Part 1"	07.02 "Built to Kill, Part 2"																	N/A
Natalie Davis (Jessie Collins)	07.24 "Living Doll"	09.07 "Woulda, Shoulda, Coulda"																	The Miniature Killer
Terry Lee Wicker (John Hawkes)	08.06 "Who & What"	Without a Trace; 06.06 "Where & Why"																	N/A
Lou Gedda (John Capodice)	08.09 "Cockroaches"	08.17 "For Gedda"																	—N/a
Thomas Donover (Jimmi Simpson)	09.09 "19 Down"	09.10 "One To Go"																	The Dick & Jane Killer Copycat
Nate Haskell (Bill Irwin)	09.09 "19 Down"	11.22 "In a Dark, Dark House"																	The Dick & Jane Killer
Charles DiMasa (Matt Ross)	10.17 "Irradiator"	10.23 "Meat Jekyll"																	Doctor Jekyll
Jason McCann (Justin Bieber)	11.01 "Shock Waves"	11.15 "Targets of Obsession"																	—N/a
Laura Gabriel (Annabeth Gish)	12.09 "Zippered"	12.12 "Willows in the Wind"																	N/A
Ronald Basderic (Adam Harrington)	13.02 "Code Blue Plate Special"	13.15 "Forget Me Not"																	N/A
Matthew Tarland (Lucas Kerr)	13.22 "Skin in the Game"	14.01 "The Devil and D.B. Russell"																	The Inferno Killer
Daniel Larson (Eric Roberts)	13.22 "Skin in the Game"	15.18 "The End Game"																	—N/a
Jared Briscoe (Mark-Paul Gosselaar)	15.01 "The CSI Effect"	15.13 "The Greater Good"																	The Gig; Harbor Killer
Paul Winthrop (Mark-Paul Gosselaar)	15.01 "The CSI Effect"	15.18 "The End Game"																	The Gig; Harbor Killer
Dalton Betton (Doug Hutchison)	15.19 "Immortality, Part 1"	15.20 "Immortality, Part 2"																	N/A
