= Gil Grissom =

Fictional character on American television series CSI: Crime Scene Investigation

- CSI: Crime Scene Investigation character
- First appearance: October 6, 2000 (CSI 1x01, "Pilot")
- Last appearance: December 8, 2021 (CSI: Vegas 1x10, "Signed, Sealed, Delivered")
- Portrayed by: William Petersen
- City: Las Vegas; Costa Rica; Paris; Peru

In-universe information
- Occupation: Crime Scene Investigator; University Lecturer; Wildlife Advocate; Entomologist
- Rank: CSI Level III Supervisor; Entomology Specialist; Governmental Consultant; Freelance Consultant
- Duration: 2000–2009, 2011, 2012, 2013, 2015, 2021
- Seasons: 1, 2, 3, 4, 5, 6, 7, 8, 9, 11, 13
- Other appearances: Immortality; Without a Trace (6); CSI: Vegas
- Born: August 17, 1956 (age 70); Santa Monica, California

Gilbert Arthur Grissom (born August 17, 1956), Ph.D. is a fictional character portrayed by William Petersen on the CBS crime drama CSI: Crime Scene Investigation and its sequel, CSI: Vegas. Grissom is a forensic entomologist and for the series' first nine seasons, a CSI Level III Supervisor employed by the Las Vegas Police Department. He appeared in 193 episodes of the original series, where he was succeeded by Raymond Langston (Laurence Fishburne) and later D.B. Russell (Ted Danson). Grissom returned in the sequel series, CSI: Vegas, in 2021.

== Appearances ==
=== Series regular ===
Petersen appeared in every episode of the original series' first eight seasons, with the exceptions of:

Season 5: "Hollywood Brass"
Season 6: "Gum Drops", "The Unusual Suspect"
Season 7: "Sweet Jane", "Redrum"

Petersen then appeared in the first ten episodes of the ninth season, before departing the main cast.

Petersen is part of the main cast for the first season of the sequel, CSI: Vegas.

=== Guest star ===
Following his departure from the main cast, Petersen reprised his role on five occasions.

Voice

Season 09: "Turn, Turn, Turn"
Season 13: "Wild Flowers", "Dead Air"

On screen

Season 11: "The Two Mrs. Grissoms"

Petersen also guest starred in "Immortality," CSI's feature-length series finale.

Petersen also guest stars as Gil Grissom in the TV series Without a Trace in Season 6, episode 6.

== Creation ==
Anthony E. Zuiker, who created the show, loosely based Grissom on real life Las Vegas Metropolitan Police Department criminalist Daniel Holstein. Zuiker was "fascinated" by Holstein, who, like Grissom, kept maggots and pig's blood in his refrigerator. Holstein worked as a consultant for the show. Zuiker originally named the character Gil Sheinbaum, but after he became part of the cast, William Petersen requested the name to be changed. Petersen and Zuiker decided to rename the character "Grissom," after astronaut Gus Grissom, of whom Petersen was a great admirer. The name Gil came from one of the actor's hobbies, fishing.

In 2000, CBS had bought the pilot script from Zuiker, and Nina Tassler, CBS's head of drama development, passed it on to Petersen, who had a pay or play contract with the network. Petersen has said that many TV shows were offered to him over the years, but he "didn't want to get locked down." However, he was impressed with the complexity of Grissom's character and he decided to audition. It was the second time Petersen portrayed a forensic scientist, having portrayed Will Graham in the 1986 film Manhunter.

== Development ==
Gil Grissom first appears in CSI: Crime Scene Investigation in the pilot episode. After this he appeared in almost every single episode of the show's first eight years, except in "Hollywood Brass", from season five, an episode that turns entirely around Jim Brass; besides him, only three other regular characters appear. William Petersen did not appear during the season six episode "Gum Drops." This episode was originally going to be how Grissom was convinced that an abduction victim was still alive. When Petersen's nephew died, he flew home and was unavailable for the filming of the episode, which was rewritten to be centered on Nick. During 2007 (CSI's season seven), William Petersen took a break from CSI to appear in a five-week run of the Trinity Repertory Company production of Dublin Carol in Providence, Rhode Island, resulting in Grissom taking a sabbatical, being replaced by Liev Schreiber, as Michael Keppler, who developed a small story arc through "Sweet Jane", "Redrum", and "Meet Market". Also in 2007, the character appeared in a two-part crossover with another CBS series, Without a Trace. It was the sixth episode of the sixth season, entitled "Where and Why." The plot of the crossover involved a serial killer that had eluded capture in Nevada and had escaped to New York City. Gil Grissom was brought in to assist in the apprehension.

== Character background ==
=== Early life ===
Grissom was born as an only child to a middle-class family in Santa Monica, California. Grissom's father taught botany at a local college and passed his enthusiasm for natural sciences onto his son. His father died when Grissom was nine years old. Grissom recalls the day his father died to Catherine Willows in the episode "Still Life", "He came home from school, one hot humid day, laid down on the couch. I was watching TV, my mom brought in some cold drinks, but she couldn't wake him up. No one would tell me why." Consequently, as a young child, Grissom "played doctor" by performing necropsies on small, deceased animals in the local area.

Gil's mother, Betty, who became deaf as a result of the genetic disorder otosclerosis, was responsible for his love of books. As a result of his mother's deafness, Gil became fluent in American Sign Language in order to be able to communicate with her.

In the earlier seasons of CSI, it becomes clear that Gil is also beginning to lose his hearing as well; eventually he requires surgery to fully restore his hearing.

Grissom earned his Bachelor of Science degree in biology magna cum laude from the University of California, Los Angeles (UCLA), and his Ph.D. in Biology from the University of Chicago. He became a forensic entomologist. In the episode "Grissom vs. the Volcano", Catherine tells the story of losing at a science competition as a child against a "kid with some lame red ants." Later in the episode Nick also reveals that he lost a science competition and Grissom tells him to let it go. In his childhood science competition, Grissom was the kid with the ants.

In the season two episode "Bully for You", he told Warrick that in high school he was a "ghost" (meaning that he did not belong to any group in particular). When he was in college, Grissom financed his first body farm with his winnings from a high-stakes poker game. At the same time, he also attended boxing matches to learn about the patterns of bruise formations on bodies and eventual blood spatters from the injuries.

=== Career ===
Grissom became a crime scene investigator around 1985 (Grissom mentioned in "Living Doll", which first aired on May 17, 2007, that he had been a crime scene investigator for 22 years). Grissom once mentioned losing a body while in Minneapolis, implying he spent time there before taking a job in Las Vegas. This was mentioned again when he works with his former mentor, Dr. Phillip Gerard, played by Raymond J. Barry, stating that he used to work for him in Hennepin County, whose seat is Minneapolis.

He became the night shift team supervisor for the Las Vegas CSI unit on the second episode of the series, after Jim Brass was demoted following the death of co-worker Holly Gribbs. In season seven, Grissom took a sabbatical to teach a class at Williams College in Williamstown, Massachusetts, for four weeks. Prior to his sabbatical, Grissom had been showing signs of "burnout." Upon his return, however, he appeared reinvigorated and told Warrick Brown that he "missed" Las Vegas. After the resignation of Sara Sidle, his fiancée, from the lab, and the murder of Warrick Brown, his burnout seemed to be resurfacing. This is particularly evident in "Say Uncle", where, at the end of the episode, he expressed deep regret over solving a particularly depressing case.

Grissom announced his retirement just as evidence comes to light that the Dick and Jane Killer, a serial killer from the 1990s currently serving two life sentences, did not act alone and that his accomplice had begun killing again. Rather than leave in the middle of a case, Grissom stayed on to help solve it, and ultimately proved instrumental in saving the life of a woman who would have been the killer's latest victim. The case closed, Grissom, having already had a series of one-on-one farewells with his co-workers, silently left the crime lab and departed for Costa Rica for a reunion with fiancée Sara Sidle, an allusion perhaps to his comments in a season one episode that when he left, people would not throw a party for him because he was not the sort of person whom people would get deeply involved with. He also says to Warrick in season two ("Ellie") that when he left there would not be a cake in the break room—he would just pick up and leave.

=== Departure ===
After reuniting with Sara Sidle, Grissom presumably remains in Costa Rica for a short time, before guest-lecturing at the Sorbonne, as noted in the tenth season. During the series' eleventh season, Grissom begins consulting for the Peruvian government on the etymology and physicality of the Inca. It is during this time that Sara and Grissom divorce, citing geographical differences. He later joins a group dedicated to protecting fish and wildlife in the Pacific, a role described as a "CSI at sea." After his activities lead him to the Port of San Diego, Grissom reunites with Willows and the CSI team in order to consult on a series of bombings in Las Vegas. During this case, he reconciles with Sidle, and the two sail off together in order to continue his work as a wildlife advocate.

=== Return ===
Grissom and Sidle both returned in the sequel series CSI: Vegas for the first season with the reveal that they got married off-screen after "Immortality" and have been living on a boat together. Sara would arrive back in Vegas first due to sending Grissom out to collect jellyfish samples.

== Characterization ==
=== Personality ===
Early episodes revealed Grissom to be a witty, enthusiastic, and quirky scientist who had some sense of humor. He flirted regularly and seemed to be constantly in a hyperactive state.

Grissom gives Dr. Phillip Gerard (Raymond J. Barry) his mother's regards in sign language ("The Accused Is Entitled").

However, when he began to lose his hearing, Grissom retreated into himself and became easily irritated and unapproachable. After his surgery, he lightened up a bit but never returned to the whimsical science nerd he once was.

Grissom is often regarded as well-educated but unusual in his approach toward his work and social life. In the series, some of his comments and actions can be seen to dumbfound his coworkers and superiors. His relationship with his subordinates in the office is portrayed as being a father figure to the team, but he is very professional in his work.

Despite being calm, Grissom can get angry when interrupted during an interrogation as seen in the season one episode "Table Stakes", when he berates Nick Stokes for calling him out of an interrogation.

In addition to being a genius and somewhat of a polymath beyond his career training, he exhibits autism-like traits. In "Caged", it is noted that he is in some ways similar to a witness who is autistic. Another character on CSI who shares these kinds of traits is his subordinate (and wife) Sara Sidle. She once insinuated that Grissom was a misanthrope when he quoted her Thoreau's Walden.

In the season two episode "Alter Boys", Grissom confides in a priest that he does not believe in the concept of organized religion and is a lapsed Catholic but does believe in the idea of God. In addition to belief in God, Grissom and Greg would later agree that scientific education should not necessarily preclude belief in occultism and other paranormal concepts.

Although he is very dedicated to his job and sometimes goes to extremes in his investigations, his unwillingness to dabble in office politics often alienates his superiors and sometimes his subordinates. He gets a lot of help in these areas from right-hand woman Catherine Willows, who is always trying to make him "look up from the microscope."

Grissom claims to have never hired a prostitute for sex, stating that sex is intended to create a human emotional connection. He has also expressed distaste for carrying a firearm when in the field, a tendency that has brought several scoldings from coworker Jim Brass. Despite this, he has proven to have exceptional accuracy at the firing range.

He once listed his hobbies to Lady Heather: "I have outlets. I read. I study bugs. I sometimes even ride roller coasters." Indeed, he has proven to be a very cultured man on many occasions, having a wide knowledge of history, literature, and art. He often offers quotes from a variety of literary sources, including Shakespeare and Keats. Later in this same season, he reveals himself to be a baseball fan. Sara notes that this is typical of Grissom, saying that he would like "all those stats." However, Grissom is not too familiar with popular culture. In "Two and a Half Deaths", Jim Brass was talking about a TV program that he thought had already "jumped the shark," but Grissom did not know the term. While trying to explain, Brass says, "Remember the Fonz?" which Grissom did not know either.

Being an entomologist, he has a wide and varied knowledge of insects, which he applies to his investigations. This has led to his nickname, "the Bug Man". At the beginning of the show, he was referred to as "Gruesome Grissom" for his sometimes morbid fascination with the more bizarre aspects of man and nature. Grissom keeps a variety of specimens in his office, including a radiated fetal pig, a tarantula, and a two-headed scorpion. He also has a bulletin board that looks like a fish on which unsolved cases go: "the ones that got away." Occasionally, he keeps evidence from closed cases (such as the models created by "The Miniature Killer"). In season seven, CSI newcomer Michael Keppler takes a look around Grissom's office and observes that he must be quite a freak. In "The Grave Shift", even after his office has been cleared out (and later reclaimed by a somewhat-reluctant Nick Stokes after Catherine Willows passed on the offer), the fetal pig in a jar was placed back in there by Hodges, who stated simply that "[it] belongs here."

When asked why he is a CSI, he responds, "Because the dead can't speak for themselves." This is one of his favorite expressions.

=== Parallels with Sherlock Holmes ===
Gil Grissom has a more than passing similarity to Sherlock Holmes. Like Holmes, Grissom is dispassionate with a fierce devotion to logic and little regard for societal norms of behavior; Grissom once smashed mustard jars in a grocery store to illustrate a theory ("I-15 Murders"), much as Holmes once practiced spearing a pig in a butcher's to determine how strong a man would have to be to transfix a man with a harpoon.

Grissom possesses a Moriarty-like nemesis, Paul Millander, whom he pursues in several episodes ("Pilot", "Anonymous", and "Identity Crisis"). Coincidentally, "Paul Millander" has the same initials as "Professor Moriarty." There's also a woman, Lady Heather, in whom he takes an unusual interest. Their relationship is similar to that of Irene Adler and Holmes. Both Irene and Lady Heather enchant Holmes and Grissom with their beauty, their wit and their resolution. Lady Heather often wears Victorian-style dresses, referencing Holmes's era ("Slaves of Las Vegas", "Lady Heather's Box", "Pirates of the Third Reich", and "The Good, the Bad, and the Dominatrix").

== Relationships with other characters ==
In the sixth-season episode "Bang-Bang", Grissom tells Doc Robbins, concerning a woman shot in the mouth, "This was someone who was emotionally close to her." Doc Robbins asks him if he has ever even been close to getting married. Grissom tells him about "Nicole Daley", who, like him, was interested in bugs. He goes on a bit about her, then says, "Second grade."

Grissom may not ask to take on the role of mentor, but it seems to happen naturally, going all the way back to Sara Sidle when they first met in San Francisco, then Nick Stokes and Greg Sanders in Vegas. Although he can be annoyed with his protégés at times, he is visibly proud when they succeed, as Greg did by passing his field test and becoming a CSI. He is also protective of his staff and defends them as much as he can, as seen in episode 521 ("Rashomama") for example.

He also shares a good friendship with Dr. Al Robbins and the two were seen singing together in the autopsy room while processing the body of a murdered rock 'n' roll star (season 7, "Built to Kill, Part 2"). In the season six finale, it was revealed that Jim Brass's living will gave Grissom power of attorney, showing that Grissom was the one person Brass trusted with his life. He has also been shown to be something of an inadvertent mentor figure to David Hodges, who looks up to him and often seeks his advice or approval, despite not always receiving it. Upon learning of Grissom's plans to quit CSI, Hodges becomes visibly upset.

His relationship with Warrick Brown had aspects of a mentor/student bond, but out of all the CSIs (Catherine included), Grissom seemed to view Warrick as his successor, the one who would lead when he was gone. Grissom found Warrick after he was shot by McKeen and held Warrick as he died in his arms.

Some fans have always expected to see a relationship between Grissom and Catherine Willows, in whom he is shown confiding many times, once even likening her to being his "wife." The two were never more than very good friends, as the show's producers see them as more of brother and sister than lovers. Catherine has many times encouraged Grissom to be more open and less self-absorbed, and to pursue something with Sara Sidle.

Grissom has been allegedly involved with forensic anthropologist Teri Miller and with S&M parlor operator Lady Heather, whose "safeword" it has been suggested that he knows—however, as all he says is "Heather, stop!" and "I'm saying stop," he evidently does not use it, as "stop" is never a safeword. Rather, this is a reference to the episode "Lady Heather's Box", in which she reminds Grissom that the submissive is in control; Grissom tells her when they begin kissing, "You can always say stop," and she replies, "So can you."

=== Sara Sidle ===
Since the first season, there were hints that both Sara Sidle and Grissom were interested in each other romantically. In fact, the show's creators made Sara Sidle while thinking of a future love interest for Grissom, but during the show's first three seasons, Grissom flirted with all the female characters, and when Sara asked him out to dinner, he rejected her, claiming that he did not know what to do about what is going on between them.

A charged moment between Grissom and Sara Sidle

In season four, Grissom's true feelings are revealed in "Butterflied", an episode that centers entirely around him discovering his sentiments for Sara. It was then that he admitted not being able to risk his career to be with her. In season four, Sara apparently develops a drinking problem, which Grissom acknowledges on the season finale; after this, they would hardly see each other.

In mid-season five, Sara is suspended for insubordination and she reveals to Grissom her tormented childhood. He refuses to fire her and has her working in every case of the next two seasons with him.

It was not until the sixth season finale that it is revealed that Grissom and Sara have worked through whatever issues they had, and are, in fact, a couple, and have been for two years. This revelation caused mixed reviews among critics, some of them see this relationship as CSI "jumping the shark," an attempt to include more drama and romance to the show, so as to be able to compete with the medical drama Grey's Anatomy, which aired around the same time. By killing off the sexual tension between the two characters and making them an item, the production crew were seen to be adding more personal drama to the show, increasing the appeal to some of Grey's Anatomy's younger audience. This has been denied by the writers, Carol Mendelsohn even said that she has never been able to see Grissom with someone else other than Sara and that this episode was seen by the writers as the right time to reveal the relationship, Jorja Fox and William Petersen have also admitted that the relationship is not new.

Throughout season seven, the audience sees Grissom and Sara as a couple, but the relationship is kept secret from the others in the lab until Sara's abduction by The Miniature Killer in the season finale when Grissom unwittingly refers to his feelings for Sara. During season eight, they have become engaged. When Jorja Fox decided to leave the show, both she and the writers decided not to kill the character, so as to leave the doors open for a possible comeback. Consequently, Sara Sidle is submerged into depression after her kidnap in the season seven finale, and, even though she accepts Grissom's marriage proposal on the season's fourth episode, she shows signs of burnout during the subsequent episodes, breaking down on the season's seventh episode, leaving Las Vegas and the CSIs with only a goodbye letter for Grissom and a good luck note for Ronnie Lake. In the letter she claims that ever since her father's death she has been dealing with "ghosts" and that she now needs to go away and deal with them before self-destructing.

After Grissom leaves CSI, he goes to Costa Rica, in hopes of finding Sara. Once they see each other, they embrace in a passionate kiss, and Sara's return to CSI in the first episode of season ten reveals that she and Grissom are now married. In "Forget Me Not", Sara reveals "he's not my husband anymore" as she and Grissom had split up. According to her, he was the one to propose an end to the relationship, saying that it was in her best interest. However, in the series finale, Gil and Sara reunite. They sail off together in the final scene of the series.

Six years later they return to Las Vegas (at separate times since Gil was collecting samples in the ocean) after Jim Brass calls them to aid in the case involving his assault by an unnamed man. When asked by CSI Allie Rajan if she regrets retiring, she confirms she doesn't regret it as she wanted to be with Grissom and they had an adventure waiting for them. Gil returns to Vegas by the end of the episode just in time to help on a case involving David Hodges.

== Reception ==
This fictional character has an extensive fan base. There are more than one thousand videos made using the character on sites such as YouTube and a thousand more depicting his relationship with Sara Sidle.

Of more than 25,000 fan fictions written about CSI on FanFiction.Net, more than half include Gil Grissom. There are also many other sites that update daily news about either Gil Grissom's status on CSI or William Petersen's activities in real life.

On September 27, 2007, after CSI's season eight premiered, a miniature model of Gil Grissom's office (which he was seen building during season seven) was put up for auction on eBay. The auction ended on October 7 with the prop being sold for US$15,600, which CBS donated to the National Center on Addiction and Substance Abuse Association.

CSI: Crime Scene Investigation executive producer and showrunner Carol Mendelsohn considers Grissom the center of the show. Grissom has received positive responses from critics, ranking number 82 on Bravo's 100 Greatest TV Characters list, along with Catherine Willows. He was ranked at number 9 on Sleuth Channel's poll of America's Top Sleuths. AOL TV named him one of TV's Smartest Detectives. Grissom's final episode as a regular drew over 23 million viewers.

== Succession ==
- Grissom initially appears as the Grave Shift Assistant Supervisor, a post he holds during "Pilot". He is succeeded by Catherine Willows.
- Grissom is then promoted to Grave Shift Supervisor, replacing Jim Brass. This is a post he holds from "Cool Change" to "One to Go". He is once again succeeded by Willows.
