= CSI: Crime Scene Investigation season 2 =

American TV show season

CSI: Crime Scene Investigation
- Season 2
- Season 2 U.S. DVD cover
- Starring: William Petersen; Marg Helgenberger; Gary Dourdan; George Eads; Jorja Fox; Paul Guilfoyle
- No. of episodes: 23

Release
- Original network: CBS
- Original release: September 27, 2001 – May 16, 2002

Season chronology
- ← Previous; Season 1 Next → Season 3

The second season of CSI: Crime Scene Investigation premiered on CBS on September 27, 2001, and ended May 16, 2002. The series stars William Petersen and Marg Helgenberger.

== Plot ==
The murder of a Police Chief leads Willows and Brown to Miami ("Cross Jurisdictions"), in the second season of CSI. The Las Vegas CSIs investigate another series of gruesome, unprecedented, and unsolvable crimes, including the murder of the son of a Las Vegas mogul ("Burked"), the disappearance of a university student ("Chaos Theory"), the death of a construction worker ("Overload"), the discovery of a decomposed body in a bag ("Bully for You"), a scuba diver discovered up a tree in the desert ("Scuba Doobie-Doo"), a fetish murder ("Slaves of Las Vegas"), and a death at a spa ("Alter Boys"). Meanwhile, Catherine and Sara investigate both a suspected suicide-by-train ("Caged") and a homicide at a remote convenience store ("And Then There Were None"), Warrick is allowed to head the crime lab ("Ellie"), Grissom and Willows come to face to face with a serial killer in a courtroom ("Identity Crisis"), and Nick studies the death of a woman who drowned in the desert ("Anatomy of a Lye"), after finding himself the target of a stalker ("Stalker").

== Cast ==
=== Main cast ===
- William Petersen as CSI Level 3 Night Shift Supervisor Dr. Gil Grissom
- Marg Helgenberger as CSI Level 3 Assistant Night Shift Supervisor Catherine Willows
- Gary Dourdan as CSI Level 3 Warrick Brown
- George Eads as CSI Level 3 Nick Stokes
- Jorja Fox as CSI Level 3 Sara Sidle
- Paul Guilfoyle as LVPD Homicide Unit Captain Jim Brass

=== Recurring cast ===
- Robert David Hall as Clark County Coroner's Office Chief Medical Examiner Dr. Al Robbins
- Eric Szmanda as DNA Technician Greg Sanders
- David Berman as Clark County Coroner's Office Assistant Medical Examiner Dr. David Phillips
- Skip O'Brien as LVPD Homicide Detective Sergeant Ray O'Riley
- Archie Kao as Audiovisual Technician Archie Johnson
- Gerald McCullouch as Ballistics Expert Bobby Dawson
- Geoffrey Rivas as LVPD Homicide Detective Sam Vega
- Eric Stonestreet as Questionable Documents Technician Ronnie Litre
- Joseph Patrick Kelly as LVPD Officer Joe Metcalf
- Jeffrey D. Sams as LVPD Homicide Detective Cyrus Lockwood
- Marc Vann as Day Shift Supervisor Conrad Ecklie
- Christopher Wiehl as Hank Peddigrew
- Nicki Aycox as Ellie Rebecca Brass
- Brigid Brannagh as Tammy Felton
- Melinda Clarke as Dr. Heather Kessler, aka Lady Heather
- Susan Gibney as Fingerprint Technician Charlotte Meridian
- Glenn Morshower as Clark County Sheriff Brian Mobley
- Matt O'Toole as Paul Millander/Judge Douglas Mason
- Sheeri Rappaport as Mandy Webster
- Scott Wilson as Sam Braun
- Mark Sheppard as Rod Darling
- Jeremy Renner as Roger Jennings

=== Crossover stars ===
- David Caruso as MDPD CSI Level 3 Day Shift Supervisor CSI Lieutenant Horatio "H" Caine (Crossing over with CSI: Miami)
- Emily Procter as MDPD CSI Level 3 Detective Calleigh Duquesne (Crossing over with CSI: Miami)
- Adam Rodriguez as MDPD CSI Level 3 Detective Eric Delko (Crossing over with CSI: Miami)
- Khandi Alexander as Miami-Dade County Medical Examiner Alexx Woods (Crossing over with CSI: Miami)
- Rory Cochrane as MDPD CSI Level 3 Detective Tim Speedle (Crossing over with CSI: Miami)

== Episodes ==
No. overall	No. in season	Title	Directed by	Written by	Original release date	Prod. code	US viewers (millions)
24	1	"Burked"	Danny Cannon	Carol Mendelsohn & Anthony E. Zuiker	September 27, 2001	201	22.27
Tony Braun, the son of Las Vegas mogul Sam Braun (Scott Wilson, in his first appearance), is found dead in his home, apparently the victim of a drug overdose. But as the scene lacks all evidence normally connected to an overdose, the team soon suspects murder.
25	2	"Chaos Theory"	Ken Fink	Eli Talbert & Josh Berman	October 4, 2001	202	19.68
The CSI team suspects foul play when university student Paige Rycoff vanishes into thin air. The team soon discovers she had an affair with a married professor, along with some other seemingly unrelated events. When her body is found in a trash heap, the team has to find out what led to her death.
26	3	"Overload"	Richard J. Lewis	Josh Berman	October 11, 2001	203	22.73
When a construction worker takes a fall from the twelfth story at a construction site, Grissom is convinced the victim is electrocuted. But as the Sheriff and many others have no trouble believing it's a suicide and the evidence doesn't immediately support his theory, he experiences much difficulty while trying to prove murder. Meanwhile Nick and Catherine look into the death of a teenage boy who apparently suffered an epileptic seizure during a therapy session.
27	4	"Bully for You"	Thomas J. Wright	Ann Donahue	October 18, 2001	204	23.04
Grissom, Warrick and Catherine investigate when the class clown from a local high school is found dead in the boys' bathroom. They soon discover that there are many suspects, as their victim bullied many of his fellow students. Meanwhile Sara and Nick try to find out the identity and cause of death of a badly decomposed body found in a leather bag.
28	5	"Scuba Doobie-Doo"	Jefrey Levy	Andrew Lipsitz & Elizabeth Devine	October 25, 2001	205	24.67
Grissom, Warrick and Sara are sent to investigate when a former tenant leaves behind a blood-splattered apartment, and a missing girlfriend. Meanwhile, Catherine and Nick are confronted with what seems to be an urban legend turned fact: a scuba diver found in the top of a tree after a forest fire.
29	6	"Alter Boys"	Danny Cannon	Ann Donahue	November 1, 2001	206	23.16
Grissom, Nick and Sara seem to have a clear-cut case when a young man is discovered burying a murder victim in the desert; a priest would later come forward to reveal that he knew the suspects involved. Warrick and Catherine investigate the death of a young woman who died in a hotel spa.
30	7	"Caged"	Richard J. Lewis	Elizabeth Devine & Carol Mendelsohn	November 8, 2001	207	25.10
Grissom and Nick investigate the death of a book restorer who was found dead in a locked library cage. Her autistic co-worker turns out to be a very reliable eyewitness. Meanwhile, Catherine and Sara handle the case of a young woman who was killed when her car was hit by a train, with her pet dog being the only survivor in the car. This is the first appearance of audiovisual expert Archie Johnson (Archie Kao).Gary Dourdan who play's Warrick Brown does not appear in this episode.
31	8	"Slaves of Las Vegas"	Peter Markle	Jerry Stahl	November 15, 2001	208	25.11
A naked young woman is found dead buried in a sandbox at a park playground. The scars and liquid latex on her body lead Grissom, Catherine and Nick to a fetish club, owned by "Lady Heather" (Melinda Clarke, in her first appearance). Sara and Warrick investigate an armed robbery at a cash checking company.
32	9	"And Then There Were None"	John Patterson	Story by : Josh Berman; Teleplay by : Eli Talbert & Carol Mendelsohn	November 22, 2001	209	22.82
Grissom, Nick and Warrick investigate when three men dressed as women rob a casino. Catherine and Sara are sent to investigate a murder of a clerk at a remote convenience store. They soon discover the two cases are related.
33	10	"Ellie"	Charlie Correll	Anthony E. Zuiker	December 6, 2001	210	23.96
When Grissom has to go to a conference, and Catherine is off to Reno, Grissom leaves Warrick in charge of the graveyard shift's investigation of the murder of a con man found dead in a casino parking garage. Things get personal for Brass when he learns his estranged daughter Ellie is one of the suspects. Sara would investigate the couple being conned after discovering that the cash they lost were counterfeit, only to learn that they were the ones who printed the false cash; Sara, however, would end up being "conned" at the end by the Treasury Department. (Nicki Aycox plays Ellie Brass in the character's first appearance.)
34	11	"Organ Grinder"	Allison Liddi	Ann Donahue & Elizabeth Devine	December 13, 2001	211	17.47
A famous real estate entrepreneur is found dead in a hotel elevator. It appears he died from natural causes, but the CSIs suspect he was poisoned. But this turns out hard to prove as organs are donated and the body cremated. (Guest starring Marcia Cross as Mrs Julia Fairmont.)
35	12	"You've Got Male"	Charlie Correll	Marc Dube & Corey Miller	December 20, 2001	212	23.67
Grissom, Sara and Warrick investigate when a young woman is found dead in a pipe at a construction site. Another body, revealed to be the first woman's sister is found nearby, also murdered. A likely suspect is one of the women's Internet relationship, an ex-con. Meanwhile Catherine and Nick look into a hunting mishap, but as their investigation develops, it begins to look less and less like an accident.
36	13	"Identity Crisis"	Kenneth Fink	Anthony E. Zuiker & Ann Donahue	January 17, 2002	213	24.07
Serial killer Paul Millander returns, leaving another staged suicide. Upon finding a clue that connects all the victims, Grissom and Catherine end up in a court room, where the judge bears an uncanny resemblance to Millander. Further investigation reveals a startling secret about Millander's past.
37	14	"The Finger"	Richard J. Lewis	Danny Cannon & Carol Mendelsohn	January 31, 2002	214	23.54
Catherine gets involved in the kidnapping of a real estate developer's mistress. She has to accompany the man while he delivers a million dollar ransom. Meanwhile she tries to leave clues for the other CSIs who are on her trail, including an amputated finger that belonged to the mistress. But when the mistress was found dead, they knew something was up.
38	15	"Burden of Proof"	Kenneth Fink	Ann Donahue	February 7, 2002	215	24.64
When the body of a photographer is dumped at the body farm, Grissom finds out the man was shot to death, but there aren't any bullet fragments in his body. The case gets even more complicated when the CSIs discover the 12-year-old daughter of the photographer's girlfriend was the victim of child abuse. Meanwhile, Sara contemplates leaving the CSI unit, as she felt Grissom was not showing any appreciation towards her.
39	16	"Primum Non Nocere"	Danny Cannon	Andrew Lipsitz	February 28, 2002	216	28.74
Grissom, Sara and Catherine investigate when an ice hockey player dies in a "pileup" in front of a goal during a game. Meanwhile Warrick and Nick investigate the apparent drug-related death of a saxophone player at one of the local casinos. During the case, Warrick finds himself attracted to the singer who worked with the victim.
40	17	"Felonious Monk"	Kenneth Fink	Jerry Stahl	March 7, 2002	217	26.73
Grissom, Sara and Nick investigate the death of four Buddhist monks who were shot to death in their monastery near Vegas. Catherine re-opens the murder of an old friend, when the man that was convicted for the murder claims he is innocent on his deathbed. During the case she finds out some disturbing facts about how her old mentor handled the case.
41	18	"Chasing the Bus"	Richard J. Lewis	Eli Talbert	March 28, 2002	218	25.24
The entire team investigates a bus crash in which nine people lost their lives. Before his death the driver claimed the bus began to vibrate, making it impossible for him to control the bus. The team has to find out whether the accident truly was an accident, or involved foul play. (This was also Sanders' first field assignment, responding to an "all hands on deck" call that he thought included him.)
42	19	"Stalker"	Peter Markle	Anthony E. Zuiker & Danny Cannon	April 4, 2002	219	26.78
A young woman is found murdered in her heavily secured apartment, clearly terrified of someone who was stalking her. The position of her body seems familiar to Nick, and as he and the others piece together the solution, Nick finds himself the stalker's next target when one of the stalker's videos included a newsletter meant for CSI eyes only. In addition, a psychic became involved in the investigation, helping to find clues that would help the case.
43	20	"Cats in the Cradle"	Richard J. Lewis	Kris Dobkin	April 25, 2002	220	23.50
Grissom, Catherine and Warrick investigate the murder of an elderly woman who lived alone with many cats; a couple of kids were found to be the suspects. Meanwhile, Nick and Sara investigate an attempted murder with a pipe bomb placed in a car.
44	21	"Anatomy of a Lye"	Kenneth Fink	Josh Berman & Andrew Lipsitz	May 2, 2002	221	26.17
At a park, a child suffers from first degree burns when he came in contact with dirt laced with a caustic substance. When hazmat revealed a body covered in lye, Grissom and Sara discover the man was the victim of a hit and run by a lawyer with a drinking problem. Meanwhile, Nick investigates the death of a woman who mysteriously drowned in the middle of the desert, miles from a nearest source of water, not realizing that Mother Nature had a role. (Guest starred Zachary Quinto.)
45	22	"Cross Jurisdictions"	Danny Cannon	Anthony E. Zuiker & Ann Donahue & Carol Mendelsohn	May 9, 2002	222	27.12
The former police chief of Las Vegas is found murdered and his seven-year-old daughter is found alive in Miami. Catherine and Warrick then travel to Florida, where they assist the Miami CSIs led by Horatio Caine in hunting down the killer. This was the backdoor pilot for CSI: Miami.
46	23	"The Hunger Artist"	Richard J. Lewis	Jerry Stahl	May 16, 2002	223	26.97
The body of young woman is found in a shopping cart under a freeway overpass, her face horribly disfigured. The team soon discovers the victim was a fashion model and that her homeless sister is a likely suspect. The case would also uncover an ugly side to the fashion model industry. Also: Grissom learns that he has otosclerosis, an abnormal growth in his ears that may affect his hearing.
