= Misconduct in the Las Vegas Metropolitan Police Department =

This list contains incidents of misconduct that have resulted in a conviction, confession, plea bargain or some sort of administrative disciplinary action taken against a member of the Las Vegas Metropolitan Police Department. Excluded are allegations and lawsuits that have not been adjudicated.

== Statistics ==
During the period 1990 to 2011, the Las Vegas Metro Police Department ranked third in the nation in officer-involved shootings per capita, behind Houston and Chicago. The department reported 310 shooting incidents in that period, 115 of them fatal. During this period three officers were killed in the line of duty. Although the local population is less than ten percent Black, about a third of those shot by the police are Black. In twenty-nine percent of the shootings, officers were shot at by suspects.

== 1990s ==
=== 1995 ===
In June 1995, Las Vegas resident (a suspected coin thief) Andrew Dersch was beaten by officers Brian Nicholson, Robert Phelan, and Sergeant James Campbell. After a trial, the officers were convicted, but they were later given a new trial when District Court Judge Lee Gates found that one of the jurors had misrepresented his criminal record during juror selection. In October 1997, Campbell and Nicholson pleaded no contest to the charge of conspiracy to commit assault with a deadly weapon (a gross misdemeanor under Nevada law), while Phelan pleaded guilty to two misdemeanors, obstructing a police officer, and battery. The agreement recommended that they each to serve two years on probation and do 400 hours of community service. The three officers were fired by LVMPD, and in November 1997, Judge Gates disregarded the recommended probation and community service and instead sentenced Campbell and Nicholson to nine months each and Phelan to six months in jail.

=== 1996 ===
LVMPD Officer Michael Ramirez was arrested in October 1996 on charges of sexual assault, open and gross lewdness and oppression after a couple said he forced them to perform sexual acts while he watched after pulling their car over near the Red Rock Canyon National Conservation Area. In March 1998, Ramirez pleaded guilty to two counts of oppression under the color of office. The 30-year-old former officer admitted that he had used his badge, gun and the indirect threat of arrest to force the couple to engage in sex in front of him at an isolated spot about 14 miles west of Las Vegas.

On December 28, 1996, off-duty Officer Ron Mortensen killed Daniel Mendoza in a drive-by shooting. Another Metro officer, Christopher Brady, was driving at the time. Mortensen was sentenced to life in prison without parole as the shooter, while Brady was convicted of federal charges for his role and received a nine-year sentence (in July 2010, the Nevada Supreme Court upheld Mortensen's murder conviction, finding that the murder was premeditated, willful and deliberate")

In April of 2025, Mortensen’s conviction was overturned when an appellate judge ruled the prosecutor in his original case withheld evidence that may have exonerated him as being the shooter. He pleaded guilty in lieu of being re-tried and was released for time served after nearly 30 years in prison.

=== 1997 ===
Officer Art Sewall was arrested on February 8, 1997, and charged with attempted sexual assault and oppression under the color of law, both felonies. Sewall was arrested following an undercover sting at a local motel. The investigation of Sewall was opened following a complaint received on February 6 alleging that Sewall was engaged in criminal conduct. After his arrest, Officer Sewall was placed on paid administrative leave. In March 1997, Sewall resigned from LVMPD and in June 1999 pleaded guilty to two felony counts of oppression under color of office, and charges of kidnapping and sexual assault were dismissed.

In May 1997, cousins Juan Berry and James Suggs were jailed on false charges by four off-duty LVMPD SWAT officers after an altercation at the now-closed Drink! nightclub. In addition, Berry and Suggs said during this time that SWAT officers continually taunted them and yelled at the on-duty officers. They said one SWAT officer called them "niggers" and that another continually made a gesture of pointing as though he had a gun and was pulling the trigger. Three on-duty responding officers later testified that the SWAT officers threatened the cousins. The on-duty police supervisor at the scene testified that he was "embarrassed as a police officer" because of the off-duty SWAT officers' "unprofessional behavior". "They were belligerent. ... They were drunk," Sergeant Steve Custer said. A detective assigned to the case conducted a second investigation which resulted in Berry and Suggs having their names entered into a national law enforcement database, and, after Berry was arrested and jailed for three days and Nevada authorities refused extradition, Berry was released. The police department confirmed that the five officers involved—Bob Rogers, Jerry "Bob" Montes, Mark Mills, Rick Klein and Bob Lewis—remained employed by the department. Lewis received a written reprimand, but it was unclear whether the other officers faced sanctions for their involvement. "Some discipline did come out of this," a department spokesperson said.

== 2000s ==
=== 2001 ===
The family of French citizen Philippe LeMenn, who died while in the Clark County Detention Center in 2001, settled for $500,000 in 2003.

=== 2003 ===
In June 2003, two LVMPD corrections officers, Alan Hirjak, and Christopher Brinkley threw lit firecrackers into inmate areas at the Clark County Detention Center, which prompted a federal lawsuit by four former CCDC inmates against the two officers, and their supervisor, Sergeant P. J. Leeke. The lawsuit was dismissed in 2006 by U.S. District Judge James Mahan, but was re-instated by the U.S. 9th Circuit Court of Appeals in 2008, and at that time, Sergeant Leeke was removed from the lawsuit. The settlement case called for LVMPD to pay $8,000 to the former inmates, and the two corrections officers will pay $7,500 each out of their own pocket. An internal affairs investigation resulted in Hirjak serving a 160-hour suspension without pay, and Brinkley a 120-hour suspension without pay. Then-Sheriff Bill Young described the incident as a "practical joke gone awry". The two officers returned to work after serving their suspensions.

=== 2004 ===
In 2004, Keith Tucker, 47, died after officers responded to a call from his roommate that Tucker was acting erratically. He was handcuffed and on his stomach when officers stunned him with a Taser. LVMPD Sgt. John Sheahan said Tucker died from "positional asphyxia", meaning that Tucker couldn't breathe while being restrained. A medical examiner ruled Tucker died from cardiac arrest during "restraint procedures", which included the use of the stun gun. A coroner's inquest jury ruled the death "excusable". Sheahan said the department won the first trial in Clark County District Court. But the 9th U.S. Circuit Court of Appeals ruled for the plaintiff, and the case was sent back to District Court. On December 12, 2012, the LVMPD Fiscal Affairs Committee recommended a settlement offer of $295,000.

=== 2006 ===
In 2006, Officer Eric Barros was sentenced to three years probation for theft and falsifying evidence during a drug raid. He left the department.

=== 2007 ===
On March 27, 2007, the Las Vegas Review-Journal reported that the Las Vegas Metropolitan Police Department was ordered to pay $1.48 million to settle a federal lawsuit alleging Las Vegas police gave special treatment to an officer's wife who hit and killed a bicyclist in 1994. The settlement ends 13 years of legal fighting that began shortly after Erin DeLew was killed while riding her bike home from a Summerlin supermarket. The driver, Janet Wagner, had been drinking alcohol that evening but was never charged, according to court documents. The lawsuit contended that her husband, Officer David Wagner, and his fellow officers knew she had been drinking but covered it up and delayed calling the Nevada Highway Patrol, which eventually took over the investigation.

In July 2007, Raymond Yeghiazarian was killed in a motor vehicle crash in which LVMPD Officer Jared Wicks was traveling through an intersection between 60 and 75 miles per hour (the posted limit is 45 MPH) while pursuing a white van and not using emergency lights or siren (this according to experts). A Clark County jury in August 2011 awarded a payment of 2.2 million dollars to the relatives of Yeghiazarian, but this amount was reduced to 250,000 dollars by a judge (being that the maximum civil payment allowed under state law). The award was appealed by LVMPD to the Nevada Supreme Court (as of February 2012). The civil attorney for Yeghiazarian has filed a new civil case in US federal court for 7 million in damages (there are no monetary limitations on awards in federal court), and that LVMPD detectives have been biased in their investigation of this traffic crash (note – the jury in the above case did find that Yeghiazarian was at least 25 percent responsible as to the cause of the crash).

=== 2008 ===
LVMPD Officer William Miller was arrested by officers of the Henderson Police Department on charges of domestic violence and coercion in 2008. He was convicted of battery and left LVMPD. Miller was previously involved in a shooting (non-fatal) of a suspected carjacker in July 2004.

=== 2009 ===
Press reports indicate that on May 7, 2009, Officer James Manor was driving his official vehicle at 109 miles per hour when a pick up truck attempted to make a left turn. In the collision with a pickup truck that followed, Officer Manor was killed. Sheriff Doug Gillespie said that Officer Manor and a car driven by another officer had their lights and sirens on as they sped through the intersection. This was later shown not to be the case. The driver of the pickup Calvin Darling was arrested at the scene and charged with driving under the influence of alcohol. Investigation later showed the police car had struck the pickup and that Officer Manor was not wearing his seat belt. After this incident, Calvin Darling's blood alcohol limit was tested at 0.035 and that the Clark County District Attorney's office dropped DUI and failure to yield charges against Mr. Darling when it determined that James Manor was found to be at fault in the crash that ultimately took his own life. On July 26, 2010, the LVMPD Fiscal Affairs Committee approved a $120,000 settlement with Calvin Darling over the four days he spent in jail regarding this incident.

In November 2009, LVMPD Officer Kevin Koval used a lateral-vascular neck restraint (commonly referred to as a choke-hold) to subdue Dustin Boone (who was behaving erratically and had not been taking medication) after entering his home through an unlocked sliding door. The finding of the coroner's inquest found that the death was 'excusable' (which means accidental), and that Sheriff Gillespie had been advised on the manner of entry to the home, and what kind of risk Boone actually posed to the public. On May 23, 2011, the LVMPD fiscal affairs committee approved a $1,000,000 settlement with James, Dorothy, and Michelle Boone (all relatives of Dustin Boone).

LVMPD Lieutenant Benjamin Kim was the target of a corruption investigation by both the FBI and LVMPD with regards to dealings in an ongoing HOA scandal in Southern Nevada. Additionally, his name has surfaced in an ongoing investigation of the Courthouse Cafe, which was located in the Regional Justice Center in Las Vegas, Nevada (it has since closed, and is now a Capriotti's Sandwich Shop). On May 4, 2012, former LVMPD Lt. Benjamin Kim pleaded guilty in federal court to a charge of misprision of felony "for their concealment of an attempt to commit bank fraud", according to court papers filed by federal prosecutors that were unsealed. The guilty plea was in relation to the investigation of the Courthouse Cafe, and is a result of the ongoing HOA investigation in Southern Nevada. On January 28, 2013, federal prosecutors have recommended a 6-month prison sentence for former police lieutenant Benjamin Kim, along with a $5,000 fine and 3 years of supervised release. On February 4, 2013, former LVMPD Lt. Benjamin Kim was sentenced to 3 years of probation by U.S. District Court Judge James Mahan.

== 2010s ==
=== 2010 ===
On June 11, 2010, Detective Bryan Yant, was involved in a controversial fatal shooting of Trevon Cole. He was reassigned to duty as a desk officer following findings that officer Yant had violated several police department policies regarding the preparation and serving of the warrant, in addition to several minor violations. Yant had shot at least three other people in the line of duty up to that point. On January 18, 2012, the family of Trevon Cole (who had been killed by Yant) received a settlement from the LVMPD Fiscal Affairs Committee of 1.7 million dollars (which is the highest amount ever awarded by LVMPD). In addition, it was shown that Bryan Yant made several mistakes when he focused on Trevon Cole and that David Roger (former District Attorney for Clark County, Nevada) and other prosecutors did not believe Bryan Yant's accounting of the shooting.

In July 2010, the LVMPD Fiscal Affairs Committee settled with Calvin Darling, who was initially accused of drunken driving and failure to yield in the death of Officer James Manor for $120,000. The initial reports that Officer Manor had his lights and siren on were incorrect and that Calvin Darling had a blood alcohol level of .035 after being tested (the legal definition for DUI in Nevada is 0.08%). In addition, the Clark County District Attorney office dropped all charges against Darling.

The police union advised its members, starting in 2010, to no longer cooperate with coroner's inquests of police shootings.

=== 2011 ===
On March 20, 2011, LVMPD Officer Derek Colling was involved in the beating and arrest of videographer Mitchell Crooks who Officer Colling approached when he observed Crooks filming a police investigation of a reported burglary. Mitchell Crooks has no criminal record in Nevada and charges of obstructing a police officer, assault/battery on a police officer, and resisting arrest were dismissed by Clark County Justice Court. A claim of excessive force was made to the Internal Affairs Division, and on July 29, 2011, the Las Vegas Review-Journal reported that Officer Colling violated several department policies, and that Mitchell Crook's excessive force complaint was sustained, Deputy Chief Gary Schofield reported. On December 13, 2011, Officer Colling was terminated. The Las Vegas Review-Journal reported on March 26, 2012, that the LVMPD Fiscal Affairs Committee paid Mitchell Crooks the amount of $100,000 in order to settle a federal lawsuit.

On July 8, 2011, the sheriff of the Las Vegas Metropolitan Police Department, Doug Gillespie, along with Assistant Sheriff Ray Flynn, and LVMPD Crime Lab Executive Director Linda Krueger admitted a case of human error involving switched DNA samples by criminalist Terry Cook which had sent an innocent man named Dwayne Jackson to the Nevada State Prison for 4 years. LVMPD's Fiscal Affairs Committee stated that the eventual settlement could reach into the '7-figure' range.

The Las Vegas Sun reported on August 11, 2011, that a federal jury had awarded the sum of 2.1 million (reduced to 1.6 million by a federal judge) to Charles Barnard, a resident of Henderson, Nevada as a result of charges of excessive force by LVMPD Officers Gary Clark, Greg Theobald and Steven Radmanovich.

On December 12, 2011, Officer Jesus Arevalo shot and killed Stanley Gibson in a standoff at an apartment complex. Gibson, a Gulf War veteran had reportedly suffered from psychological distress. He was circling an apartment complex when someone reportedly called in a report of a burglar. The police responded boxing in Gibson's vehicle and ordering him to come out. He did not. Police then planned to extract him from the SUV. The arrival of a senior officer, Lieutenant David Dockendorf, caused some confusion in how to proceed when Gibson gunned his vehicle's engine. In the confusion, Arevalo killed the unarmed man with four shots from an AR-15 assault rifle. In 2013, the agency agreed to pay Gibson's family $1.5 million. The case went through many levels of investigation and disciplinary hearings. Dockendorf was demoted two ranks. Two separate review panels recommended Arevalo be fired. In October 2013, Officer Arevalo became the first policeman in the history of the department to be fired as a result of an on-duty shooting.

=== 2012 ===
LVMPD Officer John Norman was arrested on February 1, 2012, on felony charges of coercion and oppression under the color of office and misdemeanor open or gross lewdness. This was done following separate complaints from two women who Officer Norman had detained and/or arrested during which the women were made to expose their breasts, and that one of the women was groped. Officer Norman was released from the Clark County Detention Center on his own recognizance. The initial investigation of Officer Norman came in late 2011, when he was apprised of the possible charges against him, and at that point refused to cooperate with investigators, and retained attorneys, one of which is former Clark County District Attorney David Roger. Assistant Sheriff Ray Flynn was quoted as saying that the investigation could take months, and that John Norman could lose his job. On February 15, 2012, Assistant Sheriff Ray Flynn reported to the Las Vegas Review-Journal that two more women have come forward with allegations of misconduct on the part of officer John Norman, and that the new incidents of misconduct did not rise to the level of criminal behavior, but could rise to the level of 'conduct unbecoming an officer', and that there are now four internal investigations which are ongoing against Officer Norman. On June 12, 2012, Officer John Norman resigned from employment with the LVMPD, according to Sergeant John Sheahan, who also stated that while John Norman has resigned, the internal affairs investigation, and criminal investigations against him are still on-going. Norman plead guilty to two gross misdemeanors on June 25, 2012, and will be required to register as a sex offender. On January 17, 2013, former LVMPD officer John Norman was sentenced to two (2) years in the Clark County Detention Center (12 months for the count of oppression under the color of office, and 12 months for the count of open and gross lewdness, both of which are gross misdemeanors) and was also required to register as a sex offender. Mr. Norman was given credit for one day served in jail.

In November 2012, Officer Jacquar Roston wounded a man he thought was involved in a domestic disturbance. In fact, the man was just sitting in a car. Nine months later, he was suspended for 40 hours because of his poor judgment.

== 2020s ==
=== 2023 ===
In October 2023, officer Caleb M. Rogers was sentenced to 12 years in federal prison to be followed by three years of supervised release, and ordered to pay $85.000 in restitution, for a series of casino robberies. Between November 2021 and February 2022, Rogers used masks, gloves, and dark clothing, and in the third robbery brandished his LVMPD-issued 9mm caliber firearm, in order to coerce casino staff into giving him the money. In total, Rogers stole $164,000 from the suburban Red Rock and Aliante casinos as well as the Las Vegas Strip-adjacent Rio Hotel and Casino. He was apprehended following a brief chase at the Rio. Surveillance footage clearly identified him through his distinctive gait, caused by a previous injury, as well as his brandishing of a department-issued firearm.

During the trial, the prosecution argued that Rogers' motive for the robberies was to address financial problems due to an alleged gambling addiction. The defense argued that his experience in law enforcement should mitigate his sentence. In the end, Rogers was found guilty of three counts of robbery, one count of brandishing, and the court upheld his sentence citing his position as a police officer and the seriousness of the crimes.
