= Clark County Coroner's Office =

Medical Examiner's Office, Clark County, Nevada, United States of America

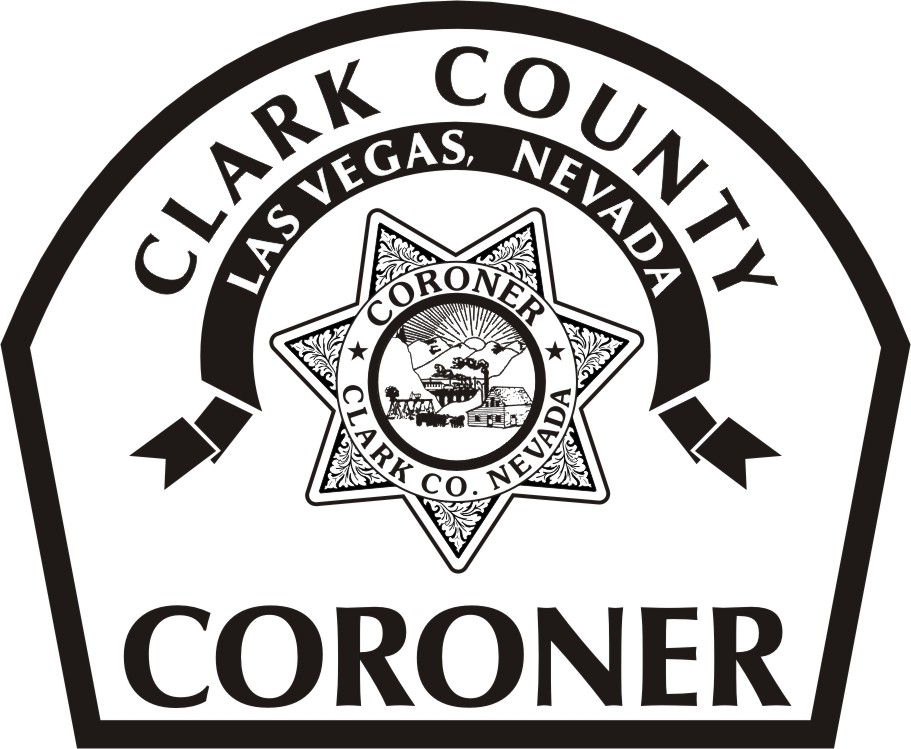

Department overview
- Formed: 1980
- Jurisdiction: Clark County, Nevada
- Headquarters: Las Vegas, Nevada
- Department executives: Melanie Rouse, Coroner; Tami Sedivy-Schroder, Assistant Coroner; Dr.Lisa Gavin, Dr. Nathan Shaller, Dr. Stephanie Yagi, Dr. Stacey Simons, Medical Examiners
- Parent department: Clark County Commission
- Website: Official website

The Clark County Office of the Coroner/Medical Examiner (CCOCME) investigates all deaths caused by any criminal means, violence or suicide, and any unattended death, whatever the cause. The CCOCME provides identification, performs autopsies or medical examinations, locates and notifies next-of-kin, and carries out any other requirements regarding deaths that fall under its jurisdiction.

The Clark County Office of the Coroner/Medical Examiner is the only coroner's office in the United States that is accredited by both the International Association of Coroners and Medical Examiners (IACME) and the National Board of Medical Examiners (NBME).

Melanie Rouse is serving as Clark County Coroner
