= William Petersen =

American actor (born 1953)

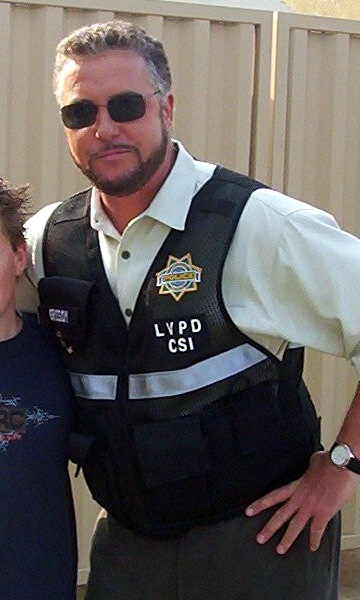
- Petersen on the set of CSI in 2004
- Born: William Louis Petersen; February 21, 1953 (age 73); Evanston, Illinois, U.S.
- Other name: William L. Petersen
- Education: Bishop Kelly High School; Idaho State University
- Occupations: Actor; producer
- Years active: 1976–2024
- Known for: CSI: Crime Scene Investigation
- Spouses: Joanne Brady (m. 1974; div. 1981) Gina Cirone (m. 2003)
- Children: 3

William Louis Petersen (born February 21, 1953) is a retired American actor. He is best known for his role as Gil Grissom in the CBS drama thriller series CSI: Crime Scene Investigation (2000–2015), for which he won a Screen Actors Guild Award and was nominated for a Golden Globe Award; he was further nominated for three Primetime Emmy Awards as a producer of the show. He reprised his role as Gil Grissom in the sequel CSI: Vegas, which premiered on October 6, 2021.

He also starred in the films To Live and Die in L.A. (1985), Manhunter (1986), Young Guns II (1990), Fear (1996), The Contender (2000), Detachment (2011), and Seeking a Friend for the End of the World (2012).

== Early life ==
William Louis Petersen was born on February 21, 1953 in Evanston, Illinois, the youngest of six children of June (née Hoene; 1909–2006) and Arthur Edward Petersen (1907–2004), who worked in the furniture business. Of Danish and German descent, he was raised in the Roman Catholic faith of his mother. He has two brothers, Arthur Jr. and Robert, and three sisters, Anne, Mary Kay, and Elizabeth.

He graduated from Bishop Kelly High School in Boise, Idaho, in 1972. He was accepted to Idaho State University on a football scholarship. While at Idaho State, Petersen took an acting course, which changed the direction of his life.

In 1974 he and his wife Joanne left college and followed a drama professor to the Basque country. There he studied as a Shakespearean actor. Petersen also became interested in Basque culture: He studied the Basque language and gave his daughter the Basque name "Maite Nerea" ("My Beloved"); she was born in Arrasate/Mondragón in 1975.

Petersen returned to Idaho with the intention of being an actor. But not wanting to work a nonacting job there, he returned to the Chicago area, living with relatives. He became active in the theater and earned his Actors' Equity card. He performed with the Steppenwolf Theatre Company, of which he has been an ensemble member since 2008. He was a co-founder of the Remains Theater Ensemble, which also included other prominent Chicago actors Gary Cole and Ted Levine.

== Career ==
Petersen made his film debut with a bit part in Thief (1981), directed by Michael Mann. The actor received his first break when he played a Secret Service agent gone rogue to avenge his mentor in William Friedkin's 1985 action film To Live and Die in L.A. In 1986, he played FBI agent Will Graham in the first Hannibal Lecter film, Manhunter.

Because his role was so emotionally exhausting, he did everything he could to rid himself of Graham after finishing principal photography. He shaved off his beard, cut his hair, and bleached it blond. He also claims to have done this because, while rehearsing for a play in Chicago, he found he was speaking like Graham. He dyed his hair so he could look in the mirror and see a different person.

He declined a part in Oliver Stone's Platoon, as it would have kept him in the Philippines, away from his family. Instead, he worked on the 1987 HBO made-for-TV movie Long Gone as a minor league baseball player and manager named Cecil "Stud" Cantrell. Petersen was offered the role of Henry Hill in the film Goodfellas, but turned it down. An exposé about the film in the May 2015 issue of Playboy claims that Petersen turned down the audition altogether.

In a 1990 ABC three-part miniseries, The Kennedys of Massachusetts, Petersen played U.S. President John F. Kennedy's father, Ambassador Joseph P. Kennedy. The film won an Emmy and a Golden Globe from eight and two nominations, respectively. Also in 1990, Petersen portrayed the infamous Patrick Floyd "Pat" Garrett in Young Guns II.

In 1993, Petersen appeared in a CBS TV miniseries Return to Lonesome Dove, as former Ranger Gideon Walker. He played Steven Walker, a father who stops at nothing to break up the relationship between his daughter and her vicious boyfriend in Fear (1996). Petersen played Governor Jack Hathaway, an unscrupulous candidate for vice president following the death of the incumbent, in The Contender in 2000.

He appeared uncredited in the noir thriller Mulholland Falls as a character who finds himself on the violent receiving end of a Los Angeles police squad's tactics. In 1999, he starred in Kiss the Sky as "Jeff." He appeared as part of an all-star cast in the 1997 remake of 12 Angry Men (as Juror #12, a.k.a. "the Snob").

From 2000 to 2009, he played Dr. Gil Grissom in the CBS crime drama CSI: Crime Scene Investigation. Petersen took a break from CSI in 2006 to appear in a five-week run of the Trinity Repertory Company production of Dublin Carol by Conor McPherson, in Providence, Rhode Island. Petersen renewed his contract with CBS to appear on CSI for the 2008–09 season, reportedly for $600,000 per episode. On July 15, 2008, the Associated Press reported that Petersen was leaving the show as a regular following Season 9's tenth episode, in order to pursue more stage-acting opportunities, but that he might return for guest spots. He remained an executive producer of the show. He reprised his role of Gil Grissom in the eleventh-season episode "The Two Mrs. Grissoms" (aired February 3, 2011). He came back in 2015 as a guest in the series finale, "Immortality."

In February 2020, it was announced that Petersen was returning for a CSI sequel series along with Jorja Fox, before the series was picked up as CSI: Vegas. In October 2025, Petersen stated he was retired from acting and was not seeking any new roles.

== Personal life ==
In 1975, Petersen and his wife Joanne Brady had a daughter, Maite. They later divorced.

In June 2003, Petersen married his longtime girlfriend Gina Cirone. On July 5, 2011, Petersen and Cirone had twins, a daughter and son, via surrogate.

In 2004, he described to Playboy a near-death experience he had in the 1980s which gave him "assurance" that there is an afterlife. In August 2021, he was taken to the hospital via ambulance after feeling unwell on the set of CSI: Vegas. He was experiencing symptoms of exhaustion after 12 weeks of shooting, and was released from the facility soon after.

== Honors ==
On February 3, 2009, Petersen received a star on the Hollywood Walk of Fame.

== Filmography ==
=== As actor ===
==== Film ====
Year	Title	Role	Notes
1981	Thief	Katz & Jammer Bartender	
1985	To Live and Die in L.A	Secret Service Agent Richard Chance	
1986	Manhunter	FBI Agent Will Graham	
1987	Amazing Grace and Chuck	Russell	
1989	Cousins	Tom	
1990	Young Guns II	Pat Garrett	
1992	Hard Promises	Joey	Also producer
1992	Passed Away	Frank Scanlan	
1995	In the Kingdom of the Blind, the Man with One Eye Is King	Tony 'Tony C'	
1996	Fear	Steve Walker	
1996	Mulholland Falls	Jack Flynn, Mobster	Uncredited
1998	Gunshy	Jake Bridges	
1998	Kiss the Sky	Jeff	
2000	The Skulls	Senator Ames Levritt	
2000	The Contender	Jack Hathaway	
2011	Detachment	Sarge	
2012	Seeking a Friend for the End of the World	Glenn	

==== Television ====
Year	Title	Role	Notes
1986	The Twilight Zone	Edward Sayers	Episode: "Need to Know"
1987	Long Gone	Cecil Cantrell	Television film
1990	The Kennedys of Massachusetts	Joseph P. Kennedy	Miniseries
1992	Keep the Change	Joe Starling	Also producer Television film
1993	Return to Lonesome Dove	Gideon Walker	3 episodes
1995	Fallen Angels	George	Episode: "Good Housekeeping"
1996	The Beast	Whip Dalton	Television film
1997	12 Angry Men	Juror #12	Television film
1998	The Staircase	Joad	Television film
1998	The Rat Pack	President John F. Kennedy	Television film
2000–2015	CSI: Crime Scene Investigation	Gil Grissom	Also executive producer Main role (seasons 1–9); Guest role (seasons 11, 13 & 15)
2007	Without a Trace	Gil Grissom	Episode: "Where and Why?"
2013	Blue	Mitch	Episode: "Hard Time"
2015	Manhattan	Colonel Emmett Darrow	10 episodes
2021	CSI: Vegas	Gil Grissom	Also executive producer 10 episodes

==== Video games ====
Year	Title	Role
2003	CSI: Crime Scene Investigation	Gil Grissom
2004	CSI: Crime Scene Investigation - Dark Motives	Gil Grissom
2006	CSI: 3 Dimensions of Murder	Gil Grissom
2007	CSI: Crime Scene Investigation - Hard Evidence	Gil Grissom

== Theatre ==
=== As actor ===
Year	Title	Role	Notes
1976	Darkness at Noon		Jewish Community Theater
1977	Canticle of the Sun		Wisdom Bridge Theatre
1978	Twelfth Night	Sebastian	Illinois Shakespeare Festival
1978	As You Like It		Illinois Shakespeare Festival
1978	Dillinger	John Dillinger	Victory Gardens Theater
1978	Heat		Victory Gardens Theater
1978	Towards the Morning		Victory Gardens Theater
1980	Indulgences in a Louisville Harem		Remains Theatre
1980	Waiting for Godot		Remains Theatre
1980–82	Balm in Gilead	Joe Conroy	Steppenwolf Theatre Company; Remains Theatre
1981	Sixty Six Scenes of Halloween		Remains Theatre
1983	A Class "C" Trial in Yokohama		Remains Theatre
1983	Gardenia		Goodman Theatre
1983–85	In the Belly of the Beast	Jack Henry Abbott	Wisdom Bridge Theatre; Ivanhoe Theatre; John F. Kennedy Center for the Performing Arts; Glasgow, Scotland and London, England, including the American Festival
1984	The Time of Your Life	Joe	Remains Theatre; Goodman Theatre
1984	Fool for Love	Eddie	Steppenwolf Theatre Company
1984	Glengarry Glen Ross	James Lingk	Goodman Theatre
1984	The Tooth of Crime	Hoss	Remains Theatre
1984	Moby Dick	Ahab	Remains Theatre
1984	A Streetcar Named Desire	Stanley Kowalski	Stratford Festival of Canada
1986	Days and Nights Within	Interrogator	Organic Theatre
1986	Mr Puntila and His Man Matti		Organic Theatre
1987	Big Time	Paul	Remains Theatre
1987, 1989	Speed-the-Plow	Bobby Gould	Remains Theatre; Wisdom Bridge Theatre; John F. Kennedy Center for the Performing Arts
1991	American Buffalo	Teach	Remains Theatre
1992	Once in Doubt	Painter	Remains Theatre
1992	The Chicago Conspiracy Trial		Remains Theatre
1994, 1996	The Night of the Iguana	Reverend T. Lawrence Shannon	Goodman Theatre; Criterion Center Stage Right Theatre, Roundabout Theatre Company
1998	Flyovers	Ted	Victory Gardens Theater
2006, 2008	Dublin Carol	John Plunkett	Trinity Repertory Company; Steppenwolf Theatre Company
2009	Blackbird	Ray	Victory Gardens Theater
2010	Endgame	Hamm	Steppenwolf Theatre Company
2013, 2014	Slowgirl	Sterling	Steppenwolf Theatre Company; Geffen Playhouse
2017	The Minutes	Mayor Superba	Steppenwolf Theatre Company

=== As director ===
- Farmyard, Remains Theatre, 1982
- Traps, Remains Theatre, 1983

== Accolades ==
Association	Year	Accolade	Nominated work	Results	Ref
Golden Globes	2004	Best Actor — Television Series, Drama	CSI: Crime Scene Investigation	Nominated	
Insect Fear Film Festival	2005	Image Award	CSI: Crime Scene Investigation	Won	
Primetime Emmy Awards	2002	Outstanding Drama Series (executive producer)	CSI: Crime Scene Investigation	Nominated	
Primetime Emmy Awards	2003	Outstanding Drama Series (executive producer)	CSI: Crime Scene Investigation	Nominated	
Primetime Emmy Awards	2004	Outstanding Drama Series (executive producer)	CSI: Crime Scene Investigation	Nominated	
Producers Guild of America	2003	Outstanding Producer of Episodic Television, Drama	CSI: Crime Scene Investigation	Nominated	
Producers Guild of America	2004	Outstanding Producer of Episodic Television, Drama	CSI: Crime Scene Investigation	Nominated	
Producers Guild of America	2005	Outstanding Producer of Episodic Television, Drama	CSI: Crime Scene Investigation	Nominated	
Screen Actors Guild Awards	2002	Outstanding Performance by an Ensemble in a Drama Series	CSI: Crime Scene Investigation	Nominated	
Screen Actors Guild Awards	2003	Outstanding Performance by an Ensemble in a Drama Series	CSI: Crime Scene Investigation	Nominated	
Screen Actors Guild Awards	2004	Outstanding Performance by an Ensemble in a Drama Series	CSI: Crime Scene Investigation	Nominated	
Screen Actors Guild Awards	2005	Outstanding Performance by an Ensemble in a Drama Series	CSI: Crime Scene Investigation	Won	

== See also ==
- List of stars on the Hollywood Walk of Fame
