= CSI: Crime Scene Investigation season 15 =

American TV show season

CSI: Crime Scene Investigation
- Season 15
- Season 15 U.S. DVD cover
- Starring: Ted Danson; Elisabeth Shue; George Eads; Jorja Fox; Eric Szmanda; Robert David Hall; Wallace Langham; David Berman; Elisabeth Harnois; Jon Wellner
- No. of episodes: 18

Release
- Original network: CBS
- Original release: September 28, 2014 – February 15, 2015

Season chronology
- ← Previous; Season 14 Next → Immortality

The fifteenth and final season of CSI: Crime Scene Investigation premiered on CBS on September 28, 2014, and ended on February 15, 2015. The season stars Ted Danson and Elisabeth Shue.

== Plot ==
Finlay finds her car rigged to explode ("The CSI Effect") as Sara and Greg are quarantined ("Bad Blood") in the fifteenth and final season of CSI.

As Russell and Finn are forced to embark on a hunt for the elusive Gig Harbor Killer, their team investigates a final series of gruesome and unusual cases, including a fatal shooting at a marijuana store ("Buzz Kill"), a chemistry experiment gone awry ("The Book of Shadows"), a death at a rehab ("Road to Recovery"), the world of rubber dolls ("Rubbery Homicide"), a murder at a jail ("Let's Make a Deal"), a victim who died twice ("Dead Rails"), and a case that leads the team into the world of aeronautics ("Angle of Attack").

Meanwhile, Morgan, Sara and Finn are met with a shootout at a forensics conference ("Girls Gone Wilder"), D.B. turns to Avery Ryan for advice on the psychology of killers ("The Twin Paradox"), and the CSIs reopen a ten-year-old investigation ("Dead Woods").

Also this season, a chrome-covered victim perplexes the investigators ("The Last Ride"), the abduction of two teenagers leads to a surprising offer for Nick ("Under My Skin"), murder memorabilia brings back bad memories of the team ("Merchants of Menace"), Stokes leaves Las Vegas, and Finlay is left comatose after coming face to face with the Gig Harbor Killer ("The End Game").

== Cast ==
=== Main ===
- Ted Danson as D.B. Russell, a CSI Level 3 Supervisor and the Lab Director
- Elisabeth Shue as Julie Finlay, a CSI Level 3 Assistant Supervisor
- George Eads as Nick Stokes, a CSI Level 3
- Jorja Fox as Sara Sidle, a CSI Level 3
- Eric Szmanda as Greg Sanders, a CSI Level 3
- Robert David Hall as Al Robbins, the Chief Medical Examiner
- Wallace Langham as David Hodges, a Trace Technician
- David Berman as David Phillips, an Assistant Medical Examiner
- Elisabeth Harnois as Morgan Brody, a CSI Level 3
- Jon Wellner as Henry Andrews, a DNA and Toxicology Technician

=== Recurring ===
- Alimi Ballard as Kevin Crawford (episodes 2, 3, 4, 10, 11, 13, 16)
- Larry M. Mitchell as Officer Mitchell (episodes 3, 4, 8, 14, 15, 17, 18)
- Marc Vann as Conrad Ecklie (episodes 1, 5, 17, 18)
- Mark Valley as Daniel Shaw (episodes 1, 6, 13, 18)
- Mark-Paul Gosselaar as Jared Briscoe and Paul Winthrop (episodes 1, 6, 13, 18)

=== Guest stars ===
- Floriana Lima as Keri Torres (episode 6)
- Patricia Arquette as Avery Ryan (episode 6)
- Sharon Osbourne as Elise Massey (episode 10)
- Lisa Rinna as Tori Nolan (episode 17)
- Brett Cullen as John Nolan (episode 17)

=== Changes ===
George Eads departed the main cast at the end of this season, and later confirmed that he would not return for the series-ending movie, resulting in some minor changes to the script. Elisabeth Shue would not return either. Patricia Arquette guest stars as Avery Ryan.

== Production ==
In June 2014, it was announced that showrunner Carol Mendelsohn would be leaving the show after 14 years. Speaking to The Hollywood Reporter, Mendelsohn stated, "It's been a long and amazing journey, and I am so proud of CSI's continued success. In handing over the helm to my dear friend and partner, Don McGill, I know he and our CSI team will carry on brilliantly what we've all created together. CSI, its cast and crew, writers and directors, will always be my family. I have learned so much from each and every one of them. About writing, producing and life. For that, and so much more, I am forever grateful." Don McGill became the lone showrunner for season fifteen. Starting with this season, the show moved to Sundays at 10:00p.m, except for episode 16, which had a special Tuesday at 10:00 p.m. airing on January 27, 2015.

== Episodes ==
No. overall	No. in season	Title	Directed by	Written by	Original release date	US viewers (millions)
318	1	"The CSI Effect"	Alec Smight	Christopher Barbour & Don McGill	September 28, 2014	9.36
The CSIs investigate a crime scene that was already prepared for them; Russell believed that the scene looked very similar to that by the "Gig Harbor Killer" Jared Briscoe. However, Briscoe is in prison in Washington state, awaiting execution. Russell believed that it may be a copycat crime committed by Briscoe's twin brother, real estate tycoon Paul Winthrop (also Mark-Paul Gosselaar). But the CSIs arrive at a dead end when they could not find any tangible evidence. The case made a drastic turn when Finley found herself trapped in her car, rigged with a bomb set to explode in 30 minutes - or earlier. The perpetrator called Russell, saying that he will turn off the bomb if he can answer one simple question: "Who am I?" Cast : Mark-Paul Gosselaar as Jared Briscoe
319	2	"Buzz Kill"	Frank Waldeck	Andrew Dettmann	October 5, 2014	8.04
A woman enters a marijuana dispensary, informing its owner that kidnappers are holding his family hostage, and demand $300,000 ransom if he wants them back alive. However, the situation turned dire when the shop's security guard shot her dead. The situation is made even more difficult when the CSIs found that she had no identifying features - not even fingerprints.
320	3	"Bad Blood"	Louis Shaw Milito	Tom Mularz	October 12, 2014	8.77
Sara and Greg investigate a shooting of a former biological pathogen specialist, but found themselves in quarantine after discovering that the dead man contracted a hemorrhagic fever. The other CSIs rush to find his assassin, who may also have the same disease, before it spreads.
321	4	"The Book of Shadows"	Brad Tanenbaum	Gavin Harris	October 19, 2014	8.85
A teenager, recording at his high school for his vlog, caught an explosion at the chem lab that had taken the life of the chemistry teacher. The CSIs would later discover that not only the chem teacher was part of a witchcraft circle, but that he was not the target, and that the explosion was not the cause of his death.
322	5	"Girls Gone Wilder"	Frank Waldeck	Melissa R. Byer & Treena Hancock	November 9, 2014 (Note: This episode was originally broadcast in Canada on CTV on October 26, 2014. The episode was preempted in favor of football games by CBS on October 26 and November 2, 2014.)	8.67
Morgan, Sara, and Finlay attend a forensics conference at the Mediterranean when a mass shooting occurs, taking the lives of five attendees at a seminar that Morgan and Sara were attending. Finley and an old friend of hers from Seattle, who were in an elevator, nearly missed the assassin, but not without her friend being shot; it would become a special matter of life or death when the elevator they were on broke down. Meanwhile, the others investigate a case of a body found dissolved in a steel drum, which would be connected to the shooting. Later, they discovered a second shooter at the hotel, who was working independently from the first shooter on his own grudges.
323	6	"The Twin Paradox"	Phil Conserva	Christopher Barbour	November 16, 2014	8.45
The CSIs respond to a 911 call while a murder was still in progress, only to discover the crime scene had already been worked and the 911 call having been faked; looking back at a similar scene in The CSI Effect, they are determined that the Gig Harbor Killer was still at large. Furthermore, the killer left a hidden message for the CSIs at the scene: "People lie - follow the evidence." Meanwhile, Jared Briscoe is undergoing psychiatric evaluation to determine whether or not he's innocent of his crimes, while Finley is in Seattle to research more on his relation between him and Paul Winthrop, leading to a convent where they discovered that Paul "died" at birth, only to find an old baby doll, a picture of what could be their birth mother, and a bit of hair in its grave. Cast : Patricia Arquette as Avery Ryan.
324	7	"Road to Recovery"	Alec Smight	Andrew Dettmann	November 23, 2014	7.88
A woman, who became grossly intoxicated by drugs and alcohol after a night of partying at numerous clubs, was found dead in a swimming pool. The CSIs would find out that she was a patient at a rehab clinic with a liberal curfew and little restrictions, and that she didn't die of drowning in the pool, but of murder at the clinic.
325	8	"Rubbery Homicide"	Louis Shaw Milito	Tom Mularz	November 30, 2014	8.30
Russell and Sara investigate the death of a man with multiple stab wounds in a back alley, wearing nothing but his boxer shorts. The next day in a nearby dumpster, Nick and Officer Mitchell discover a rubber suit of a woman, with stab wounds matching the victim's. This would lead the CSIs into the kinky world of "rubber dolls", and into a connection with a deceased fashion model, whose likeness was used in making the rubber suit the victim wore.
326	9	"Let's Make a Deal"	Brad Tanenbaum	Elizabeth Devine	December 7, 2014	7.89
A mentally ill inmate at the Clark County Jail, running away from officers administering flu shots due to his aversion to needles, created a melee as he ran away from the officers. However, soon after entering the laundry, he discovered a dead body in the closet. With "one victim and two thousand suspects," the CSIs investigate, only to find themselves in an impasse with the FBI, who had the victim as a confidential informant in a case involving a crooked prison guard, with the FBI refusing to share any details with the LVPD.
327	10	"Dead Rails"	Frank Waldeck	Gavin Harris	December 14, 2014	7.18
A man, who was buried alive and left for dead in the desert, dug himself out and flagged down a passing car, only to get struck and killed by that car. The CSIs would later trace him to an upscale billiards hall, which doubled as an illegal brothel. Cast : Sharon Osbourne
328	11	"Angle of Attack"	Kevin Bray	M. Scott Veach	December 21, 2014	7.34
The CSIs discover an accountant on the street with numerous shards of thick glass in his body, determining that he "jumped" from an office building a block away; examination of his office revealed two broken windows and a "skid mark" on a desk. Soon after, they examine a burned up taxi cab with only a victim's limbs and its helmet inside. These incidents would lead to a project by a defense contractor to test and manufacture jet suits for the United States Air Force, under supervision of a manager who encourages her workers to work extra hours - and put their lives on the line - to improve on the apparatus. The CSIs would find out the real reason why the manager would overwork her co-workers.
329	12	"Dead Woods"	Phil Conserva	Treena Hancock & Melissa R. Byer	December 28, 2014	7.84
A teenage girl and her boyfriend, who were in The Alphabets to score some drugs for himself, found themselves mugged by a homeless man; a struggle between the boyfriend and the bum would leave the bum dead of a gunshot wound; however, the smell of the gun's fumes would stir back memories from ten years earlier, when her entire family was killed by what was determined to be her father, who later shot himself as a "suicide". She would encourage Sara, who had worked on the original case, to reopen it to determine if her accused father was innocent. This would also stir back Sara's own memories of family life many years back, when her father was killed by her mother in an alcohol-driven rage.
330	13	"The Greater Good"	Alec Smight	Christopher Barbour	January 4, 2015	8.62
Paul Winthrop announced that his brother, the 'Gig Harbor Killer' Jared Briscoe, has been exonerated due to a lack of evidence, and vows to bring justice to those who convicted Briscoe. Russell arranged for safe passage of his daughter back to Seattle, but one of the twins' accomplices, Seattle detective Daniel Shaw, was eavesdropping, Research would show that Shaw was blackmailed in order to save his own daughter, as Winthrop had a connection with an escort service, of whom Shaw was a customer. Briscoe would die in the melee, but Winthrop would escape undetected. Cast : Mark Valley as Daniel Shaw
331	14	"Merchants of Menace"	Claudia Yarmy	Tom Mularz	January 25, 2015	8.25
At a "murderabilia" convention, which featured the sale of items connected to notorious murders (including past CSI adversaries "The Blue Paint Killer" Kevin Greer and the "Dick and Jane Killer" Nate Haskell), a man was found stabbed in an automobile that belonged to "The Sin City Slasher", Lucas Reem, who was executed a couple of years earlier. His autopsy would later reveal that the victim was killed with a knife crafted out of one of Reem's bones. The husband of one of Reem's victims, who was trying to purchase the knives and other memorabilia with the intent to destroy them, was also found dead later. The CSIs would go into the dark web "blood market" to follow the evidence to determine who made the knives and committed the murders. Cast : Greg Evigan
332	15	"Hero to Zero"	Phil Conserva	Andrew Dettmann	January 25, 2015	8.30
A "superhero", who came to the aid of a homeless person being harassed in a dark alley, was later found dead. The CSIs would discover that he was acting out his fantasy after discovering drawings of his superhero in action, and that he had friends who also pose as superheroes. Investigation would find out that the "gang" was also an act, designed to "defeat" the superhero.
333	16	"The Last Ride"	Tim Beavers	Gavin Harris	January 27, 2015	10.38
The CSIs discover a body of a young woman dumped in the desert, covered with chrome, and with bruising from an automobile resembling a 1938 Packard. The trail would lead to the collection of an investment banker, who was in the midst of a feud with his artist brother over rights to an automobile collection owned by their father, mobster Alphonse DeRosa. The investigation would lead to another automobile, a 1976 Cadillac, where their father and his girlfriend was shot and killed in the 1980s in what was perceived as a mob hit - that car, which included some of the evidence from the chrome murder, was discovered to be stolen.
334	17	"Under My Skin"	Alrick Riley	Melissa R. Byer & Treena Hancock	February 15, 2015	7.12
Two teenage girls, daughters of a San Diego coroner, were in Las Vegas on a shopping and flirting spree on his stolen credit card, when they gained the attention of two men. After one of the men was found to be murdered in a public restroom, the CSIs' investigation would lead to a sex trade ring. One of the girls would later be found to be dead; Nick and his crew would race against time to find the other; a significant clue being a deathstalker scorpion, a species found only in the Middle East known for its deadly venom which could have killed one of the victims. Later, their father would offer Nick a position as lead CSI in San Diego, though Nick has qualms of taking up on the position, as his roots were with the LVPD.
335	18	"The End Game"	Alec Smight	Christopher Barbour	February 15, 2015	7.12
Paul Winthrop reinvents himself to take on the identity of his now-deceased brother, Jared Briscoe. In doing so, he sent Finley a little gift: a statue of Castor and Pollux (which included blood evidence), and Paul's severed finger. They would soon discover the bodies of twin sisters, who before their deaths would tattoo Jared's designs onto Paul. With the help of Detective Shaw, he and Finley would trace Paul's whereabouts to San Diego, where his father, Collin Winthrop lives as a greenhouse gardener; an ambush would later take the lives of Collin and Detective Shaw, who would save Finley's life. Later in Las Vegas, Russell would find himself face-to-face with Paul Winthrop in Finley's condo, in which he told Russell that he killed her, but won't say where, other than the "desert"; she would later be found in the trunk of Paul's car, barely alive. Later, Nick decides to take the lead CSI job in San Diego, after encouragement from Russell and, in spirit, Finley, who was recovering but in a coma. Cast : Barry Bostwick as Collin Winthrop and Eric Roberts, reprising his role as Brother Daniel Larson.

== Ratings ==
No.	Title	Air date	18-49 Rating/Share	Viewers (in millions)	Rank (week)
1	The CSI Effect	September 28, 2014	1.3/4	9.36	25+
2	Buzz Kill	October 5, 2014	1.3/4	8.04	25+
3	Bad Blood	October 12, 2014	1.4/4	8.77	25+
4	The Book of Shadows	October 19, 2014	1.4/3	8.85	25+
5	Girls Gone Wilder	November 9, 2014	1.2/4	8.67	25+
6	The Twin Paradox	November 16, 2014	1.3/4	8.45	25+
7	Road to Recovery	November 23, 2014	1.3/4	7.88	25+
8	Rubbery Homicide	November 30, 2014	1.4/4	8.30	21
9	Let's Make a Deal	December 7, 2014	1.2/4	7.89	21
10	Dead Rails	December 14, 2014	1.2/4	7.18	25+
11	Angle of Attack	December 21, 2014	1.3/5	7.34	22
12	Dead Woods	December 28, 2014	1.4/5	7.84	11
13	The Greater Good	January 4, 2015	1.3/4	8.62	10
14	Merchants of Menace	January 25, 2015	1.2/3	8.25	20
15	Hero to Zero	January 25, 2015	1.3/4	8.30	18
16	The Last Ride	January 27, 2015	1.6/5	10.38	15
17	Under My Skin	February 15, 2015	1.1/3	7.12	25+
18	The End Game	February 15, 2015	1.1/3	7.12	25+

== Broadcast ==
The season airs simultaneously on CTV in Canada. It premiered on Channel 5 in the United Kingdom on January 24, 2015.
