= CSI: Crime Scene Investigation season 13 =

American TV show season

CSI: Crime Scene Investigation
- Season 13
- Season 13 U.S. DVD cover
- Starring: Ted Danson; Elisabeth Shue; George Eads; Jorja Fox; Eric Szmanda; Robert David Hall; Wallace Langham; David Berman; Elisabeth Harnois; Jon Wellner; Paul Guilfoyle
- No. of episodes: 22

Release
- Original network: CBS
- Original release: September 26, 2012 – May 15, 2013

Season chronology
- ← Previous; Season 12 Next → Season 14

The thirteenth season of CSI: Crime Scene Investigation premiered on September 26, 2012, on CBS, and ended on May 15, 2013. It stars Ted Danson and Elisabeth Shue.

== Plot ==
D.B. and Finn hunt for missing Kaitlyn, while Sara convinces Nick to return to the Las Vegas Crime Lab ("Karma to Burn"), in the thirteenth season of CSI. Russell, Finlay and their team are met with the gruesome, the brutal, and the unusual, including a shootout at the CSI's favorite diner ("Code Blue Plate Special"), the murder of a runaway sex slave ("Wild Flowers"), a body in a piano ("It Was a Very Good Year"), the death of a police dog handler ("Play Dead"), the discovery of a mass grave ("CSI on Fire"), a plane crash ("Risky Business Class"), a news anchor killed on live TV ("Dead Air"), the murder of a tennis star ("Double Fault"), the murder of a Cuban singing sensation ("Exile"), a cheating scandal at a poker tournament ("Last Woman Standing"), a body near a forest reserve ("Sheltered"), a ghost hunter's murder (Ghosts of the Past) a sole witness in the form of a 6-year-old girl ("Backfire") and a body in a mud-bath ("Fearless"). Meanwhile, things get personal, as Russell's sons coach is murdered ("Pick and Roll"), a body is found on Warrick's grave ("Fallen Angels"), Brass learns more about Ellie ("Strip Maul"), NYPD Lab Director Mac Taylor heads to Las Vegas ("In Vino Veritas"), Sara became a suspect in a homicide ("Forget Me Not"). Phillips heads to a high school reunion ("Dead of the Class"), and an investigation into a series of Dante's Inferno killings bring the CSIs face-to-face with Black Sabbath ("Skin in the Game"), before jeopardizing the life of one investigator.

== Cast ==
=== Main ===
- Ted Danson as D.B. Russell, a CSI Level 3 Supervisor and the Lab Director
- Elisabeth Shue as Julie Finlay, a CSI Level 3 Assistant Supervisor
- George Eads as Nick Stokes, a CSI Level 3
- Jorja Fox as Sara Sidle, a CSI Level 3
- Eric Szmanda as Greg Sanders, a CSI Level 3
- Robert David Hall as Al Robbins, the Chief Medical Examiner
- Wallace Langham as David Hodges, a Trace Technician
- David Berman as David Phillips, an Assistant Medical Examiner
- Elisabeth Harnois as Morgan Brody, a CSI Level 3
- Jon Wellner as Henry Andrews, a DNA and Toxicology Technician
- Paul Guilfoyle as Jim Brass, a Homicide Detective Captain

=== Recurring ===
- Marc Vann as Conrad Ecklie (episodes 1, 2, 14, 16, 22)
- Alex Carter as Lou Vartann (episodes 11)
- Larry M. Mitchell as Officer Mitchell (episodes 1, 2, 5, 7, 8, 12, 14, 16, 17, 19–21)

=== Guest stars ===
- William Petersen as Gil Grissom (voice only in episodes 3 & 11)
- Gary Sinise as Mac Taylor (episode 13)
- Catrinel Marlon as Elisabetta, Hodges Fiancé ( Episodes 13 and 20)

== Production ==
In episode thirteen of the season, CSI staged a two-part crossover with its spin-off show CSI: NY in which Gary Sinise marked his first appearance in CSI and as his CSI: NY character Mac Taylor; cast member Ted Danson subsequently appeared in the CSI: NY portion of the story. Former cast member William Petersen also returned as Gil Grissom for voice overs in the episodes "Wild Flowers" and "Dead Air", on the phone with Sara; these appearances were uncredited. On March 20, 2013, CBS renewed CSI for a fourteenth season, which aired in September 2013.

== Episodes ==
No. overall	No. in season	Title	Directed by	Written by	Original release date	US viewers (millions)
274	1	"Karma to Burn"	Alec Smight	Story by : Christopher Barbour; Teleplay by : Christopher Barbour & Don McGill	September 26, 2012	10.76
Finley befriends a young cop thought to be one of Jeffrey McKeen's henchmen, in the hopes of identifying where he is holding Russell's kidnapped granddaughter. Russell and the rest of the CSI team go on an all-out hunt to find them before time runs out. Meanwhile, Nick Stokes, soused after downing a few beers, is literally dragged back into CSI by Sara Sidle. Morgan finds herself drawn closer to Hodges as she awaits news about her father who was shot during last season's finale, and Russell contemplates taking drastic action against McKeen in order to draw information from him.
275	2	"Code Blue Plate Special"	Louis Shaw Milito	Andrew Dettmann	October 10, 2012	10.70
As the CSIs roll in to take a meal break at their favorite local diner, they discover eight dead bodies and the owner locked in the fridge. A known stalker who has been harassing one of the victims immediately becomes their prime suspect, until an interruption from Witness Protection complicates the case, and leads them to suspect that someone close to the diner is not as innocent as they may appear. Meanwhile, things get extremely personal for Sara as she clashed with the stalker Ronald Basderic years ago.
276	3	"Wild Flowers"	Brad Tanenbaum	Joe Pokaski	October 17, 2012	10.63
A runaway sex slave is murdered during a rave in the desert and the CSIs are faced with hundreds of witnesses who saw nothing. The discovery of another runaway reveals the brutal torture she and the deceased girl suffered. When she finds out that the victim's tongue was cut out, Morgan decides to take the case into her own hands. This episode features a voice cameo when Sara calls Grissom, but only gets his voice mail.
277	4	"It Was a Very Good Year"	Frank Waldeck	Gavin Harris	October 24, 2012	9.95
Brass and the CSIs examine an abandoned grand piano in the desert, which includes a dead woman inside. Greg recognizes her as a journalist who helped him on his book on Las Vegas history a while back. The case connects to a cold case from the 1960s of a lounge pianist who had incriminating information on Sam Braun and his organization.
278	5	"Play Dead"	Eagle Egilsson	Treena Hancock & Melissa R. Byer	October 31, 2012	10.91
When a police dog handler is murdered, his canine partner becomes the prime suspect. Nick becomes personally involved in the case, but can he, along with the rest of the team, prove the dog innocent before it is put down and bring the real culprit to justice? Meanwhile, Finlay and Morgan investigate the death of a high-profile divorce lawyer with an abundance of enemies.
279	6	"Pick and Roll"	Alec Smight	Rick Eid	November 7, 2012	10.33
Things get personal for D.B. Russell when he investigates the death of his son's basketball coach - with his son being one of the suspects, and his son's girlfriend as part of a love triangle that included his coach. A second murder involving one of the team's significant donors complicate the case, and the school president Rob Austin (Note: Michael Gross as Rob Austin) is called into question. Russell fights to keep his family, and his emotions, together.
280	7	"Fallen Angels"	Louis Shaw Milito	Tom Mularz	November 14, 2012	11.01
The murder of a pastor at the burial site of the late CSI Warrick Brown results in the hunt for an insane man who lost his family years ago. The case hits too close to Nick Stokes, Sara Sidle, Greg Sanders and Jim Brass who start remembering Warrick. Further complicating the case is Warrick's ex-wife, who refuses to cooperate with the CSIs, despite living with the prime suspect and putting the life of her son in danger.
281	8	"CSI on Fire"	Jeffrey Hunt	Story by : Carol Mendelsohn & Richard Catalani; Teleplay by : Thomas Hoppe	November 21, 2012	10.77
When Finlay discovers a unique necklace at a mass grave near a meteorite crash, the investigation becomes personal for her, when the necklace leads to one of the victims being identified as a missing person who she investigated during her tenure in Seattle. However, Finlay's personal involvement with the case is called into question when she disobeys D.B. Russell's orders and travels to Seattle, but it is not long before she finds herself implicated in the investigation when a further body is found.
282	9	"Strip Maul"	Alec Smight	Christopher Barbour	November 28, 2012	12.11
The CSIs lend a hand to local law enforcement on Fremont Street, but while arresting an assortment of criminals, Nick discovers a murdered man in a parked car, and the possible connection with some of the people they arrested. Meanwhile, things get personal for Brass as he learns some disturbing facts about his daughter Ellie, after discovering that one of the prostitutes they arrested had the wedding ring that belonged to his ex-wife. Also, Ecklie returns to work, and receives word that Sheriff Liston wants him to succeed her as Sheriff. This episode markes the first appearance of Kevin Crawford, (Note: Alimi Ballard as Kevin Crawford) an officer who was promoted to detective.
283	10	"Risky Business Class"	Frank Waldeck	Elizabeth Devine	December 12, 2012	9.59
The CSI team is called to investigate when a plane crashes just off the Vegas strip. Genealogist Donna Hoppe (who first appeared the previous season in Genetic Disorder) returns to help Morgan with something regarding the Ecklie family as a gift for her dad, but provides crucial information to the CSIs when they discover a box amongst the plane's wreckage that included a DNA sample. Also, the appearance of Sara's former love interest, working for the NTSB, puts a strain on her long-distance relationship with Gil Grissom.
284	11	"Dead Air"	Phil Conserva	Joe Pokaski	January 16, 2013	11.14
During a thunderstorm, a TV news anchor is killed during a live broadcast when a power blackout affects the studio; the CSIs work the scene, but soon find themselves part of the story when it is covered by the station's competitors. Meanwhile, the reappearance of Sara's former love in the last episode leads to her to have second thoughts about Grissom as she repeatedly rejects his phone calls.
285	12	"Double Fault"	Brad Tanenbaum	Melissa R. Byer & Treena Hancock	January 23, 2013	11.46
The CSIs investigate a case involving a rising tennis star, who the day after winning a tournament, is found dead in a tennis ball machine; the case connects to the disappearance of her parents and her brother. Finlay gets tips from former tennis pro Chris Evert. Meanwhile, Hodges talks to the team about his new Italian lover, Elisabetta; Morgan, however, has concerns that she may be using Hodges only as an easy way to get her Green Card.
286	13	"In Vino Veritas"	Louis Shaw Milito	Rick Eid	February 6, 2013	10.97
NYPD crime lab head Mac Taylor arrives in Las Vegas to surprise his girlfriend Christine, who is supposed to be in town for an event and drops by the LVPD Crime Lab to visit his friend D.B. Russell before heading to her hotel, where she is supposed to be attending a conference. When he fails to reach her on her phone, he and Russell head to the hotel only to find her missing and her room the scene of a crime. This leads to a fast investigation by the LVPD and Crime Lab who eventually learn Christine has been kidnapped. Meanwhile, the rest of the team works to find the killer of a man found inside a wine barrel, connected with a very rare vintage of French wine from the 1930s, only to reveal that it was actually a "fake" vintage from the atomic age. This episode begins a crossover with CSI: NY that concludes on "Seth and Apep".
287	14	"Exile"	Jeffrey Hunt	Carlos M. Marimon	February 13, 2013	8.54
The team investigate when the sister of a Cuban singing sensation is murdered. Elsewhere, Hodges begins to get cold feet about his engagement to Elisabetta.
288	15	"Forget Me Not"	Karen Gaviola	Andrew Dettmann	February 20, 2013	10.65
Sara becomes a suspect in an investigation when it is revealed she was the last person to see the victim alive, but she has no memory of committing the murder, despite the evidence connecting her to the crime. She later discovers that Edie's stalker, Ronald Basderic, is behind everything. During her ordeal, Sara has second thoughts about her marriage with Grissom, who is still away on assignment, realizing that long-distance relationships may not necessarily be sustainable. Matters become even more personal when Sara learns that Ronald visited her mother Laura (Note: Kay Lenz as Laura Sidle) at the hospital. During the investigation, Sara's co-workers see her as a philanderer who is having an affair behind Grissom's back, though Russell, Nick and Hodges suspect that she was framed, with a potential to be a set up for Basderic to murder Sara in the end.
289	16	"Last Woman Standing"	Brad Tanenbaum	Gavin Harris	February 27, 2013	9.44
CSIs analyze the murders of several prominent poker players, beginning with Peter Coe, (Note: David Cassidy as Peter Coe) all of whom are found to be linked to a cheating scandal at a prestigious tournament in the late 1990s. The team learns that each murder is related to a card in the questionable hand. Meanwhile, Ecklie accepts the offer to succeed Sherry Liston as Sheriff.
290	17	"Dead of the Class"	Alec Smight	Tom Mularz	March 20, 2013	10.53
The CSIs join David Phillips at his Class of 1998 high school reunion when he discovers that the prom queen's been murdered, with her blood circulating through soap bubbles generated out of a bubble machine. Further investigation reveals a bomb planted in the ceiling of the high school.
291	18	"Sheltered"	Louis Shaw Milito	Michael F.X. Daley	April 3, 2013	9.89
The CSIs discover a man from a hunting exposition found dead with his hands chopped off. The investigation later leads to a bomb shelter decorated like a modern suburban home, with the suspect living there with his daughter. They later find out that both are connected to a cold case involving a murder several years earlier in Carson City.
292	19	"Backfire"	Frank Waldeck	Jack Gutowitz	April 10, 2013	11.11
The CSIs investigate a triple homicide as Russell struggles to connect with its only witness, a six-year-old girl whose mother has gone missing.
293	20	"Fearless"	Eagle Egilsson	Gavin Harris	May 1, 2013	9.49
At a spiritual retreat that Hodges' Italian girlfriend, Elisabetta, was attending with her brother, they both discover a man who drowned in a mud bath. Later on, as a witness is giving her testimony at headquarters, she suffocates and died.
294	21	"Ghosts of the Past"	Brad Tanenbaum	Andrew Dettmann	May 8, 2013	9.82
The CSI team investigates the death of a ghost hunter which links to a case from twenty years earlier, and Greg tells Morgan about his psychic inheritance from his grandmother. Meanwhile, Sara gets word that a suspect from her past in San Francisco is up for parole.
295	22	"Skin in the Game"	Alec Smight	Story by : Christopher Barbour; Teleplay by : Christopher Barbour & Don McGill	May 15, 2013	9.53
Ecklie and D.B. meet Savoir Magazine reporter John Merchiston (Note: James Callis as John Merchiston) at a Black Sabbath concert. After Merchiston's interview with Ozzy Osbourne, he tags along with Russell during the night shift on a 419 (dead body) call. The team investigates a series of murders that relate to the seven deadly sins listed in Dante's Inferno, with clues hidden inside marked wooden dowels within Bibles at each scene - the same type of Bible used at a homeless mission run by Brother Daniel Larson. (Note: Eric Roberts as Daniel Larson) Robbins and Phillips restore a mummified victim's visage for identification. To capture the murderer, Morgan volunteers for a perilous undercover mission, posing as a call girl to Oliver Tate. (Note: Tim Matheson as Oliver Tate) Brass' ex-wife Nancy (Note: Annabella Sciorra as Nancy Brass) arrives after Brass informs her that their daughter Ellie is also in danger. After Tate becomes suspicious and declines Morgan's advances, she goes missing. Ellie is also captured and videotaped as the team watch helplessly.

== U.S. Nielsen ratings ==
Episode #	Title	Air date	18-49 Rating/Share	Viewers (in millions)	Rank (Week)
1	Karma to Burn (Part 2)	September 26, 2012	2.5/7	10.76	22
2	Code Blue Plate Special	October 10, 2012	2.6/7	10.70	19
3	Wild Flowers	October 17, 2012	2.3/7	10.63	16
4	It Was a Very Good Year	October 24, 2012	2.4/6	9.95	25
5	Play Dead	October 31, 2012	2.4/7	10.91	17
6	Pick and Roll	November 7, 2012	2.3/6	10.33	15
7	Fallen Angels	November 14, 2012	2.5/7	11.01	14
8	CSI on Fire	November 21, 2012	2.4/7	10.77	12
9	Strip Maul	November 28, 2012	2.6/7	12.11	12
10	Risky Business Class	December 12, 2012	2.2/6	9.59	21
11	Dead Air	January 16, 2013	2.3/6	11.14	15
12	Double Fault	January 23, 2013	2.6/7	11.46	10
13	In Vino Veritas (Part 1)	February 6, 2013	2.4/7	10.97	13
14	Exile	February 13, 2013	1.9/5	8.54	22
15	Forget Me Not	February 20, 2013	2.3/7	10.65	15
16	Last Woman Standing	February 27, 2013	1.9/5	9.44	14
17	Dead of the Class	March 20, 2013	2.3/6	10.53	8
18	Sheltered	April 3, 2013	2.1/6	9.89	20
19	Backfire	April 10, 2013	2.4/7	11.11	14
20	Fearless	May 1, 2013	1.9/5	9.49	—N/a
21	Ghosts of the Past	May 8, 2013	2.2/6	9.82	—N/a
22	Skin in the Game (Part 1)	May 15, 2013	2.0/6	9.53	—N/a
