= CSI: Crime Scene Investigation season 12 =

American TV show season

CSI: Crime Scene Investigation
- Season 12
- Season 12 U.S. DVD cover
- Starring: Ted Danson; Marg Helgenberger; George Eads; Jorja Fox; Eric Szmanda; Robert David Hall; Wallace Langham; David Berman; Elisabeth Harnois; Paul Guilfoyle; Elisabeth Shue
- No. of episodes: 22

Release
- Original network: CBS
- Original release: September 21, 2011 – May 9, 2012

Season chronology
- ← Previous; Season 11 Next → Season 13

The twelfth season of CSI: Crime Scene Investigation premiered on CBS on September 21, 2011, and ended on May 9, 2012. The series stars Ted Danson, Marg Helgenberger and Elisabeth Shue.

== Production ==
The show was moved to Wednesdays at 10:00 p.m. (P/E), following Criminal Minds.

== Plot ==
Catherine and Nick adjust to life working under D.B. Russell, following their demotions, while Morgan Brody joins the CSI team ("73 Seconds"), in the twelfth season of CSI. This season, the team investigate crimes including the murder of a family ("Tell Tale Hearts"), a drowning in chocolate ("Bittersweet"), a death at a mob museum ("Maid Men"), a cold-case killing ("Crime After Crime"), the zippering of a body ("Zippered") and a sadistic slaying ("Freaks and Geeks"). Meanwhile, D.B. struggles to keep control of his family ("Brain Doe"), Morgan's helicopter is hijacked mid-flight ("CSI Down"), Doc Robbins' wife finds herself at the center of an investigation ("Genetic Disorder"), and Catherine works alongside the FBI ("Ms. Willows Regrets"), before making a life-changing decision ("Willows in the Wind"). Then, it's all change at the LVPD when Russell recruits Julie Finlay ("Seeing Red"), fresh out of anger management and ready to tackle cases such as the theft of a house ("Stealing Home"), a crippling blackout ("CSI Unplugged"), a murder at an Alice-in-Wonderland style wedding ("Malice in Wonderland"), and a race-truck explosion ("Dune and Gloom"). Later, the troubles continue for the CSI's personal lives, as Finn and D.B. struggle to come to terms with their past relationship, Ecklie is gunned down, Nick leaves CSI, and the Crime Lab is placed under the supervision of an outside agency ("Homecoming").

== Cast ==
=== Main ===
- Ted Danson as D.B. Russell, a CSI Level 3 Supervisor and the Lab Director
- Marg Helgenberger as Catherine Willows, a CSI Level 3 Assistant Supervisor (episodes 1–12)
- George Eads as Nick Stokes, a CSI Level 3
- Jorja Fox as Sara Sidle, a CSI Level 3
- Eric Szmanda as Greg Sanders, a CSI Level 3
- Robert David Hall as Al Robbins, the Chief Medical Examiner
- Wallace Langham as David Hodges, a Trace Technician
- David Berman as David Phillips, an Assistant Medical Examiner
- Elisabeth Harnois as Morgan Brody, a CSI Level 3
- Paul Guilfoyle as Jim Brass, a Homicide Detective Captain
- Elisabeth Shue as Julie "Finn" Finlay, a CSI Level 3 Assistant Supervisor (episodes 14–22)

=== Recurring ===
- Marc Vann as Conrad Ecklie (episodes 2, 4, 5, 12, 18, 21, 22)
- Jon Wellner as Henry Andrews (episodes 3, 5, 6, 8, 10–12, 14–17, 19–21)
- Larry M. Mitchell as Officer Mitchell (episodes 2, 3, 12, 13, 15, 19)
- Barbara Eve Harris as Sheriff Sherry Liston (episodes 4, 7, 8, 13, 22)
- Alex Carter as Lou Vartann (episodes 7, 8, 11, 14, 21)
- Monique Gabriela Curnen as Xiomara Garcia (episodes 2, 4, 9)
- Archie Kao as Archie Johnson (episodes 11, 17, 19)

=== Changes ===
Ted Danson and Elisabeth Shue join the main cast, replacing Laurence Fishburne and the outgoing Marg Helgenberger, respectively. Elisabeth Harnois becomes a series regular. Episode 13 of this season is the first and only episode of the CSI franchise not to feature a female lead.

== Episodes ==
| No. overall | No. in season | Title | Directed by | Written by | Original release date | US viewers (millions) |
|---|---|---|---|---|---|---|
| 252 | 1 | "73 Seconds" | Alec Smight | Gavin Harris | September 21, 2011 | 12.74 |
Ray Langston is cleared of wrongdoing in regards to the brutal death of Nate Haskell and moves to Baltimore to be with his ex-wife. With the CSI department still in chaos following the Haskell case that led to Ray's departure, the LVPD bring on-board its new supervisor from Seattle, D.B. Russell; and Ecklie's daughter, Morgan Brody, who has since left Los Angeles' SID. Their first case: a crazy, chaotic shoot-out on a hotel tram that leaves two people dead, almost no witnesses, and a lot of contradictory evidence. Meanwhile, another dead man in Brime County has a young man's face and an old man's body. (Special appearance by Carrot Top.)
| 253 | 2 | "Tell-Tale Hearts" | Brad Tanenbaum | Story by : Larry M. Mitchell; Teleplay by : Joe Pokaski | September 28, 2011 | 11.76 |
Following a grisly murder that killed a family of four people, a trail of blood leads to a neighbor across the street who was spying on one of its victims: a little girl. But even after Brass and Willows extract a confession out of the suspect, Russell is skeptical that he committed the murders. Complicating the matter, two other suspects come forward and admit to committing the murders, leaving the CSIs to examine the evidence to determine who is telling the truth.
| 254 | 3 | "Bittersweet" | Frank Waldeck | Melissa R. Byer & Treena Hancock | October 5, 2011 | 11.98 |
While on a date with Doc Robbins' niece, Nick realizes a piece of found art at an exhibit has decomposing body parts in it, which leads to a full-blown investigation that connects with an older, since-closed case involving a woman who kidnapped and killed young girls. Russell takes Sara off the case, due to her involvement in the old case. Meanwhile, Brody and Sanders find an obese man who drowned in a vat of chocolate, later discovering that the same man was once the chocolatier's svelte and muscular spokesperson.
| 255 | 4 | "Maid Man" | Martha Coolidge | Dustin Lee Abraham | October 12, 2011 | 10.93 |
Former Mayor of Las Vegas Oscar Goodman is shot at the grand opening of the Mob Museum (Note: The Mob Museum, of which Oscar Goodman was one of the creators, would open officially to the public several months later, on February 14, 2012.) and the CSIs embark on a history lesson in search of clues; one of the suspects was a henchman for the late Lou Gedda's crime syndicate - who appears to have resurfaced to the public eye after thirty years. Meanwhile a maid is found dead in a hotel room, stabbed in the eye with a swizzle stick.
| 256 | 5 | "CSI Down" | Jeffrey Hunt | Story by : Gavin Harris; Teleplay by : Tom Mularz | October 19, 2011 | 10.79 |
A man left for dead in the desert by a local street gang is transported to hospital in a medevac helicopter with Morgan on board. However, he hijacks the chopper and orders it to fly towards Mexico, out of fear that the gang is still out for him to make sure he stays dead.
| 257 | 6 | "Freaks & Geeks" | Alec Smight | Christopher Barbour | November 2, 2011 | 10.79 |
After the seemingly sadist torture/murder of popular sideshow performer Rachel Grier (aka Femmistopheles), the team goes behind the scenes of the carnival freak show to find her killer. They speak to her niece Silvia Grier (Note: Skyler Day as Silvia Grier) who had seen her a few days before she died, and to Rachel's estranged sister Dr. Jennifer Grier. (Note: Suzanne Cryer as Dr. Jennifer Grier)
| 258 | 7 | "Brain Doe" | Brad Tanenbaum | Gavin Harris | November 9, 2011 | 10.16 |
Following a bizarre multiple car crash in front of a fast food joint that took the lives of three drivers, the CSIs discover a human brain that does not belong to any of the victims. Meanwhile, D.B. Russell's son is in trouble at school when he is suspended from his basketball team. Sheriff Sherry Liston recommends Willows to a position with the Forensic Science Commission for the Senate Judiciary Committee in Washington D.C..
| 259 | 8 | "Crime After Crime" | Paul McCrane | Story by : Richard Catalani; Teleplay by : Tom Mularz | November 16, 2011 | 10.60 |
When the CSI team investigates three seemingly unrelated murders, the death of a successful businessman found dead on his large birthday cake, a gang member burned to death inside some car tires, and a woman killed in a motel by being forced to take PCP, they discover someone is getting revenge for cold case murders that were never solved. The crimes are traced to a former police detective (and a friend of Brass) who desires to see justice served the hard way before he dies of terminal cancer.
| 260 | 9 | "Zippered" | Alec Smight | Joe Pokaski | December 7, 2011 | 11.14 |
The murder of a retired Army Ranger brings the FBI in on the case, to Russell and Catherine's initial chagrin. The CSIs and the FBI discover that a shipment of military grade machine guns have been stolen from the Middle East and made its way to Las Vegas. Catherine also reconnects with an old friend, Laura Gabriel, who is revealed to be involved in the case.
| 261 | 10 | "Genetic Disorder" | Frank Waldeck | Elizabeth Devine | December 14, 2011 | 12.23 |
When Dan Traxler's dead body turns up naked in the bed of Doc's wife Judy, (Note: Wendy Crewson as Judy Robbins) CSIs must "work the scene" for "Doc Robbins, coroner, not Al Robbins, husband," while setting aside obvious assumptions of death-during-adultery. When it is discovered that Traxler was a genealogist hired by Mrs.Robbins, the team use genealogy records to track down the murderer.
| 262 | 11 | "Ms. Willows Regrets" | Louis Shaw Milito | Story by : Christopher Barbour; Teleplay by : Christopher Barbour & Don McGill | January 18, 2012 | 12.02 |
(Part 1) Catherine's friend Laura Gabriel's mogul husband Mark has a lot to hide behind his successful international corporation, and he has hired a crack team of assassins to carry out the murders of anyone who might be aware of what he is doing – and that includes Laura's lawyer and Laura herself. With the CSIs digging deeper into the case, the team and especially Catherine - find themselves in the crosshairs.
| 263 | 12 | "Willows in the Wind" | Alec Smight | Story by : Carol Mendelsohn & Don McGill; Teleplay by : Christopher Barbour & Richard Catalani | January 25, 2012 | 14.26 |
(Part 2) Catherine and Russell rely on her connections from her previous line of work in order to escape Mark Gabriel and his hitmen. Once they make it back to headquarters, Russell has a plan to catch Mark - fake Catherine's death. At the end, Catherine announces her resignation from the CSI unit to work for the FBI.
| 264 | 13 | "Tressed to Kill" | Brad Tanenbaum | Ed Whitmore | February 8, 2012 | 10.88 |
The CSI team investigates a series of murders by a serial killer who uses hair that he covertly cuts off as a "hit list", then paralyses and kills his victims while dressing them up in 1970s fashion pieces.
| 265 | 14 | "Seeing Red" | Frank Waldeck | Christopher Barbour & Tom Mularz | February 15, 2012 | 11.09 |
As Nick and Morgan enjoy Mexican food on their lunch break, they witness Wes Clyborn (Note: Jesse McCartney as Wes Clyborn) driving into an advertising van. He survives his injuries, including two gunshots. Russell enlists a former colleague, "blood whisperer" Julie Finlay, to assist on a case involving the death of the Wes' ex-girlfriend, and blood spray from four different people. After the case is solved, Russell invites Finlay to work with him as part of the CSI
| 266 | 15 | "Stealing Home" | Alec Smight | Treena Hancock & Melissa R. Byer | February 22, 2012 | 11.91 |
As Finlay begins her first day as a CSI, the team examines an unusual case: the theft of an entire house. After they locate it, they discover something sinister within its walls - a dead body.
| 267 | 16 | "CSI Unplugged" | Jeffrey Hunt | Gavin Harris | February 29, 2012 | 11.30 |
As the CSIs are examining a murder-kidnapping case involving a young child, a thunderstorm takes down the power grid in half of Nevada, including Las Vegas and CSI headquarters. The CSIs resort to old-school and sometimes 'ancient' methods to gather answers on who the perpetrator was and where to find the child before it's too late.
| 268 | 17 | "Trends with Benefits" | Louis Shaw Milito | Jack Gutowitz | March 14, 2012 | 11.71 |
During a frat party full of party-going students, a photo of a dead student goes viral on social media. The CSIs find the student who posted the picture, and try to determine if it was suicide.
| 269 | 18 | "Malice in Wonderland" | Alec Smight | Joe Pokaski | March 21, 2012 | 11.38 |
When the CSI team is called in to investigate a robbery-homicide at an "Alice In Wonderland"-themed wedding that took the life of the groom, they have little to work with to find a killer. After another wedding robbery soon after, they discover that some things come in threes. David's mother Olivia Hodges (Note: Jaclyn Smith as Olivia Hodges) comes to town, and he wants her to believe Morgan is his girlfriend.
| 270 | 19 | "Split Decisions" | Brad Tanenbaum | Michael F.X. Daley & Richard Catalani | April 4, 2012 | 12.06 |
A casino is locked down immediately after a man is shot by an assailant. But even with advanced facial recognition technology, the murderer escapes the crime scene. CSIs track down three identical suspects, Xavier Marx, Kevin Chance and Jordan Brentson, who are biological triplets by means of in vitro fertilisation. Matters are complicated further when Jordan's lawyer arrives; his mother, Vivian Brentson. (Note: Stepfanie Kramer as Vivian Brentson) With three sets of identical DNA, the team must rely on antibody profiling, which points to a fourth conspirator.
| 271 | 20 | "Altered Stakes" | David Semel | Story by : Melissa R. Byer & Treena Hancock; Teleplay by : Elizabeth Devine | April 11, 2012 | 9.94 |
As the CSI team play the vice squad in a friendly softball match, Nick cuts the game short when he learns from Brass that a man he helped put in prison, with connections to the late detective Sam Vega, is going to have his conviction overturned. The CSIs needs to prove the killer is guilty again or he will be released. Also: Hodges develops an affinity for Italian culture after a recent trip to Italy.
| 272 | 21 | "Dune and Gloom" | Jeffrey Hunt | Tom Mularz | May 2, 2012 | 9.75 |
During a dune buggy race in the Nevada desert, a team encounters a burned out dune buggy with a dead body inside, with his surviving teammates leaving the race in a hurry. The CSIs determine who was involved in the disaster.
| 273 | 22 | "Homecoming" | Alec Smight | Story by : Christopher Barbour & Larry M. Mitchell; Teleplay by : Christopher Barbour & Don McGill | May 9, 2012 | 10.73 |
When a friend of Sheriff Liston becomes a prime suspect in his wife's brutal murder and the murder of two others, the investigation's political fallout reveals the truth behind Russell's troubled history with Finlay. It is later revealed that an old foe of the CSIs is calling the shots from prison and employing some of Lou Gedda's henchmen, leading to Sheriff Liston to announce drastic reforms of the LVPD in order to rein in corruption among the ranks. Frustrated of the developments, Nick considers leaving CSI after remembering Catherine's "there's the door" speech from the 73 Seconds episode. As the heat on McKeen and his accomplices is turned up, undersheriff Conrad Ecklie is shot, and Russell's granddaughter is kidnapped.

== Ratings ==
=== U.S. Nielsen ratings ===
| Episode # | Title | Air Date | 18-49 | Viewers | Rank (Week) |
|---|---|---|---|---|---|
| 1 | 73 Seconds | September 21, 2011 | 3.2/9 | 12.74 million | 18 |
| 2 | Tell-Tale Hearts | September 28, 2011 | 3.1/8 | 11.76 million | 18 |
| 3 | Bittersweet | October 5, 2011 | 2.9/8 | 11.98 million | 14 |
| 4 | Maid Man | October 12, 2011 | 2.6/7 | 10.93 million | 21 |
| 5 | CSI Down | October 19, 2011 | 2.6/7 | 10.79 million | —N/a |
| 6 | Freaks & Geeks | November 2, 2011 | 2.7/7 | 10.79 million | —N/a |
| 7 | Brain Doe | November 9, 2011 | 2.5/7 | 10.16 million | —N/a |
| 8 | Crime After Crime | November 16, 2011 | 2.6/7 | 10.60 million | 24 |
| 9 | Zippered (Part 1) | December 7, 2011 | 2.5/7 | 11.14 million | 19 |
| 10 | Genetic Disorder | December 14, 2011 | 2.9/8 | 12.23 million | 12 |
| 11 | Ms. Willows Regrets (Part 2) | January 18, 2012 | 2.8/7 | 12.02 million | 13 |
| 12 | Willows in the Wind (Part 3) | January 25, 2012 | 3.4/9 | 14.26 million | 4 |
| 13 | Tressed to Kill | February 8, 2012 | 2.5/7 | 10.88 million | 19 |
| 14 | Seeing Red | February 15, 2012 | 2.6/7 | 11.09 million | 13 |
| 15 | Stealing Home | February 22, 2012 | 2.9/8 | 11.91 million | 15 |
| 16 | CSI Unplugged | February 29, 2012 | 2.6/7 | 11.30 million | 14 |
| 17 | Trends with Benefits | March 14, 2012 | 2.8/8 | 11.71 million | 5 |
| 18 | Malice in Wonderland | March 21, 2012 | 2.6/7 | 11.38 million | 7 |
| 19 | Split Decisions | April 4, 2012 | 2.9/8 | 12.06 million | 9 |
| 20 | Altered Stakes | April 11, 2012 | 2.4/6 | 9.94 million | 16 |
| 21 | Dune and Gloom | May 2, 2012 | 2.3/6 | 9.75 million | 19 |
| 22 | Homecoming (Part 1) | May 9, 2012 | 2.4/7 | 10.73 million | 18 |
