= CSI: Crime Scene Investigation season 14 =

American TV show season

CSI: Crime Scene Investigation
- Season 14
- Season 14 U.S. DVD cover
- Starring: Ted Danson; Elisabeth Shue; George Eads; Jorja Fox; Eric Szmanda; Robert David Hall; Wallace Langham; David Berman; Elisabeth Harnois; Jon Wellner; Paul Guilfoyle
- No. of episodes: 22

Release
- Original network: CBS
- Original release: September 25, 2013 – May 7, 2014

Season chronology
- ← Previous; Season 13 Next → Season 15

The fourteenth season of CSI: Crime Scene Investigation premiered on September 25, 2013, on CBS, and ended on May 7, 2014. The season stars Ted Danson and Elisabeth Shue.

== Production ==
The series's 300th episode aired during the season, with Marg Helgenberger guest starring in the landmark episode in a series of newly recorded "flashbacks" to a case that occurred in the time frame of the first season. Due to the leave of absence taken by George Eads following his altercation with a writer, he appears only in the first three episodes of the season, under the pretext of receiving special training in Quantico. Eads returned in the episode "Check In and Check Out". The season also introduced a redesigned title sequence.

On February 18, 2014, CBS announced plans to launch a new spin-off of the CSI franchise, tentatively titled CSI: Cyber, with a backdoor pilot episode, entitled "Kitty", that aired April 30, 2014. Inspired by producer Mary Aiken's work as a cyber-psychologist, the new series revolves around Special Agent Avery Ryan, played by Patricia Arquette, who is in charge of the Cyber division at FBI Headquarters in Washington, D.C. The show was officially picked up by CBS on May 9, 2014. On March 13, 2014, it was announced that CSI: Crime Scene Investigation would return for a fifteenth season, which started airing in September 2014.

== Plot ==
D.B. and Finn lead the hunt for Morgan, while Brody makes a shocking discovery that endangers her own life ("The Devil and D.B. Russell"), in the fourteenth season of CSI. Also this season the team investigate the unusual, the brutal, and the life-changing, including a casino heist ("Take the Money and Run"), a night-club fire ("Torch Song"), a contact lens discovered on a cookery show ("Last Supper"), a cold case that takes the team, and Willows, back to 2000 ("Frame by Frame"), the death of a homeless man ("Passed Pawns"), a body in a human hamster ball ("Helpless"), a stabbing at a hotel ("Check In and Check Out"), the murder of Santa ("The Lost Reindeer"), a petty crime on a plane ("Keep Calm and Carry On"), a car-crash ("Boston Brakes"), a murder in Mexico ("De Los Muertos"), and the death of a sixteen year old ("Love for Sale"). Meanwhile, Greg is accused of framing a man seven years ago ("Under a Cloud"), Sara, Morgan and Finn head to a spa ("Girls Gone Wild"), D.B. is taken hostage ("The Fallen"), the team track a cannibal ("Consumed"), and Brass has to make a decision when his daughter attempts suicide ("Dead In His Tracks"). Avery Ryan, meanwhile, heads to Las Vegas to work alongside the CSI team when a casino owner's wife is killed in a cyber-related case ("Kitty").

== Cast ==
=== Changes ===
Paul Guilfoyle, who plays Jim Brass, left the series at the end of the 14th season. Marg Helgenberger guest stars, Patricia Arquette makes her franchise debut as Avery Ryan.

=== Main cast ===
- Ted Danson as D.B. Russell, a CSI Level 3 Supervisor and the Lab Director
- Elisabeth Shue as Julie Finlay, a CSI Level 3 Assistant Supervisor
- George Eads as Nick Stokes, a CSI Level 3
- Jorja Fox as Sara Sidle, a CSI Level 3
- Eric Szmanda as Greg Sanders, a CSI Level 3
- Robert David Hall as Al Robbins, the Chief Medical Examiner
- Wallace Langham as David Hodges, a Trace Technician
- David Berman as David Phillips, an Assistant Medical Examiner
- Elisabeth Harnois as Morgan Brody, a CSI Level 3
- Jon Wellner as Henry Andrews, a DNA and Toxicology Technician
- Paul Guilfoyle as Jim Brass, a Homicide Detective Captain

=== Recurring ===
- Marc Vann as Conrad Ecklie
- Matthew Davis as Sean Yeager
- Larry M. Mitchell as Officer Mitchell

=== Guest stars ===
- Marg Helgenberger as Catherine Willows
- John de Lancie as General Robert Landsdale
- Patricia Arquette as Avery Ryan
- John Ratzenberger as Stu Kirchoff (episode 3)
- Catrinel Marlon as Elisabetta, Hodges' fiancé (episode 4)
- Wolfgang Puck as Himself (episode 4)
- Lea Thompson as Jennifer Rhodes (episode 7)
- Sherilyn Fenn as Madame Suzanne (episode 15)
- Ron Glass as Paul Lomax (episode 16)
- Gene Simmons as Himself (episode 17)

== Episodes ==
| No. overall | No. in season | Title | Directed by | Written by | Original release date | US viewers (millions) |
|---|---|---|---|---|---|---|
| 296 | 1 | "The Devil and D.B. Russell" | Alec Smight | Story by : Christopher Barbour; Teleplay by : Christopher Barbour & Don McGill | September 25, 2013 | 9.12 |
After events in "Skin in the Game" in which the Dante's Inferno murders claimed several lives, Russell's CSIs discover that both Morgan and Ellie have been kidnapped. The kidnapper gives Ecklie and Brass six hours to decide which of the two should live or die. Both Daniel Larson (Note: Eric Roberts as Daniel Larson) and Oliver Tate (Note: Tim Matheson as Oliver Tate) maintain their innocence in the killings, as new suspects and motives are discovered. The team attend a church service after the tragic consequences for yet another loved one. Savoir Magazine reporter John Merchiston (Note: James Callis as John Merchiston) completes his story.
| 297 | 2 | "Take the Money and Run" | Louis Shaw Milito | Andrew Dettmann | October 2, 2013 | 9.66 |
During a heist of a high stakes casino poker game, a casino guard is shot, and a fleeing motorcyclist dies, surrounded by hundreds of thousands of dollars in what is soon revealed to be fake money in a bizarre heist
| 298 | 3 | "Torch Song" | Brad Tanenbaum | Story by : Elizabeth Devine; Teleplay by : Tom Mularz | October 9, 2013 | 8.82 |
A night club owned by Stu Kirchoff (Note: John Ratzenberger as Stu Kirchoff) hosting a hatecore band goes up in flames. While most attendees escape with their lives, four are killed, including members of the band. The CSI team goes looking for the arsonist who, like the band, is a devout neo-Nazi. Note: Guest star John Ratzenberger was Ted Danson's co-star on his earlier series, Cheers.
| 299 | 4 | "Last Supper" | Frank Waldeck | Treena Hancock & Melissa R. Byer | October 16, 2013 | 9.45 |
An episode of cooking reality show Elite Chef begins with a tasting challenge where, unknown to the contestants and host Wolfgang Puck, the secret ingredient has been switched to human flesh, later identified as that of a recently eliminated contestant. CSIs take a close look at the "ingredients" in order to find the murderous chef. Meanwhile, Hodges and Elisabetta break off their engagement, after realizing that neither of them would be happy away from their longtime homes.
| 300 | 5 | "Frame by Frame" | Alec Smight | Gavin Harris | October 23, 2013 | 10.45 |
The team examines a young woman's murder at movie producer Jack Witten's (Note: Jason Priestley as Jack Witten) mansion. Sara and Ecklie relate this case to a cold case they investigated fourteen years earlier under Willows' supervision, involving yet another young woman who was presumed to have been murdered by the same suspect, Jack Witten. Note: On CSI's 300th episode, guest star Marg Helgenberger reprises her role as Catherine Willows in newly-filmed flashbacks.
| 301 | 6 | "Passed Pawns" | Phil Conserva | Story by : Michael F.X. Daley; Teleplay by : Christopher Barbour | October 30, 2013 | 9.50 |
CSIs take a hard look at casino employees after a homeless man uses his last $200 to win $350,000 at black jack at a small casino, and is later found beaten to death in an alley. CSIs try to determine who was at fault, and learn that the victim had a connection with the murderer, and the pawn shop where he pawned his jewelry.
| 302 | 7 | "Under a Cloud" | Brad Tanenbaum | Elizabeth Devine & Richard Catalani | November 6, 2013 | 9.08 |
A John Doe found barely alive during a torrential rain storm is admitted to the hospital. Sara examines his personal effects and discovers a bomb inside his satchel. The team are able to determine that he intended to commit a terrorist act at a local casino when the FBI gets involved. Greg is investigated by Defense Criminalist Jennifer Rhodes (Note: Lea Thompson as Jennifer Rhodes) when he is accused of framing a man for murder seven years prior.
| 303 | 8 | "Helpless" | Karen Gaviola | Tom Mularz | November 13, 2013 | 10.47 |
CSIs examine a bludgeoned, bloody corpse inside a "human hamster ball" that rolled around a neighborhood, leading to a discovery that it was an act of "claustrophilia" gone wrong. They later find his girlfriend, who mailed herself to death. Also: Morgan works with a swing shift CSI on a rape case, involving that CSI's son as the suspect.
| 304 | 9 | "Check In and Check Out" | Louis Shaw Milito | Andrew Dettmann | November 20, 2013 | 11.19 |
CSIs are called to a local motel where a series of grisly murders took place. Not only have they been committed by otherwise outstanding citizens with no record, they all occurred in the same room. Hodges and Henry find the answer the hard way.
| 305 | 10 | "Girls Gone Wild" | Alec Smight | Melissa R. Byer & Treena Hancock | November 27, 2013 | 10.94 |
En-route to Reno for a weekend at a spa resort, Sara, Finlay, and Morgan find themselves stranded in a small town with car trouble. Their stay leads to a murder investigation after a dead body under a hood of a stolen car is found, and a missing persons case when Finlay disappears. The CSI team must piece together what happened in detail to find her.
| 306 | 11 | "The Lost Reindeer" | Frank Waldeck | Gavin Harris | December 11, 2013 | 10.18 |
"Santa Claus" is found dead on the artificial snow-covered front lawn of a suburban house the morning after a elaborate holiday party complete with a live reindeer. CSIs discover his death was in connection with the illicit trade of another kind of "snow" - cocaine. Meanwhile, CSIs guess who their "secret Santas" are, when they receive their gifts.
| 307 | 12 | "Keep Calm and Carry-On" | Brad Tanenbaum | Thomas Hoppe | January 15, 2014 | 10.30 |
Shortly after an inbound plane to Vegas makes its landing, Kenny Greene (Note: Jaleel White as Kenny Greene) and eleven other passengers report having their belongings stolen. CSIs later find suspected thief Janet Riggins (Note: Ellen Hollman as Janet Riggins / Helen Morrison) dead at the end of a runway. After analyzing the plane's seating chart, and the location of the raided overhead bins, the real thief Hank Kasserman (Note: Joel Grey as Hank Kasserman) is identified, leaving the remaining mystery of who killed Janet, and why. Analysis of her drivers license reveals it to be a fake. Janet is really Helen Morrison, fleeing her abusive husband Allen to meet with a janitor with connections to "The Wolf" who could help her "disappear." The team must then determine if her husband, or someone else, killed her.
| 308 | 13 | "Boston Brakes" | Eagle Egilsson | Christopher Barbour | January 22, 2014 | 9.47 |
After events in "The Devil and D.B. Russell," reporter John Merchiston returns, working on an exposé involving a domestic spying program called Project Jerico. After a mystery woman (aka Emily Rey) (Note: Monica Bîrlădeanu as Emily Rey) hands him an encrypted flash drive, Merchiston is apparently killed by an explosive car crash following a high-speed chase. His lawyer Jill McDermott arrives to claim his body, revealing he was investigating Airforce General Robert Lansdale's (Note: John de Lancie as General Robert Lansdale) involvement in the program. When Emily Rey turns up dead, with Merchiston's print on the murder weapon, FBI Special Agent Sturgis (Note: Greg Ellis as Special Agent Sturgis) takes over the investigation, questioning Finlay and Russell. Russell and the team try to locate Merchiston's source, Suvari, and decrypt the flash drive to reveal details on how automobiles can be driven by remote control via "black box" hacking.
| 309 | 14 | "De Los Muertos" | Louis Shaw Milito | Story by : Richard Catalani; Teleplay by : Tom Mularz | February 5, 2014 | 11.16 |
Robbins and Nick travel to Mexico to assist a local coroner in investigating a Las Vegas woman who was found murdered in a Mexican town. Meanwhile, back in the states, CSIs are called when a local couple are found dead inside their driveway, and the investigation soon reveals everyone is working on the same case.
| 310 | 15 | "Love for Sale" | Frank Waldeck | Andrew Dettmann | February 19, 2014 | 9.77 |
Nick and Greg investigate the rape and murder 16 year-old Helping Homes volunteer Debbie Logan, after they find evidence linking her to a brothel run by Madame Suzanne. (Note: Sherilyn Fenn as Madame Suzanne) Among other patrons, they find Brine County Supervisor Roger Ridley (Note: John Heard as Roger Ridley) and Debbie's father, Minister Jim Logan. (Note: Jack Coleman as Jim Logan) Other family ties are soon revealed.
| 311 | 16 | "Killer Moves" | Alec Smight | Mary Leah Sutton | March 5, 2014 | 9.29 |
Sara and Sanders investigate the murder of "The King" (an Elvis impersonator) whose body was found near a rook that was stabbed to death. They later discover that the victims and the location of their deaths are playing out a sadistic chess match. The investigation moves to the King's Crown international chess festival where suspects include Paul Lomax, (Note: Ron Glass as Paul Lomax) a chess expert who tutored Sanders in his youth, and retired chess grand master Troy Parker who has lived a reclusive life in recent years. Lomax gives Saunders the key; that the killings represent the opening moves that had already been played in the 1998 championship match between Karl Schrute (Note: Carlo Rota as Karl Schrute) and Troy Parker sixteen years prior. Note: Features Ron Glass in his final screen role before his death on November 25, 2016.
| 312 | 17 | "Long Road Home" | Phil Conserva | Gavin Harris | March 12, 2014 | 10.15 |
CSIs look into the murder of a rock and roll groupie and the disappearance of a prostitute that both have ties to a mysterious band of wannabe musicians. The investigation reveals a surprising connection to Kiss frontman, Gene Simmons.
| 313 | 18 | "Uninvited" | Brad Tanenbaum | Story by : Treena Hancock & Melissa R. Byer; Teleplay by : Elizabeth Devine | March 19, 2014 | 10.20 |
CSIs are called to investigate after the Connors, a family of four, has been missing for a month. Suspects included a man who mysteriously moved into their vacated house after his release from prison, and Marvin Braxton (Note: Robert Davi as Marvin Braxton) from whom the father, Dwight, embezzled $500,000. Complicating matters, all of their furniture was removed, making it more difficult for Finlay determine who killed who from the blood spatter. The neighbor Madge (Note: Edie McClurg as Madge) provides a clue – the moving company used to remove the family's belongings. Now they must track down the bodies and/or survivors of family members in order to identify the killer(s).
| 314 | 19 | "The Fallen" | Louis Shaw Milito | Deanna Shumaker | April 2, 2014 | 9.77 |
A teenage boy opens fire at the police station, killing two officers and takes Russell and an injured civilian hostage. Russell, with the help of CSIs, attempts to defuse the situation before either the kid starts shooting again or the SWAT officers open fire. The investigation reveals that the teen's shooting spree was an inside job.
| 315 | 20 | "Consumed" | Karen Gaviola | Tom Mularz | April 9, 2014 | 9.11 |
CSIs track a cannibalistic killer and discover he's not alone. Then the case is complicated by several confusing and conflicting tales of the killer which the team determine to be an attempt to spread the unique mythologic legend of the cannibalistic criminal. The team's investigation into the world of vore also leads them to a woman who was murdered by being stabbed in the stomach while an endoscopic camera was inside her.
| 316 | 21 | "Kitty" | Eagle Egilsson | Carol Mendelsohn & Ann Donahue & Anthony E. Zuiker | April 30, 2014 | 9.95 |
After a casino owner's wife is murdered in an otherwise secure electronic smart house, CSIs enlist Avery Ryan (Note: Patricia Arquette as Avery Ryan) of the FBI’s Cyber Crime Division to determine what created the chink in the house's electronic armor. Note: This episode is the backdoor pilot for the spin-off series, CSI: Cyber.
| 317 | 22 | "Dead in His Tracks" | Alec Smight | Andrew Dettmann | May 7, 2014 | 10.01 |
In 1989, three boys find a dying man in a shack alongside the railroad track, with proceeds from a robbery. Twenty-five years later, CSIs are called to examine a recent murder that may be related to the cold case death of Scotty, one of the three boys. Self-taught criminalist Sam Bishop, (Note: Treat Williams as Sam Bishop) who was a deputy during the original case, is initially suspected. After being cleared, he lends his findings and insights to the team to solve both the cold and recent cases. Brass's daughter Ellie is admitted to the hospital following a suicide attempt while in town for arraignment in her murder case, leading to a career-changing decision for the sake of his daughter.

== U.S. Nielsen ratings ==
| Episode No. | Title | Air Date | 18-49 Rating/Share | Viewers (in millions) | Rank (week) |
|---|---|---|---|---|---|
| 1 | The Devil and D.B. Russell (Part 2) | September 25, 2013 | 2.0/6 | 9.12 | —N/a |
| 2 | Take the Money and Run | October 2, 2013 | 2.1/6 | 9.66 | #24 |
| 3 | Torch Song | October 9, 2013 | 1.9/5 | 8.82 | #25 |
| 4 | Last Supper | October 16, 2013 | 2.0/6 | 9.45 | #20 |
| 5 | Frame By Frame | October 23, 2013 | 2.1/6 | 10.45 | #21 |
| 6 | Passed Pawns | October 30, 2013 | 1.7/5 | 9.50 | —N/a |
| 7 | Under a Cloud | November 6, 2013 | 1.8/5 | 9.08 | —N/a |
| 8 | Helpless | November 13, 2013 | 1.9/6 | 10.47 | —N/a |
| 9 | Check in and Check Out | November 20, 2013 | 2.1/6 | 11.19 | —N/a |
| 10 | Girls Gone Wild | November 27, 2013 | 2.0/6 | 10.94 | —N/a |
| 11 | Lost Reindeer | December 11, 2013 | 1.8/5 | 10.18 | —N/a |
| 12 | Keep Calm and Carry On | January 15, 2014 | 1.6/4 | 10.30 | —N/a |
| 13 | Boston Brakes | January 22, 2014 | 1.6/4 | 9.47 | —N/a |
| 14 | De Los Muertos | February 5, 2014 | 2.0/6 | 11.16 | —N/a |
| 15 | Love For Sale | February 19, 2014 | 2.0/6 | 9.77 | —N/a |
| 16 | Killer Moves | March 5, 2014 | 1.7/5 | 9.29 | —N/a |
| 17 | Long Road Home | March 12, 2014 | 2.0/6 | 10.15 | —N/a |
| 18 | Uninvited | March 19, 2014 | 2.0/6 | 10.20 | —N/a |
| 19 | The Fallen | April 2, 2014 | 1.8/5 | 9.77 | —N/a |
| 20 | Consumed | April 9, 2014 | 1.7/5 | 9.11 | —N/a |
| 21 | Kitty | April 30, 2014 | 1.7/5 | 9.95 | —N/a |
| 22 | Dead In His Tracks | May 7, 2014 | 1.9/6 | 10.01 | —N/a |
