= Kitty (CSI: Crime Scene Investigation) =

- CSI: Crime Scene Investigation episode
- Episode no.: Season 14; Episode 21
- Directed by: Eagle Egilsson
- Written by: Ann Donahue & Carol Mendelsohn & Anthony E. Zuiker
- Original air date: 30 April 2014
- Running time: 44 minutes

Guest appearances
- Patricia Arquette as Avery Ryan; Marc Vann as Conrad Ecklie; Torrey DeVitto as Kitty/Susan McDowell; Cheyenne Jackson as Nebula1; Gil Bellows as Lee Berman

Episode chronology
← Previous "Consumed"	Next → "Dead in His Tracks"
- CSI: Crime Scene Investigation (season 14)

"Kitty" is the twenty-first episode of the fourteenth season of the American crime drama television series CSI: Crime Scene Investigation. The 316th episode of the series overall, it was written by Ann Donahue, Carol Mendelsohn and series creator Anthony E. Zuiker, and directed by Eagle Egilsson, and originally aired on April 30, 2014 on CBS. "Kitty" introduced FBI Agent Avery Ryan from the spin-off series CSI: Cyber, for which this episode served as the backdoor pilot. Despite being credited Jorja Fox and Jon Wellner who portray Sara Sidle and Henry Andrews do not appear in this episode (although the latter does appear in a deleted scene).

== Plot ==
The episode begins with a house's security system being disabled. Then a dark figure walks into a bedroom and murders the woman in the bedroom. The scene cuts to Jim Brass (Paul Guilfoyle) yelling orders at the police officers and trying to get rid of the press. Nick Stokes (George Eads) catches up with a suspect (Gil Bellows) and tests him for GSR which comes back positive so he is arrested. D.B. Russell (Ted Danson) enters the house and he notices that the technology seems to follow him and the lights turn on when he walks past them. Greg Sanders (Eric Szmanda) tells D.B. that he believes the house is a smart house. While Julie Finlay (Elisabeth Shue) is taking crime scene photos, Al Robbins (Robert David Hall) gives a brief belief of what he believes happened. When D.B. looks through the suspect's (revealed as the victim's husband Lee Berman) computer he notices a photo of a woman (Torrey DeVitto) but then the computer crashes. The scene cuts to Washington, D.C. where a woman (Avery Ryan, Patricia Arquette) from the FBI is sitting on the phone demanding a flight to Las Vegas because the Kitty case is involved in a murder.

At an airfield Avery arrives where a pilot complains about her wanting to stop at Vegas, she then tells the pilot things he doesn't like about himself and he quickly tells her that she can come.

In Las Vegas, Brass is interviewing Berman about his wife's murder. It is shown that Avery is watching the interview, Avery asks Conrad Ecklie (Marc Vann) if she can go in and interview. Avery starts to quiz Berman about Kitty. Berman demands his solicitors to leave the room but when Avery tells him that she knows when people are lying he calls his solicitors back in.

D.B., Julie, Nick and David Hodges look for Kitty in the database, Avery explains about the deep web and then gets one of her agents to log into Kitty's website and they use Hodges' name to log in the site. Avery shows them that Kitty is just a chat bot.

In his office, Avery talks to D.B. about the case and requests Finlay to assist her to review the computer. Avery manages to retrieve the data from Berman's computer and they learn that there was a two-way camera on the computer. Avery and Finlay conclude that Berman unknowingly made a sex tape. Avery notices Kitty massaging her jaw and investigates further.

In the morgue, David Phillips (David Berman) gives D.B. a bullet. while Robbins is performing the autopsy.

Morgan Brody (Elisabeth Harnois) tells D.B. that the bullet found doesn't match Berman's bullets. Berman is then released from custody and he walks past the police station reception and sees a woman (also DeVitto) who is identical to Kitty. Avery explains to the woman (whose name is Susan) that she is a person of interest. Susan tells Avery that she is on Friend Agenda. Avery notes to Susan that she has an "idiosyncratic medical condition".

Avery and Susan work out that Susan's top hit on her profile is the one who created Kitty. Meanwhile, Ecklie tells Berman to stay at the hotel where he learns that Berman doesn't have a dog so Nick takes the dog to Hodges while Greg is briefing how the killer knew the house. The three learn that the killer got a dog to fool the security at the house.

Brass finds the car rented by the killer and he and Nick go to the car where it was empty as a plane flies overhead they realize the killer has fled the country. Nick takes the evidence back to the office and briefs D.B. and Avery. There was a video of the murder where Avery realizes that her suspect was never in Las Vegas.

Avery and Nick look at Nebula1's (Cheyenne Jackson) first profile picture, and learn that he is agoraphobic and orders in a lot. They then learn that he is in St Louis due to them being able to make out the Gateway Arch in the background. When FBI agents raid his house they find computers with Kitty on them all and then Avery realizes it is a trap and they lose all evidence.

Avery organises a press conference where Susan tells her story. After the conference Avery is informed that Nebula1 has crashed Susan's profile.

In San Diego, Avery confronts Nebula1, he then attacks Avery and cuts her with his knife. Avery says her code word and he is then arrested.

At the end, Avery arranges for Susan's husband to come home. As she is leaving Avery tells D.B. about a bank robbery of three cents from 80 million chequing accounts.

== Production ==
This episode launched the fourth CSI series, CSI: Cyber. It is written by the creators of CSI: Miami and CSI: NY, and marks the first appearance of Patricia Arquette as Dr Avery Ryan.

== Home media ==
This episode was included in the Season 14 DVD.

This episode is also included in CSI: Cyber's season 1 DVD boxset.

== Reception ==
The episode had 9.95 million viewers. CBS confirmed that the episode also broke the Guinness World Record for largest TV simulcast drama episode, airing in 171 countries, including digital streaming on CBS All Access.
