= CSI: Crime Scene Investigation season 11 =

American TV show season

CSI: Crime Scene Investigation
- Season 11
- Season 11 U.S. DVD cover
- Starring: Laurence Fishburne; Marg Helgenberger; George Eads; Jorja Fox; Eric Szmanda; Robert David Hall; Wallace Langham; David Berman; Paul Guilfoyle
- No. of episodes: 22

Release
- Original network: CBS
- Original release: September 23, 2010 – May 12, 2011

Season chronology
- ← Previous; Season 10 Next → Season 12

The eleventh season of CSI: Crime Scene Investigation premiered on CBS on September 23, 2010, and ended May 12, 2011. The season stars Marg Helgenberger and Laurence Fishburne.

== Plot ==
Langston fights for his life ("Shockwaves") as Catherine meets a man from her past ("Pool Shark"), in the eleventh season of CSI. Willows and her team face both personal and professional demons this season, as they investigate cases including a decapitation ("Blood Moon"), the knife attack of a Vegas icon ("Sqweegel"), a woman with a hoarding condition ("House of Hoarders"), a T-Rex attack ("Cold Blooded"), a human shredding ("Bump & Grind"), a death connected to fracking ("Fracked"), a murder committed by a cat and a parrot ("Wild Life"), a body in a bin ("Man Up"), and the death of an FBI Agent ("418/427"). Meanwhile, Greg tries to romance a burlesque dancer ("A Kiss Before Frying"), Sara comes face-to-face with her mother-in-law ("The Two Mrs. Grissoms"), Ray's wife comes to Vegas ("All That Cremains"), Nick is forced to shoot and kill a suspect ("Targets of Obsession"), Sofia returns to the CSI team ("Father of the Bride"), and Catherine loses control of her team in Los Angeles ("Cello and Goodbye").

== Cast ==
=== Main ===
- Laurence Fishburne as Raymond Langston, a CSI Level 2
- Marg Helgenberger as Catherine Willows, a CSI Level 3 Supervisor
- George Eads as Nick Stokes, a CSI Level 3 Assistant Supervisor
- Jorja Fox as Sara Sidle, a CSI Level 3
- Eric Szmanda as Greg Sanders, a CSI Level 3
- Robert David Hall as Al Robbins, the Chief Medical Examiner
- Wallace Langham as David Hodges, a Trace Technician
- David Berman as David Phillips, an Assistant Medical Examiner
- Paul Guilfoyle as Jim Brass, a Homicide Detective Captain

=== Recurring ===
- Jon Wellner as Henry Andrews
- Archie Kao as Archie Johnson
- Katee Sackhoff as Frankie Reed
- Marc Vann as Conrad Ecklie
- Alex Carter as Lou Vartann
- Bill Irwin as Nate Haskell

=== Guest stars ===
- Liz Vassey as Wendy Simms
- William Petersen as Gil Grissom
- Melinda Clarke as Heather Kessler
- Louise Lombard as Sofia Curtis
- Elisabeth Harnois as Morgan Brody
- Method Man as Drops
- Ann-Margret as Margot Wilson
- Dita Von Teese as Ellen Whitebridge
- Justin Bieber as Jason McCann

=== Changes ===
Liz Vassey departs the cast in episode two of the season, while Jorja Fox rejoins the regular cast in the season premiere. Laurence Fishburne departs at the season's end. Former cast members William Petersen and Louise Lombard guest star. Elisabeth Harnois makes her series debut.

== Episodes ==
No. overall	No. in season	Title	Directed by	Written by	Original release date	US viewers (millions)
230	1	"Shockwaves"	Alec Smight	David Weddle & Bradley Thompson	September 23, 2010	14.69
Ray Langston fights for his life after being stabbed by psychopath Nate Haskell, (Note: Bill Irwin as Nate Haskell) after he helped Ray and the CSIs crack the case of Dr. Jekyll. But while recovering, Ray remotely works from the hospital on his next case. CSIs try to catch an anti-government bomber who is responsible for a series of explosions at a funeral for Officer Clark who was killed by Dr. Jekyll (after events in "Meat Jekyll"). Young activist Jason McCann (Note: Justin Bieber as Jason McCann) may hold a vital clue to the bomber's identity.
231	2	"Pool Shark"	Michael Nankin	Dustin Lee Abraham	September 30, 2010	13.41
A woman is attacked by a shark inside the pool at a day club at the Golden Nugget Casino. Initial suspects include ex-con "Drops", (Note: Method Man as Drops) jewelry thief Anya Sanchez, (Note: Alicia Lagano as Anya Sanchez) and the Golden Nugget's owner Earnest Boozell, (Note: Elliott Gould as Earnest Boozell) who suspects that rival club owner Danny Macklin (Note: Sasha Roiz as Danny Macklin) arranged the murder to draw customers to his own casino. Boozel is upset when he discovers Catherine is investigating the case, as he and her father, the late Sam Braun, were rivals. Later, a scuba diver, revealed to be the aquatic veterinarian Dr. Holloway, (Note: Chris Gartin as Dr. Holloway) is found dead of carbon monoxide poisoning in the aquarium. Catherine suspects both cases are related. Wendy resigns from the CSI lab to take a similar position in Portland, Oregon, saving her goodbyes to Hodges for last.
232	3	"Blood Moon"	Brad Tanenbaum	Treena Hancock & Melissa R. Byer	October 7, 2010	12.50
After the CSIs discovers a member of the Vampire Cult found tied to a fence with multiple slash wounds and his dismembered head on a pike, Ray and Nick plunge into a world of creeds and a legendary rivalry between vampires and werewolves, as they investigate whether or not mythological bigotry was involved. At a hotel convention, an armory dealer (Note: Andy Dick as Armory Dealer) provides a clue to the type of weapon used to behead the victim.
233	4	"Sqweegel"	Jeffrey Hunt	Story by : Anthony E. Zuiker (Television Story); Anthony E. Zuiker and Duane Swierczynski (based on "Dark Origins"); Teleplay by : Anthony E. Zuiker & Carol Mendelsohn	October 14, 2010	14.45
Based on the first Level 26 novel, Dark Origins, (Note: Dark Origins is a novel, co-written by Anthony E. Zuiker and Duane Swierczynski) Sqweegel is the forensic-proof serial killer who kills people who have secrets and tries to get them to confess to something they have done in order to stay alive. One of the victims includes socialite Margot Wilton, (Note: Ann-Margret as Margot Wilton) who for many years has hidden her dark secret related to her deceased son. Margot's lawyer Oscar Goodman prevents the CSIs from questioning Margot, and from entry to her house just as the killer strikes against her a second time. Although the final attack is averted, Sqweegel escapes and the case remains unsolved.
234	5	"House of Hoarders"	Alec Smight	Christopher Barbour	October 21, 2010	14.96
Nick and Sara investigate a decomposed body in a house of a hoarder. However, they soon discover that its occupants have hoarded four more dead bodies over the years.
235	6	"Cold Blooded"	Louis Shaw Milito	Tom Mularz	October 28, 2010	14.27
A body of a college student is found in the desert and appears to have been punctured by dinosaur teeth, which leads the team to the animatronic T-rex in the touring Walking with Dinosaurs − The Arena Spectacular live production. Meanwhile, the shooting of a business man leads the CSIs to two teen murders that happened five years ago, and a ransom situation surrounding the whereabouts of their remains.
236	7	"Bump & Grind"	Michael Nankin	Don McGill	November 4, 2010	13.96
The CSIs try put a body back together, after it is literally shredded in an industrial shredder. As they gather up the "parts", they discover that the victim's last meal consisted of a unique clam chowder, containing clams, carrots, celery and a human ear, with chopped credit cards as garnish. The "garnish" is found to have been obtained fraudulently in the name of a Las Vegas businessman, who operates an anti-fraud service. Also, Ray receives a kidney bean and a "thinking of you" letter from Nate Haskell, stirring up hard feelings for Ray after the attack.
237	8	"Fracked"	Martha Coolidge	Bradley Thompson & David Weddle	November 11, 2010	13.00
A young couple swimming in a local pond notice an awful stench coming out of the water, just before discovering a dead body float up. The victim is one of several sources for a newspaper article of fracking and illegal natural gas dumping. Another suspect is burned to death after flicking a lit cigarette into a well, due to the water being infused with methane. The murderer is later found dead, a victim of a hit and run, and they are unable to find who did it, forcing the team to leave the case unsolved. The reporter writing the article remains adamant on publishing her findings, despite her sources having all died.
238	9	"Wild Life"	Charles Haid	Melissa R. Byer & Treena Hancock	November 18, 2010	14.15
Ray, Catherine, and Nick try to figure out if it was murder or suicide when a man is found dead after falling from an upper floor of the Eclipse hotel; two young women, who were looking for "eligible bachelors", are the witnesses, but also the suspects. Across town, Sara and Greg investigate a case where an elderly woman falls through her table and her husband lies dead in the shower; the only two witnesses to the crime are an uncooperative cat and a parrot who appears to be unable to talk.
239	10	"418/427"	Frank Waldeck	Michael Frost Beckner	December 9, 2010	13.17
The wife of an FBI agent is murdered at a local supermarket, and her kids have disappeared. The agent has been chasing a serial pedophile, who is suspected of kidnapping his children, and he clashes with Brass who prefers not to get ahead of the evidence.
240	11	"Man Up"	Alec Smight	Michael F.X. Daley	January 6, 2011	14.22
A prostitute is found dead at the same site where a staged photo of the same woman was taken and posted on a website days earlier, as part of an unusual "bucket list" for a trio of college alumni, which also includes the kidnapping of Carrot Top. Hodges suspects that his Triumph motorcycle that he recently bought was built with spare parts at a junkyard - one of them from a bizarre deadly crash involving a motorcyclist and two buses.
241	12	"A Kiss Before Frying"	Brad Tanenbaum	Evan Dunsky	January 20, 2011	14.34
While the team searches for a serial killer who murders his victims with an electric chair, Greg falls for classic film noir femme fatale burlesque dancer Rita Von Squeeze (aka Ellen Whitebridge) (Note: Dita Von Teese as Ellen Whitebridge / Agnes) who may be connected not only to this case, but also to the 1946 murder of songbird Agnes LaPlouffe and a mob hit orchestrated by Bugsy Siegel.
242	13	"The Two Mrs. Grissoms"	Steven Felder	Story by : Christopher Barbour; Teleplay by : Treena Hancock & Melissa R. Byer	February 3, 2011	13.98
A night full of celebration ends with a bang when Dr. Lambert (Note: Anthony Natale as Dr. Lambert) the director of a scholarship foundation for the deaf is killed by a deadly car bomb, prompting Sara to interrogate deaf college students and faculty including Professor Julia Holden, (Note: Marlee Matlin as Professor Julia Holden) Gil Grissom's former lover. Sara's mother-in-law Mrs. Betty Grissom (Note: Phyllis Frelich as Mrs. Betty Grissom) has a grudge against Sara, due to her not being with her son Gil (Note: William Petersen as Gil Grissom in a cameo appearance) while on an expedition in Peru.
243	14	"All That Cremains"	Jeffrey Hunt	Dustin Lee Abraham	February 10, 2011	12.64
When a couple of elderly ladies discover a dismembered body amongst the donations at a thrift shop, the CSIs investigate the gruesome murder of a high-powered, widowed lawyer. Meanwhile, Ray faces the fact that it is time to move on from his old life when his ex-wife Gloria Parkes (Note: Tracee Ellis Ross as Gloria Parkes) comes to Vegas.
244	15	"Targets of Obsession"	Alec Smight	David Weddle & Bradley Thompson	February 17, 2011	13.29
While Langston testifies against Nate Haskell, Nick is warned that he is in danger, after discovering that his front gate is rigged with an anti-personnel mine, but the caller cannot tell him who or why without putting himself in even more danger. Later, Catherine, Vartann and Nick are trapped in a rigged warehouse, with only 15 minutes to defuse the bomb amidst a series of triggers, without the assistance of the bomb squad or other officers. At trial, Haskell represents himself pro se, questioning first Langston, then his psychiatrist Dr. Corey (Note: Robert Pine as Dr. Corey) who testifies that Haskell cannot be held responsible for his actions due to a genetic MAO-A brain defect. After discovering that the warehouse bomb was set by Jason McCann, LVPD sets up a road block for his escaping van. In the stand-off that ensues, McCann is killed. Following his guilty verdict, Haskell escapes from the holding cell with the help of his female fan club.
245	16	"Turn On, Tune In, Drop Dead"	Paul McCrane	Tom Mularz	February 24, 2011	12.41
As Ray and Brass are still scratching their heads figuring out how Nate Haskell managed to escape police custody following his trial, a "corpse" that Phillips was prepping for autopsy wakes up and walks out of the morgue. The CSIs suspect that his "death" was a result of drugs he was administered as part of a psychoactive drug study conceived by Dr. Aden. (Note: Howard Hesseman as Dr. Aden) The CSIs identify two other people who must get help before it's too late.
246	17	"The List"	Louis Shaw Milito	Richard Catalani	March 10, 2011	13.39
Following a prison riot, the team investigates the murder of a cop, Vance, who was incarcerated for murdering his wife, but believed he was framed. During a cell search, Nick also uncovers a notebook with a list of names - with a lot of familiar names, including Brass - that Vance felt included the true responsible party.
247	18	"Hitting for the Cycle"	Alec Smight	Daniel Steck & Richard Catalani	March 31, 2011	12.76
In the world of CSIs, "the cycle" consists of a homicide, a suicide, an accidental death, and a death by natural causes in a single shift. When the first three happen, the CSIs compete to complete the cycle by finding a death by natural causes. Cases include a gamer who is found to have died while playing an online game, and a man found dead in his pool following a burglary. They must also deal with a new morgue employee from Los Angeles, who makes a habit out of cracking wisecracks with his sarcastic tone, to the irritation of his co-workers.
248	19	"Unleashed"	Brad Tanenbaum	Ed Whitmore & Anthony E. Zuiker	April 7, 2011	13.06
Ray and Sara visit Grissom's friend, "Lady Heather", to solve a strange case involving a woman dressed like a cat who is mauled to death in the backcountry by a mountain lion. Meanwhile, Nick and Robbins deliver a baby through an emergency Caesarean section, after its 17-year-old mother died after hanging herself; Nick and Brass investigate after determining that she died as a victim of severe cyberbullying. Later, Lady Heather gives a word of advice to Ray about Nate Haskell, suggesting that being a "good doctor" won't lead to his capture.
249	20	"Father of the Bride"	Frank Waldeck	Evan Dunsky	April 28, 2011	10.84
As the notorious Nate Haskell sends a threatening video to the father of one of his brides threatening to kill her, the CSI team must catch him. Sofia Curtis returns to help out, recently promoted to Deputy Chief.
250	21	"Cello and Goodbye"	Alec Smight	Christopher Barbour & Don McGill	May 5, 2011	10.67
In Los Angeles, Ray's ex-wife Gloria Parkes (Note: Tracee Ellis Ross as Gloria Parkes) is kidnapped and Haskell leaves a message written in blood drawing the CSI team to Los Angeles. While the LAPD (where Conrad Ecklie's daughter, Morgan Brody, works in its SID division) is less than happy that another jurisdiction is interfering in their case, Nick finds himself arrested while pursuing Haskell with Ray, who went rogue earlier to go on the hunt for Haskell.
251	22	"In a Dark, Dark House"	Jeffrey Hunt	Tom Mularz	May 12, 2011	11.77
Ray has tracked Haskell back to his childhood house in Nessus, Nevada. Desperate to save his ex-wife Gloria before it is too late, Ray prepares to settle his score with the notorious "Dick & Jane Killer" once-and-for-all, leading to Haskell's violent death. Brass and the CSIs would not only determine if Ray's killing of Haskell was "self defense or murder", but also uncover more on the creation of Haskell's psychotic persona.

== U.S. Nielsen Ratings ==
Ep. #	Episode title	Air date	Rating	Share	18–49	Viewers
1	Shockwaves (Part 3)	September 23, 2010	9.0	14	3.4/9	14.69 million
2	Pool Shark	September 30, 2010	8.3	13	3.1/8	13.41 million
3	Blood Moon	October 7, 2010	7.8	12	2.7/7	12.50 million
4	Sqweegel	October 14, 2010	8.9	14	3.1/8	14.45 million
5	House of Hoarders	October 21, 2010	9.0	14	3.4/9	14.96 million
6	Cold Blooded	October 28, 2010	8.5	14	3.3/9	14.27 million
7	Bump & Grind	November 4, 2010	8.6	14	3.3/9	13.96 million
8	Fracked	November 11, 2010	8.1	13	2.8/8	12.99 million
9	Wild Life	November 18, 2010	8.5	14	3.1/8	14.15 million
10	418/427	December 9, 2010	7.9	13	3.0/8	13.17 million
11	Man Up	January 6, 2011	8.6	14	3.3/9	14.22 million
12	A Kiss Before Frying	January 20, 2011	8.5	13	3.1/8	14.34 million
13	The Two Mrs. Grissoms	February 3, 2011	8.4	13	3.0/8	13.98 million
14	All That Cremains	February 10, 2011	7.8	12	2.8/7	12.64 million
15	Targets of Obsession	February 17, 2011	8.1	13	2.9/8	13.29 million
16	Turn On, Tune In, Drop Dead	February 24, 2011	7.6	12	2.7/7	12.41 million
17	The List	March 10, 2011	8.4	14	3.0/9	13.39 million
18	Hitting for the Cycle	March 31, 2011	7.9	12	2.9/8	12.76 million
19	Unleashed	April 7, 2011	8.2	13	2.9/8	13.06 million
20	Father of the Bride (Part 1)	April 28, 2011	6.8	10	2.4/6	10.84 million
21	Cello and Goodbye (Part 2)	May 5, 2011	6.7	11	2.3/6	10.67 million
22	In a Dark, Dark House (Part 3)	May 12, 2011	7.2	11	2.6/7	11.77 million
