= Immortality (CSI: Crime Scene Investigation) =

Two-hour series finale of CSI: Crime Scene Investigation

- CSI: Crime Scene Investigation episodes
- DVD cover of the episode
- Episode nos.: Season Series finale Episodes 1 & 2
- Directed by: Louis Shaw Milito
- Written by: Anthony E. Zuiker
- Production codes: 1601 and 1602
- Original air date: September 27, 2015

Episode chronology
← Previous "The End Game"	Next → CSI: Vegas

"Immortality" is the two-hour series finale of the American procedural crime drama television series CSI: Crime Scene Investigation. It was written by series creator Anthony E. Zuiker and directed by Louis Shaw Milito and originally aired in the United States on CBS on September 27, 2015.

== Plot ==
When a suicide bomber detonates his vest on the floor of the Eclipse casino, FBI special agent Catherine Willows returns from Los Angeles to join the investigation. Gil Grissom, meanwhile, working to preserve sharks in international waters, is arrested for trespassing at the Port of San Diego, and D.B. Russell offers Sara Sidle the chance to supervise the local investigation into the bombing. Sidle, who is vying for the position of director of the Las Vegas Crime Lab, is initially irked when Sheriff Conrad Ecklie inquires about Grissom's location when "Lady" Heather Kessler is linked to the crime. Ecklie ensures Grissom is released from custody, and Willows and he, alongside Eclipse security officer Jim Brass, assist in locating the suspect.

As the team works to restore safety to the streets of Las Vegas, Russell decides it is time for him to "head East" and pursue new challenges, while he places a plaque, dedicated to the memory of Julie Finlay, alongside his personal possessions. Willows expresses an interest in leaving the FBI and working alongside her daughter Lindsey in the Las Vegas Crime Lab, noting that, should Sidle reject the promotion she is going to be offered, Willows will accept it in lieu of her former colleague. The series ends with the newly promoted Sidle, upon hearing a recording of Grissom confessing his love for her, sailing from the Port of San Diego with Grissom.

== Deleted scenes ==
Off-screen, Sidle resigns, and Willows is hired as lab director. Scenes were filmed to explicitly depict the transition, although they were cut from the aired episode. A second scene, featuring Willows and her daughter, was also deleted; in it, Willows informs Lindsey that she should only resign if she does not feel like "King Kong on cocaine" following her first arrest, repeating the pep talk she gave Holly Gribbs in the pilot. She then informs Lindsey that Gribbs was killed in the line of duty. A third deleted scene shows Russell visiting Finlay's grave.

== Cast ==
- Ted Danson as D.B. Russell, a CSI level 3 supervisor and the lab director
- Jorja Fox as Sara Sidle, a CSI level 3
- Eric Szmanda as Greg Sanders, a CSI level 3
- Robert David Hall as Al Robbins, the chief medical examiner
- Wallace Langham as David Hodges, a trace technician
- David Berman as David Phillips, an assistant medical examiner
- Elisabeth Harnois as Morgan Brody, a CSI level 3
- Jon Wellner as Henry Andrews, a DNA and toxicology technician
- William Petersen as Gil Grissom
- Marg Helgenberger as Catherine Willows
- Paul Guilfoyle as Jim Brass
- Melinda Clarke as Heather Kessler
- Katie Stevens as Lindsey Willows
- Marc Vann as Conrad Ecklie
- Michael Beach as Officer Scinta
- Larry M. Mitchell as Officer Mitchell

== Production ==
The finale was shot over 17 days. Filming for the principal cast began on July 29, 2015, and production wrapped on August 21, 2015. The finale was filmed with the option to be broadcast as two episodes under the titles "Immortality Part I" and "Immortality Part II", respectively. The production codes for the episodes are 1601 and 1602.

=== Casting ===
During the CBS 2015 Upfront, Les Moonves and Nina Tassler announced that former lead actors Marg Helgenberger and William Petersen would reprise their roles as Catherine Willows and Gil Grissom, respectively. Ted Danson, who starred in the series since the beginning of the 12th season, also returned as D.B. Russell. On July 24, 2015, it was confirmed that both George Eads, who played Nick Stokes for 15 seasons, and Elisabeth Shue, who played the lead role of Julie Finlay for four seasons, had declined options to return. Elisabeth Harnois, Jorja Fox, Eric Szmanda, Robert David Hall, Wallace Langham, David Berman, and Jon Wellner all reprised their roles, as did Paul Guilfoyle; Szmanda is the only cast member to have been with the entire series from the pilot to Immortality.

Melinda Clarke, who appeared as Lady Heather Kessler, a long-time friend of Grissom, also returned. Katie Stevens was cast as Lindsey Willows, Catherine's daughter, a CSI level 1. Recurring guest star Marc Vann also returned as Sheriff Conrad Ecklie, as did Larry Mitchell as Officer Mitchell.

=== Production credits ===
The episodes were directed by Louis Shaw Milito, and written by series creator Anthony E. Zuiker. William Petersen assisted in the breaking of the story. Like the series, the finale used "Who Are You" by The Who as the opening and closing theme. Executive producers included Ann Donahue, Carol Mendelsohn, Anthony E. Zuiker, Jerry Bruckheimer, William Petersen, and Cynthia Chvatal. The episodes were produced by CBS Television Studios, distributed by CBS Television Distribution, and broadcast on CBS. The film's run-time was 88 minutes.

== Continuation ==
Following the end of the series, Ted Danson joined the cast of CSI: Cyber in his role as D.B. Russell. This relocation was alluded to in the movie, with Russell announcing his intention to "head east". Elisabeth Shue's Julie Finlay was featured prominently in archive footage during the Cyber episode "Hack ER".

== Reception ==
=== Ratings ===
According to Nielsen Media Research, the episode was watched by 12.22 million household viewers and received a 1.8 rating in the 18–49 demographics, becoming so the most-watched, and highest-rated, show in its time slot.

=== Critical reviews ===
Upon reviewing the series finale, Gavin Hetherington of SpoilerTV named the episodes "the perfect send-off for such an epic show". He later called the episode a "dream come true" for fans of the series with the reunion of Gil, Catherine, and Sara.
