= CSI: Crime Scene Investigation season 6 =

American TV show season

CSI: Crime Scene Investigation
- Season 6
- Season 6 U.S. DVD cover
- Starring: William Petersen; Marg Helgenberger; Gary Dourdan; George Eads; Jorja Fox; Eric Szmanda; Robert David Hall; Paul Guilfoyle
- No. of episodes: 24

Release
- Original network: CBS
- Original release: September 22, 2005 – May 18, 2006

Season chronology
- ← Previous; Season 5 Next → Season 7

The sixth season of CSI: Crime Scene Investigation premiered on CBS on September 22, 2005, and ended May 18, 2006. The series stars William Petersen and Marg Helgenberger.

== Plot ==
Brass, now partnered with Sofia Curtis, finds himself caught in a shootout that leaves one officer dead, and a Latino community enraged ("A Bullet Runs Through It"), before finding himself critically injured in a hostage standoff ("Bang-Bang"), in the sixth season of CSI. Meanwhile, Grissom and Willows reunite in order to investigate their toughest cases yet, including the death of a movie star ("Room Service"), a corpse discovered at a suburban home ("Bite Me"), a mass suicide at a cult ("Shooting Stars"), and an apparent suicide ("Secrets and Flies"), as Nick comes to terms with his PTSD ("Bodies in Motion"), and later tracks down a missing child ("Gum Drops"). Also this season, Nick hunts the head of a civil war reenactor ("Way to Go"), Grissom investigates the death of a psychic ("Spellbound"), and Sara comes face to face with her toughest adversary yet ("The Unusual Suspect").

In the episode Rashomama, the story is told in flashbacks by different narrations of involved characters and witnesses, a reference to the Japanese film Rashomon.

== Cast ==
=== Main cast ===
- William Petersen as Gil Grissom, a CSI Level 3 Supervisor
- Marg Helgenberger as Catherine Willows, a CSI Level 3 Assistant Supervisor
- Gary Dourdan as Warrick Brown, a CSI Level 3
- George Eads as Nick Stokes, a CSI Level 3
- Jorja Fox as Sara Sidle, a CSI Level 3
- Eric Szmanda as Greg Sanders, a CSI Level 1
- Robert David Hall as Al Robbins, the Chief Medical Examiner
- Paul Guilfoyle as Jim Brass, a Homicide Detective Captain

=== Recurring cast ===
- Archie Kao as Archie Johnson
- David Berman as David Phillips
- Wallace Langham as David Hodges
- Liz Vassey as Wendy Simms
- Louise Lombard as Sofia Curtis
- Conor O'Farrell as Jeffrey McKeen

== Episodes ==
No. overall	No. in season	Title	Directed by	Written by	Original release date	US viewers (millions)
118	1	"Bodies in Motion"	Richard J. Lewis	Story by : Naren Shankar & Carol Mendelsohn; Teleplay by : Naren Shankar	September 22, 2005	29.02
Reunited as a single team under Grissom following the events of the previous episode, the team tackles three separate cases: Grissom and Nick investigate the case of a murdered couple found in bed in a trailer at a suspicious gas main explosion; Catherine and Warrick look into the death of a stripper discovered dead in the worst part of town; and Greg and Sara try to find the killer of two bodies found decomposed after spending five days in the trunk of a car. Meanwhile, Grissom determines there was an accomplice in Nick's kidnapping when he receives the cassette that was in Nick's glass coffin.
119	2	"Room Service"	Kenneth Fink	Dustin Lee Abraham & Henry Alonso Myers	September 29, 2005	28.00
Nick and Warrick investigate the suspicious murder of a young movie star who is found dead after a night of partying in his hotel suite. Meanwhile, Grissom, Catherine, and Sara uncover two murders: an immigrant laundry worker from the same hotel, and the cabbie who took him home. (First appearance of police officer Larry Mitchell (played by Larry Mitchell).)
120	3	"Bite Me"	Jeffrey Hunt	Story by : Josh Berman & Carol Mendelsohn; Teleplay by : Josh Berman	October 6, 2005	28.85
The CSI team investigates the case of a woman found dead on the staircase of her suburban home. Suspicion quickly falls on the victim's husband, but the blood-spattered evidence and the bite marks on his body tell a complicated story.
121	4	"Shooting Stars"	Danny Cannon	Danny Cannon	October 13, 2005	28.34
The CSIs are called in when a homeowner finds a disheveled group of teenagers dumping a body in his yard, while one of them broke in to look for food, and another was found dead outside. It is soon discovered that the group is a cult, but when Grissom and Catherine find the cult's headquarters at an old bomb shelter in the middle of the desert, they find the members all dead from what appears to be a mass suicide. As the team investigates further, they find out that the mass "suicide" was designed to have been a scam, but rigged by his partner to be a mass murder instead.
122	5	"Gum Drops"	Richard J. Lewis	Sarah Goldfinger	October 20, 2005	28.48
The CSIs are called to a house in which the inhabitants, a family of four, have gone missing, and large pools of blood cover parts of the floor. Murder is immediately suspected, but without any bodies, it is difficult for the team to ascertain what happened. Amongst the clues included a trail of Bubblicious bubble gum, leading to speculation that one of its victims was a little girl, with the possibility that she may still be alive. Absent:William Petersen (Gil Grissom) & Paul Guilfoyle (Jim Brass).
123	6	"Secrets and Flies"	Terrence O'Hara	Josh Berman	November 3, 2005	28.73
When a young mother is found dead in what appears to be a suicide, the CSIs find evidence to the contrary, thus opening up a homicide investigation regarding a surrogate motherhood arrangement gone bad. Meanwhile, Grissom, under pressure from the Sheriff and Ecklie, must disprove the evidence presented by a corrupt entomologist in court.
124	7	"A Bullet Runs Through It, Part 1"	Danny Cannon	Richard Catalani & Carol Mendelsohn	November 10, 2005	29.55
The team must investigate the death of a police officer who died during a shootout, leaving hundreds of bullets at the crime scene. The case grows controversial when it turns out that Sofia Curtis and Jim Brass were with the victim during the shootout, especially when it turns out the officer died from friendly fire. The team, as well as the police department, also contend with the city's enraged Latino community when a young boy is found shot and in critical condition along the path of a fleeing suspect from the shootout. (Guest starred A Martinez.)
125	8	"A Bullet Runs Through It, Part 2"	Kenneth Fink	Richard Catalani & Carol Mendelsohn	November 17, 2005	29.00
The CSI's continue to sift through the overwhelming evidence from the shootout in order to determine who is responsible for the death of a police officer killed during the incident. The team also looks into what started the shootout to begin with. They must also prove that the young boy found injured near the shootout was not shot by police, but by the fleeing suspect. (Guest starred A Martinez.)
126	9	"Dog Eat Dog"	Duane Clark	Dustin Lee Abraham & Allen MacDonald	November 24, 2005	25.72
On Thanksgiving Day, Grissom and Catherine investigate the death of a man found in a dumpster of a local restaurant, who is found to have had a severe eating disorder related to Prader–Willi syndrome; they examine ties with a competitive eating tournament, in which he placed third in a hot dog eating contest before his death. Meanwhile, Nick and Sara investigate the death of a couple of the brink of a bitter divorce, in which evidence seems to point to the couple's dog.
127	10	"Still Life"	Richard J. Lewis	David Rambo	December 8, 2005	30.95
The CSI team is called to help when Karen Mathews reports her son, Jesse, missing from a playground where he was playing on the swings. Witnesses report seeing a man with a blue baseball cap near the swings. Clues in the park bathroom include blood and the boy's underpants. The boy is eventually found in a store, accompanied by a woman with a man fitting the earlier description. But the couple with the boy claim that he is their son Adam, while Karen insists he is her missing son. Absent:Robert David Hall (Dr. Al Robbins)
128	11	"Werewolves"	Kenneth Fink	Josh Berman	January 5, 2006	27.23
The team takes on a poignant case as they investigate the death of a man with a condition in which he grows excessive body hair. They soon discover the man had a twin sister who, along with their mother, is mysteriously missing.
129	12	"Daddy's Little Girl"	Terrence O'Hara	Story by : Sarah Goldfinger & Naren Shankar; Teleplay by : Sarah Goldfinger & Henry Alonso Myers	January 19, 2006	27.13
The CSIs investigate the stabbing of a motocross racer who was about to leave town with a woman he had been living with, which would unravel a love triangle with a technician for the telephone company. Meanwhile, Catherine and Nick investigate the death of an accountant hit by her own car. Also: Nick confronts Grissom for the truth about his kidnapping when he listens and examines the recording on the cassette, which would also reveal a possible connection with the accountant's death.
130	13	"Kiss-Kiss, Bye-Bye"	Danny Cannon	David Rambo	January 26, 2006	25.86
The CSIs question the city's crème de la crème at a party to discover who killed a young man. As Catherine's father Sam Braun is once again a suspect, personal conflict grows between the two. (Guest stars Faye Dunaway.)
131	14	"Killer"	Kenneth Fink	Story by : Erik Saltzgaber; Teleplay by : Naren Shankar & Dustin Lee Abraham	February 2, 2006	28.37
The CSI investigate two murders in the same area: a man killed in a shady motel, and a teenage girl killed in a car accident, but after getting out of her vehicle, killed by being strangled to death. The killer's story is also followed as his family try to live a normal life, oblivious to his actions.
132	15	"Pirates of the Third Reich"	Richard J. Lewis	Jerry Stahl	February 9, 2006	27.42
A half-naked woman is found half buried in the desert with a branding on her arm. She has no hair and is missing her right hand. The woman turns out to be Lady Heather's estranged daughter. The autopsy reveals that the woman was a victim of an experiment and starved to death. They also investigate a homeless "pirate" who had lost an eye and had a lobotomy. Both cases had ties to the Betz Clinic, where the deceased woman underwent a sleep therapy session for her insomnia.
133	16	"Up in Smoke"	Duane Clark	Josh Berman	March 2, 2006	27.81
When a body is found badly burned in a chimney, Catherine and Warrick recall the house's owner as a suspect in an unsolved murder case a year earlier. Against protocol, the two then use the investigation of the burned victim as an excuse to re-open their case and inspect the house.
134	17	"I Like to Watch"	Kenneth Fink	Henry Alonso Myers & Richard Catalani	March 9, 2006	27.16
The team is followed by a reality TV crew as it investigates the vicious rape of a real estate agent. Thanks to a video surveillance system, suspicion falls on someone taped entering the building and leaving flowers at the victims door, but forensics clears him. Suspicion then falls on the possibility that the perpetrator is a fireman, uncovering a bizarre fetish crime.
135	18	"The Unusual Suspect"	Alec Smight	Allen MacDonald	March 30, 2006	25.23
A teenage boy, Marlon, is being prosecuted for a murder of Stacey, one of his female classmates. During his trial, his 12-year-old sister Hannah takes the stand, and admits that she herself murdered Stacey. The CSI team is now faced with a strange dilemma - two confessions for the one murder. As Hannah is a genius, in high school already, some CSI members suspect that she could not have physically committed the murder. Absent: William Petersen (Gil Grissom, Paul Guilfoyle (Jim Brass) & Eric Szmanda (Greg Sanders).
136	19	"Spellbound"	Jeffrey Hunt	Jacqueline Hoyt	April 6, 2006	23.33
When a psychic is found dead in her own shop, the available evidence leads Greg to believe she foresaw her own death. Greg also reveals that his grandmother was a psychic, but Grissom resolves to use his scientific methods to find out what happened. Meanwhile, retired Detective Packey Jameson, an old friend of Brass, suspects the case is linked to an unsolved murder he worked on years ago, and persuades the CSIs to help him revive his old case. Absent: George Eads (Nick Stokes) & Jorja Fox (Sarah Sidle).
137	20	"Poppin' Tags"	Bryan Spicer	Dustin Lee Abraham	April 13, 2006	24.43
The CSI team is led into the rap music world as they investigate the murders of three street team members who were shot while putting up posters for a rap artist. Guest starred Method Man in his first appearance as Drops. Also guest starred Obie Trice.
138	21	"Rashomama"	Kenneth Fink	Sarah Goldfinger	April 27, 2006	27.37
A wealthy but disagreeable prosecutor is murdered at her son's wedding, and the CSI are called in to investigate. However, Nick's car is stolen with all the evidence inside it, and the case becomes compromised, to the chagrin of Undersheriff McKeen. In a nod to Rashomon, the CSIs must think back to their investigations as well as search for new evidence to find the killer. (Guest starred Veronica Cartwright.)
139	22	"Time of Your Death"	Dean White	Story by : Danny Cannon; Teleplay by : David Rambo & Richard Catalani	May 4, 2006	26.05
The team investigates the death of a man with a designer suit and the keys to a Ferrari, found dumped in a back alley. Their search leads them to believe he went down fighting and was dragged through a hall with wet paint on the walls. Eventually, they are led to a service in Las Vegas that orchestrates the 'perfect weekend' for an unsuspecting target by uncovering their fantasies and hiring actors to start and play a part in those fantasies. (Guest starred Judd Nelson.)
140	23	"Bang-Bang"	Terrence O'Hara	Anthony E. Zuiker & Naren Shankar	May 11, 2006	27.04
The CSIs strongly suspect a man in the death of his wife and his co-workers, but are not sure if he did it, especially by himself or with an accomplice. The suspect then leads the police on a wild ride through a busy casino, shooting a guard, taking a hostage and barricading himself into a hotel room. Jim Brass then steps in as a hostage negotiator, but is shot as the police raid the room.
141	24	"Way to Go"	Kenneth Fink	Jerry Stahl	May 18, 2006	25.40
The CSIs wait by the bedside of Brass, who is transported to the hospital, and is fighting for his life. Grissom faces a hard choice by having the power of attorney (rather than Brass' daughter Ellie), and decides to proceed with the risky operation to recover the bullet. Ellie would come up from Los Angeles to visit her father, but she would not care if he lives or dies. Meanwhile, the rest of the team investigates the strange ways of life of two victims: a Civil War re-enactor found decapitated by a train, and a 40-year-old man found dead in a hotel with numerous drugs in his system.
