= Catherine Willows =

Fictional character on American television series CSI: Crime Scene Investigation

- CSI: Crime Scene Investigation character
- First appearance: October 6, 2000 (1x01, "Pilot")
- Portrayed by: Marg Helgenberger
- Voiced by: Marg Helgenberger (2003–2004; video games); Edie Mirman (2006–2010; video games)
- City: Las Vegas; Los Angeles

In-universe information
- Occupation: Crime Scene Investigator; FBI Special Agent; Stripper
- Rank: CSI Level III Assistant Supervisor; CSI Level III Supervisor; FBI Special Agent In Charge; Director of the Las Vegas Crime Lab; Blood Spatter Specialist
- Duration: 2000–2012, 2013, 2015, 2022-2024
- Seasons: 1, 2, 3, 4, 5, 6, 7, 8, 9, 10, 11, 12, 14
- Other appearances: Immortality, CSI: Vegas

Catherine Willows is a fictional character, portrayed by Marg Helgenberger, from the CBS crime drama CSI: Crime Scene Investigation and its sequel, CSI: Vegas. Helgenberger made her franchise debut in the first-season episode "Pilot". Helgenberger received several award nominations for her portrayal of Catherine, including two Primetime Emmy Award nominations and two Golden Globe Award nominations.

== Creation and casting ==
On March 16, 2000, Raymond A. Edel from The Record reported that actress Marg Helgenberger had been cast in the pilot episode of CSI: Crime Scene Investigation, a drama that centers on Las Vegas crime scene investigators. Helgenberger's character was billed as "a stripper-turned-investigator who is also a single mom".

The character of Catherine is based on real-life forensics officer Yolanda McClary of the Las Vegas Metropolitan Police. Helgenberger met with McClary and talked about her job in forensics in preparation for the role. The actress stated that McClary helped her understand why she enjoyed working the job. Starting in 2013, McClary appeared prominently on Cold Justice, a reality series devoted to reexamination of unsolved cold case murders usually alongside small-town police who have limited investigative resources.

== Departure ==
Helgenberger announced her departure in 2011, with Catherine making her last appearance in the twelfth season episode "Willows in the Wind", which aired on January 25, 2012. In August 2013, it was announced that Helgenberger would make a guest appearance in the show's 300th episode "Frame by Frame". Catherine appeared in a series of newly recorded flashbacks to a case that occurred in the timeframe of the first season.

== Appearances ==
Series regular

In the first eleven seasons, Helgenberger appeared in all but six episodes: "Random Acts of Violence" in season three, "Hollywood Brass" and "Committed" in season five, and "House of Hoarders," "All That Cremains," and "Unleashed" in season eleven. She also appeared in the first twelve episodes of season twelve before departing the main cast. She is part of the main cast for the second and third seasons of the sequel series, CSI: Vegas.

Guest star

Helgenberger appeared as a guest star in the season fourteen episode "Frame by Frame", before returning for the feature length finale "Immortality".

== Fictional background ==
=== Early life and childhood ===
Catherine Willows was raised by her single mother, Lily Flynn, a cocktail waitress and showgirl. Due to the nature of her mother's jobs, Catherine was constantly moved around the West Coast of America as a child, and because of this, she found it difficult to settle in school. Consequently, she failed to excel to her full potential in school, despite her high intelligence and razor-sharp mind. Catherine left school and began work as an exotic dancer in order to support her boyfriend's music career. She became interested in police work when she befriended a regular at the dance club, Detective Tadero, who also encouraged her to return to school. She attended West Las Vegas University, where she graduated with a degree in Medical Science. Catherine joined the CSI team at LVPD as a lab technician, after which she worked her way up to the role of supervisor under the watchful eye of Gil Grissom.

=== Family and relationships ===
Catherine has one daughter, Lindsey Willows (originally played by Madison McReynolds, then played by Kay Panabaker, and finally played by Katie Stevens in the series finale), who frequently appears in episodes of CSI. Lindsey's father and Catherine's ex-husband, Eddie Willows (Timothy Carhart), also falls into storylines before being murdered. Catherine also discovers that her absent father was, in fact, her old family friend and big casino boss, Sam Braun (Scott Wilson). After coming to terms with the revelation, she lost Braun when he was gunned down.

In Season 10, Catherine began a relationship with LVPD Detective Vartann (Alex Carter). It was revealed in season 11 that Sam Braun had left her a portion of his casino business in his will. She also had a best friend Laura Gabriel (who, in "Willows in the Wind", is revealed to be the person behind all the killings) whom she met up with in the episode "Zippered".

After Catherine's friend is killed (which is revealed to have been staged by Laura and a former FBI agent in "Willows in the Wind") along with four FBI agents, Russell receives an e-mail apparently from her saying that she wants to resign. She is then shot in her home, although she is able to escape with the help of Russell. In the following episode (in which it is revealed the resignation e-mail was fake), she and Russell make it through the firefight, and she is covertly nursed back to health by Doc Robbins with help from others, including the son of Catherine's former boss at the strip club.

=== Character biography ===
The character's original CBS biography (which has since been removed) stated that she was born in Bozeman, Montana on March 26, 1963, and raised by her mother, Lily Flynn (Anita Gillette), a former show girl ("Weeping Willows", "Kiss-Kiss, Bye-Bye"). This biography was later revised. The new version states that the character was born in Las Vegas and raised by her single mother, who worked as a cocktail waitress and showgirl at various jobs along the West Coast.

The seventh-season episode "Living Legend" established that Willows was 16 years old (portrayed by Amy Scott) in 1975, the year the movie Jaws was released, which places her year of birth in either 1958 or 1959. She had occasional contact with her biological father, casino owner Sam Braun, but knew him only as a family friend. Sam Braun nicknamed her "Muggs". She did not learn he had fathered her until she was an adult and compared his DNA sample with her own as part of a murder investigation in the episode "Inside the Box". Willows herself worked for a time as a dancer/stripper and briefly had a cocaine habit, dropping it before pursuing a Bachelor of Science in Medical Technology from UNLV. Like the other characters on CSI, she has a wide knowledge of odd facts that help in their investigations of crime scenes.

Willows has one daughter, Lindsey Willows, and had a stormy relationship with ex-husband Eddie until his murder ("Lady Heather's Box"). Prosecution of Eddie's killer proved impossible due to ambiguous evidence, something she took rather hard.

The show's writers advanced Lindsey's age several years after the death of Eddie, turning the character from preteen to teenager. Willows's relationship with Lindsey soured somewhat after Eddie's murder, and the girl's behavior took a turn for the worse; she would get in fights at school and was once picked up for hitchhiking. Willows took Lindsey to the morgue and showed her the body of a murder victim to impress upon Lindsey the danger of her behavior. Willows later enrolled Lindsey in Butterfield ("4 x 4"), a private school that would keep a tighter rein on her. Lindsay's birthday was mentioned in "Crate 'N' Burial" on October 20, 2000.

Willows's relationship with Sam Braun occasionally created conflicts in cases where he was involved in some way with an ongoing investigation (i.e., "Inside the Box"). Willows however accepted a large monetary gift from Braun, despite some ethical qualms, and became more financially stable. Grissom expressed some misgivings when he learned of this, but no lasting negative repercussions occur.

In episode 702 ("Built to Kill, Part 2"), Sam Braun is shot and dies moments later in Willows's arms. In episode 705 ("Double-Cross"), she lights a candle in a Roman Catholic church in Braun's memory, crosses herself, and whispers, "This one is for you, Sam." It remains to be seen what Willows will inherit from Braun (she was asked about it by fellow investigator Nick Stokes in episode 711 ("Leaving Las Vegas") but beyond describing Braun's large estate as being tied up in land development, she seemed indifferent and not anticipating a large legacy) as he cared very deeply for her, even when she was his legal opponent. At the beginning of episode 1109 ("Wild Life") it is revealed that she owns "a little piece" of the Eclipse Casino, but details are not given.

Willows dates in several episodes. The earliest occurrence was a brief fling with city engineer Paul Newsome (played by Brad Johnson) across three episodes ("$35K O.B.O.", "Justice Is Served" and "Scuba Doobie-Doo"). A later brief flirtation, in the episode "Weeping Willows" (Season 5), ended when the man (Adam Novak, played by Marg Helgenberger's real-life husband, Alan Rosenberg) became overly aggressive.

In Seasons 4 and 5, she dates nightclub owner Chris Bezich (played by Nicholas Lea) whom she meets while investigating a murder that occurred at his night club. Their relationship ends when she discovers him fooling around with one of the club girls. No long-term romantic relationships have otherwise been established, though there was a brief flirtation with fellow CSI Warrick Brown, ending with his marriage, which she described as the end of a "fantasy". She also has flirted with Grissom in a friendly way, he has returned the flirt, especially when he returns from a conference saying he "missed her tush". Willows maintains a close friendship with the other investigators on the night shift, especially Grissom, though she has occasionally criticized him for his lax attitude towards paperwork and office politics. When newcomer Sara Sidle arrived they briefly butted heads, but have become friends since then.

After Greg Sanders is injured in an explosion in the lab in "Play with Fire", Willows visits him in the hospital so that she can tell him personally that she was partially responsible for the accident. Several years later, she also expresses a deal of concern for Sanders when he returns to work not too long after being the victim of a brutal beating in the episode "Fannysmackin'".

After Grissom goes on sabbatical, Willows welcomes his temporary replacement Michael Keppler, accepting Keppler quite quickly into his new role on the team (episode 712, "Sweet Jane"). Despite some misgivings on her part, she is ordered by the Undersheriff McKeen to follow his suggestions in performing an unorthodox investigative style known as "reverse forensics", which, although successful in luring out the suspect, fails to produce charges because of a lack of communication between the undersheriff and the district attorney. It also serves to create a great deal of hard feelings when the other members of her team discover that she and Keppler deceived them and created a false crime scene (episode 713, "Redrum"). After Keppler goes rogue during an investigation, she is the first to express concern to and about him. Unfortunately, she locates him just moments too late, after he takes a fatal bullet meant for a murder witness. When the paramedics declare Keppler to be dead, Willows collapses in tears into (the recently returned) Grissom's arms (episode 715, "Law of Gravity"). Catherine takes Warrick's death in "For Warrick" rather hard, and is possibly the character to show her pain the most, as she breaks down when she sees his body, whereas the others try to keep calm. She told Nick that after Warrick's death she had attended counselling sessions (episode 1101, "Shockwaves"). After Grissom's retirement, Catherine succeeded him as supervisor of the night shift. As Grissom leaves in "One to Go", she is the only one to look up as he leaves; she winks at him as she realizes where he's headed (to Costa Rica to be with Sara), showing the close friendship they share. As supervisor, Catherine oversees a rogue operation that takes Raymond Langston and Nick Stokes to Los Angeles. Ray later murders a suspect, and Catherine is held personally accountable. She is demoted as a result, and spends her final months at CSI working under D.B. Russell.

During a particularly difficult case involving her old school friend, Catherine is offered a job with the FBI. She accepts, and, before leaving Las Vegas, instills some sage advice upon Morgan Brody, paralleling her first conversation with Holly Gribbs in the pilot episode. Catherine returns to CSI in 2015, after three years working at the Los Angeles FBI Field Office. She is given the position of Director of the Las Vegas Crime Lab.

Catherine is mentioned in CSI: Vegas as having taken over one of her dad's casinos as a CEO and that she was in Ireland visiting Lindsay and her grandchild ("Legacy").

Catherine would return to CSI to help out when Grissom and Sara left but also because she had another reason - a friend of hers (Grace) went missing after her shift at the Eclipse. She would reveal to Maxine that the company shut her out and that she suspects they know what happened to Grace.

It would be revealed that Lindsey left CSI since she was doing it to “fulfill her mom’s dream” and that she has a daughter. There would be some tension since Catherine wasn't happy with Lindsey's job (“Koala”).

== Reception ==
For her portrayal of Catherine, Helgenberger received two Golden Globe Award nominations for Best Actress in a Television Series Drama in 2001 and 2002. At the 6th Golden Satellite Awards, Helgenberger was nominated for Best Actress in a Drama Series. She also earned two Primetime Emmy Award nominations for Outstanding Lead Actress in a Drama Series. In 2005, Helgenberger won Favorite Female TV Performer at the 31st People's Choice Awards.

Catherine was listed at number 82 on Bravo's 100 Greatest TV Characters, along with Gil Grissom. She was also included in TV Guide's list of "TV's Sexiest Crime Fighters". A writer for the publication commented "It's not difficult to believe that Catherine Willows was once an exotic dancer at a Vegas strip club. Thankfully, it's because of a regular at that gig that led her to pursuing higher education and eventually snare a CSI job."

While reviewing the pilot episode, Mark A. Perigard from The Boston Herald thought that Catherine was an exception to the show's "revolting characters", calling her "harried but compassionate". Mia Jones from After Ellen praised the character, commenting "CSI's Catherine Willows oozes feminine sex appeal even when she's bogged down with a bullet-proof vest, a gigantic utility belt, baseball cap and aviators. She is the anti-Debra Morgan."

Willows has been included in some of the scholarly publications that examine the show and its effects on society. One paper published in the International Journal of Gender, Science and Technology found that CSI "contributed to the cultural dialogue on women entering STEM fields," saying that Willows specifically is typical of female characters as of 2000: significantly more complex than those in earlier periods but not immune to stereotyping. The paper also notes that when Willows and Sara Sidle are on screen alone together, they rarely talk about men, causing the episode to pass the Bechdel test. It criticizes the show, however, for showing career women like Willows and Sidle as necessarily having terrible social lives, concluding that the script punishes them for choosing STEM careers.

== Succession ==
Catherine has held numerous positions during the series' run, first appearing as a CSI Level III in the series pilot episode. She is replaced in this position by Nick Stokes. She later features in the following roles:

- CSI Level III Assistant Supervisor ("Cool Change" - "Ch-Ch-Changes"), a role she inherited from Grissom. She was succeeded by Sofia Curtis.
- CSI Level III Supervisor ("Mea Culpa" - "Grave Danger (II)"), on the Swing Shift.
- CSI Level III Assistant Supervisor ("Bodies in Motion" - "Leaving Las Vegas"), replacing Sofia Curtis.
- CSI Level III Supervisor ("Sweet Jane" - "Law of Gravity"), an acting position during Grissom's sabbatical.
- CSI Level III Assistant Supervisor ("Monster in the Box - "One to Go"), upon Grissom's return. She is replaced by Nick Stokes.
- CSI Level III Supervisor ("The Grave Shift" - "In a Dark, Dark House"), succeeding Grissom. She is later replaced by D.B. Russell.
- CSI Level III Assistant Supervisor ("73 Seconds" - "Willows in the Wind"), following her demotion. She succeeds Stokes, and is replaced by Julie Finlay.
- FBI Special Agent in Charge ("Willows in the Wind" - "Immortality"), based out of the Los Angeles field office.
- Director of the Las Vegas Crime Lab ("Immortality"), a role she acquires when Sara departs the Crime Lab. She replaces D.B. Russell.
