= Nick Stokes =

Fictional character

- CSI: Crime Scene Investigation character
- First appearance: October 6, 2000 (1x01, "Pilot")
- Last appearance: February 15, 2015 (15x18, "The End Game")
- Portrayed by: George Eads
- City: Las Vegas; San Diego

In-universe information
- Occupation: Crime Scene Investigator
- Rank: CSI Level II; CSI Level III; CSI Level III Assistant Supervisor; Director of the San Diego Crime Lab; Hair and Fiber Specialist
- Duration: 2000–2015
- Seasons: 1, 2, 3, 4, 5, 6, 7, 8, 9, 10, 11, 12, 13, 14, 15
- Born: August 18, 1971 (age 54)

Nicholas Stokes is a fictional character from the CBS crime drama CSI: Crime Scene Investigation, portrayed by George Eads. He made his first screen appearance in the show's pilot, broadcast on October 6, 2000, and departed the series on February 15, 2015, in "The End Game." Eads is credited in 335 episodes of the series.

== Character background ==
Nicholas Stokes was born in Austin, Texas, to Judge Bill Stokes and lawyer Jillian Stokes as the youngest of seven children, with at least one brother. As a child, he showed athletic and academic potential and played football. Overall, he had a happy childhood and a close relationship with his parents. Nick's father calls him "Pancho" and Nick, in turn, calls his father "Cisco", both characters from the television show, The Cisco Kid. During the conclusion of one episode, Gil Grissom uses the name to calm Nick while rescuing him from a coffin that was rigged with explosives.

Nick's early life was not without pain, however; he was molested at age nine by a female babysitter. As a result, he often has difficulty investigating crimes committed against children.

Nick attended Texas A&M University, where he pledged at a fraternity. After leaving college, he joined the Dallas Police Department and took a job with the crime lab, where he specialized in hair and fiber analysis. Because of a feeling that he would not be able to match his parents' considerable achievements, Nick decided to leave Texas for Las Vegas. There, he found he could "be his own man", and joined its successful CSI team under the leadership of Grissom in 1997.

== Career ==
Nick has a natural empathy with the people affected by the crimes he investigates, in contrast with many of his colleagues, who prefer to keep an emotional distance. On occasion, Nick's empathy causes friction with his colleague Warrick Brown and with his supervisor, Grissom, but Nick defends his approach and it often proves beneficial to the case. Nick has a good command of Spanish; he frequently deals with cases involving Hispanics and the Latino community. Nick is one of the CSI team that carries and uses a gun most often. He carried a few different guns including a stainless Smith & Wesson SW99, Smith & Wesson Model 5906 and a two-tone H&K USP during his time on the show and also kept a Glock Model 19 as an off duty/undercover piece. Nick is a fairly good shot and of the CSI team was one of the most willing to engage in a gun battle but he almost always tried to use other methods first.

In season six, Nick grows a moustache then shaves it off. He has had a variety of hair cuts, such as a mop-top and a shaved head.

In the season-five episode "Grave Danger," Nick is kidnapped and buried alive in a glass coffin rigged with explosives. He was previously stalked by Nigel Crane, a cable technician, who threw him from a second-story window.

Nick is characterized as something of a ladies' man, but the only onscreen romance over the course of the series is a brief affair with a prostitute named Kristi Hopkins and a date with Dr. Robbins's niece. His bad luck in relationships might be explained by a running gag that whenever Nick is with a woman, misfortune befalls someone else. For example, he has a one-night stand with Kristi, and she is murdered later that night, resulting in him being a suspect. Also, Nick and Catherine go to a club together, then shortly after Nick meets a woman at the club, Catherine is drugged and abducted. Again, during breakfast with the team at a diner, Nick eyes a pretty waitress and stays behind to get her number, while Warrick leaves. Shortly afterward, Warrick is murdered. In the season 13 episode "Play Dead", Nick refers to a girlfriend in passing when talking to his dog, Sam.

Catherine turns down an offer to move into Grissom's office and offers it to Nick. He accepts it after some thought, then, in turn, decides to share the office space with Greg Sanders and Riley Adams. Grissom's infamous "fetal pig in a jar" is placed in the room by Hodges, who says, "it is where it belongs".

Nick is promoted to assistant supervisor after Sara Sidle advises Catherine that she needs a "number two". Nick handles tarantulas and takes Grissom's old tarantula under his care. However, Nick's promotion is compromised after the squad tries to apprehend serial killer Nate Haskell in Los Angeles. Nick and Dr. Raymond "Ray" Langston are apprehended by the LAPD for going beyond their jurisdiction, when Nick used his gun in attempt to apprehend Haskell. Haskell kills Tina, but Ray is implicated in her death. Nick returns from a work-related trip to find that he has lost his office to new CSI supervisor D.B. Russell (season 12 premiere).

In the season-12 finale, "Homecoming", Nick announces to his colleagues that he is quitting his job at CSI, as he is no longer able to stand the widespread corruption in the department. He then walks out of the room and appears to be heading out of the building. In the season 13 premiere, "Karma to Burn", following a drunken confrontation with police, he is convinced by Sara Sidle to return to the team.

In "The End Game", Nick leaves Las Vegas when he is named the director of the San Diego PD crime lab. Nick reveals to Sara that he has gotten an offer that is too good to refuse, but it will mean walking away from the friendships he has cultivated in Las Vegas. Sara says that she will only be a car ride away and reminds him what Grissom would say to him: "You gotta go where you can do the most good."

=== Relationship with colleagues ===
Nick is an affable man, friendly even to David Hodges. Prior to Warrick's death, the duo are good friends and Nick sets up a college fund for Warrick's son. Nick colludes with Greg and Hodges to kidnap Henry for his birthday celebrations. He shares a good-natured relationship with Gil Grissom. When a new investigator, Ray Langston, takes his first case, Nick acts as his mentor, giving him tips and helping with the investigation. Nick flirts a little with Catherine Willows, his good friend and coworker, who becomes something of an "older sister" figure to him. When Nick learns of Willows' resignation, and she says goodbye, Nick cries and tells Willows that she will always be with them at CSI.

== Departure ==
Eads' departure from CSI: Crime Scene Investigation was announced in November 2014, and Nick made his exit at the end of the 15th and final season.

== External sources ==
- Nick Stokes Biography.
