= Don McGill =

American television producer and writer

- Born: April 18, 1963 (age 63); New York City, U.S.
- Occupations: Writer and Producer
- Employer: CBS TV Studios
- Known for: CSI, JAG, NUMB3RS, NCIS

Don McGill (born April 18, 1963) is an American television producer and writer who assisted with producing and even starred in some episodes of JAG; he also aided in the production and/or writing of such TV series as CSI, NUMB3RS, and NCIS.

== Television career ==
McGill wrote for the TV show NUMB3RS for which he acted as executive producer. He was a producer alongside Donald P. Bellisario on JAG and helped him create NCIS, which McGill also wrote for.

He became the sole executive producer of CSI for the show's fifteenth season after long-time show producer Carol Mendelsohn departed from the series, and remained with the series until its cancellation.

== Filmography ==
=== Television ===
The numbers in writing credits refer to the number of episodes.

Title	Year	Credited as			Network	Notes
Title	Year	Creator	Writer	Executive producer	Network	Notes
JAG	2001–05	No	Yes (16)	No	NBC; USA Network; CBS	story editor (2002–03: 29 episodes), producer (2003: 5 episodes), supervising producer (2004–5: 31 episodes), co-executive producer (2005: 3 episodes)
NCIS	2003–present	Yes	Yes (4)	No	CBS	supervising producer (2003: 9 episodes)
Numbers	2005–09	No	Yes (13)	Yes	CBS	co-executive producer (2005–07: 48 episodes), executive producer (2007–10: 57 episodes)
CSI: Crime Scene Investigation	2010–15	No	Yes (9)	Yes	CBS	
Bull	2016–17	No	No	No	CBS	consulting producer (9 episodes)
