= Marc Vann =

American actor

- Born: August 23, 1954 (age 70); Norfolk, Virginia, U.S.
- Occupation: Actor
- Years active: 1992–2016
- Spouse: Mary Easterling (m. 1985; div. 1988)

Marc Vann (born August 23, 1954) is an American actor. He is known for his role as Conrad Ecklie in the CBS television series CSI: Crime Scene Investigation. He also had notable roles in Angel and Early Edition.

Vann was born in Norfolk, Virginia. He initially had little interest in acting or theater, but he was introduced to the craft through a mime workshop while studying for his MBA. He subsequently got involved in theater before moving to L.A. to start a career as a television actor. Vann was active in local and regional theater in the Chicago area most memorably in his early career at Wisdom Bridge Theatre and Center Theatre. He added immeasurably to the success of the Wisdom Bridge Theatre production of The Great Gatsby that also starred the actor Harry Lennix, who was race/color blind cast as Gatsby.

On February 28, 2008, Vann pulled off a special feat, guest starring back to back in new episodes of two different series, both on ABC. First, he played a ship's doctor on the cult phenomenon Lost, and then played an automotive worker who was bribed into moving to Hawaii and not testifying in a trial in Eli Stone. He was recently in a "Skittles" commercial as the doctor. In 2011 he appeared in two episodes of Torchwood: Miracle Day as camp manager Colin Maloney.

== Filmography ==
Year	Title	Role	Notes
1992	Meet the Parents	Second Customer	
1996	Early Edition	Phil Pritchard	3 episodes
1997	Hoodlum	Dutch's Liquor Henchman	
1998	U.S. Marshals	Deputy Jackson	
1998	Since You've Been Gone	Robert Smith	TV movie
1998	Cupid	Dr. Ian Frechette	Episode: First Loves
1999	Payback	Gray	
1999	Seven Days	Sgt. David Korshak	Episode: For the Children
2000	Malcolm in the Middle	Mr. Pinter	Episode: Lois vs. Evil
2000	Judging Amy	Officer Wilbourne	Episode: Blast from the Past
2000, 2004	NYPD Blue	Harry Forsic/Paul Grady	2 episodes: "Roll Out the Barrel" and "Old Yeller"
2000–2015	CSI: Crime Scene Investigation	Conrad Ecklie	37 episodes
2001	Stranger Inside	Nelson	TV movie
2001	Kate Brasher	Dan Vickers	Episode: Kate
2001	When Billie Beat Bobby	Young Buck	TV movie
2001	The Forsaken	Decker	
2001	Ghost World	Jerome, the Angry Guy – Record Collector	
2001	Just Ask My Children	Detective Felton	
2002	JAG	Police Detective	Episode: Hero Worship
2002	The Guardian	Nursing Home Director	Episode: The Chinese Wall
2002	Flying	Roger	
2002	Frasier	Paul	Episode: Proxy Prexy
2003	The Shield	Bob	Episode: Partners
2003	L.A. Dragnet	Fergus Cook	Episode: Slice of Life
2003	Karen Sisco	Phillip Garnier	Episode: Nobody's Perfect
2003–2004	Angel	Doctor Sparrow	3 episodes
2003, 2009	Monk	Hal Duncan/Curator Miles Franklin	2 episodes
2004	The Practice	Terry Glazer	2 episodes
2004	Crossing Jordan	Harold Goddard	Episode: Second Chances
2005	In Memory of My Father	Marc	
2005	A Thousand Beautiful Things	Tom	
2005–2006	Boston Legal	D.A. Scott Berger	2 episodes
2006	Damages	Damages	TV movie
2006	The Drop	Mr. One	
2006	Art School Confidential	Kevin	
2006	The O.C.	Detective Warner	Episode: The Road Warrior
2006	Standoff	Roger Lestak	Episode: Borderline
2007	Dirt	Dr. Kozar	Episode: What to Expect When You're Expecting
2007	NCIS: Naval Criminal Investigative Service	Mark Sadowski	Episode: Dead Man Walking
2007	Spider-Man 3	Play Producer	
2007	Grey's Anatomy	Hematologist	Episode: Time After Time
2007	Without a Trace	Pete Weber	Episode: Two of Us
2007	I Now Pronounce You Chuck & Larry	Protestor	
2007	Women's Murder Club	David	Episode: Welcome to the Club
2007-2015	Criminal Minds	Adam Fuchs	Episodes: "Penelope", "Rock Creek Park"
2008	Eli Stone	Stanley Lyme	Episode: One More Try
2008	Man Maid	Govna	
2008	Lost	Doctor Ray	4 episodes
2009	Captain Cook's Extraordinary Atlas	Mr. Boots	TV movie
2009	Lie to Me	Jim Gunderson	Episode: The Best Policy
2010	Scoundrels	Lawrence Greenwood	Episode: Mary, Mary, Quite Contrary
2011	Torchwood: Miracle Day	Colin Maloney	(2 episodes) The Categories of Life - The Middle Men
2012	Modern Family	Stan	Episode: "Virgin Territory"

== Theatre ==
=== Goodman Theatre ===
- All The Rage

=== Victory Gardens Theatre ===
- Flyovers

=== Steppenwolf Theatre Company ===
- Hysteria .... Salvador Dalí
