= Jon Wellner =

American actor

- Born: July 11, 1975 (age 51); Evanston, Illinois, U.S.
- Occupation: Actor
- Years active: 1997–present

Jon Wellner (born July 11, 1975) is an American actor, best known for his role as toxicologist Henry Andrews on CSI: Crime Scene Investigation. He has portrayed Andrews from 2004 through to the 2015 season, his 11th with the show.

He began his affiliation with the show in season 4 as a researcher, verifying that the information on the show was accurate. He had a role as a zookeeper in season 5, then took on the role of Andrews. He continues to serve as a researcher for the show. In 2009 he and fellow cast member/researcher David Berman formed a company that does research for several other television forensics shows including Bones, CSI: Miami, and Drop Dead Diva.

== Filmography ==
| Show | Character | Year | Notes |
|---|---|---|---|
| Becker | Graduate #2 | 2001 | 2 episodes |
| Gilmore Girls | Mikey | 2001 | |
| Brown Eyed Girl | Baxter | 2001 | Video Short |
| The King Of Queens | Keith | 2001 | Uncredited |
| Surviving Gilligan's Island | Bob Denver | 2001 | TV movie |
| Providence | Van Buyer | 2002 | |
| The Court | Hoots | 2002 | |
| Walkin' Free | Johnny No Bones | 2002 | Video Short |
| The 24 Year-Old Virgin | Dale | 2003 | Video Short |
| Yes, Dear | Man | 2003 | |
| CSI: Crime Scene Investigation | Sam Tracy | 2004 | 1 Episode - Unbearable |
| CSI: Crime Scene Investigation | Henry Andrews | 2004–2015 | (114 episodes) |
| Judging Amy | Alan Schein | 2005 | |
| NCIS | Simon Frankel | 2005 | 1 episode - Red Cell |
| Life on a Stick | Kenny | 2005 | |
| That's So Raven | Brad | 2005 | 1 Episode - Food for Thought |
| Twenty Questions | Pierce Lowell | 2006 | |
| Courting Alex | Reporter | 2006 | |
| Grad Night | Brett Johnson | 2006 | |
| Vanished | Agent | 2006 | |
| What News? | Tom Thompson | 2007 | |
| Evan Almighty | Staffer | 2007 | |
| Ocean's Thirteen | Bellman | 2007 | |
| Thieves | Harvey Reese | 2007 | |
| Bones | Mike Campbell | 2008 | 1 Episode - The Con Man in the Meth Lab |
| Dude, Where's My Bar? | Monty the Mole | 2009 | Video Short |
| Drop Dead Diva | Calvin | 2011 | 1 Episode - Mother's Day |
| Major Crimes | Attorney | 2012 | 1 Episode - The Shame Game |
| Shameless | Charles | 2021 | 1 Episode - Survivors |
