= Eric Szmanda =

American actor (born 1975)

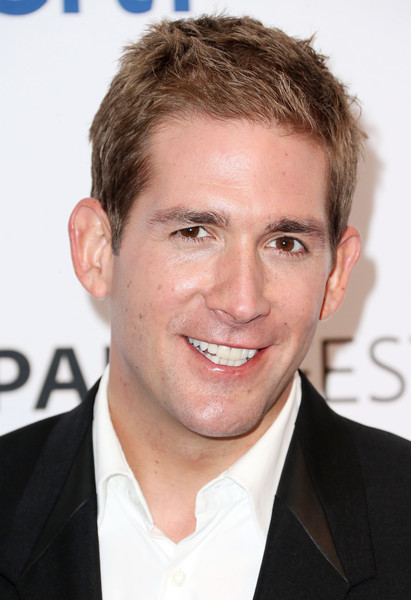
- Szmanda in 2015
- Born: Eric Kyle Szmanda; July 24, 1975 (age 51); Milwaukee, Wisconsin, U.S.
- Education: American Academy of Dramatic Arts; Carroll College
- Occupation: Actor
- Years active: 1998–present
- Known for: Greg Sanders on CSI: Crime Scene Investigation

Eric Kyle Szmanda (/səˈmændə/; born July 24, 1975) is an American actor. He is best known for having played Greg Sanders in the CBS police drama CSI: Crime Scene Investigation, a role he held from the show's beginning in 2000 until it ended in 2015.

== Early life and education ==
Szmanda was born in Milwaukee, Wisconsin, to Elaine (née Enders) and Donald Szmanda, and has two brothers, Brett and Robert. His great-uncle Ray Szmanda was the "Menards Guy," a local celebrity in the Midwest famous for his enthusiastic ads for Menards, a chain of hardware stores.

When Eric was very young, the family moved to Mukwonago, Wisconsin. He attended Mukwonago High School and subsequently Carroll College in Waukesha, Wisconsin. While he was in school, he began marketing internships with music conglomerate BMG and moved to Chicago, Illinois, to take a full-time job in the music business.

Szmanda attended classes for four years at the American Academy of Dramatic Arts in Pasadena, California, and graduated.

== Career ==
In his first role on television, Szmanda starred in The Net, a series based on the 1995 film of the same name.

In 2000, Szmanda began a recurring role in the CBS police drama CSI: Crime Scene Investigation in the first two seasons as Greg Sanders, a DNA technician and investigator. He was subsequently added to the main cast in the third season. He remained on the show until it ended after the fifteenth season in September 2015.

== Activism ==
Szmanda supports the U.S. Campaign for Burma and traveled to Thailand to see the conditions of Burmese refugees who have fled their native country.

Szmanda showed his support for Animal Defenders International (ADI) in March 2017 along with former CSI co-star Jorja Fox. The two helped to host a benefit to raise money for the charity that aims to help and save animals all over the world from circuses and from other forms of animal cruelty. He and Fox attended the White House to help put forward a bill to stop circuses from using animals and protect them.

== Filmography ==
=== Film and television credits ===
Year	Title	Role	Notes
1998–1999	The Net	Jacob Resh/Sorcerer	Television debut Series regular; 13 episodes
1999	Dodge's City	Johnny Dodge	Television movie
2000	Oh Baby	Brent	Two episodes
2000	Zoe, Duncan, Jack & Jane	Max	Episode: "A Midsummer Night's Nightmare"
2000	100 Girls	Sam/Computer Nerd	Film debut
2000	FreakyLinks	Eli	Episode: "Subject: Edith Keeler Must Die"
2000	Big Time	Avery	Short film
2000–2015	CSI: Crime Scene Investigation	Greg Sanders	46 episodes; recurring role 287 episodes; series regular Screen Actors Guild Award for Outstanding Performance by an Ensemble in a Drama Series (2005); Nominated—Screen Actors Guild Award for Outstanding Performance by an Ensemble in a Drama Series (2002–2004)
2001	Three Sisters	Dave	Episode: "The Faculty Party"
2001	The Division	Mark	Episode: "The Parent Trap"
2002	The Rules of Attraction	NYU Film Student	
2004	Marilyn Manson: Saint	Himself	Video short/music video
2004	True Vinyl	Billy Thompson	
2005	Little Athens	Derek	
2005	Snow Wonder	Luke	Television movie
2012	Shadow of Fear	Detective Dominic Leary	Television movie
2015	CSI: Immortality	Greg Sanders	Television movie
2018	Near Extinction: Shangri-La	Vargas	Television movie
2023	CSI: Vegas	Greg Sanders	

=== Video games ===
Year	Title	Role	Notes
2003	CSI: Crime Scene Investigation	Greg Sanders (voice role)	
2004	CSI: Crime Scene Investigation - Dark Motives	Lab Technician Greg Sanders (voice role)	
2006	CSI: 3 Dimensions of Murder	Greg Sanders (voice role)	
2007	CSI: Crime Scene Investigation - Hard Evidence	Greg Sanders (voice role)	
2009	CSI: Crime Scene Investigation - Deadly Intent	Greg Sanders (voice role)	
2010	CSI: Fatal Conspiracy	Greg Sanders (voice role)	

=== Stage ===
Year	Title	Role	Notes
2015	The Nerd	Willum Cubbert	Totem Pole Playhouse
