= David Berman (actor) =

American actor

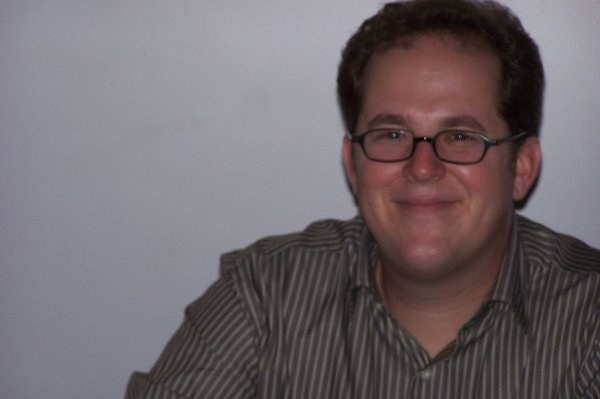
- Born: November 1, 1973 (age 52); United States
- Occupations: Television actor, researcher

David Berman is an American actor and researcher mostly known for his work on CSI: Crime Scene Investigation where he played Assistant Medical Examiner David "Super Dave" Phillips.

Behind the scenes, Berman co-founded Entertainment Research Consultants (ERC) with former CSI alum, Jon Wellner. ERC has worked on dozens of productions including CSI, CSI: Miami, Bones, The Blackist, Zoo, Dopesick, and Rizzoli & Isles.

As an actor, Berman has a recurring role as Dr. Ogden Maguire on the NBC drama, The Blacklist. Other acting credits include Desperate Housewives, Vanished, Daybreak, Bones and recurring roles on Drop Dead Diva and Heroes. Berman also appeared in the JD Salinger bio-pic, Rebel in the Rye with Nicholas Hoult.

Berman also hosted the National Geographic mini-series, Lost Faces of the Bible.

== Filmography ==
Film
Year	Title	Role	Notes
2000	Profiler	Computer Tech	episode: Besieged
2000-2015	CSI: Crime Scene Investigation	David Phillips	287 Episodes, Recurring (seasons 1-9) Main role (seasons 10-15)
2006	Heroes	Brian Davis	episode: Chapter Ten 'Six Months Ago'
2006	Outside Sales	Herb Mulligan	
2008	Gemini Division	Lead Scientist	
2008	Vanished	Agent Edward Dockery	7 episodes
2009-2014	Drop Dead Diva	Hank Spencer	5 episodes
2010	Desperate Housewives	Larry	episode: A Little Night Music (Season 6 Episode 21)
2014	Midnight Sex Run	Roland	
2015	Bones	Tim Diffley	
2019-2020	The Blacklist	Dr. Ogden Maguire	5 episodes
