= Carol Mendelsohn =

American screenwriter (born 1951)

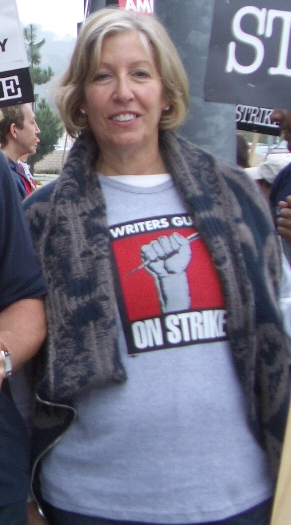
- Carol Mendelsohn, November 2007
- Born: 1951 (age 74–75); Chicago, Illinois
- Education: Cornell University (B.A.); George Washington University Law School (J.D.)
- Occupation: Television writer

Carol Mendelsohn (born 1951) is an American television producer, showrunner, and screenwriter, known for her work on the crime drama CSI: Crime Scene Investigation.

== Education ==
Mendelsohn grew up in Chicago, where her father was an attorney. She attended the Latin School of Chicago. Also she went to Smith College, but later transferred and in 1973 graduated from Cornell University. She then went to the George Washington University Law School and practiced at the Washington, D.C., office of the prominent Los Angeles–based firm Wyman, Bautzer, Rothman, & Kuchel. She also worked for the U.S. Securities and Exchange Commission.

== Film and television career ==
Realizing that she did not want to be a lawyer, she enrolled in an American Film Institute class. She moved to Los Angeles and started writing for the movie industry. Her early work included contributions to Hardcastle and McCormick, Stingray and Wiseguy. As producer for Cannell Studios, she worked on The Trials of Rosie O'Neill and Melrose Place.

In 2000, Mendelsohn joined the production of CSI: Crime Scene Investigation and became its show runner and executive producer. In the fall of 2003, new long-term contracts made Mendelsohn and Ann Donahue "the two highest-paid female writers in television drama."

In June 2014, it was announced that after 14 years Mendelsohn would leave CSI.

She was also co-creator and executive producer of CSI: Miami, CSI: NY and CSI: Cyber. In 2008, she wrote the episode "Fish in a Drawer" for Two and a Half Men. It is reported that she signed a deal with Universal in 2018.

In 2022, she signed a first-look deal with Fox Entertainment.

== Awards and nominations ==
As part of the CSI team, she was nominated for the Writers Guild of America Award, the Producers Guild of America Award (twice), the Emmy Award (three times) and the Edgar Award.
