= List of people with hepatitis C =

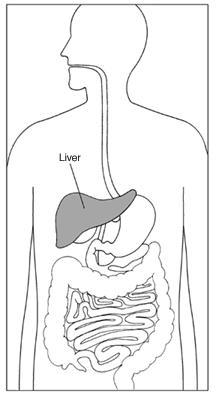
The human liver, the site of hepatitis C infection

The infectious disease hepatitis C is caused by the hepatitis C virus (HCV), which affects the liver. During the initial infection, people often have mild or no symptoms, and there is typically no symptoms early during chronic infection. This condition can progress to scarring of the liver (fibrosis), and advanced scarring (cirrhosis). Over many years however, it often leads to liver disease and occasionally cirrhosis. In some cases, those with cirrhosis will develop complications such as liver failure, liver cancer, or dilated blood vessels in the esophagus and stomach.

Although HCV was not discovered until April 1989, an estimated 170 million people worldwide are infected by hepatitis C. As of April 2014, 130—150 million globally suffer from chronic hepatitis C infection; a significant number develop cirrhosis of the liver or liver cancer. Each year, 350,000 to 500,000 people die from hepatitis C-related liver diseases. No vaccine is available at this time. The symptoms of infection can be medically managed when the disease is diagnosed early, and a proportion of patients can be cleared of the virus by a course of anti-viral medicines. Globally, an estimated 50–95% of people treated are cured. With more recently developed medications, cure rates are around 80 to 95%. The symptoms of HCV infection, especially in its early stages, can be mild enough to conceal the fact of the disease; thus, some people do not seek treatment. As Live Aid founder Bob Geldof states, "Stigma, shame and fear can suffocate awareness. These barriers prevent people from getting tested, receiving treatment, and clearing themselves of this disease". A number of celebrities diagnosed with the disease have decided to go public to raise awareness about hepatitis C and to encourage more people to get tested for the disease.

== Acting ==
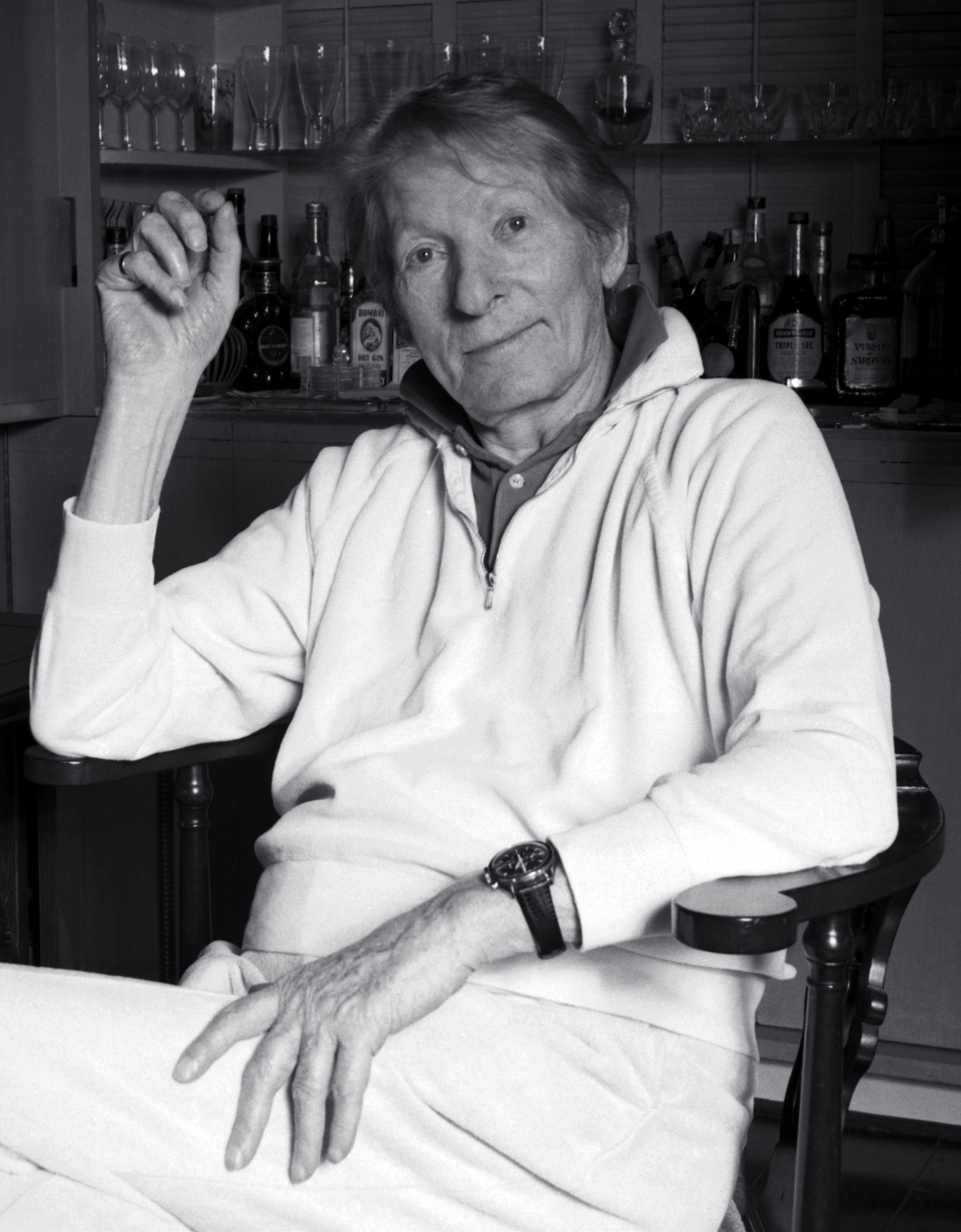
Danny Kaye, in 1987

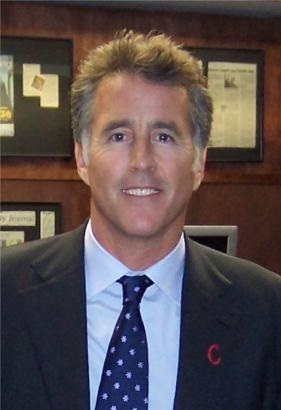
Actor Christopher Lawford

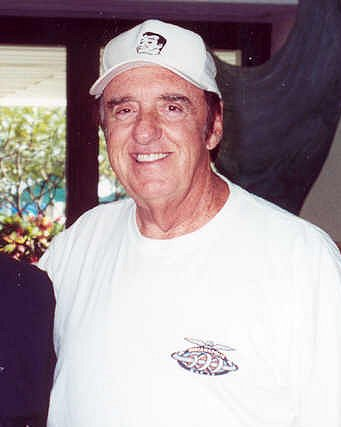
Actor Jim Nabors

Name	Lifetime	Comments
Pamela Anderson	1967–	Famous for her role as C.J. Parker on the television series Baywatch. She has, since late 2015 had a successful treatment of hepatitis C, and has been cured of the disease.
Stanley Fafara	1943–2003	Child actor who played "Whitey" on Leave it to Beaver. He was a recovering heroin addict who died after complications from surgery.
Christiane F.	1962–	German woman portrayed in the book Zoo Station: The Story of Christiane F. and its film adaptation Christiane F. She contracted hepatitis C from an infected needle in the late 1980s while injecting heroin.
Danny Kaye	1911–1987	American actor, singer, dancer, comedian, and musician. His performances featured physical comedy, idiosyncratic pantomimes, and rapid-fire novelty songs. He contacted hepatitis C four years before his death from a transfusion during surgery.
Christopher Lawford	1955–2018	Son of Peter Lawford and nephew of John F. Kennedy, best known for his role as Charlie Brent on the soap opera All My Children in the early 1990s. He was diagnosed with hepatitis C in 2000.
Linda Lovelace	1949–2002	The star of the 1972 pornographic film Deep Throat. She contracted hepatitis C from a blood transfusion after a car accident in 1969 and had a liver transplant in 1987.
Natasha Lyonne	1979–	American actress best known for her roles in Orange Is the New Black and Russian Doll.
Jim Nabors	1930–2017	Best known for his role in Gomer Pyle, U.S.M.C.. His immune system was compromised since receiving a liver transplant in 1994.
Anita Pallenberg	1944–2017	Italian-born model, actress and fashion designer. According to Marianne Faithfull, "she almost single-handedly engineered a cultural revolution in London by bringing together the Stones and ... transformed the [Rolling] Stones from pop stars into cultural icons."
Rockets Redglare	1949–2001	Actor and comic. Died from combination of kidney failure, liver failure, cirrhosis and hepatitis C.
Lucy Saroyan	1946–2003	Actress and daughter of William Saroyan who had minor roles in over 20 movies. She died from cirrhosis of the liver complicated by hepatitis C.
Ken Watanabe	1959–	Japanese actor best known for his role in The Last Samurai, he disclosed in his autobiography that he had contracted hepatitis C, and in 2006, told reporters that he was being successfully treated.

== Business ==
Name	Lifetime	Comments
Rocky Aoki	1938–2008	Japanese businessman and founder of Benihana.
Anita Roddick	1942–2007	Founder of The Body Shop chain of cosmetics stores. She contracted hepatitis C from a blood transfusion in 1971, and was diagnosed in February 2007. She campaigned to make hepatitis C more of serious health concern and died of a brain hemorrhage in September 2007.

== Music ==
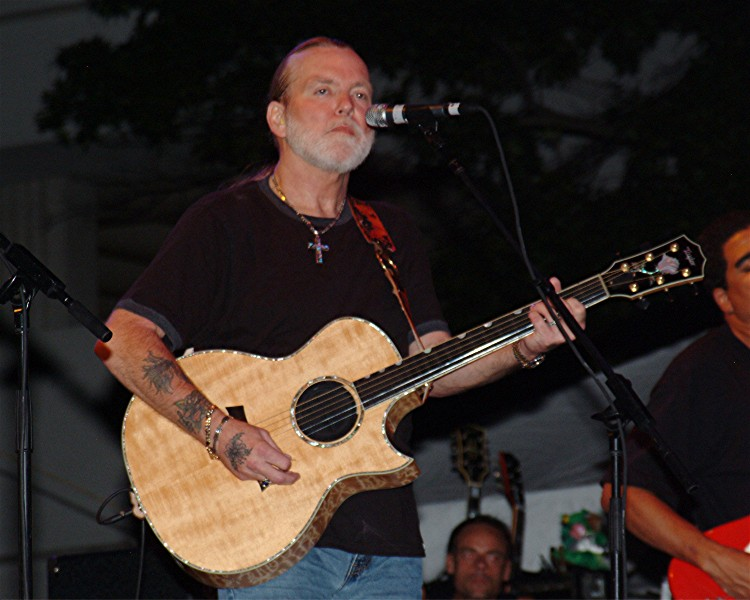
Musician Gregg Allman in concert, 2006

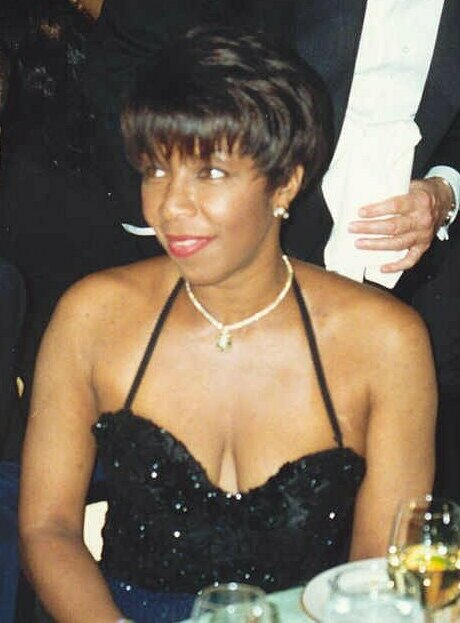
Singer Natalie Cole at the Emmy Awards, 2004

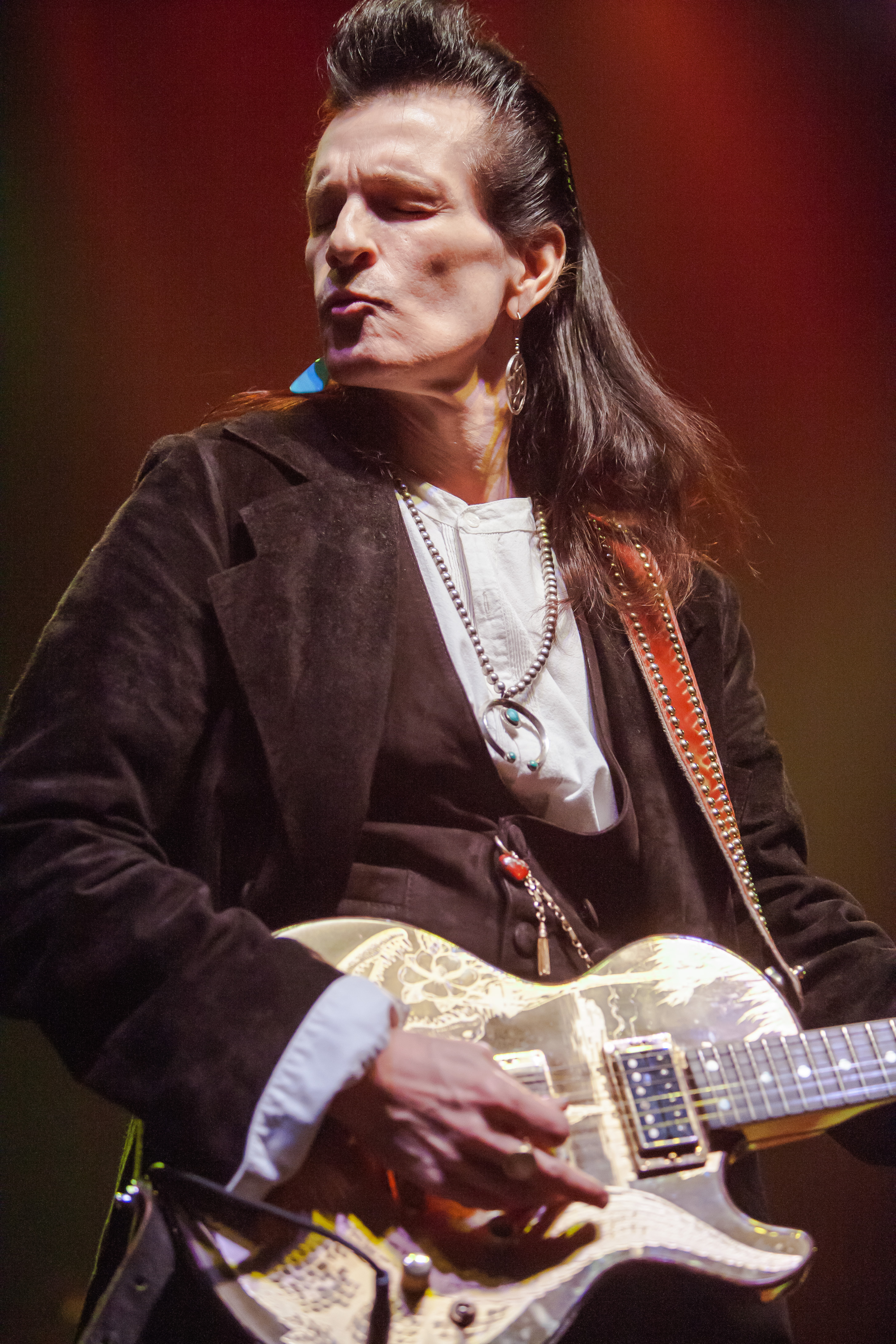
Punk rock pioneer Willy DeVille, 2008

Gospel music artist Gary S. Paxton, backstage at the Country Gospel Music Awards, 2007

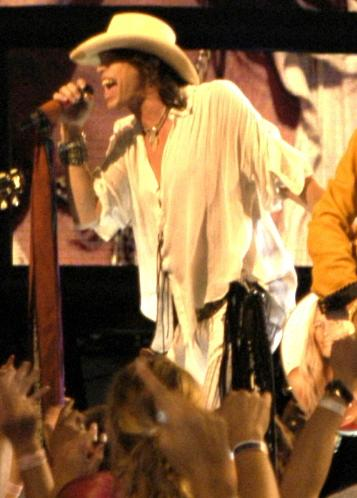
Musician Steven Tyler

Name	Lifetime	Comments
Gregg Allman	1947–2017	Rock musician and founding member of The Allman Brothers Band.
Mark Arm	1962–	Grunge singer/guitarist, and co-founding member of both Green River and Mudhoney.
Ray Benson	1941–	Front man of the band Asleep at the Wheel, he believed that he got hepatitis C from a tattoo needle. He later become a vocal spokesperson for the disease.
Natalie Cole	1950–2015	Singer and daughter of Nat King Cole. She was diagnosed in 2008 during a routine examination, when she found that the disease had been in her body for 20 years without her knowing it.
David Crosby	1941–2023	Guitarist, singer, and songwriter, best known for being a founding member of The Byrds and Crosby, Stills, Nash & Young. He was diagnosed after collapsing onstage in the summer of 1994 and received a life-saving liver transplant later that year.
Willy DeVille	1950–2009	One of the founders of the band Mink DeVille and a pioneer in punk rock. He was diagnosed with hepatitis C in February 2009 and was found to have pancreatic cancer during the course of his treatment.
Alejandro Escovedo	1951–	Songwriter, member of the San Francisco punk scene. By 2014, he had recovered from his illness, which was treated with holistic medicine.
Marianne Faithfull	1946–2025	Singer and actress who dated Mick Jagger in the 60s. She was diagnosed with the virus in the 1990s, after a long period of drug abuse and clinical depression.
Freddy Fender	1937–2006	Musician who introduced Tex-Mex music to a wider audience. Struggled with alcoholism, drug abuse, and diabetes. He had a kidney transplant (the kidney was donated by his 21-year-old daughter) in 2002 and had a liver transplant two years later.
Diamanda Galás	1955–	Avant-garde vocalist who got hepatitis C from drug use, by 2005, she was in remission.
Grant Hart	1961–2017	Guitarist and co-lead vocalist of Hüsker Dü.
Chet Helms	1942–2005	Music producer who helped create the vibrant San Francisco rock music scene in the 1960s. He was undergoing treatment for hepatitis C when he suffered a stroke.
Dusty Hill	1949–2021	Bassist and vocalist with rock group ZZ Top. Their tour was cancelled when he was diagnosed in 2000. After he received treatment and went into remission, the band resumed touring in 2002.
Rowland S. Howard	1959–2009	Guitarist of The Birthday Party and Crime & the City Solution, frontman of These Immortal Souls.
Etta James	1938–2012	Singer, called "Little Peaches", who was best known for her song "At Last".
Naomi Judd	1946–2022	Member of the mother-daughter duo The Judds; she retired in 1991 after being diagnosed with hepatitis C, but returned to touring with her daughter Wynonna by 2011.
Anthony Kiedis	1962–	American vocalist/lyricist of the rock band Red Hot Chili Peppers. He contracted hepatitis C from drug use.
Phil Lesh	1940–2024	Founding member and bass guitarist of the rock band Grateful Dead. He received a life-saving liver transplant in 1998.
David Marks	1948–	Founding member of The Beach Boys, was diagnosed in 1999. After undergoing treatment, Marks has been virus free since 2004. His diagnosis inspired him to stop drinking and smoking, and lead a healthier lifestyle.
Tawn Mastrey	1957–2007	Disc jockey who was the voice of 1980s heavy-metal scene in Los Angeles. She contracted hepatitis C when she was a child.
Kenny Neal	1957–	New Orleans blues guitarist. Diagnosed in 2005, less than one year after his brother, musician Ronnie Neal, died of hepatitis C. He was successfully treated and went into remission.
Chuck Negron	1942–	Vocalist and founding member of Three Dog Night. He contracted hepatitis C due to "the long-lasting effects of drug use and alcoholism".
Gary S. Paxton	1938–2016	Bakersfield country and gospel music artist. He contracted hepatitis C through several blood transfusions and almost died from the disease in 1990.
Martin Phillipps		Co-founder and front runner of the New Zealand-based, Dunedin sound rock band The Chills. Phillipps contracted hep C from alcohol and drug abuse in the 1990s, but received a "miracle reprieve" when the drug Harvoni was used to treat it in 2016.
Lou Reed	1942–2013	Singer, guitarist, and songwriter whose work with the Velvet Underground influenced generations of rock musicians. He struggled with hepatitis C for many years before receiving a liver transplant in 2013, but died later that year.
Keith Richards	1943–	Founding member of The Rolling Stones. He credited his "incredible immune system" with curing his hepatitis C, "without even bothering to do anything about it".
Curtis Salgado	1954–	Blues musician who was diagnosed with hepatitis C in 1988 and had a successful liver transplant in 2006.
Tony Scalzo	1964–	Rock musician and songwriter, best known as a founding member of the band Fastball.
Randy Turner	1949–2005	Lead singer for the seminal hardcore punk band Big Boys.
Steven Tyler	1948–	Musician, songwriter, and member of the rock band Aerosmith. In September 2006, he announced that he had been diagnosed three years prior and had just completed eleven months of treatment.
Scott Weiland	1967–2015	Singer, songwriter, and member of the rock bands Stone Temple Pilots and Velvet Revolver.

== Politics ==
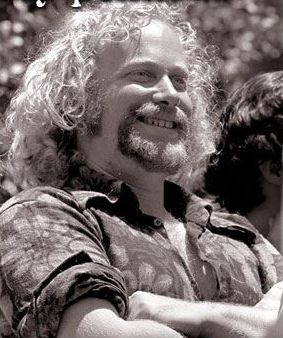
Political activist Stew Albert

Name	Lifetime	Comments
Stew Albert	1939–2006	1960s era activist and co-founder of the Yippies. He died of liver cancer and had previously been diagnosed with hepatitis C, which he successfully treated.
Hank Johnson	1954–	U.S. Representative for the state of Georgia; was declared free of hepatitis C, which ravaged his liver and resulted in depression, thyroid problems, and other health issues, in January 2009. He underwent an experimental treatment to keep the disease in remission.
Robert F. Kennedy, Jr.	1952–	American radio host, environmental activist, author, and attorney; son of Robert F. Kennedy. He was treated for hepatitis C with interferon when he was in rehab in 1983.
Yohei Kono	1938–	Japanese politician. His eldest son, Taro Kono, also a politician, donated part of his liver to save his father's life in 2002.
Mel Lastman	1933–2021	Mayor of Toronto. He contracted hepatitis C from a blood transfusion in 1989.
Kenneth Zebrowski	1946–2007	Member of the New York State Assembly. Contracted hepatitis C from blood transfusion in 1973, but was not diagnosed with it until 1996. His son, Kenneth Zebrowski, Jr., also became an Assemblyman and introduced legislation to fund research and treatment in his honor.

== Science and medicine ==
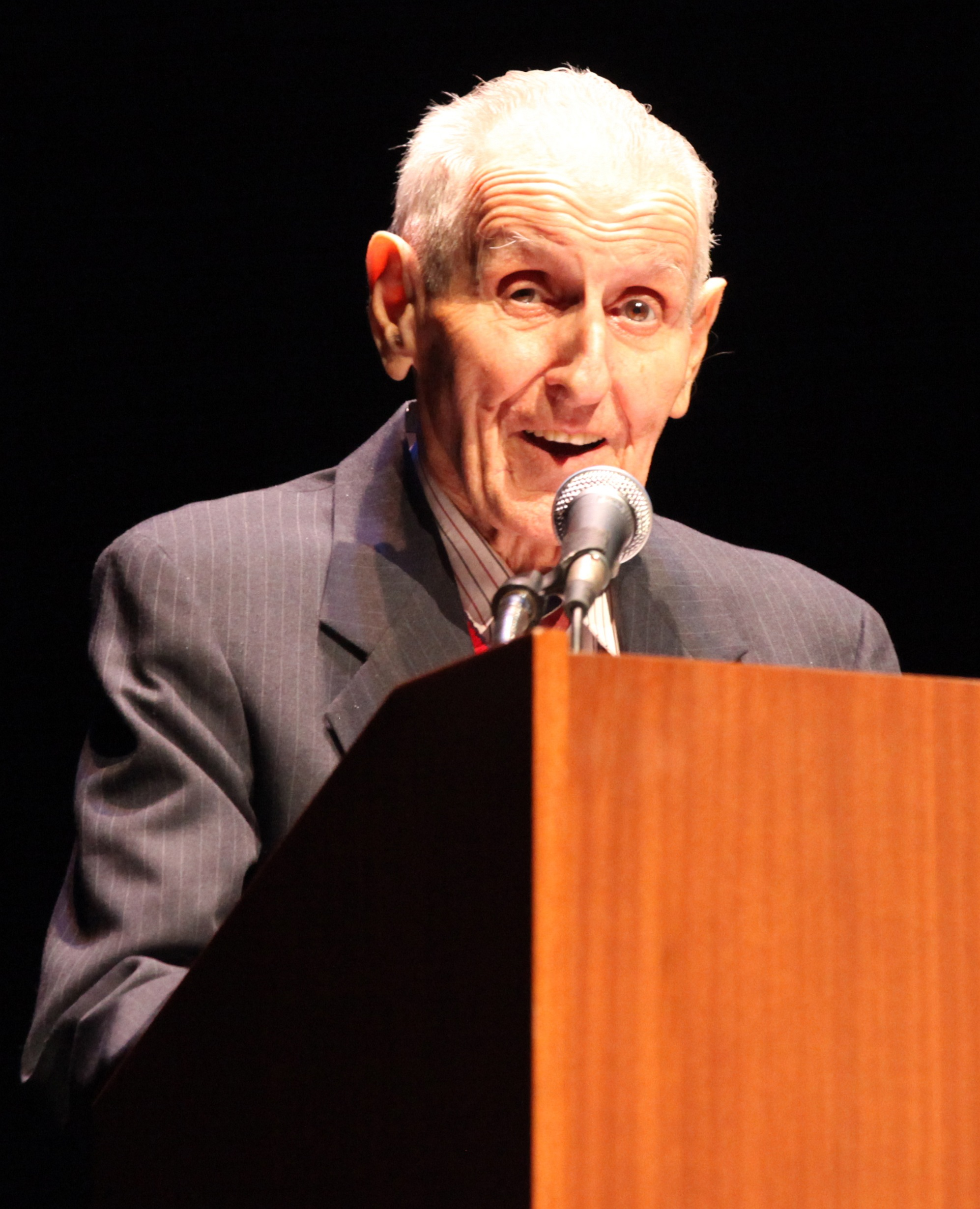
Jack Kevorkian, January 2011

Name	Lifetime	Comments
Jack Kevorkian	1928–2011	Pathologist noted for publicly championing a terminal patient's "right to die". He served eight years in prison for second-degree murder. His attorney claimed Kevorkian contracted hepatitis C after testing blood transfusions during the Vietnam War.

== Sports ==
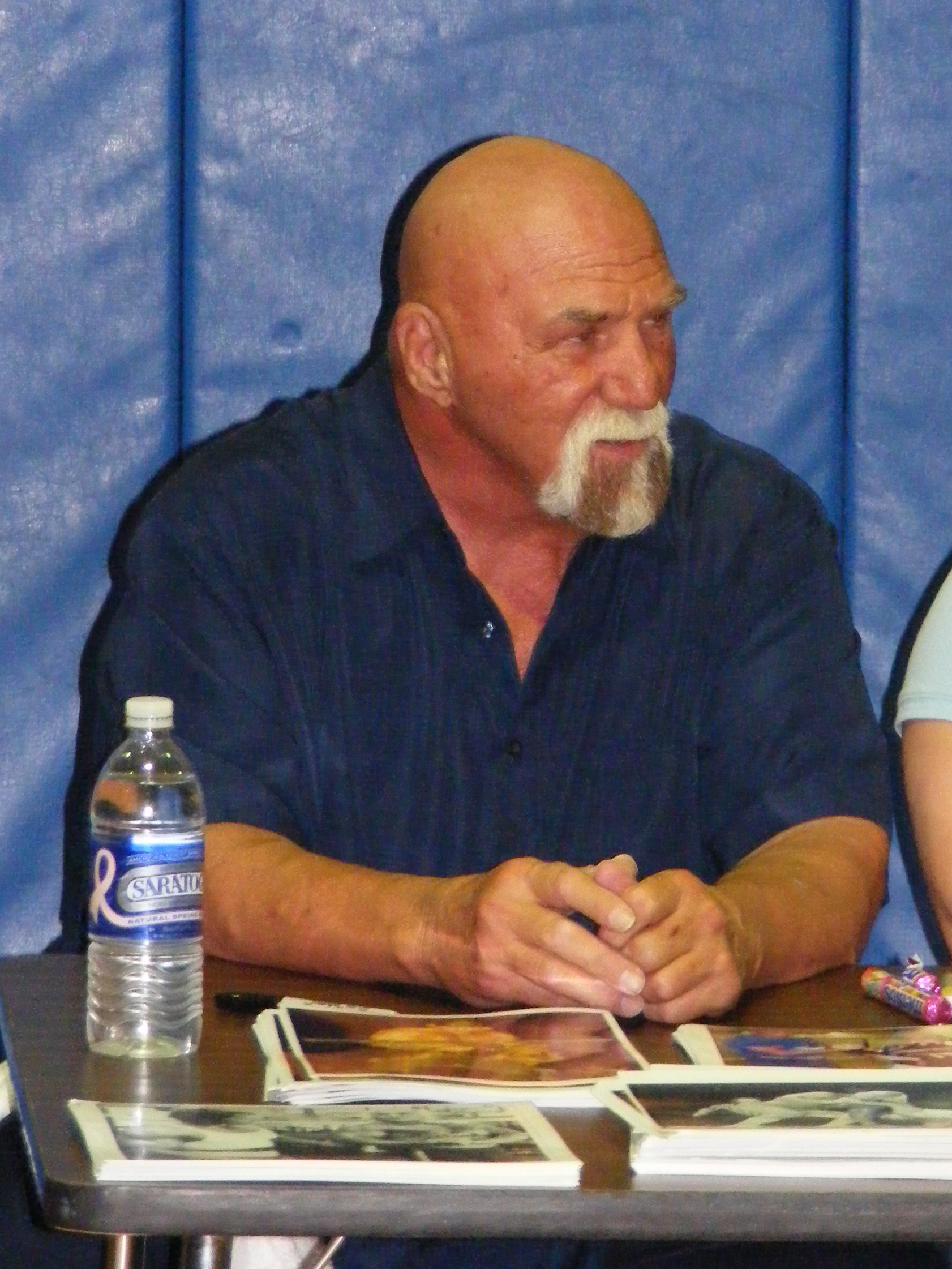
Superstar Billy Graham, 2008

Name	Lifetime	Comments
Rolf Benirschke	1955–	Former placekicker in the National Football League for the San Diego Chargers. Diagnosed in 1998, he was infected by the blood transfusions he received in 1979 to treat ulcerative colitis.
Billy Graham	1943–2023	American professional wrestler. He claims to have contracted hepatitis C "from rolling around the ring in other wrestlers' blood".
Mickey Mantle	1931–1995	Baseball player for the New York Yankees. He underwent a liver transplant in June 1995 but his liver cancer had spread to other parts of his body and he died in August.

== Writing ==
Name	Lifetime	Comments
Penny Arcade	1950–	Performance artist and playwright, diagnosed in 2003. She became an "unofficial spokesperson for sufferers of a disease that often strikes people living on the margins".
Jim Carroll	1949–2009	Author, poet, autobiographer, and punk musician, best known for his 1978 autobiography The Basketball Diaries, which was made in the 1995 film starring Leonardo DiCaprio.
Nik Cohn	1946–	Popular music journalist and critic. He said that having hepatitis C was like having "permanent jet lag".
Allen Ginsberg	1926–1997	Beat poet best known for the poem Howl. He died of liver cancer after suffering for many years with hepatitis C.
Ken Kesey	1935–2001	Best known for his novel, One Flew Over the Cuckoo's Nest. Died of liver cancer, caused by hepatitis C.
Richard McCann	1949–2021	Writer of fiction, nonfiction, and poetry, best known for his book Mother of Sorrows. He was diagnosed in 1990, a few months after the hepatitis C test became available, and received a liver transplant in 1996.
Hubert Selby, Jr.	1928–2004	Author of Last Exit to Brooklyn and other existential novels. He contracted hepatitis C while receiving treatment for tuberculosis.
Jerry Stahl	1954–	Novelist. He was forced to avoid contact with his pregnant wife while on a clinical trial for a new hepatitis C treatment.
Robert Schimmel	1954–2010	Comedian who was known for "taboo-breaking humor of the sexual and scatological variety" who regularly appeared on Howard Stern's radio show. He contracted hepatitis C from a blood transfusion while serving in the Air Force, wrote a book in 2008 about his experiences with cancer, and died in 2010 from injuries sustained in a car accident.
Gene Weingarten	1951–	Pulitzer-prizewinning humor writer and journalist with The Washington Post.
Elizabeth Young	1950–2001	Literary critic and writer.

== Miscellaneous ==
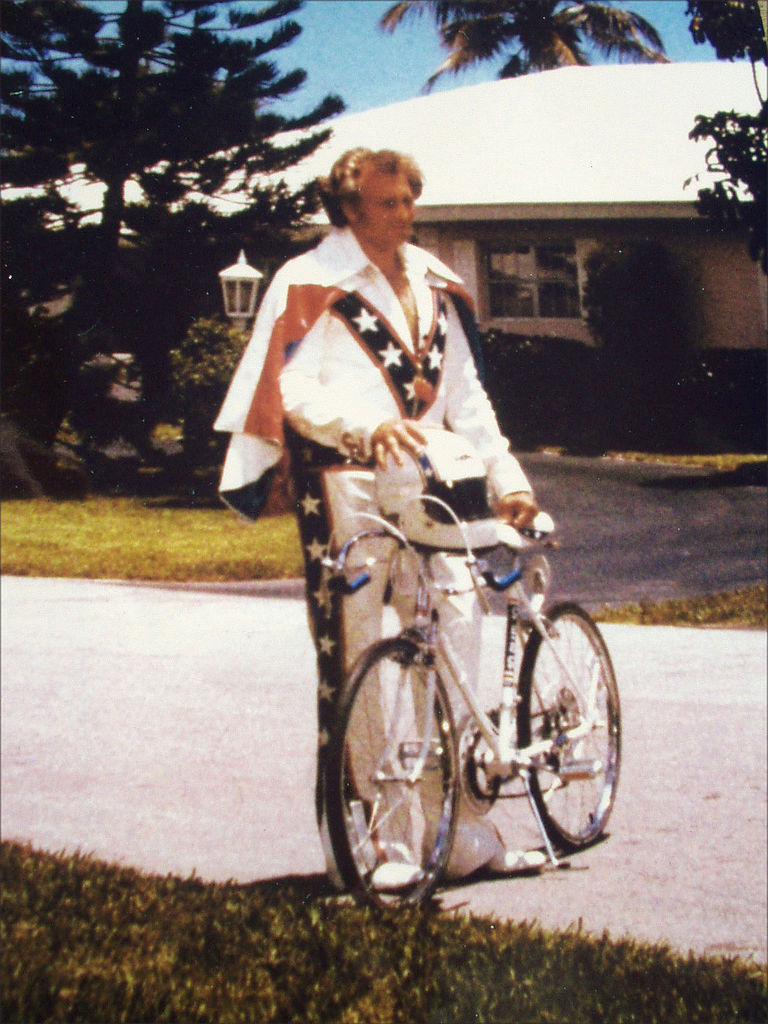
Daredevil Evel Knievel, c. 1979

Name	Lifetime	Comments
Dharmachari Aryadaka	1948–2003	First Buddhist chaplain in Washington state prisons.
Jeannine Parvati Baker	1949–2005	Midwife, herbalist, author and homebirth advocate. She contracted hepatitis C from an injection she received after the birth of her first child in 1970 to prevent Rh disease.
Laurie Bembenek	1958–2010	Ex-Milwaukee police officer accused of killing her husband's ex-wife. She died of liver and kidney failure and hepatitis C.
Evel Knievel	1938–2007	Stuntperson best known for his public displays of long distance, high-altitude motorcycle jumping. He underwent a liver transplant in 1999 after nearly dying of hepatitis C, which he believed he had contracted from a blood transfusion after one of his many violent crashes.
Lance Loud	1951–2001	Best known for his role in An American Family, a 12-part 1973 PBS documentary. Died of liver failure caused by a hepatitis C and HIV co-infection.
James Earl Ray	1928–1998	Confessed assassin of Martin Luther King Jr. Died of liver disease due to hepatitis C.
Chopper Read	1954–2013	Australian criminal and author, who claimed to have contracted hepatitis C from his time in prison. He refused a liver transplant because he said "he did not deserve it".

== See also ==
- World Hepatitis Day
