= Muscha =

German artist and film director

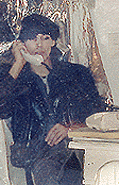
- Born: Jürgen Muschalek; 28 November 1951; Meinerzhagen, Germany
- Died: July 2003 (aged 51)
- Occupations: Film director; artist; musician
- Notable work: Decoder (1984)

Jürgen Muschalek (28 September 1951 – 29 July 2003), known as Muscha, was a German artist and film director. He is known for his cult classic film Decoder.

== Biography ==
Muscha was born in Meinerzhagen, Germany on 28 September 1951. He was a childhood friend of Trini Trimpop, a German rock musician and film director, who directed many projects with him.

He was one of guitarists of the band Charley's Girls and was heavily involved in the punk scene.

He was nominated in 1981, alongside co-director Trini Trimpop, to the Max Ophüls prize for his avant-garde film Humanes Tötem (1980). It was his first feature film.

He eventually moved to Berlin and made his second feature film, Decoder (1984). Many counterculture personalities were involved, including Christiane F, Genesis P-Orridge, FM Einheit, William S. Borroughs, among others. The film was re-released in 2019 by Vinegar Syndrome and it's available to watch in the streaming platform Tubi.

Muscha ended his life on 29 July 2003.

== Filmography ==
=== Short films ===
- Blitzkrieg-Bop (1977)
- Suicide (1978)
- Mirakel Wip (1979)

=== Feature films ===
- Humanes Töten (Humane killing) (1980)
- Decoder (1984)
