= Hollywood Brass =

Hollywood Brass may refer to:

- An episode of CSI: Crime Scene Investigation (season 5)
- An orchestra formed by Jerry Fielding
