= Christiane F. =

German author

- Born: Christiane Vera Felscherinow; May 20, 1962 (age 64); Hamburg, West Germany
- Occupations: Actress and musician
- Known for: Zoo Station: The Story of Christiane F.

Christiane Vera Felscherinow (born 20 May 1962) is a German actress and musician who is best known for her contribution to the 1978 autobiographical book Zoo Station: The Story of Christiane F. (original title: Wir Kinder vom Bahnhof Zoo), and the film and television miniseries based on the book, in which her teenage drug use is documented.

== Early life ==
Christiane Vera Felscherinow was born in Hamburg, then in West Germany, but her family moved to West Berlin when she was a child. They settled in Gropiusstadt, a neighbourhood in Neukölln that consisted mainly of high-rise apartment blocks where social problems were prevalent. Felscherinow's father frequently drank large volumes of alcohol and was abusive towards his two daughters, while her mother was absorbed by an extra-marital relationship.

When she was 12 years old, Felscherinow began smoking hashish with a group of friends who were slightly older at a local youth club. They gradually began using stronger drugs such as LSD and various forms of pills and she ended up using heroin. By the time she was 14, she was heroin-dependent and a prostitute, mainly at West Berlin's then-largest railway station Berlin - Zoo. During this period, she became part of a group of teenage drug-users and sex workers of both sexes.

== Christiane F. ==
=== The book ===
Two journalists from the news magazine Stern, Kai Hermann and Horst Rieck, met Felscherinow in 1978 in Berlin when she was a witness in a trial of a man who paid underaged girls with heroin in return for sex. The journalists wanted to disclose the drug problem among teenagers in Berlin, which was severe but also surrounded by strong taboos, and arranged a two-hour interview with Felscherinow. The two hours extended to two months, as Felscherinow provided an in-depth description of her life, as well as those of other teenagers, in West Berlin during the 1970s. The journalists subsequently ran a series of articles about her heroin use in Stern, based on the tape-recorded interviews with Felscherinow.

In 1979, the Stern publishing house published a book based on the interviews, Zoo Station: The Story of Christiane F. (German: Wir Kinder vom Bahnhof Zoo). The book chronicles Felscherinow's life from 1975 to 1978, between the ages of 12 and 15 years, and depicts several of Felscherinow's friends, along with other drug users, as well as scenes from typical locations of the Berlin drug scene at the time. The narrative of the book is in the first person, from Felscherinow's viewpoint, but was written by the journalists functioning as ghostwriters. Others, such as Felscherinow's mother and various people who witnessed the escalating drug situation in Berlin at the time, also contributed to the book.

The UK issue of the book was released by Corgi on 21 August 1981 under the title H. Autobiography of a Child Prostitute and Heroin Addict and was translated by Susanne Flatauer (ISBN 0552117722 ISBN 9780552117722).

The first American edition of the book was released by Bantam in 1982 under the title Christiane F.: Autobiography of a Girl of the Streets and Heroin Addict, also translated by Susanne Flatauer (ISBN 0553208977). As of October 2013, Felscherinow continues to receive monthly royalty payments close to €2,000 (US$2,720) for the book Christiane F. and the film. In 2013, a new translation by Christina Cartwright was published by Zest Books of San Francisco under the title Zoo Station.

=== The film ===
In 1981, the book was adapted into the film Christiane F. which was directed by Uli Edel and produced by Bernd Eichinger and Hans Weth. The screenplay was written by Herman Weigel and Natja Brunckhorst played the role of the titular character. Its title in Germany was Christiane F. – Wir Kinder vom Bahnhof Zoo, and in English-speaking countries Christiane F.

Much of the movie is shot in the actual surroundings of Gropiusstadt and Bahnhof Zoo. David Bowie, Christiane's favorite singer at the time of the interviews that informed the book, appears as himself in a concert. Bowie also provided the movie's soundtrack that was released in Germany in 1981.

In a December 2013 interview, Felscherinow stated that she attended the German premiere of the film with Bowie, who picked her up in a chauffeured limousine: "I thought David Bowie was going to be the star of my movie, but it was all about me." Felscherinow agreed that the film was an accurate portrayal of her life at the time, but revealed that she does not like the film "that much":

it doesn't describe how I grew up, how I was neglected by my parents. My father was a drinker and he abused my sister and me. He was choleric and my mom just did nothing, She was more into her affair with another man and her beauty. I was so lonely when I was a kid. I just wanted to belong; I was struggling with the world.

== Post-Christiane F. ==
After the initial success of the book and the film, Felscherinow found herself becoming something of a celebrity, both in Germany and other countries in Europe. A subculture of teenage girls in Germany began to emulate her style of dress and spent time around the Bahnhof Zoo, which became an unlikely tourist attraction. This development concerned drug experts in the youth field, who feared that, despite the film's bleakness and numerous drug-related scenes (particularly those portraying the reality of heroin withdrawal), vulnerable teens might regard Felscherinow as a cult hero and role model.

Between 1982 and 1985, Felscherinow lived in Zürich with the Keel family, owners of the Diogenes publishing house. During this time she met Friedrich Dürrenmatt, Patricia Highsmith and Patrick Süskind. In 2013 she explained that she "lived between literature stars and the heroin scene" and described Platzspitz park in Zürich as "like Disney World for junkies"; however, Felscherinow further explained that the area became "a heap of garbage" as people died after contracting the hepatitis C and HIV viruses, and rival gangs engaged in violent conflict.

In the early 1980s, Felscherinow's boyfriend was Alexander Hacke, from the German industrial band Einstürzende Neubauten, and together they released two albums under the moniker Sentimentale Jugend, including a cover version of the Rolling Stones song "Satisfaction", on the Das Cassetten Combinat label. They also appeared together in the 1983 German film Decoder, which also featured William S. Burroughs and Genesis P-Orridge. Felscherinow explained in 2013 that Hacke was a "friend of a friend" who used her residence to hide from the media who were aware of his problematic heroin use at the time. She also stated that she is glad that Hacke's life has become stable: "I'm happy he got rid of his problems and has a family now."

On 10 October 2013, Felscherinow released a new autobiographical book titled Mein Zweites Leben (My Second Life) in which she elaborates on her life following the release of the Christiane F. book. In a promotional interview, prior to the autobiography's release date, Felscherinow revealed her motivation for writing the second book: "No, there's no message [in the book]. It was just that I wanted to make a counterstatement. There was all that junk, all the headlines! I finally wanted to describe what it was really like." However, she counters this statement in a December 2013 interview:

I hope that My Second Life scares people away from taking drugs more than my first book. I'm quite sure it will. It describes how much pain I've had in my life, and [explains] that I will die a very early and painful death.

Felscherinow contracted hepatitis C from an infected needle in the late 1980s. She suffers from cirrhosis of the liver and rejects interferon treatment because of the side effects. In 2013, Felscherinow stated: "I will die soon, I know that. But I haven't missed out on anything in my life. I am fine with it. So this isn't what I'd recommend: this isn't the best life to live, but it's my life."

=== Drug use ===
When Felscherinow was 19 years old, she went to the United States to promote the film about her; she was arrested for heroin and opium possession and had to leave the country.

She lived with her son (born 1996) in Teltow, Germany, but, in 2008 after they both relocated to Amsterdam, Felscherinow temporarily lost custody of her son in August 2008, after authorities intervened in Berlin. In late January 2011, Felscherinow was searched during a drug raid in Moritzplatz, a Berlin subway station then known for its drug market; however, the search did not reveal any drugs.

In an October 2013 interview, Felscherinow expressed her frustration with public perceptions of her since the publication of Christiane F.:

What bothers me most of all is this Christiane F. thing. Is she finally clean now, or not? As if there is nothing else to say about me. And I can't get clean. It's just what everyone else has always expected of me. The doctors complain. But I do have a life, after all.

Felscherinow stated in a December 2013 interview that while she continues to consume methadone and occasionally smokes a cannabis joint, alcohol is her main drug issue at the age of 51 years. In response to a question of why she never discontinued illicit drug use, she explained: "I never wanted to give them up. I didn't know anything else. I decided to live a different life to other people. I don't need a pretence to stop."

== Discography ==
=== Singles ===
- "Gesundheit!" (1982)
- "Final Church" (1982)
- "Wunderbar / Health Dub" (2003)
