= All for our country =

All for our country may refer to:

- "All for Our Country", the motto of Nevada, a U.S. state
- "All for Our Country", a 2003 episode of the American TV show CSI:Crime Scene Investigation
