= Christiane F. (film) =

1981 film by Uli Edel

- Original German theatrical poster
- German: Christiane F. – Wir Kinder vom Bahnhof Zoo
- Literally: Christiane F. – We Children from Zoo Station
- Directed by: Uli Edel
- Written by: Herman Weigel
- Based on: Zoo Station: The Story of Christiane F. by: Kai Hermann; Horst Rieck
- Produced by: Bernd Eichinger; Hans Weth
- Starring: Natja Brunckhorst; Thomas Haustein; Jens Kuphal; Rainer Wölk; Jan Georg Effler; Christiane Reichelt; Daniela Jaeger; Kerstin Richter
- Cinematography: Justus Pankau; Jürgen Jürges
- Edited by: Jane Seitz
- Music by: Jürgen Knieper; David Bowie
- Production companies: Solaris Film; Maran Film; Popular Filmproduktion; CLV Filmproduktions
- Distributed by: Neue Constantin Film
- Release date: 2 April 1981
- Running time: 131 minutes
- Country: West Germany
- Language: German
- Budget: $2.7 million
- Box office: 4.6 million admissions (West Germany)

Christiane F. (German: Christiane F. – Wir Kinder vom Bahnhof Zoo de; lit. Christiane F. – We Children from Zoo Station) is a 1981 West German biographical drama film directed by Uli Edel and starring Natja Brunckhorst, Thomas Haustein, Jens Kuphal, and Rainer Wölk. It depicts the descent of Christiane Felscherinow, a bored and depressed adolescent in 1970s West Berlin, who becomes a teenaged heroin addict, juvenile delinquent, and prostitute. The screenplay is based on the 1978 non-fiction book Zoo Station: The Story of Christiane F., transcribed and edited from tape recordings by Kai Hermann and Horst Rieck.

Released in 1981, Christiane F. was a box-office success in its native country of West Germany, becoming the country's highest-grossing film post-World War II, and was also a commercial success internationally. It was subject to censorship in the United Kingdom, where the British Board of Film Censors mandated that twelve seconds of footage showing intravenous heroin injection be excised. The film developed a cult following, and features David Bowie as both composer and appearing as himself during a concert sequence.

== Plot ==
In 1976, thirteen-year-old Christiane Felscherinow lives with her mother, younger sister, and her pet cat in their small apartment in an unkempt multi-story, concrete social-housing building in a dull neighborhood on the outskirts of West Berlin, Joachim-Gottschalk-Weg 10, 7th Floor. She is tired of living there and is a huge fan of David Bowie. She hears of Sound, a new nightclub in central West Berlin. Although she is not old enough to get in, she dresses up in high heels and makeup, and asks a popular classmate, Kessi, who goes there regularly, to take her. Kessi also provides her with pills.

At the club, Christiane is sexually harassed by various young boys. She meets a slightly older boy named Detlev, who is part of a clique where everybody uses various types of drugs. A day later, they go back to Sound and meet the same clique. They decide to break into a closed shopping mall and steal money from a lottery booth, resulting in the group becoming separated as they evade the police. Detlev and Christiane make it to the roof, get to know each other better, and they are soon joined by the rest of the group.

The next morning, Christiane and Kessi are waiting for the subway when Kessi's mother finds them and angrily berates Kessi, grabbing her by the arm and telling Christiane to stay away from her daughter.

Christiane starts taking LSD, in addition to abusing pills, and befriends a girl her age named Babsi. After attending a David Bowie concert, Christiane tries heroin for the first time. As she falls in love with Detlev, Christiane begins using heroin on a regular basis in order to be close to him, gradually becoming more and more dependent on the drug until she becomes a full-blown addict.

By her 14th birthday, Christiane stops going home and spends more and more time at her cohorts' unkempt apartment, where she and Detlev have sex. She is also drawn to Bahnhof Zoo, a large train and subway station notorious for the drug trafficking and prostitution that takes place in its underpasses and back alleys. Christiane also starts to prostitute herself, imitating Detlev, who sells sex favours to male clients on a regular basis in order to support his heroin addiction.

After being discovered unconscious on the bathroom floor at home due to a heroin overdose, Christiane tries going cold turkey with Detlev, an excruciating experience for both of them. However, they both relapse the moment they revisit Bahnhof Zoo. One day, Christiane and Detlev find their best friend and roommate, Axel, dead in the apartment from a fatal overdose, due to a bad batch of heroin he was sold on the streets that Detlev believes to be strychnine.

To fuel her addiction, Christiane steals from home, sells all her possessions, and sinks to abysmal levels. Christiane and Detlev quickly run away, ending up at the apartment of one of Detlev's male clients. When Christiane walks in on the two having anal sex, she has a breakdown and flees. She returns to the station in order to find Babsi, only to discover that she is dead of an overdose at barely 14 years old. The news of Babsi's tragic death is plastered all over the front pages of many newspapers.

In despair over the deaths of numerous friends, as well as her inability to break free from her heroin addiction, Christiane attempts suicide by overdosing. A voice-over states that Christiane eventually survived her overdose and was taken by her mother to a village near Hamburg to live with her grandmother and aunt. Most of her cohorts had either died or were still addicts, including Detlev, whose whereabouts and current condition were unknown.

== Cast ==
- Natja Brunckhorst as Christiane Felscherinow
- Thomas Haustein as Detlev
- Jens Kuphal as Axel
- Rainer Wölk as Leiche
- Jan Georg Effler as Bernd
- Christiane Reichelt as Babsi
- Daniela Jaeger as Kessi
- Kerstin Richter as Stella
- David Bowie as Himself
- Christiane Lechle as Mrs. Felscherinow

== Production ==
=== Development ===
The film was adapted for the screen by Herman Weigel from the nonfiction book Zoo Station: The Story of Christiane F. by Kai Hermann and Horst Rieck, which recounts the experiences of Christiane Felscherinow, a young woman whose teenage years in 1970s West Berlin were marked by heroin addiction and underage prostitution. Felscherinow first came to public notice after serving as a witness for a trial of a man accused of child sexual abuse. Hermann and Rieck, both journalists reporting on the trial, were intrigued by Felscherinow and tracked her down, tape-recording a series of interviews with her in which she recounted her life. These interviews served as the basis of the book.

Originally the film was going to be directed by Roland Klick, but he was fired only two weeks before shooting after a fallout with producer Bernd Eichinger, after which Uli Edel was hired to direct the film.

=== Casting ===
The cast is composed mainly of first-time actors, most of whom were still in school at the time and have mostly not pursued acting careers since. Natja Brunckhorst is the only cast member who continued to act in German films and television, starting with 1982's Querelle by Rainer Werner Fassbinder, at the time the highest-grossing film with a strongly homosexual theme. The real-life Stella (Catherine Schabeck), aged 18 at the time, has a short cameo as the drug dealer that sells the first dose of heroin to Detlev (Thomas Haustein). Most of the extras at the railway station and at Sound were actual drug users and sex workers.

=== Filming ===
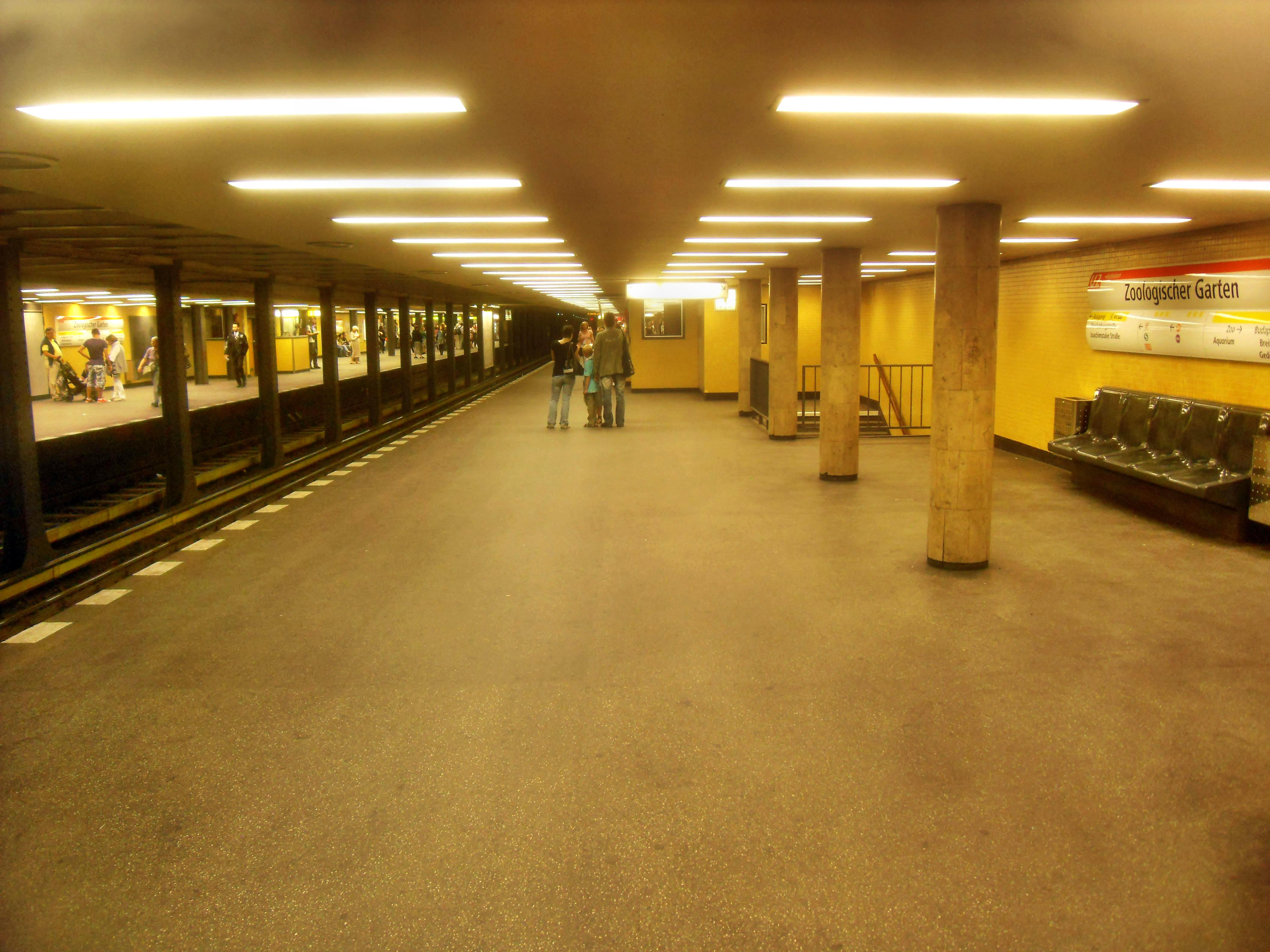
Numerous sequences were filmed in the Bahnhof Zoo subway station

Principal photography of Christiane F. took place in Berlin in 1980, largely in a Gropiusstadt high-rise, the Bahnhof Zoo station, and Tiergarten, all actual locations frequented by the real Christine Felscherinow.

The scenes during the David Bowie concert were filmed in the United States at the Hurrah Club in New York City, where he was performing on Broadway in The Elephant Man several nights a week, deeming a shoot in Berlin impossible, with only some of the crew and cast attending. The close-ups of audience members were sourced from footage of an AC/DC concert in West Germany. The two were spliced together to appear as one event. While the film takes place during his Isolar Tour (1976), the recording used on the film is taken from the live album Stage (1978), recorded during his following concert series.

Natja Brunckhorst recalled a scene which was shot on Kurfürstenstraße where her character is standing alone waiting for someone to pick her up. "It was a long lens shot so the camera team was far away. A car drove up and I was about to get in when I saw, out of the corner of my eye, some of the crew running towards me shouting: 'No! No! No!' And it came to me: this was a real guy, not an actor, trying to pick me up. I almost got into a car with someone who wanted to sleep with a 13-year-old", she said.

In the scene where Christiane (Brunckhorst) runs through the alleys of the station to find Babsi (Christiane Reichelt), the camera lingers on several drug users leaning against the walls of the underpass. In a 2011 interview, Thomas Haustein, who was still in school at the time, recalled how terrified he felt being surrounded by real-life addicts but that he was able to successfully copy their behaviour for his character. It would now be illegal to have minors act in the film's graphic shoot-up, nudity and sex scenes; at the time, however, all the production needed was a written letter of consent from the parents to proceed with filming.

== Music ==
All songs written by David Bowie except "'Heroes'/'Helden'" written by Bowie, Brian Eno and Antonia Maass, "Boys Keep Swinging" and "Look Back In Anger", both written by Bowie and Eno. According to the book, the real Christiane F. had had her first experience with heroin at a David Bowie concert some years earlier. The concert scene was filmed in October 1980 at New York's Hurrah nightclub, which was redressed to resemble a West Berlin nightclub (Bowie was appearing nightly on Broadway at the time so director Edel had to shoot the sequence in New York).

1. "V-2 Schneider"
2. "TVC 15"
3. "'Heroes'/'Helden'"
4. "Boys Keep Swinging"
5. "Sense of Doubt"
6. "Station to Station" (Live)
7. "Look Back in Anger"
8. "Stay"
9. "Warszawa"

== Release ==
Christiane F. premiered in West Germany on 2 April 1981, distributed by Neue Constantin Film. The film was distributed in the United States by New World Pictures, who released it with an English dub, though in some cities it was given a dual release, screening in the English-dubbed version as well as in its original German language with English subtitles.

=== Censorship ===
For its release in the United Kingdom, the British Board of Film Classification forced the filmmakers to cut twelve seconds of footage showing a heroin injection.

=== Home media ===
Image Entertainment released Christiane F. on DVD in North America on 3 July 2001. The Criterion Collection released the film in Blu-ray and 4K UHD Blu-ray formats on October 19, 2026.

== Reception ==
=== Box office ===
Christiane F. recorded 4.6 million admissions in West Germany during its theatrical run, and was the country's highest-grossing film of the post-war era. The film was also a box-office hit internationally.

=== Critical response ===
On the review aggregator website Rotten Tomatoes, 80% of 10 critics' reviews are positive, with an average rating of 7.2/10.

Both the film and the book acquired cult status in Europe immediately after release, raising awareness of heroin addiction. The popularity of the film was increased by David Bowie's concert scenes and as the main contributor to the soundtrack. Bowie's music from his albums made in West Berlin between 1976 and 1979 is played throughout the picture, and as he was at the peak of his popularity during the late 1970s and early 1980s, his presence helped boost the film's commercial success.

Christiane and her friends are seen losing consciousness in decrepit lavatory cubicles amidst urine, vomit and blood, injecting in close-ups, cleaning and re-filling syringes directly from the toilet bowl, vomiting all over themselves and falling asleep right on top of it. In one particularly disturbing scene, a junkie climbs over a public toilet stall to steal Christiane's fix, inject himself in the neck, hand back the used syringe and thank her, in front of the horrified gaze of an elderly woman. The depiction of young addicts from seemingly normal families was particularly alarming. At the time junkies were still perceived in popular culture as much older, wilder characters, such as those depicted in Dennis Hopper's Easy Rider or in Lou Reed's songs. Christiane turns 14 halfway through the film, the same age as her friend Babsi, who fatally overdoses. Christiane's boyfriend Detlev in the film is 15, portrayed by 16-year-old Haustein. None of their companions, two of whom also fatally overdose, are older than 16, as reported by end titles recalling the birth and death dates of the real-life individuals portrayed in the film. The fact that the characters prostitute themselves, both heterosexually and homosexually, at such a young age, revolted audiences.

American film critic Roger Ebert deemed Christiane F. "one of the most horrifying films" he had ever seen and "one of the most unremittingly grim portraits of drug addiction ever filmed. The only American equivalent that comes to mind is Shirley Clarke’s The Connection (1961)." Ebert awarded the film a three and a half out of four-star rating.

== See also ==
- Memento, a novel by Radek John
- For Your Own Good, by Dr. Alice Miller, discusses Christiane F.'s case at length.

== Sources ==
- Baer, Hester (2013). "Producing Adaptations: Bernd Eichinger, Christiane F., and German Film History". In Fisher, Jaimey (ed.). Generic Histories of German Cinema: Genre and Its Deviations. Rochester, New York: Camden House. pp. 173–196. ISBN 978-1-571-13570-4.
- Glynn, Stephen (2022). David Bowie and Film: Hooked to the Silver Screen. Cham, Switzerland: Springer. ISBN 978-3-031-13400-5.
- Pegg, Nicholas (2000). The Complete David Bowie. London, England: Reynolds & Hearn. ISBN 978-1-905-28797-0.
