= Natja Brunckhorst =

German actress

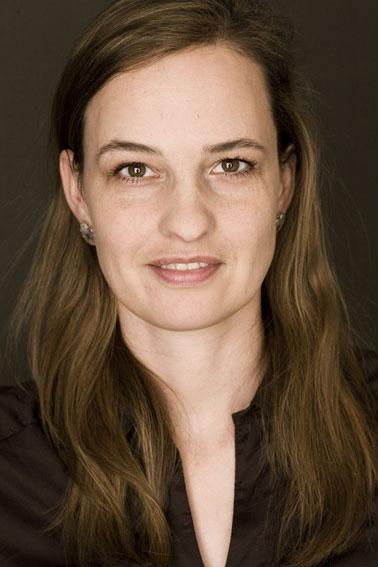
- Brunckhorst in 2009
- Born: 26 September 1966 (age 60); West Berlin, West Germany
- Occupations: Actress; screenwriter; director
- Years active: 1981–present
- Partner: Dominic Raacke (1988–1993)
- Children: 1

Natja Brunckhorst (born 26 September 1966) is a German actress, screenwriter, and director. She came to prominence for her lead role as Christiane Felscherinow in the biographical drama film Christiane F. (1981).

== Early life ==
Brunckhorst was born in West Berlin on 26 September 1966. Her mother was a ballerina and dancer, and her father was a musician who also worked as an accountant and freight forwarder. When Brunchorst was five years old, her mother left their family, after which she and her brother were raised by their single father.

== Career ==
Brunckhorst was 13 years old when she was selected by director Uli Edel for the leading role as Christiane F. in the critically acclaimed 1981 dramatisation of the biographical work Zoo Station: The Story of Christiane F. about Christiane Vera Felscherinow, written following the tape recordings of the experiences of teenage girl Christiane F. The film immediately acquired cult status (which it still retains today) and features David Bowie as both himself and the soundtrack composer, which gave the film a commercial boost. A year later Brunckhorst appeared in Rainer Werner Fassbinder's Querelle (1982). After the unexpected success of Christiane F. - Wir Kinder vom Bahnhof Zoo, in order to avoid public attention she retreated from public life and went to school in England. After a short time in Paris she returned to Germany in 1987 to study at the Schauspielschule Bochum. Since then she has acted on film and television, for example in The Princess and the Warrior, as well as the German TV series Dr. Sommerfeld – Neues vom Bülowbogen.

Following a recovery from cancer which caused a break in her acting career, in 1998, Brunckhorst began working as a scriptwriter, first for the television series Einsatz Hamburg Süd. Her biographical film Never Mind the Wall was awarded the Lola for the best script in 2001. In the same year her first work as a director was published, La Mer, a playful-romantic short film. In addition, she still appears in movies, such as Totem, the only German contribution to the Venice Film Festival in 2011, where she embodied a woman in desperation from the speechlessness of her family.

== Personal life ==
Brunckhorst has one daughter, Emma (born 1991), from a relationship with German actor Dominic Raacke that lasted from 1988 to 1993. She lives in Munich.

Brunckhorst is a member of the high-IQ society Mensa.

== Filmography ==
- 1981: Christiane F. – Wir Kinder vom Bahnhof Zoo
- 1982: Querelle
- 1987: Kinder aus Stein
- 1989: Tiger, Lion, Panther
- 1989: Der Fuchs (TV series, episode 7: Schach und Rauch)
- 1990: Spitzen der Gesellschaft
- 1991: Babylon
- 1993: Die Skrupellosen – Hörigkeit des Herzens
- 1994: Die Kommissarin (TV series, episode 11: Corinna)
- 1995: Eine fast perfekte Liebe
- 1995: Das verletzte Lächeln
- 1995: Pack mich (short)
- 1995: Alles außer Mord: Y.?17
- 1996: Das verletzte Lächeln
- 1997: Virus X – Der Atem des Todes
- 1997: Rendezvous (short)
- 1997: Gone Wrong
- 1997: Kalte Küsse
- 1998: Einsatz Hamburg Süd (TV series, screenplay)
- 2000: The Princess and the Warrior
- 2001: Never Mind the Wall (screenplay)
- 2002: La Mer (director und screenplay)
- 2009: Tatort: Oben und unten (screenplay)
- 2009: Mein
- 2010: Leipzig Homicide: Wut im Bauch (actress)
- 2010: Wie ein Stern am Himmel (screenplay)
- 2011: Totem (actress)
- 2012: Tatort: Dinge, die noch zu tun sind (Idea, screenplay)
- 2017: Amelie rennt (screenplay)

== Awards ==
- Deutscher Drehbuchpreis (German screenplay prize) LOLA 2001: Never Mind the Wall
- Goldener Spatz im Wettbewerb Kino-TV als Bester deutschsprachiger Spielfilm für Kinder (Best German language film for children; Amelie rennt)
