= Martin Pecina =

Czech politician (born 1968)

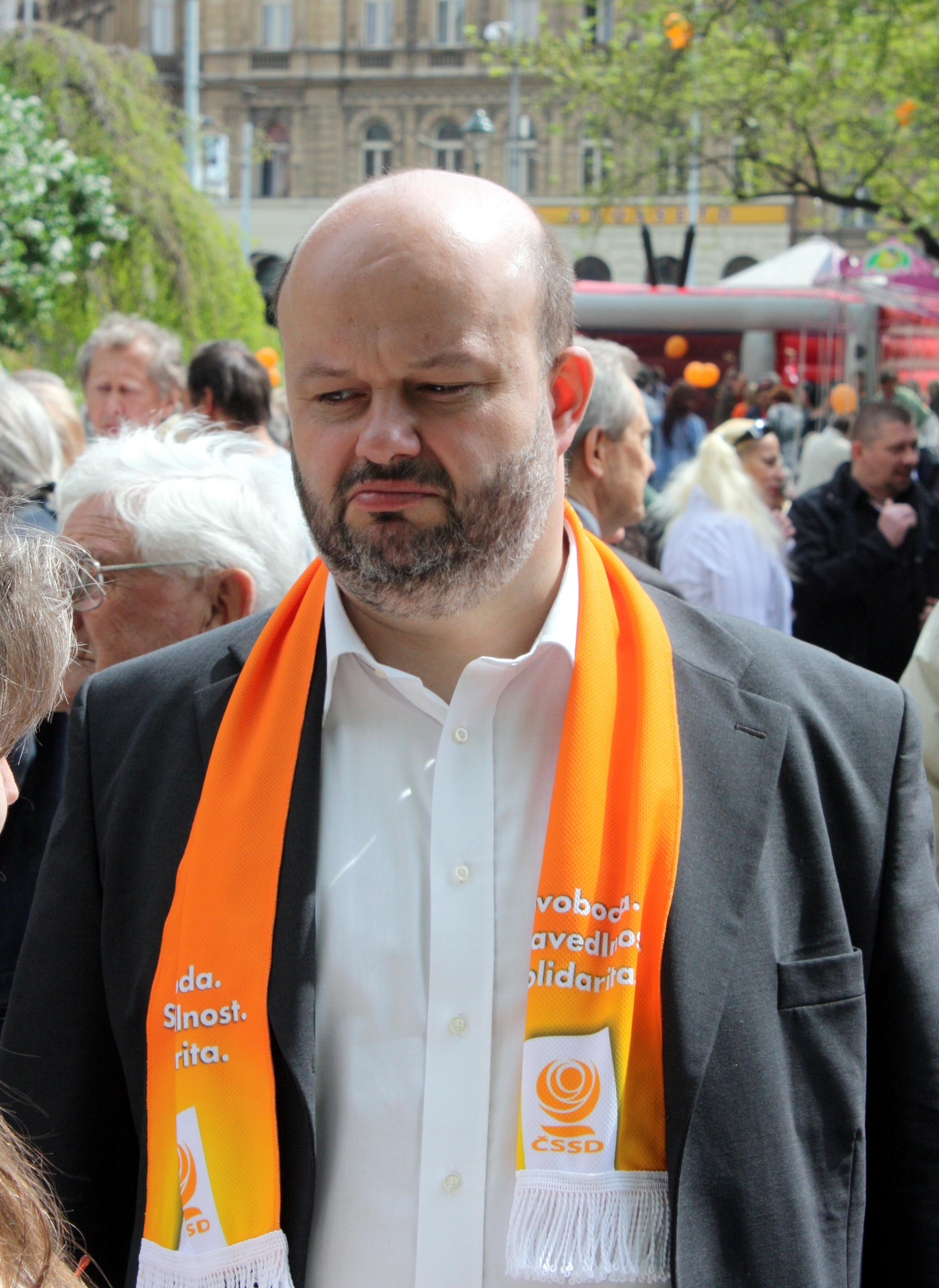

Deputy Prime Minister of Czech Republic
- In office 10 July 2013 – 29 January 2014
- Prime Minister: Jiří Rusnok

Minister of Interior
- In office 10 July 2013 – 29 January 2014
- Prime Minister: Jiří Rusnok
- Preceded by: Jan Kubice
- Succeeded by: Milan Chovanec
- In office 8 May 2009 – 13 July 2010
- Prime Minister: Jan Fischer
- Preceded by: Ivan Langer
- Succeeded by: Radek John

Personal details
- Born: 9 July 1968 (age 57) Český Těšín, Czechoslovakia
- Spouse: Alena Pecinová
- Children: 2
- Profession: politician

Martin Pecina (born 9 July 1968) is a Czech politician, who twice served as the minister of Interior of the Czech Republic. He was the minister of Interior in caretaker governments of Jan Fischer and Jiří Rusnok. He also served as the chairman of the Office for the Protection of Competition.

== Early life ==
Pecina was born in Ostrava. He's a graduate of the Technical University of Ostrava. He worked as a programmer and was Deputy Minister of Industry and Trade from 2003 to 2005 with the Social Democratic Party. Since 2 September 2005, Pecina has been chairman of the Office for the Protection of Competition.

== Ministerial post ==
In May 2009, Pecina became Minister of Interior in the cabinet of the Prime Minister Jan Fischer. He was nominated by the Social Democratic Party.
