= Memento (novel) =

1989 novel by Radek John

- Author: Radek John
- Language: Czech
- Publication date: 1989
- ISBN: 9783351015213

Memento (Warning) is a young adult novel with reporting elements, written by Czech author Radek John and published in 1986. The story is set in Prague in the 1980s. It was made into a film for the Czechoslovak Television in 1990.

== Background ==
The novel is written with literary language with elements of argot and slang of drug addicts. It is a subjective narration from the point of view of Michal, the main character. The author wanted to warn the public of rising drug problems in present days. Its importance lies in the fact it is the first work concerning this taboo theme in the time of the previous totalitarian communist regime in Czechoslovakia. The situation at that time was that the number of addicts was growing, but it had not been publicly discussed. It warns that escaping from problems through drugs will end badly.

== Synopsis ==
When the story opens, readers are introduced to Michal Otava, who is severely addicted to drugs, and who is taken to hospital because repeated injection of intravenous drugs has led to deep inflammation of his veins. His period within hospital care brackets the framework of the story. Michal recollects how he got involved with the narcotics underworld while still at high school. As time goes on, he becomes more deeply addicted.

Michal runs away from home after experiencing unrequited love for his classmate Olina. Given that that leads nowhere, he decides to run away from home with her friend, Honza. However, Michal and Honza are soon caught. Michal's authoritarian father is responsible for an abusive and dysfunctional context at home. Honza and Michal travel to a party of drug addicts in Prague. The addicts are informally led by the charismatic Richard. Michal falls in love with Eva, an addict whom he meets at the party. He then becomes involved within the addict subculture due to his difficulties at home and high school.

At home, Michal's parents are unable to deal with his drug addiction. As a consequence of his deepening addiction, he is expelled from school shortly afterwards. He immediately joins the Czech Army, where he learns to deal with his addiction, leading it to diminish. However, after a year of military service, Michal steals a box of morphine, and he becomes addicted again. After returning from his time within the armed forces, Michal becomes even more deeply addicted to drugs. Michal tries to live in a shared flat with Eva, but drugs permeate their relationship and they cannot tolerate each other's company without it. There are repeated attempts to go 'cold turkey,' but always either Michal or Eva relapse and trapped in co-dependency, they both become mired within the addict subculture once more. When Michal's morphine runs out, the couple rob a pharmacy together. Predictably, they are caught. Neither denies complicity and Eva and Michal are both sentenced to two years in prison.

When he leaves prison, Michal tries to avoid his former social network of addicts. Honza gets in touch with him again, however. She convinces him to produce crystal meth with her. Michal is still codependent with Eva, who is still in prison. Unable to resist, he starts manufacturing crystal methamphetamine and his drug dependency further worsens. Eva is now pregnant with Michal's child, but neither are able to give up drugs. Consequently, unable to deal with parental responsibilities due to her addiction, Eva has an abortion. After her abortion, they drift apart. Michal is repeatedly in prison or a psychiatric hospital over the next several years. However, he never recovers from his addiction. Eva becomes pregnant again and Michal learns that she was poisoned by anhydrous ammonia (used in the manufacture of crystal meth) during that pregnancy. As a consequence, Eva kills herself. Michal is suffering from a severe stomach ulcer due to his crystal meth addiction so he initially disbelieves that Eva has committed suicide. Suffering from narcotic psychosis, he believes that Eva was murdered by someone from the initial addict network in Prague, which is now trying to kill Michal as well. After his latest period in prison, Michal and several neophyte addicts, prepare to avenge themselves against the network. Before he can do so, however, Michal overdoses and ends up in the hospital, which ends his period of recollection.

After he is released from the hospital, Michal continues to take drugs and after another overdose he is found by his mother in a comatose condition. Doctors save him but he has permanent brain damage due to his extensive drug use. Consequently, he is now unable to live independently.

== See also ==
- Christiane F. - Wir Kinder vom Bahnhof Zoo (film)
