= Klaus Maeck =

German film producer (born 1954)

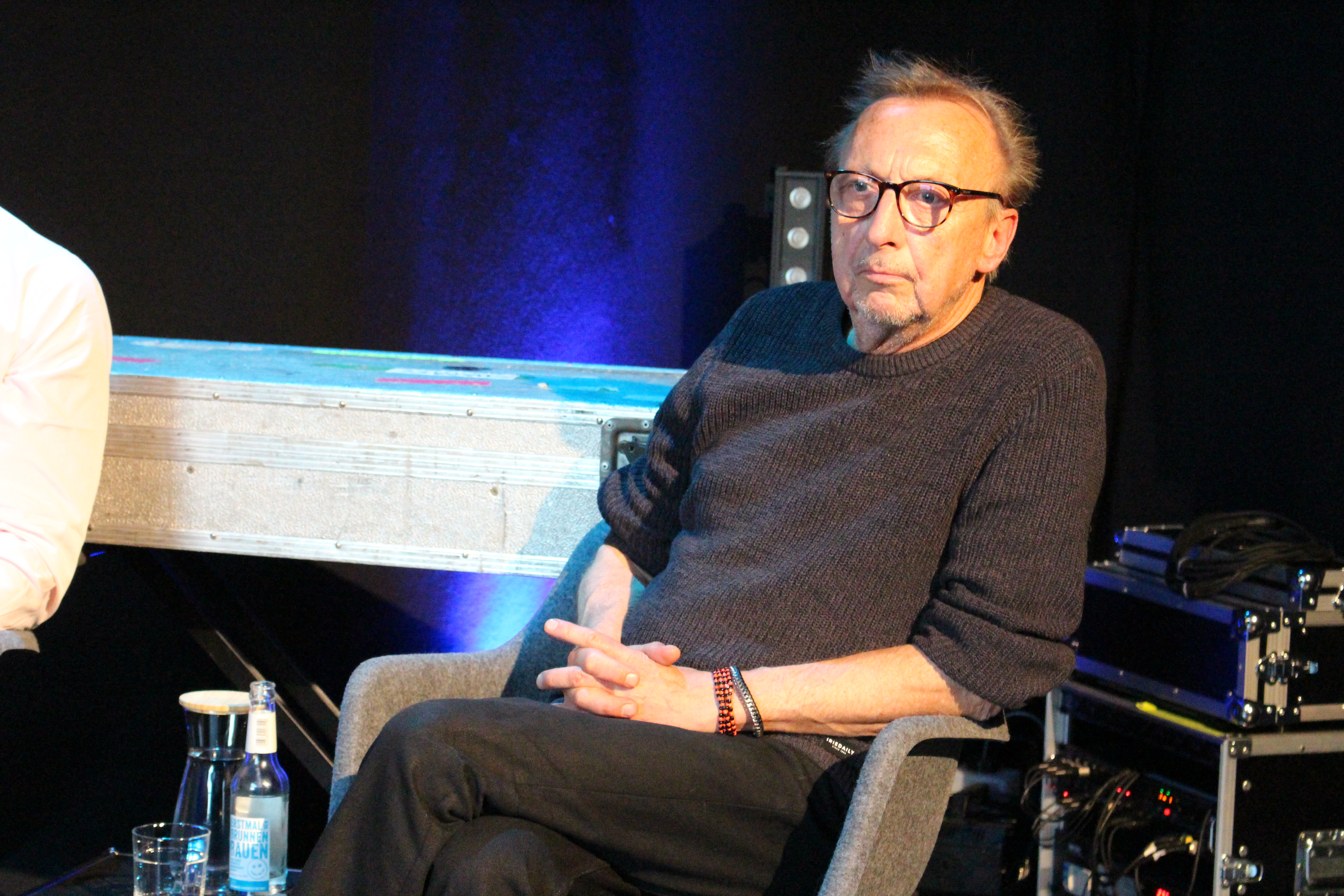
Maeck in 2025

Klaus Maeck (born in Hamburg 28 July 1954) is a German film producer. He is perhaps best remembered for his West German cyberpunk cult classic Decoder. His films have often played at the Berlin Film Festival. Prior to creating Decoder, he was a music and culture journalist in Hamburg, covering the advent of the industrial music scene in the city. His film The Edge of Heaven won the Cannes Film Festival Award for Best Screenplay.

== Filmography ==
- Decoder, (1984)
- Kastrierte Philosophen: Toilet Queen, (1989, short)
- William S. Burroughs: Commissioner of Sewers, (1991)
- Visions of Europe, (2004, segment: Die alten bösen Lieder)
- Crossing the Bridge: The Sound of Istanbul, (2005)
- Takva: A Man's Fear of God, (2006)
- Shaving Hacke, (2006, short)
- The Edge of Heaven, (2007)
- Chiko, (2008)
- Soul Kitchen, (2009)
- Before Your Eyes, (2009)
- UFO in Her Eyes, (2011)
- Blutzbrüdaz, (2011)
- Polluting Paradise, (2012)
- Fraktus, (2012)
- Mamaroš, (2013)
- B-Movie: Lust & Sound in West-Berlin 1979-1989, (2015)
- Anhedonia, (2016)
- Eure Kinder, (2018, short)
- Die Liebe frisst das Leben, Tobias Gruben, seine Lieder und die Erde, (2019)
- Alles ist eins. Ausser der 0., (2020)
