= Permanent Midnight =

- Theatrical release poster
- Directed by: David Veloz
- Screenplay by: David Veloz
- Based on: Permanent Midnight by Jerry Stahl
- Produced by: Jane Hamsher; Don Murphy
- Starring: Ben Stiller; Elizabeth Hurley; Maria Bello; Owen Wilson; Cheryl Ladd; Peter Greene; Janeane Garofalo
- Cinematography: Robert Yeoman
- Edited by: Steven Weisberg; Cara Silverman
- Music by: Daniel Licht
- Distributed by: Artisan Entertainment
- Release dates: September 12, 1998 (TIFF); September 18, 1998 (limited)
- Running time: 88 minutes
- Country: United States
- Language: English
- Box office: $1.1 million

Permanent Midnight is a 1998 independent drama film written and directed by David Veloz. It stars Ben Stiller, Maria Bello, Elizabeth Hurley, Owen Wilson, Cheryl Ladd and Janeane Garofalo. Based on Jerry Stahl's autobiographical book of the same name, it depicts Stahl, a successful TV writer for popular series like thirtysomething, Twin Peaks, and ALF, and his struggles with substance abuse.

Permanent Midnight grossed only $1.1 million in limited theatrical release in the United States, but performed better in the home video market. Stiller's performance was critically acclaimed. A soundtrack album for the film was released on September 15, 1998 from DGC Records.

== Plot ==
Approaching the end of a drug rehabilitation program, Jerry Stahl quits his job at a fast food restaurant on an impulse when an attractive woman named Kitty pulls up at the drive-through window. The two check into a motel, where Jerry tells her about his life between bouts of sex. A series of flashbacks, intercut with their conversations, details his working life to this point.

After moving to Los Angeles from New York City, Jerry, who is already addicted to various prescription medications, becomes friends with fellow addict Nicky. At the urging of Nicky and his girlfriend Vola, Jerry marries Vola's friend Sandra so she can get her green card. Sandra uses her position at a television studio to get Jerry onto the writing staff of the popular comedy series Mr. Chompers. He uses memories from his childhood, including his mother's hysterical grief over his father's death, to fuel his writing.

He juggles his Mr. Chompers job and regular visits to a heroin dealer, Dita. However, his drug use eventually gets him fired. Sandra finds him a new job with a different series, No Such Luck, whose star Pamela Verlaine–herself a recovering addict–sternly but sympathetically insists that he kick his habit first.

As soon as Jerry starts on a methadone program, he runs across a dealer named Gus, who introduces him to crack cocaine and later Dilaudid. His increased drug use costs him his new job, and Sandra throws him out, disgusted at his decision to shoot up when she tells him she is pregnant. Her opinion of him falls even further when he shows up high for the birth of his daughter Nina.

While looking after Nina one night, he gets high and is arrested by the police. The incident causes him to lose custody of Nina; Sandra allows him to visit, but their relationship remains badly strained.

The flashbacks end at this point, with Jerry returning to Los Angeles in hopes of being part of Nina's life. As he begins to resurrect his stalled writing career, he gets a surprise visit from Kitty. The two have one last sexual encounter before she leaves to move to Anchorage.

In the final scene, Jerry appears on a series of talk shows and news programs, while commenting in voice-over about the damage that his addiction has done to his life. "I got out with a bad liver and enough debt to keep me in hock 'til I'm 90, if I'm still here. And with my luck, I will be."

== Cast ==
- Ben Stiller as Jerry Stahl
- Maria Bello as Kitty
- Elizabeth Hurley as Sandra Stahl
- Owen Wilson as Nicky
- Lourdes Benedicto as Vola
- Janeane Garofalo as Jana Farmer
- Fred Willard as Craig Ziffer
- Connie Nielsen as Dagmar
- Liz Torres as Dita
- Peter Greene as Gus
- Cheryl Ladd as Pamela Verlaine
- Sandra Oh as Friend
- Jerry Stahl as Dr. Murphy
- Andy Dick as "Damian", a talk show guest (uncredited)

== Production ==
David Duchovny was originally cast as Stahl, but left the project to do Playing God. It took nine months to secure financing for the film; it was eventually produced and distributed by Artisan Entertainment.

To perfect the role of a heroin addict, Ben Stiller worked closely with Stahl himself and learned about heroin use. Stiller also lost 30 pounds through a liquid diet.

The Mr. Chompers show of the film is based on the TV series ALF.

== Reception ==
=== Release ===
Permanent Midnight premiered on September 12, 1998 at the Toronto Film Festival. It was given a limited theatrical release in the United States beginning on September 18. Its worldwide gross was $1,171,001.

=== Critical response ===
On the review aggregator website Rotten Tomatoes, 59% of 54 critics' reviews are positive. The website's consensus reads: "Aimless storytelling undermines the gripping, unsettling subject of this film." Metacritic, which uses a weighted average, assigned the film a score of 57 out of 100, based on 22 critics, indicating "mixed or average" reviews.

Though response to the film was mixed, critics praised Ben Stiller's against-type performance and the film's dark humor. Michael O'Sullivan of The Washington Post wrote, "As Stahl, Stiller turns in what could easily be the finest performance of a career that, up to now, was devoted mostly to playing an interesting but lightweight assortment of dweebs...this arresting performance, which lurches from buzzing mania to nodding stupor, from glib lies to tongue-tied inarticulateness, is a breakthrough for the talented actor." Kenneth Turan of the Los Angeles Times added, "Though 'Permanent Midnight' can’t be classified as fun, Stiller’s comic energy and timing are essential in providing the film with the numerous bleak laughs that become its trademark."

In a three-star review, Roger Ebert wrote, "The movie gets credit for not making the high life seem colorful or funny. It is not. It is boring, because when the drugs are there they simply clear the pain and allow the mind to focus on getting more drugs. Stahl doesn't seek drugs because he wants to feel good but because he wants to stop feeling bad. It isn't the high that makes people into addicts; it's the withdrawal."

== See also ==
- Bright Lights, Big City
- Prozac Nation
