= Zoo Station: The Story of Christiane F. =

1978 book by Kai Hermann and Horst Rieck

Zoo Station
- Author: Kai Hermann; Horst Rieck
- Original title: Wir Kinder vom Bahnhof Zoo
- Language: German
- Subject: Christiane F.
- Publisher: Stern; Gruner + Jahr
- Publication date: 1978
- Publication place: West Germany
- English publication date: 1980
- Pages: 325
- ISBN: 3570023915

Zoo Station: The Story of Christiane F. (German: Wir Kinder vom Bahnhof Zoo, lit. 'We Children from Station Zoo') is a 1978 book by the German writers Kai Hermann and Horst Rieck.

== Background ==
Kai Hermann and Horst Rieck were journalists at Stern and encountered the then 15-year-old Christiane Felscherinow during a trial against a man who had paid underage girls with heroin in exchange for sex. They interviewed her over a period of two months, which became the basis for the book.

== Summary ==
The book is about the life of the German teenager Christiane F. She moved to West Berlin with her abusive father and absent mother, befriended David Bowie fans who participated in an underground club culture, started to use drugs at the age of 12, became a heroin addict at 14 and resorted to prostitution at the Berlin Zoologischer Garten station to finance her addiction. Her own narrative is complemented with the perspectives of her mother and a pastor from a Berlin youth centre.

== Publication ==
Zoo Station: The Story of Christiane F. was serialised in Stern from September 1978 and published as a book in 1979. It was first published in English in 1980, appearing in the United States as Christiane F: Autobiography of a Girl of the Streets and Heroin Addict and the United Kingdom as H: Autobiography of a Child Prostitute and Heroin Addict. A new translation by Christina Cartwright was published in 2012 as Zoo Station: The Story of Christiane F.

== Reception ==
The book became a bestseller in West Germany. Three years after publication, it had sold 1.3 million copies in German and been translated into ten languages.

== Adaptations ==
The book was the basis for the 1981 film Christiane F. directed by Uli Edel and starring Natja Brunckhorst in the title role. The film was a big commercial success.

It was adapted into the eight-part television serial We Children from Bahnhof Zoo which premiered on Amazon Prime Video in 2021.

== Legacy ==
Christiane F. received much media attention due to the book and the 1981 film. She had an impact on fashion among German girls. She remained a public figure in Germany, with occasional chat-show appearances and newspaper articles about her subsequent life. She published an autobiography in 2013.
