= I, Fatty =

2004 novel by Jerry Stahl

- First edition cover
- Author: Jerry Stahl
- Cover artist: Roger Haskins
- Language: English
- Genre: Biographical, Novel
- Publisher: Bloomsbury Publishing
- Publication date: July 23, 2004
- Publication place: United States
- Media type: Print (Hardback & Paperback)
- Pages: 256 pp (first edition)
- ISBN: 978-1-58234-247-4
- OCLC: 53971687
- Dewey Decimal: 813/.54 22
- LC Class: PS3569.T3125 I15 2004

I, Fatty is a novel by American writer Jerry Stahl published in 2004. The book is a fictionalized autobiography of Roscoe "Fatty" Arbuckle, the famous silent film comedian, and probes his early life in vaudeville, his rise to fame in the movies, and his crash into infamy following a false murder accusation (and three trials and eventual acquittal).
