= Jerry Stahl =

American writer

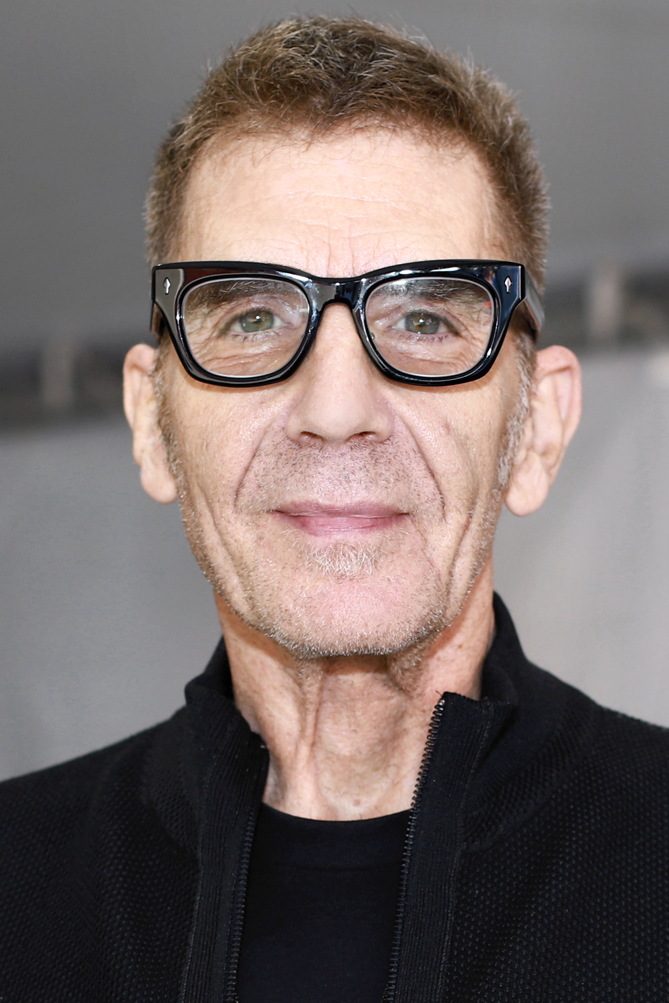
- Stahl at the 2022 Texas Book Festival
- Born: September 28, 1953 (age 73)
- Occupations: Novelist, screenwriter
- Writing career
- Pen name: Herbert W. Day
- Language: English
- Period: 1976–present
- Genre: Transgressive fiction
- Notable work: Permanent Midnight

Jerry Stahl (born September 28, 1953) is an American novelist and screenwriter. His works include the 1995 memoir of addiction Permanent Midnight. A 1998 film adaptation followed with Ben Stiller in the lead role.

His works include memoirs, short stories, TV, films, and novels. He wrote novels including Bad Sex On Speed (2013), Happy Mutant Baby Pills: A Novel (2013), and a short story Love Without: Stories (2007).

== Early life ==
Stahl grew up in Pittsburgh, Pennsylvania. His family is Jewish. His father, David Henry Stahl, immigrated to the United States from the Soviet Union; he served a term as Attorney General of Pennsylvania and was later appointed as a federal judge. David had previously worked as a coal miner.

At the age of 16, Stahl was sent to a boarding prep school near Philadelphia. He attended Columbia University. Post-college he traveled, living in Greece—in caves outside of Matala, on Crete, the streets of Paris, then London, where he landed a job as a bartender at an Irish pub. He later returned to America to live in New York City, where he became a writer.

== Career ==
Stahl began publishing short fiction, won a Pushcart Prize in 1976 for a story that first appeared in Transatlantic Review, and made a living writing for magazines and doing porn stories for cash. One writing job as humor editor for Hustler meant moving to Columbus, Ohio and living at the YMCA until the magazine moved its headquarters to California. Stahl lost his job six months to the day after taking it and ended up on unemployment in California, alongside an escalating heroin dependency, which eventually led to his contracting hepatitis C.

He would go on to become a writer for the 1980s TV series ALF, thirtysomething, and Moonlighting. In 1990 he would also write an episode each for Twin Peaks and Northern Exposure; his work on the former was described by series co-creator Mark Frost as "an absolute car wreck... He turned in a completely incomprehensible, unusable, incomplete script a few days late and as I recall there were blood stains on it." He has also acted in seven films.

Permanent Midnight, his 1995 memoir, was adapted by Stahl into a 1998 film of the same name starring Ben Stiller that raised Stahl's profile and set the stage for his ongoing work in film. He wrote the screenplay for Bad Boys II, which starred Will Smith and Martin Lawrence. His novels Perv: A Love Story and Plainclothes Naked enjoyed moderate success. I, Fatty, a fictional autobiography of legendary movie comedian Roscoe Arbuckle, received a favorable review from Thomas Mallon in The New Yorker and attracted attention from a variety of national media. According to Stahl, Johnny Depp has optioned the film rights for I, Fatty. Stahl edited The Heroin Chronicles (Akashic Books 2013), a collection of stories by various authors.

Stahl has also written a number of CSI episodes which deal with transgressive topics and have been some of the most controversial but also gained some of the highest ratings. He introduced the dominatrix character Lady Heather, who has appeared in a number of episodes, the first of which, "Slaves of Las Vegas", featured viewer discretion advisory warning, due to nudity and sexual content. Stahl has been criticised for his inaccurate portrayal of furries in "Fur and Loathing". However, while earlier episodes of CSI had been criticised for the treatment of transgender people, his episode "Ch-Ch-Changes" was highlighted as offering a sensitive portrayal of the topic. It also got the largest audience to date, 31.5 million, with his "King Baby" being the second most watched that season. That episode dealt with infantilism and the Parents Television Council declared it was the worst television show of the week.

Stahl and Barbara Turner wrote a screenplay for an HBO film about Ernest Hemingway and his relationship with Martha Gellhorn entitled Hemingway & Gellhorn starring Clive Owen and Nicole Kidman. James Gandolfini served as executive producer to the film, which was directed by Philip Kaufman and first aired on HBO on May 28, 2012.

== Works ==
=== Memoir ===
- Permanent Midnight (1995)
- OG Dad (2015)
- Nein, Nein, Nein!: One Man's Tale of Depression, Psychic Torment, and a Bus Tour of the Holocaust (2022)

=== Novels ===
- Perv: A Love Story (1999)
- Plainclothes Naked (2002)
- I, Fatty (2005)
- Pain Killers (2009)
- Bad Sex On Speed (2013)
- Happy Mutant Baby Pills: A Novel (2013)

=== Short stories ===
- Love Without: Stories (2007)

=== Multiple author collections ===
- The Heroin Chronicles (2013) (editor and contributor)

=== Films ===
Film work includes:

- Dr. Caligari (1989)
- Permanent Midnight (1998)
- Bad Boys II (2003)
- Urge (2016)
- Chuck (2016)

As Herbert W. Day:

- Nightdreams (1981)
- Café Flesh (1982)

=== Television ===
- You Again?:
  - "Bad Apples" (1986)
  - "Enid Quits" (1986)
- ALF:
  - "Don't It Make My Brown Eyes Blue?" (1986)
  - "La Cucaracha" (1987)
  - "Mind Games" (1989)
- thirtysomething:
  - "Born to Be Mild" (1988)
  - "Politics" (1989)
- Moonlighting:
  - "Plastic Fantastic Lovers" (1989)
  - "Perfect" (1989)
- Twin Peaks
  - "Laura's Secret Diary" (1990)
- Northern Exposure
  - "Soapy Sanderson" (1990)
- Shades of LA:
  - "Pointers from Paz" (1990)
- CSI:
  - "Justice Is Served" (2001)
  - "Slaves of Las Vegas" (2001)
  - "Felonious Monk" (2002)
  - "The Hunger Artist" (2002)
  - "Fur and Loathing" (2003)
  - "Getting Off" (2004)
  - "Ch-Ch-Changes" (2004)
  - "King Baby" (2005)
  - "Pirates of the Third Reich" (2006)
  - "Way To Go" (2006)
- Hemingway & Gellhorn (2012 HBO movie)
- Maron
  - "White Truck" (2014)
  - "Professor of Desire" (2015)
  - "Anti-Depressed" (2015)
  - "Spiral" (2015)
  - "The 13th Step" (2016)
  - "Sobriety Bush" (2016)
  - "Bookstore" (2016)
- Escape at Dannemora (2018 Showtime miniseries)
  - "Part 3"
  - "Part 6" (with Brett Johnson and Michael Tolkin)

== See also ==
- List of people with hepatitis C
