= Decoder (film) =

1984 West German film

- Theatrical release poster
- Directed by: Muscha
- Written by: Klaus Maeck; Muscha; Volker Schäfer; Trini Trimpop
- Produced by: Klaus Maeck; Muscha; Volker Schäfer; Trini Trimpop
- Starring: Bill Rice; F.M. Einheit; Christiane F.
- Cinematography: Johanna Heer
- Edited by: Jonathon Braun; Klaus Maeck; Muscha; Volker Schäfer; Eva-Maria Will
- Production company: Fett Film
- Distributed by: Freunde der Deutschen Kinemathek
- Release date: 19 February 1984 (West Germany)
- Running time: 87 minutes
- Country: West Germany
- Languages: German; English; Portuguese

Decoder is a 1984 West German film directed by Muscha. It is a cyberpunk and counter-cultural film loosely based on the writings of William S. Burroughs, who also acts in the film.

== Plot ==
The film follows Jaeger ("Hunter", played by Bill Rice), a government agent tasked with suppressing dissent. His efforts are disrupted when a musician (F.M. Einheit) discovers that replacing the calming background music at a burger shop with abrasive industrial music can spark riots, setting off a revolution.

== Production ==
Decoder was made on a small budget and written by Muscha, Klaus Maeck, Volker Schäfer, and Trini Trimpop. Despite its limited resources, the production attracted a number of notable figures from the countercultural and industrial music scenes. The cast includes William S. Burroughs, Genesis P-Orridge, and Christiane Felscherinow. Bands whose music was featured in the film include Soft Cell, Psychic TV, Einstürzende Neubauten, and The The.

== Cast ==
- F.M. Einheit as F.M.
- Bill Rice as Jaeger
- Christiane F. as Christiana
- Berthold Bell as H-Burger trainer (credited as Britzhold Baron de Belle)
- Matthias Fuchs as H-Burger manager
- William S. Burroughs as Old Man
- Genesis P-Orridge as High Priest
- Ralf Richter

== Home media ==
The film was considered "oddly forgotten" and remained largely inaccessible for many years. In 2019, it was re-released on Blu-ray and DVD by Vinegar Syndrome.

== See also ==
- The Electronic Revolution by William S. Burroughs
