= Fur and Loathing =

- CSI: Crime Scene Investigation episode
- Episode no.: Season 4 Episode 5
- Directed by: Richard J. Lewis
- Written by: Jerry Stahl
- Original air date: October 30, 2003

Episode chronology
← Previous "Feeling the Heat"	Next → "Jackpot"

"Fur and Loathing" is the fifth episode of the fourth season of the American crime drama television series CSI: Crime Scene Investigation, and the 74th episode overall. Written by Jerry Stahl and directed by Richard J. Lewis, the episode first aired on CBS on October 30, 2003. The episode was influential in introducing many outsiders to the furry fandom.

== Plot ==
Gil Grissom and Catherine Willows investigate the death of a female driver in a collision between her Mercury Sable and a large eighteen-wheel truck. In the process they find another victim, a man in a raccoon fursuit named Robert Pitt. Their evidence leads the two to attend a fictional Plushies and Furries Convention named PAFCON, where Grissom and Willows discover there is more going on among the attendees than just dressing up.

Meanwhile, Nick Stokes and Sara Sidle investigate a case where a man has been found shot dead and frozen to the floor of a cold storage room. A distraught man arrives at the station to report that he had been kidnapped because he had witnessed the murder and was stuffed in a trunk until he escaped.

== Reception ==
Toronto-based filmmaker Michael McNamara, who had been working on his own documentary episode on furry fandom, said the CSI episode "portrayed the community as a community of sexual deviants who like to have sex in fur costumes" and expressed concern that "it winds up giving the whole fandom a bad name, which made them nervous and camera-shy, so it was tricky to get their trust". He wrote that the deviancy "probably represents about two percent of fandom but it’s the one obviously that the press always gleefully jumps." Greg Gaudio of The Virginian-Pilot wrote that "The steamier side of the Furry Fandom – sexual behavior involving animal costumes and stuffed animals – has grabbed media attention in recent years, most notably as the subject of a 2003 episode of CSI: Crime Scene Investigation. The episode showed attendees at a furry convention engaging in a costume-clad orgy"; however, one of the furry fandom attendees he interviewed replied that such behavior "only involves a tiny percentage of furries and is not something that’s part of the local scene."

== See also ==
- Furry fandom public perception and media coverage
