= Jan Kubice =

Czech politician

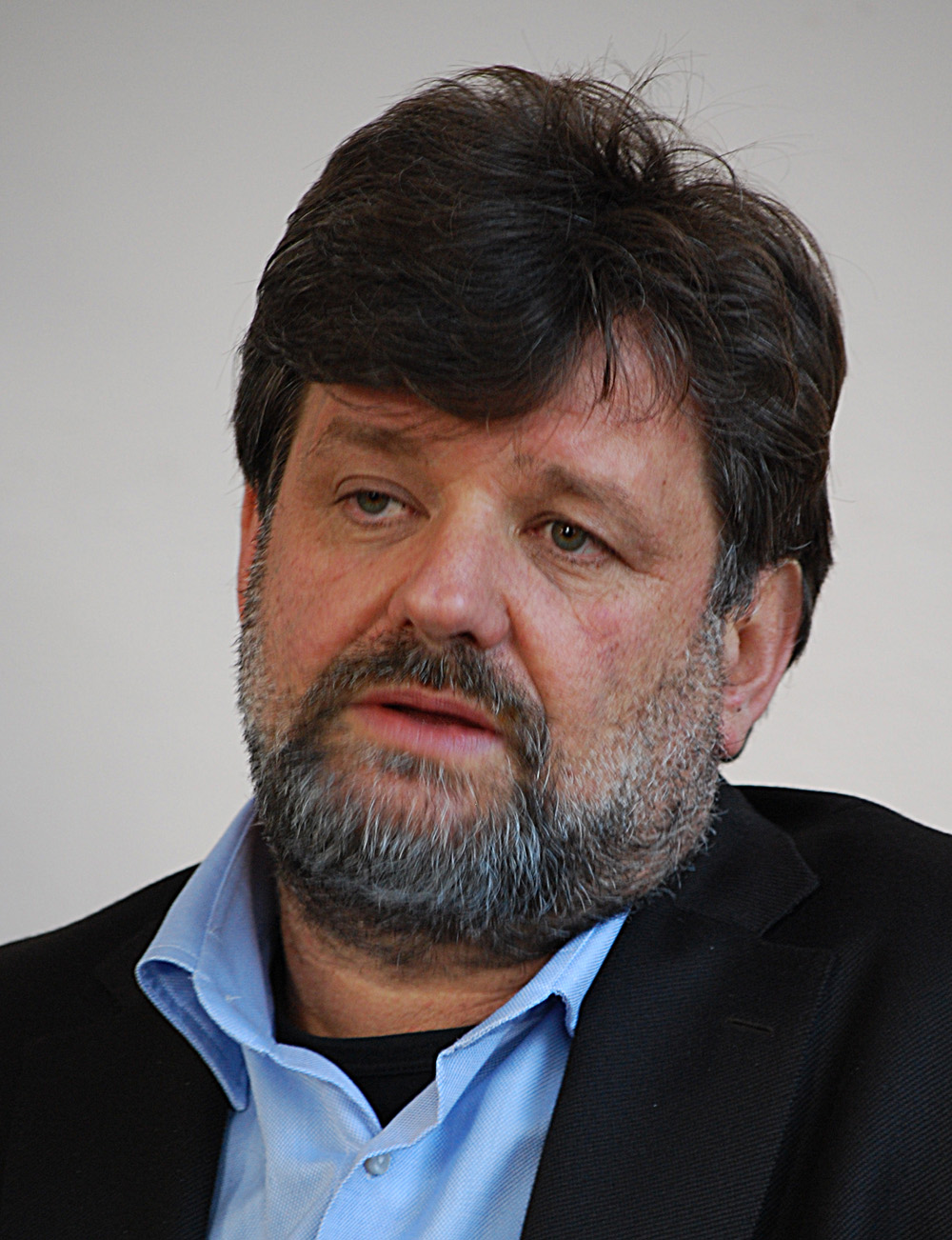
- Jan Kubice in 2008

Minister of the Interior
- In office 22 April 2011 – 10 July 2013
- Prime Minister: Petr Nečas
- Preceded by: Radek John
- Succeeded by: Martin Pecina

Personal details
- Born: 3 October 1953 (age 72) Czechoslovakia
- Party: Independent

Jan Kubice (born 3 October 1953) is a Czech politician, who served as Minister of the Interior of the Czech Republic from April 2011 to July 2013. He was previously in charge of the Unit for Combating Organised Crime (Czech: Útvar pro odhalování organizovaného zločinu, ÚOOZ).
