= CSI: Crime Scene Investigation season 5 =

American TV show season

CSI: Crime Scene Investigation
- Season 5
- Season 5 U.S. DVD cover
- Starring: William Petersen; Marg Helgenberger; Gary Dourdan; George Eads; Jorja Fox; Eric Szmanda; Robert David Hall; Paul Guilfoyle
- No. of episodes: 25

Release
- Original network: CBS
- Original release: September 23, 2004 – May 19, 2005

Season chronology
- ← Previous; Season 4 Next → Season 6

The fifth season of CSI: Crime Scene Investigation premiered on CBS on September 23, 2004, and ended May 19, 2005. The series stars William Petersen and Marg Helgenberger.

== Plot ==
Greg begins his journey from a lab rat to a field mouse, as the Las Vegas Crime Lab faces a personnel overhaul ("Ch-Ch-Changes"), during the fifth season of CSI. The team's final days together are plagued with more investigations into the insane and the unusual, including the discovery of an "alien" corpse just outside the boundary of Area 51 ("Viva Las Vegas"), a body washed up in a thunderstorm ("Down the Drain"), the kidnapping of a thirteen-year-old girl ("Harvest"), a death at a fumigation ("Crows Feet"), a swingers party ("Swap Meet"), the return of the Blue Paint Killer ("What's Eating Gilbert Grissom?"), and a kidnapping at a hotel ("Formalities"). It's the appearance of new evidence that appears literally as Grissom is on the witness stand, however, that causes Ecklie to separate Grissom and Willows' team ("Mea Culpa"), with Catherine, Nick, and Warrick delving into cases such as brain death ("No Humans Involved"), a body in a car ("Who Shot Sherlock?"), a severed head containing a snake ("Snakes"), the death of a bear ("Unbearable"), and a murder involving sports betting ("Big Middle"). The risk of losing of one of their own, however, allows Ecklie and Grissom to set aside their differences, both personal and professional, and reunite the team once again ("Grave Danger").

== Cast ==
=== Main cast ===
- William Petersen as Gil Grissom, a CSI Level 3 Supervisor
- Marg Helgenberger as Catherine Willows, a CSI Level 3 Supervisor
- Gary Dourdan as Warrick Brown, a CSI Level 3
- George Eads as Nick Stokes, a CSI Level 3
- Jorja Fox as Sara Sidle, a CSI Level 3
- Eric Szmanda as Greg Sanders, a CSI Level 1
- Robert David Hall as Al Robbins, the Chief Medical Examiner
- Paul Guilfoyle as Jim Brass, a Homicide Detective Captain

=== Recurring cast ===
- Archie Kao as Archie Johnson
- David Berman as David Phillips
- Wallace Langham as David Hodges
- Aisha Tyler as Mia Dickerson
- Louise Lombard as Sofia Curtis
- Marc Vann as Conrad Ecklie
- Jason Segel as Neil Jansen
- James Patrick Stuart as Adam Matthews

== Episodes ==
No. overall	No. in season	Title	Directed by	Written by	Original release date	Prod. code	US viewers (millions)
93	1	"Viva Las Vegas"	Danny Cannon	Danny Cannon & Carol Mendelsohn	September 23, 2004	501	30.57
Grissom works on a nightclub shooting with Greg Sanders, who has finally found a replacement in the lab and now only has to pass his final proficiency test; however, the replacement lab rat was proven to be a greenhorn, as did Greg himself, as Grissom pointed out several errors during his first field visit. Also: Catherine investigates a stripper found dead in a hotel room, Warrick investigates a man found electrocuted in his bathtub, and Sara and Nick are called in when an 'alien' is found in a shallow grave near Area 51. (Guest starred French Stewart.)
94	2	"Down the Drain"	Kenneth Fink	Naren Shankar	October 7, 2004	502	28.43
The CSIs investigate when a thunderstorm washes up a body in the city storm drains. Murder is soon ruled out but the team makes another disturbing discovery: human bones that may have come from a murder. The only problem is locating where the body was dumped. Once they did find the origin, they would encounter an even bigger problem when the house they were investigating was rigged with explosives. (Guest starred Jack Carter.)
95	3	"Harvest"	David Grossman	Judith McCreary	October 14, 2004	503	28.89
The CSIs investigate the kidnapping of a 13-year-old girl at the parking lot of a convenience store, which turns into a very disturbing murder. Catherine attempts to re-assert her role as a mother when her daughter Lindsey is picked up by the police for hitchhiking; when she still fails to listen, Catherine gives her the "Scared Straight" treatment at the morgue. (Guest starred America Ferrera.)
96	4	"Crow's Feet"	Richard J. Lewis	Josh Berman	October 21, 2004	504	26.54
When two apparently unrelated women die under the same circumstances, with one of them mistakenly determined to have contracted ebola, Catherine and Nick discover that both women underwent various cosmetic procedures and a holistic dietary regimen at a local spa. Meanwhile, Grissom, Sara and Greg investigate when a man is found dead in a house fumigated for termites.
97	5	"Swap Meet"	Danny Cannon	David Rambo & Naren Shankar & Carol Mendelsohn	October 28, 2004	505	29.60
Grissom, Sara and Greg investigate when a woman is found dead in the fountain of a gated community, after visiting a neighborhood swingers party. Meanwhile, Warrick and Nick investigate the murder of a landlord in a video arcade, which develops into a double homicide; as that case revealed new evidence and leads, a man who specializes in cleaning up crime scenes was starting to get inpatient. Later, Catherine requests the position of day shift supervisor from Grissom.
98	6	"What's Eating Gilbert Grissom?"	Kenneth Fink	Sarah Goldfinger	November 4, 2004	506	30.58
While investigating a chopped up body in the university grounds, the team finds out that they're dealing with "The Blue Paint Killer" again. The case gets confusing when the team discovers that the victim was male. Shortly after that they find another body, that of a female. Eventually, they would find its prime suspect: a pornographic comic artist who draws the final moments of the killer's victims. Can they stop the killer before he kills again?
99	7	"Formalities"	Bill Eagles	Dustin Lee Abraham & Naren Shankar	November 11, 2004	507	29.64
At a dinner for a retiring Assistant Supervisor, he names day shift supervisor Conrad Ecklie as his successor. But as Grissom was about to make a speech to talk about Ecklie, he was called into action when a high school student is found dead in a hotel room after a party. Assisted by Catherine, Nick, Warrick and day shift CSI Sofia Curtis (Louise Lombard, in her first appearance), they find out that another girl had been kidnapped from the party. However, the father of this girl doesn't seem overly concerned about his daughter's disappearance. Absent: Sarah Sidle
100	8	"Ch-Ch-Changes"	Richard J. Lewis	Jerry Stahl	November 18, 2004	508	31.46
The CSI team investigate when a woman is found stabbed to death after being stopped by a police officer. They soon discover that the woman was in the process of making public proof of an underground sex change operation in Las Vegas. They soon delve into the world of the transgender community to find the killer.
101	9	"Mea Culpa"	David Grossman	Story by : Carol Mendelsohn & Josh Berman; Teleplay by : Josh Berman	November 25, 2004	509	24.38
When an unknown fingerprint suddenly appears on a piece of evidence in court, Grissom must re-open the case and find the real culprit. However, this unexplained phenomenon causes Assistant Supervisor Ecklie to doubt Grissom's handling of the case. Ecklie then opens an inquiry on Grissom, and questions each of the CSIs about his effectiveness as supervisor. Meanwhile, Sara and Greg investigate the circumstances surrounding the death of a man who shot himself in the leg. After the investigation, Ecklie decides to split up the team. He gives Catherine the role of Swing Shift Supervisor despite Catherine applying for days, and assigns Warrick and Nick to her while Grissom's team consists of Sofia, Greg and Sara.
102	10	"No Humans Involved"	Rob Bailey	Judith McCreary	December 9, 2004	510	29.83
In their first assignments after the split, Grissom and his team work on a case of a young boy found dead in a storage tote, eventually discovering that he died of neglect, and his siblings may also be in danger. Meanwhile, Catherine and her team try to find out why an inmate was left brain dead after an action by police.
103	11	"Who Shot Sherlock?"	Kenneth Fink	David Rambo & Richard Catalani	January 6, 2005	511	28.86
Greg is doing his final proficiency test and he has one more case to solve. Ironically, he investigates the death of a Sherlock Holmes wannabee who is obsessive to the point of recreating the great detective's living room in his home; he died from a close-range gunshot wound. The murder weapon is not found at the scene, although all of the other pieces of evidence suggest that it was a suicide. Despite some flaws, Greg would pass his test, resulting in him being promoted to CSI Level 1, thus finally fulfilling his dream of going out into the field. Meanwhile, Catherine, Nick and Warrick work on a case of a dead man found in his Jeep which veered off the highway; while Dr. Robbins could not find any answers in the autopsy, Nick and Warrick would determine that the driver died of a freak instance of electrocution.
104	12	"Snakes"	Richard J. Lewis	Dustin Lee Abraham	January 13, 2005	512	27.55
When a newsboy for a Spanish-language newspaper discovered a severed head containing a snake in a newspaper dispenser, Catherine and Nick go deep into a murder investigation involving a norteño music group. Meanwhile, Warrick, Sofia and Greg investigate a shooting in a van.
105	13	"Nesting Dolls"	Bill Eagles	Sarah Goldfinger	February 3, 2005	513	24.96
When two bodies encased in hardened tar are found at a construction site, the CSIs must try to uncover their identities and that of the murderer. Meanwhile, Ecklie reprimands Sara for misconduct, calling her a "loose cannon with a gun" for her frustrations after the staffing changes; Grissom sympathizes with her, which led to Ecklie concluding where her demeanor came from.
106	14	"Unbearable"	Kenneth Fink	Josh Berman & Carol Mendelsohn	February 10, 2005	514	27.85
Catherine and her team investigate when a hunter and a Kodiak bear are found dead in the mountains. Meanwhile, Grissom's team look into the death of a young mother. (Guest starred Jane Lynch as a park ranger. Also features Jon Wellner's first appearance in the series as zookeeper and suspect Sam Tracy.)
107	15	"King Baby"	Richard J. Lewis	Jerry Stahl	February 17, 2005	515	30.72
When Grissom's and Catherine's teams work together to investigate the death of a famous casino owner, their investigation leads them to the bizarre world of infantilism. During the investigation, Catherine discovers that her pictures had been stolen, only for them to end up on a local newscast for all the public to see. (Guest starred Edie McClurg.)
108	16	"Big Middle"	Bill Eagles	Story by : Dustin Lee Abraham; Teleplay by : Naren Shankar & Judith McCreary	February 24, 2005	516	28.11
Grissom and his team are looking for a murderer of a man found dead in a hotel room, leading them to a convention for plus-sized people. Catherine and her team investigate the world of sports betting when a man is found dead in the woods with a gaping chest wound and his face blown off. (Guest starred Steve Lawrence.)
109	17	"Compulsion"	Duane Clark	Josh Berman & Richard Catalani	March 10, 2005	517	29.40
Grissom and his team investigate a case where a stewardess has been violently raped and stabbed to death in her hotel room, in which Ecklie discovers parallels to a five-year-old cold case. Catherine's team assists Detective Cavaliere in the investigation of a young boy beaten to death in his own bed, but Nick and Cavaliere get into a bitter disagreement over their methods of finding the culprit. (Guest starred Wil Wheaton.)
110	18	"Spark of Life"	Kenneth Fink	Allen MacDonald	March 31, 2005	518	28.22
Greg, Sara and Grissom investigate a scene of a bush fire which led to the death of a man who was there stargazing, and a woman nearby who was barely alive with third degree burns over much of her body; they later found out that the woman was pregnant, with her unborn child still alive. Also: Catherine, Nick and Warrick solve a case involving the death of an entire family: the father is found dead on his bed, apparently from suicide; the mother was shot while running downstairs; and their little daughter drowned to death in the pool.
111	19	"4x4"	Terrence O'Hara	Story by : Sarah Goldfinger & Naren Shankar; Teleplay by : Dustin Lee Abraham & David Rambo	April 14, 2005	519	27.54
It's a busy night in the lab as the CSIs investigate four cases: A hit and run involving a Hummer stolen from a couple who won it at a car show raffle, the murder of a model from the same car show who was apparently killed while trying to spermjack a client, the death of a body builder, and a 13-year-old boy found dead on a bus stop bench, who earlier died in a laundromat dryer after a stunt gone wrong.
112	20	"Hollywood Brass"	Bill Eagles	Sarah Goldfinger & Carol Mendelsohn	April 21, 2005	521	27.02
Captain Jim Brass travels to Los Angeles after his daughter Ellie asks for a favor in investigating her friend's disappearance. There, with the help of Warrick, who is in LA for a conference and a friend in LAPD, Brass finds his investigation interrupted by higher powers. While he and Warrick are ultimately able to find Ellie's friend's murderer, Brass is unable to bring the perpetrator to trial. Disappointed, he leaves LA and returns to Las Vegas. (Ellie is portrayed by Teal Redmann, who would assume the role for the remainder of the series.) Absent: Gil Grissom (William Petersen), Catherine Willows (Marg Helgenberger), Greg Sanders (Eric Szmanda) and Sarah Sidle (Jorja Fox).
113	21	"Committed"	Richard J. Lewis	Story by : Sarah Goldfinger & Uttam Narsu; Teleplay by : Richard J. Lewis	April 28, 2005	520	23.68
Sara accompanies Grissom to a mental hospital where one of its inmates has been murdered in his room. Interviewing patients proves to be harder than usual as most of them are mentally unstable. While the two CSIs are there, they uncover more than just the crime. One of the most shocking discoveries involves a patient with a dark childhood, which is still haunting him, and a nurse with a secret. Absent: Catherine Willows (Marg Helgenberger), Warrick Brown (Gary Dourdan) and Nick Stokes (George Eads)
114	22	"Weeping Willows"	Kenneth Fink	Areanne Lloyd	May 5, 2005	522	26.65
After an exhausting day, Catherine stops by a bar where she is chatted up by another customer (played by Marg Helgenberger's then real-life husband Alan Rosenberg). As she is leaving, he gives her his number on the bar's matchbook and lashes out when she doesn't want to kiss him. Later on that night, Grissom calls her in for a favor, as he is short on staff. A woman has been murdered and prior to her death, she was seen with the same man who was hitting on Catherine in the same bar. A similar matchbook with a phone number inside, found on the victim, further points to this man as the main suspect. (First appearance of Catherine's mother, Lily Flynn (Anita Gillette).)
115	23	"Iced"	Richard J. Lewis	Josh Berman	May 12, 2005	525	26.46
Sara and Greg investigate the death of two students in a dorm room; with no evidence of foul play, they offer up another explanation of their death: dry ice. Also: Nick, Warrick and Catherine investigate a man found dead in a 'crop circle', which in actuality was a helicopter prank for a reality TV show gone wrong. And Ecklie has to find out what happened to the corpse in the case he was working on, when he and Robbins discovered it missing; it was temporarily "borrowed" for a party joke, not unlike Weekend at Bernie's. (First appearance of toxicology specialist Henry Andrews (Jon Wellner, in what would become his permanent role in this series).)
116	24	"Grave Danger"	Quentin Tarantino	Story by : Quentin Tarantino; Teleplay by : Naren Shankar & Anthony E. Zuiker & Carol Mendelsohn	May 19, 2005	523	30.73
117	25	"Grave Danger"	Quentin Tarantino	Story by : Quentin Tarantino; Teleplay by : Naren Shankar & Anthony E. Zuiker & Carol Mendelsohn	May 19, 2005	524	30.73
CSI Nick Stokes is kidnapped while investigating a crime scene and buried alive in a glass casket by his kidnapper. The Las Vegas Police Department receives a package with a tape and a USB key which allows them to watch Nick inside the casket, together with a request for one million dollars in cash to release him. The mayor refuses to pay the ransom, but Catherine convinces her wealthy father to provide the money. Gil Grissom schedules a meeting with the criminal to deliver the money and be informed where Nick is. After Grissom gives the kidnapper the ransom money, the kidnapper blows himself up without revealing where Nick is buried. The team must then use all their knowledge and resources, as well as race against time, to find Nick before he runs out of air. (First appearance of Undersheriff Jeffrey McKeen (Conor O'Farrell).)
