= Dharmachari Aryadaka =

Dharmachari Aryadaka (1948–2003), born as Philip Miller in Seattle, Washington, was best known for being the first Buddhist chaplain in Washington state prisons.

Escaping the draft, Aryadaka traveled the world; he went to India, Nepal, the Himalayas, Morocco, and Afghanistan. He converted to Buddhism in his twenties, during his imprisonment in 1974 for 22 months in Finland on a drug charge, when he joined the Friends of the Western Buddhist Order, now the Triratna Buddhist Community. He discovered Buddhism out of his prison experience, when he "took meditation seriously and found dharma in his cell". He returned to the US 1981, and began teaching meditation in his home, and started a family in 1984.

Aryadaka was ordained as a member of the FWBO in 1984, and was given his name by the order after a three-month retreat in Italy. It means "noble sky-goer" and was given to him because he "embodied lofty and spiritual ideals". While working as a land surveyor, welder, and sculpturist, Aryadaka built up the Western Buddhist Order in Seattle, co-founded the Seattle Buddhist Center on Beacon Hill, and worked with prisoners. He also worked as a volunteer and liaison between prisoners and their families. He was appointed to Washington's Religious Advisory Committee in 1998 and became the state's first paid Buddhist prison chaplain in 2000, illustrating a shift in how prison ministries reached out to less traditional religious traditions.

Aryadaka died in 2003 at the age of 55 from liver disease caused by the hepatitis C virus. He had a liver transplant four years earlier.
