= Kai Hermann =

German journalist (born 1938)

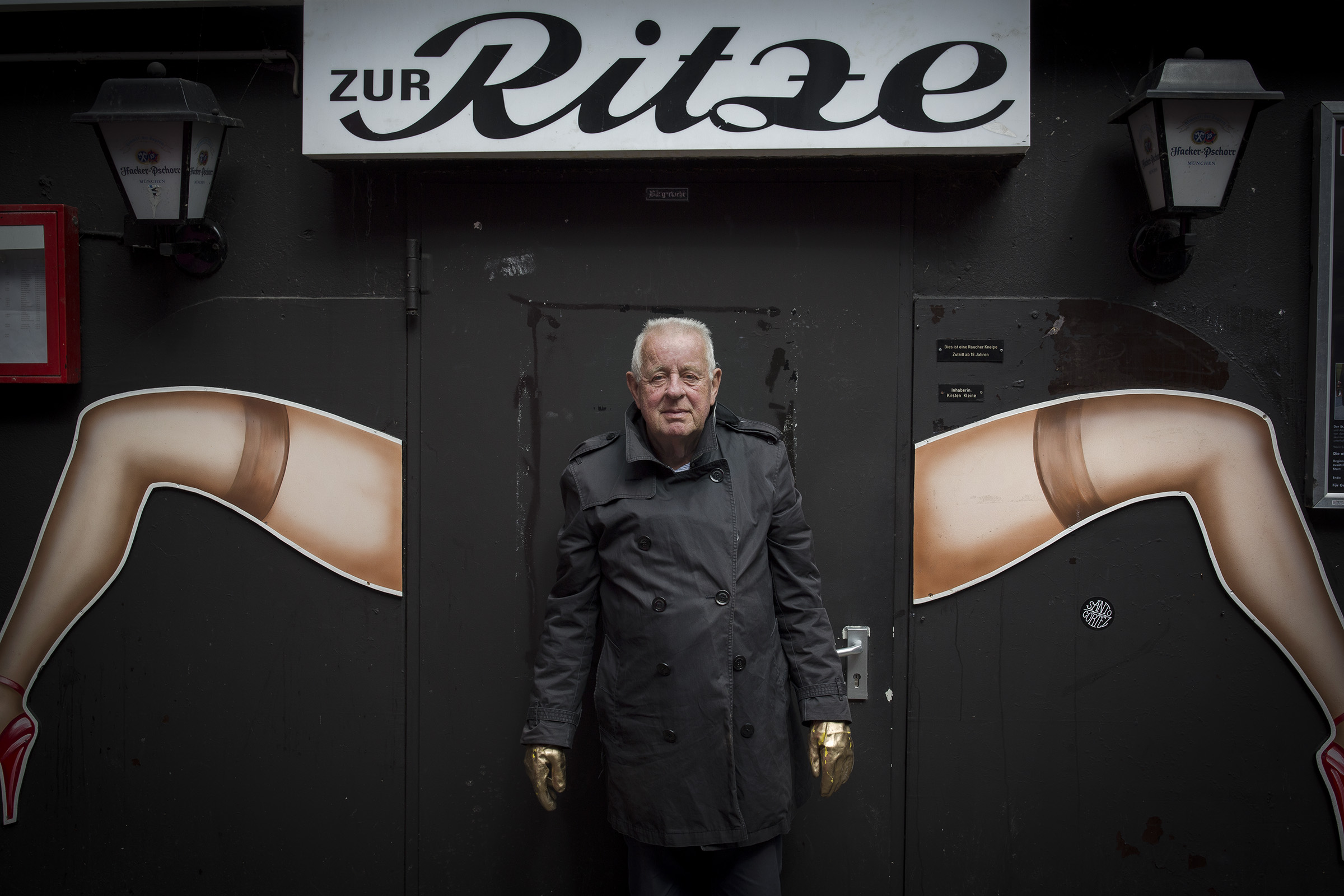
Kai Hermann photographed by Oliver Mark in Hamburg, 2016

Kai Hermann (born 29 January 1938) is a German journalist, who contributed to the magazines Die Zeit, Der Spiegel, Twen, and Stern, and published multiple works including "La révolte des étudiants" and "Intervention décisive à Mogadiscio". He is the co-author of Zoo Station: The Story of Christiane F. with Horst Rieck.

He is a Theodor Wolff Prize laureate, and recipient of the Carl von Ossietzky Medal.

== Filmography ==
- Christiane F. (1981)
- Circle of Deceit (1981)
- The Colony (1987)
- Engel & Joe (2001)
