= Radek John =

Czech journalist and politician (born 1954)

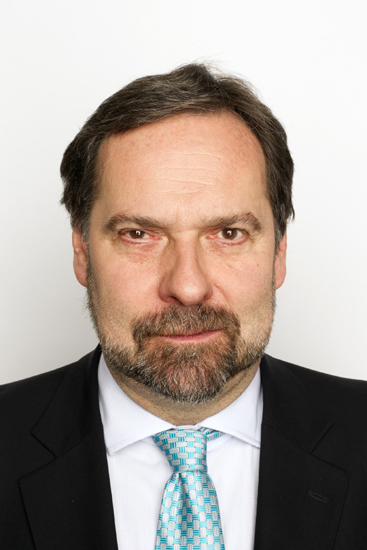

Minister of Interior
- In office 13 July 2010 – 21 April 2011
- Prime Minister: Petr Nečas
- Preceded by: Martin Pecina
- Succeeded by: Jan Kubice

Member of the Chamber of Deputies
- In office 29 May 2010 – 28 August 2013

Personal details
- Born: 6 December 1954 (age 71) Prague, Czechoslovakia (now Czech Republic)
- Party: Public Affairs (2009-2015)
- Spouse: Zlata Adamovská (1984-2010)
- Children: Barbora, Petr, Tereza
- Education: FAMU
- Profession: Screenwriter, writer, politician

Radek John (Czech pronunciation: [ˈradɛk ˈjoːn]; born 6 December 1954) is a Czech journalist, writer, screenwriter and politician who served as the Minister of Interior from 2010 to 2011 and as Leader of the Public Affairs party from 2009 to 2013. His novel Memento is the first book examining the drug problem in the context of the former communist Czechoslovakia. The novel was translated into ten languages.

From 13 July 2010 to 21 April 2011 he served as the Minister of Interior of the Czech Republic.

== Early life ==
To 1979 he studied screenwriting and graduated from the Film and TV School of the Academy of Performing Arts in Prague (FAMU). From 1980 till 1993 he worked as an editor of Mladý Svět magazine. He then worked as a screenwriter at Barrandov Film Studios.
