= CSI: Crime Scene Investigation season 4 =

American TV show season

CSI: Crime Scene Investigation
- Season 4
- Season 4 U.S. DVD cover
- Starring: William Petersen; Marg Helgenberger; Gary Dourdan; George Eads; Jorja Fox; Eric Szmanda; Robert David Hall; Paul Guilfoyle
- No. of episodes: 23

Release
- Original network: CBS
- Original release: September 25, 2003 – May 20, 2004

Season chronology
- ← Previous; Season 3 Next → Season 5

The fourth season of CSI: Crime Scene Investigation premiered on CBS on September 25, 2003, and ended May 20, 2004. The series stars William Petersen and Marg Helgenberger.

== Plot ==
Nick accidentally leaks information to a news reporter ("Assume Nothing"), and Catherine tries to discover how a body ended up in a bathtub ("All for Our Country") during the fourth season of CSI. Supervised by Grissom and Willows, the Las Vegas CSIs are tasked with investigating the bizarre, the unlikely, and the unprecedented, including a disappearing gun ("Homebodies"), the death of a baby during a heatwave ("Feeling the Heat"), a case of raccoon versus big rig ("Fur and Loathing"), a car-bombing ("Grissom Versus the Volcano"), and the derailment of a roller-coaster ("Turn of the Screws"). Meanwhile, Catherine usurps a case from Nick and Sara ("After the Show"), the team have to re-investigate a rape-murder ("Invisible Evidence"), Grissom heads to Jackpot, Nevada ("Jackpot"), and team take part in a CSI relay, bringing together investigative teams from across America ("Dead Ringer").

== Cast ==
=== Main cast ===
- William Petersen as Gil Grissom, a CSI Level 3 Supervisor
- Marg Helgenberger as Catherine Willows, a CSI Level 3 Assistant Supervisor
- Gary Dourdan as Warrick Brown, a CSI Level 3
- George Eads as Nick Stokes, a CSI Level 3
- Jorja Fox as Sara Sidle, a CSI Level 3
- Eric Szmanda as Greg Sanders, a DNA Technician
- Robert David Hall as Al Robbins, the CME (Chief Medical Examiner)
- Paul Guilfoyle as Jim Brass, a Homicide Detective Captain

=== Recurring cast ===
- Wallace Langham as David Hodges
- David Berman as David Phillips
- Archie Kao as Archie Johnson

== Episodes ==
| No. overall | No. in season | Title | Directed by | Written by | Original release date | Prod. code | US viewers (millions) |
|---|---|---|---|---|---|---|---|
| 70 | 1 | "Assume Nothing: Part 1" | Richard J. Lewis | Anthony E. Zuiker & Danny Cannon | September 25, 2003 | 402 | 26.91 |
When a couple is murdered after meeting another couple in a bar, Grissom and his team suspect it is the work of a pair of serial killers. Nick jeopardizes the case when he gives an old friend some information on the case and it later turns up on the local news. This is the first of a two-part episode.
| 71 | 2 | "All for Our Country: Part 2" | Richard J. Lewis | Story by : Richard Catalani; Teleplay by : Andrew Lipsitz & Carol Mendelsohn | October 2, 2003 | 403 | 26.66 |
When the suspects in the serial killer case are murdered, Grissom, Nick and Warrick suspect it's an inside job. Meanwhile, Catherine and Sara investigate the death of a football fan who is found floating in his bathtub.
| 72 | 3 | "Homebodies" | Kenneth Fink | Naren Shankar & Sarah Goldfinger | October 9, 2003 | 401 | 26.54 |
Grissom and Warrick investigate when the mummified remains of an old woman are found in a closet. This case soon turns out to be connected to Sara and Nick's case: breaking and entering that involved the rape of a teenage girl. Meanwhile, Catherine tries to connect a weapon found in a backyard to a murder that took place on the other side of town. (Guest starred Stephen Root.)
| 73 | 4 | "Feeling the Heat" | Kenneth Fink | Anthony E. Zuiker & Eli Talbert | October 23, 2003 | 405 | 27.58 |
During a heat wave, Grissom and Catherine investigate the death of a baby who was found dead locked in a car. Nick and Sara look into the death of a woman who was found floating in a lake with a headwound. Warrick investigates the case of a man who died at his home of an apparent heat stroke.
| 74 | 5 | "Fur and Loathing" | Richard J. Lewis | Jerry Stahl | October 30, 2003 | 406 | 27.35 |
After a woman is killed in a head-on collision with a big rig, Catherine and Grissom discover the dead body of a man dressed in a full-size raccoon costume across the road. They uncover that the man is dressed like that because he recently attended a plushies and furry convention leading them to probe further into this subculture to see who may be responsible for the man’s murder. Meanwhile, Nick and Sara investigate the murder of a convenience store employee found in the store’s industrial freezer shot to death.
| 75 | 6 | "Jackpot" | Danny Cannon | Naren Shankar & Carol Mendelsohn | November 6, 2003 | 407 | 29.65 |
After Dr. Robbins receives a severed head from the Elko County Sheriff's Office, Grissom goes to Jackpot, Nevada in search of the rest of the body. When he arrives he soon finds out that he cannot expect much help from the locals. Even the sheriff seems to be hiding something. Grissom would later have to fashion a new CSI kit out of materials found at a local variety store after his kit was stolen in a smash-and-grab - in the middle of the woods. Meanwhile, Catherine gets an unexpected gift from her father, in a form of a $250,000 check. (The Jackpot scenes were not filmed in that town, but rather in Fawnskin, California, a town in the Big Bear Valley) .Absent: Nick Stokes, Sarah Sidle
| 76 | 7 | "Invisible Evidence" | Danny Cannon | Josh Berman | November 13, 2003 | 404 | 29.27 |
During a preliminary trial for the rape and murder of a 19-year-old woman, the crucial evidence, a bloodied knife, is discarded because it was secured from the defendant's car without a warrant. With only 24 hours left before the court has to let him walk, the team pools their resources together in an attempt to find other evidence that can place the defendant behind bars.
| 77 | 8 | "After the Show" | Kenneth Fink | Andrew Lipsitz & Elizabeth Devine | November 20, 2003 | 408 | 26.64 |
The center of attention for the Las Vegas media is a missing model who aspired to become a showgirl. When a strange 911 call comes in, Catherine is sure she has found the man responsible and takes over the case from Sara and Nick, who both hoped they could use this high profile case to get a promotion. Absent: Warrick Brown
| 78 | 9 | "Grissom Versus the Volcano" | Richard J. Lewis | Story by : Josh Berman; Teleplay by : Anthony E. Zuiker & Carol Mendelsohn | December 11, 2003 | 409 | 26.81 |
When the new sheriff is witness to a car bombing that kills an air marshal, he puts pressure on Grissom to find the murderer. Remains of the bomb lead Grissom, Catherine and Nick to a high school science fair. Meanwhile, Warrick and Sara look into the death of the wife of a popular singer. (First appearance of detective Lou Vartann (Alex Carter).)
| 79 | 10 | "Coming of Rage" | Nelson McCormick | Story by : Richard Catalani; Teleplay by : Sarah Goldfinger | December 18, 2003 | 410 | 24.70 |
Grissom, Sara and Warrick investigate when a 15-year-old boy is found beaten to death with a hammer at a construction site. Meanwhile, Nick and Catherine try to find out how a woman was killed by a gunshot in her front yard while her husband and ex-husband were arguing over her. The boy's murder is based on the 2003 murder of Jason Sweeney.
| 80 | 11 | "Eleven Angry Jurors" | Matt Earl Beesley | Josh Berman & Andrew Lipsitz | January 8, 2004 | 411 | 27.48 |
When the only juror to vote 'not guilty' in a trial is found dead in the jury room, Grissom's team looks for the suspect among the other eleven jurors. Meanwhile, Nick reopens a four-year case when the sister of a missing person comes with new evidence.
| 81 | 12 | "Butterflied" | Richard J. Lewis | David Rambo | January 15, 2004 | 412 | 28.74 |
A nurse is found dead in her house by her friend, who's also a nurse. The victim died in her spacious bathroom, posed with her head facing the door. Grissom is left unnerved because the victim bears a resemblance to his fellow CSI, Sara Sidle. According to the friend, she was to have dinner with her new boyfriend, Dr. Michael Clark, who works at the same hospital. Processing the crime scene reveals very little evidence because the killer has thoroughly cleaned the place and used bleach to denature any DNA. Dr. Clark, initially a prime suspect, is later found, albeit in pieces, in garbage bins behind the house. The precision of various cuts suggests that the medical personnel is the killer. Meanwhile, this case prompts Grissom to contemplate his workaholic life and whether it is worth the life he may be missing out on. Absent: Nick Stokes
| 82 | 13 | "Suckers" | Danny Cannon | Danny Cannon & Josh Berman | February 5, 2004 | 414 | 29.27 |
Grissom, Sara and Nick deal with a bizarre case when a priceless 17th century Japanese samurai sword is stolen from an exhibit at a casino, only to find out the sword is not as valuable, and the burglary may have been an exercise in fraud. Meanwhile, Catherine and Warrick have to look into the world of 'vampires' when a young woman is found dead with all her blood drained from her body.
| 83 | 14 | "Paper or Plastic?" | Kenneth Fink | Naren Shankar | February 12, 2004 | 413 | 30.94 |
The entire team investigates when a robbery at a grocery store turns into a shootout, leaving five people dead, one of whom is a police officer. The evidence leads Grissom to doubt the story of the other police officer at the scene. Absent: Greg Sanders.
| 84 | 15 | "Early Rollout" | Duane Clark | Story by : Elizabeth Devine; Teleplay by : Anthony E. Zuiker & Carol Mendelsohn | February 19, 2004 | 415 | 30.87 |
The whole team investigates the execution-style murder of a husband and his porn star wife in a gated community. Catherine gets involved with one of the suspects, even after Grissom questioned her ethics when she told him she accepted Sam Braun's check. (Also guest starred former Mayor of Las Vegas Oscar Goodman as himself, representing one of the suspects as their lawyer.)
| 85 | 16 | "Getting Off" | Kenneth Fink | Jerry Stahl | February 26, 2004 | 416 | 28.01 |
Grissom, Warrick and Nick investigate when a halfway house worker is found stabbed to death in a bad neighborhood. Meanwhile, Catherine and Sara investigate the death of a clown who was murdered and dumped in an area frequented by transvestites. (Guest starred Paul Dooley.)
| 86 | 17 | "XX" | Deran Sarafian | Ethlie Ann Vare | March 11, 2004 | 417 | 27.40 |
Catherine, Sara and Nick investigate when the body of a female prison inmate is found tied to the underside of a bus. What first looks like an escape gone wrong turns out to be a murder when it is discovered the woman was already dead before she was tied to the bus. Meanwhile, Grissom and Warrick investigate the death of a man stabbed to death in his apartment.
| 87 | 18 | "Bad to the Bone" | David Grossman | Eli Talbert | April 1, 2004 | 418 | 26.47 |
The CSI's investigate when a single man beats another man to death in a casino parking garage. They quickly discover that their extremely short-tempered suspect may be responsible for another murder. (Guest starred Megan Follows.)
| 88 | 19 | "Bad Words" | Rob Bailey | Sarah Goldfinger | April 15, 2004 | 419 | 23.79 |
When a teenage girl is killed in a house fire, Catherine, Nick and Warrick suspect a serial arsonist. Among their suspects are the girl's demented grandmother, a female pyromaniac and the high school baseball team. Meanwhile, Grissom and Sara investigate the death of a champion in a popular word game, who is found dead in the men's room with several game tiles in his throat and stomach.
| 89 | 20 | "Dead Ringer" | Kenneth Fink | Elizabeth Devine | April 29, 2004 | 420 | 26.37 |
The CSIs have to drop out of the annual 120-mile 24-hour law enforcement relay race from Baker to Vegas when Grissom finds a dead contestant, working for the Los Angeles County Sheriff's Department, off the side of the course. With Catherine calling the event "Spring Break with a badge" due to over 20,000 people participating or spectating in the event, Grissom has the number of suspects cut out for him. Meanwhile, Warrick and Sara investigate what appears to be a murder-suicide when a male and a female cop are found dead in a hotel room.
| 90 | 21 | "Turn of the Screws" | Deran Sarafian | Story by : Carol Mendelsohn & Richard Catalani; Teleplay by : Josh Berman | May 6, 2004 | 421 | 20.39 |
Grissom, Sara and Nick investigate when a roller coaster derails at an amusement park, leaving six people dead. When it turns out there were only five people on the roller coaster, they suspect foul play. Catherine and Warrick investigate the murder of a 13-year-old girl.
| 91 | 22 | "No More Bets" | Richard J. Lewis | Teleplay by : Naren Shankar & Carol Mendelsohn & Judith McCreary; Story by : Andrew Lipsitz & Dustin Lee Abraham | May 13, 2004 | 422 | 22.53 |
The CSIs investigate when two young gamblers are found dead shortly after scamming several of Sam Braun's casinos. Grissom is forced to take Catherine off the case, because her father is a suspect in their murder.
| 92 | 23 | "Bloodlines" | Kenneth Fink | Story by : Eli Talbert & Sarah Goldfinger; Teleplay by : Carol Mendelsohn & Naren Shankar | May 20, 2004 | 423 | 25.40 |
The CSIs investigate when a casino employee is beaten and raped on her way home from work. The victim identifies her attacker; however, the DNA evidence suggests that he is not the person responsible, but rather someone related to him. The case would become more serious after she was found dead in a vacant lot. Later, Sara, stressed out over the case, would later be caught driving over the blood alcohol limit, leading to Grissom to come to her defense.
