= Herman Weigel =

German film producer and screenwriter (born 1950)

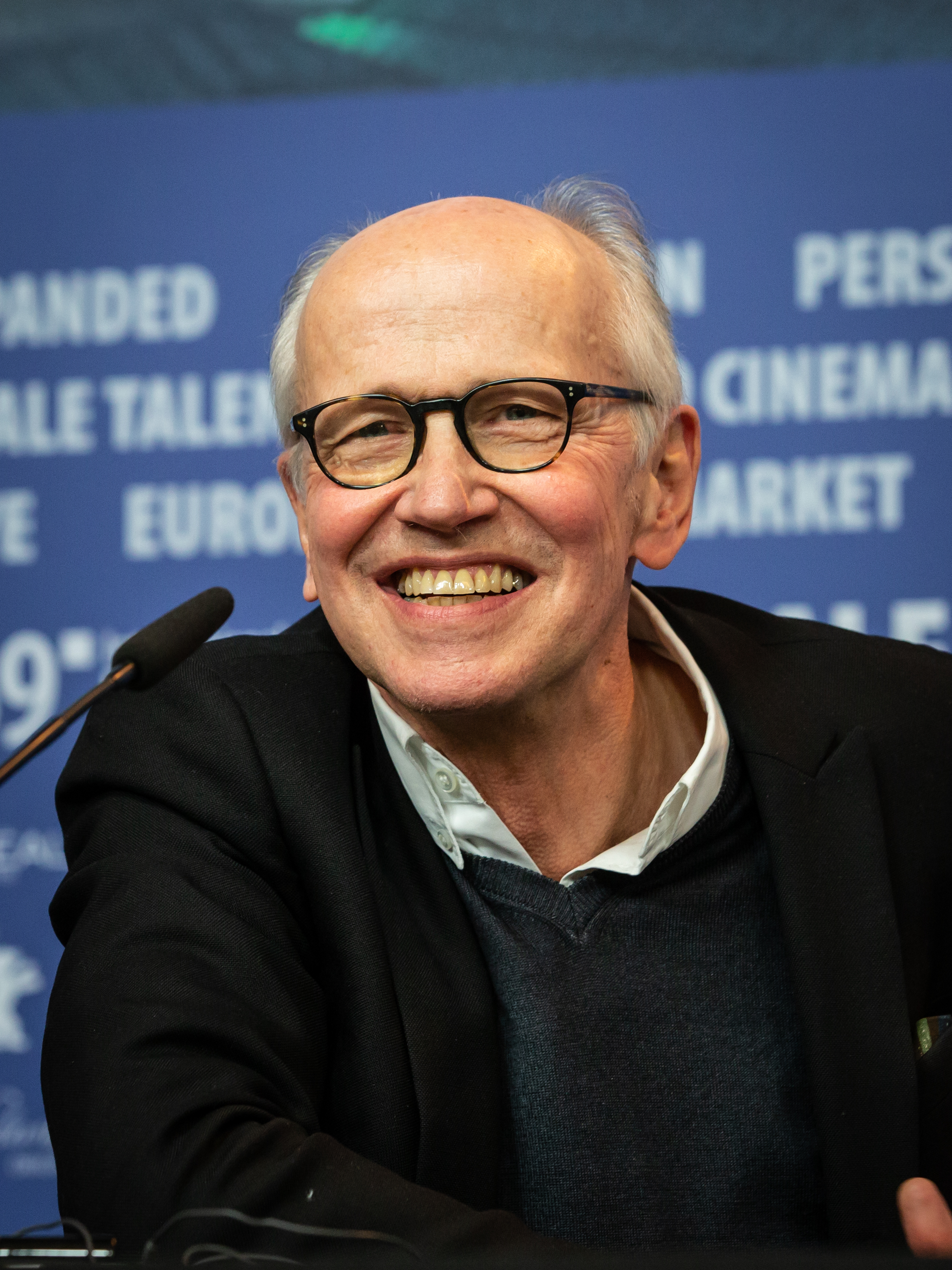
- Film producer Herman Weigel at the Berlinale 2019
- Born: 22 March 1950 (age 76); Moers, West Germany
- Occupations: Film producer, screenwriter

Herman Weigel (born 22 March 1950 in Moers) is a German film producer and screenwriter. He is one of the writers and producer of the television series Hausmeister Krause. Weigel is a graduate of the Munich Academy for Television and Film.
