= Uli Edel =

German film and television director

- Born: Ulrich Edel; 11 April 1947 (age 79); Neuenburg am Rhein, Germany
- Spouse: Gloria Edel
- Awards: 1989 Bavarian Film Awards Best Director NYFCC and Boston Society of Film Critics Awards; 1990 Last Exit to Brooklyn, 1997 Golden Globes Best Mini Series of Motion Picture Made for TV

Ulrich "Uli" Edel (German: [ˈʊli ˈeːdl̩]; born 11 April 1947) is a German film and television director, best known for his work on films such as Christiane F., Last Exit to Brooklyn, Body of Evidence and The Baader Meinhof Complex. He also directed Episode 14, Season 2 "Double Play" of the 1990s show Twin Peaks.

His Rasputin: Dark Servant of Destiny won a Golden Globe for Best Mini-Series or Motion Picture made for TV. Alan Rickman in the title role won an Emmy and a Golden Globe for Best Actor. Ian McKellen, playing Tsar Nicholas II, won a Golden Globe for Best Supporting Actor.

== Awards ==
Edel was awarded Best Director at the Bavarian and German Film Awards in 1990 for Last Exit to Brooklyn. In 2009, he received another nomination in this category for his work on The Baader Meinhof Complex.
