= Darts discography =

- Studio albums: 4
- Live albums: 2
- Compilation albums: 9
- Singles: 21
- Box sets: 2

This is the discography of British doo-wop revival band Darts.

== Albums ==
=== Studio albums ===
Title	Album details	Peak chart positions					Certifications
Title	Album details	UK	FIN	NL	NOR	SWE	Certifications
Darts	Released: November 1977; Label: Magnet; Formats: LP, MC	9	2	17	18	4	UK: Gold
Everyone Plays Darts	Released: May 1978; Label: Magnet; Formats: LP, MC	12	6	42	15	15	UK: Gold
Dart Attack	Released: September 1979; Label: Magnet; Formats: LP, MC	38	—	—	—	—	UK: Silver
Across America	Released: June 1981; Label: Kat Family; Formats: LP, MC; US-only release	—	—	—	—	—	
"—" denotes releases that did not chart or were not released in that territory.							

=== Live albums ===
Title	Album details
In Concert	Released: 1999; Label: Brilliant; Formats: CD

Title	Album details
Live At The Blue Lagoon Festival	Released: 2024; Label: Go Faster Stripe; Formats: Double LP / Download

=== Compilation albums ===
Title	Album details	Peak chart positions		Certifications
Title	Album details	UK	FIN	Certifications
The Amazing Darts	Released: October 1978; Label: Magnet/K-tel; Formats: LP, MC	8	29	UK: Gold
Darts	Released: February 1980; Label: Polydor; Formats: LP, MC; US-only release	—	—	
Greatest Hits	Released: 17 October 1980; Label: Magnet; Formats: LP, MC	—	—	
Double Top	Released: September 1981; Label: Pickwick; Formats: LP, MC	—	—	
Daddy Cool – 16 Classic Tracks	Released: January 1993; Label: Magnet; Formats: CD, MC	—	—	
The Platinum Collection	Released: 5 December 2005; Label: Warner; Formats: CD	—	—	
Double Top – The Very Best of Darts	Released: 2 October 2006; Label: Rhino; Formats: 2xCD, digital download	—	—	
Get It! – The Very Best of Darts	Released: 29 August 2011; Label: Music Club/Rhino; Formats: 2xCD	—	—	
Magnet Records Singles Collection	Released: 17 June 2013; Label: Cherry Red/Rhino; Formats: 2xCD	—	—	
"—" denotes releases that did not chart or were not released in that territory.				

=== Box sets ===
Title	Album details
The Complete Collection	Released: 6 November 2015; Label: Edsel; Formats: 6xCD box set
The Albums 1977–81	Released: 21 June 2019; Label: 7T's; Formats: 4xCD

== Singles ==
Title	Year	Peak chart positions								Certifications	Album
Title	Year	UK	AUS	BEL (WA)	FIN	GER	IRE	NOR	SWE	Certifications	Album
"Daddy Cool" / "The Girl Can't Help It"	1977	6	—	9	1	—	10	—	3	UK: Silver	Darts
"Come Back My Love"	1978	2	—	6	17	—	7	—	—	UK: Gold	Darts
"The Boy from New York City"	1978	2	34	12	12	48	9	10	—	UK: Silver	Everyone Plays Darts
"It's Raining"	1978	2	—	8	—	—	2	—	—	UK: Gold	Everyone Plays Darts
"Don't Let It Fade Away"	1978	18	—	—	24	—	13	—	—		
"Get It"	1979	10	—	—	—	—	9	—	—		
"Duke of Earl"	1979	6	—	—	—	—	10	—	—	UK: Silver	Darts Attack
"Can't Get Enough of Your Love"	1979	43	—	—	—	—	—	—	—		Darts Attack
"Reet Petite"	1979	51	—	—	—	—	—	—	—		Darts Attack
"Let's Hang On"	1980	11	—	—	—	—	8	—	—		Across America
"Peaches"	1980	66	—	—	—	—	—	—	—		Across America
"White Christmas" / "Sh-Boom"	1980	48	—	—	—	—	30	—	—		
"Sad and Lonely" (US-only release)	1981	—	—	—	—	—	—	—	—		Across America
"Jump, Children, Jump"	1981	—	—	—	—	—	—	—	—		
"Show Us Your Shoe" (Japan-only release)	1981	—	—	—	—	—	—	—	—		
"The Mystery of Ragoula"	1983	—	—	—	—	—	—	—	—		
"Lorraine"	1983	—	—	—	—	—	—	—	—		
Yakety Yak (EP)	1983	—	—	—	—	—	—	—	—		
"Can't Teach a Fool"	1983	—	—	—	—	—	—	—	—		
"Groovin'"	1984	—	—	—	—	—	—	—	—		
"Blown Away"	1985	—	—	—	—	—	—	—	—		
"—" denotes releases that did not chart or were not released in that territory.
