= Den Hegarty =

Irish singer (born 1954)

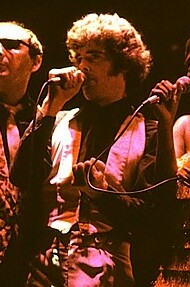
- Hegarty singing with Darts in London, 1978

Background information
- Born: Denis Hegarty; September 13, 1954 (age 72); Dublin, Ireland
- Genres: Rock and roll; doo-wop
- Occupations: Singer; TV and radio presenter; tecturer
- Instrument: Saxophone
- Years active: 1976–present
- Member of: Darts

Denis Hegarty (born 13 September 1954) is an Irish rock and roll, doo-wop and a cappella singer, television presenter, and psychology lecturer. He is best known for his role as bass vocalist in the 1970s doo wop group Darts, and for working as a presenter on Tiswas.

== Early life ==
Hegarty was born in Dublin, Ireland. At an early age Hegarty moved to Brighton, England. Hegarty met two of the singers he would later work with in Darts as a teenager: he met Lydia Sowa (aka Rita Ray) when he was 13, and a year later met Ian Collier (aka Griff Fender).

Hegarty went to University and studied English, but dropped out in his final year when he started suffering from major epileptic seizures.

== Career ==
=== Early career ===
In 1972, Hegarty was a member for four years of the rock and roll group Rocky Sharpe & the Razors. The group dissolved in 1976 when lead singer Rocky Sharpe would lose his voice after every gig. A year later, Sharpe reformed the group as Rocky Sharpe and the Replays.

=== Darts ===
Hegarty formed the 1950s styled band, Darts in August 1976, along with vocalists Rita Ray, Griff Fender and sax player Horatio Hornblower, all of whom he had played with in Rocky Sharpe & the Razors. His role in Darts was as the bass singer, songwriter, arranger and music director.

In 1978, the band had three singles that all peaked at number two: "Come Back My Love" (originally recorded by The Wrens in 1955), "The Boy from New York City" (originally by The Ad Libs in 1964) and "It's Raining" (an original composition by member Griff Fender).

Described as "wild eyed", "wild haired and manic", "maniacal", and as a "kinetic and charismatic performer", Hegarty gave the group a distinctive, anarchic edge. As the former BBC radio executive Lesley Douglas later recalled of a 1970s gig: "I remember sitting in the front row terrified of the Darts singer Den Hegarty, because all the papers had said that he was the mad man of music and that he would dive into the crowd". Music journalist Will Hodgkinson recounted another incident, during a Spanish eurovision TV show in 1979, where "the grandiosity of the whole affair proved too much for the bug-eyed Hegarty, who felt compelled to jump into a fountain and roll around in it, mid-performance", before taking off his socks and wringing them down the neck of actress Sylvia Kristel. Dave Haslam recalled how Hegarty "had a thing for clambering on the speaker stacks at the side of the stage (by far the highlight of the set)".

By late 1978, Darts' touring schedule was so full that Hegarty was completely unaware at the time that his father had nearly died until after he had left hospital. Hegarty then asked the bands manager if they could cut down on touring so he could tend to his father, but according to Hegarty, their manager, who he described as "a total shyster, because he ripped the rest of them off absolutely mercilessly" made it out that Den was "betraying everybody", so he ultimately left Darts in September 1978.

=== Solo ===
He signed to Mercury Records and released a solo single "Voodoo Voodoo" in March 1979 which was his only solo hit, reaching number 73 in the UK Singles Chart. The following year, he made a guest appearance on The Clash's album Sandinista!. Hegarty believes that he was "restricted in the kind of things" he wanted to do in his solo career as he was signed to the same label as Darts, and they didn't want him to "do something that would compete with Darts".

=== Television ===
Hegarty moved into broadcasting, hosting the Tyne Tees Television show Alright Now. After working for BBC Radio 1 (presenting Talkabout), and featuring in three series of Jack Good's final television show, Let's Rock, he moved on to host the final series of Tiswas along with DJ Gordon Astley, comedian/impressionist Fogwell Flax, and Sally James. Hegarty's contributions included "inexplicably sitting in a bathtub full of baked beans or providing loud 'BONG's in his booming bass tones for a section aping the 10 o'clock news called News At Den". After the demise of Tiswas, Hegarty became a cable show quizmaster, and then took another direction providing voices for animated characters in television advertisements.

=== Psychology ===
Hegarty, who had dropped out of university in the 1970s due to his epilepsy, decided to go back to university in the 1990s to study psychology, partly because he wanted to "understand more about what was going on in my brain". After graduating, Hegarty worked as a lecturer in psychology at Exeter College and with the Open University, but was retired as of 2023.

=== Recent music career ===
Hegarty is still singing. He has fronted an a cappella band called Slackapella, plus a 15-piece outfit called Soul Traders (a group he formed at Butterleigh village hall in 1999), and sang with the doo-woppers, The Metrotones until 2022. Hegarty helped revive Darts in 2006 and still performs at occasional gigs with the reformed band, which still mostly includes original members.. He has also been a member of The Senti-Mentals since 2009 and features on their albums "Who Knows, Who Cares" (2009) and "The Senti-Mentals III" (2021) and other recordings. He appears live with them in their occasional shows.

== Personal life ==
Hegarty lives with his wife and one son in Devon.

== Solo discography ==
=== Singles ===
Year	Label	A-side	B-side	UK	Notes
1979	Magnet Records	"Voodoo Voodoo"	"Love Was A Secret"	73	
1980	Magnet Records	"Working In The Coalmine"	"Down In The Sewer"		Released as "Big Den And The Random Band"
1982	Bronze Records	"The Big Country"	"Papa-Oom-Mow-Mow"		Released as "Big Den And The Random Band"
