= Bob Fish (singer) =

IBritish singer (born 1949)

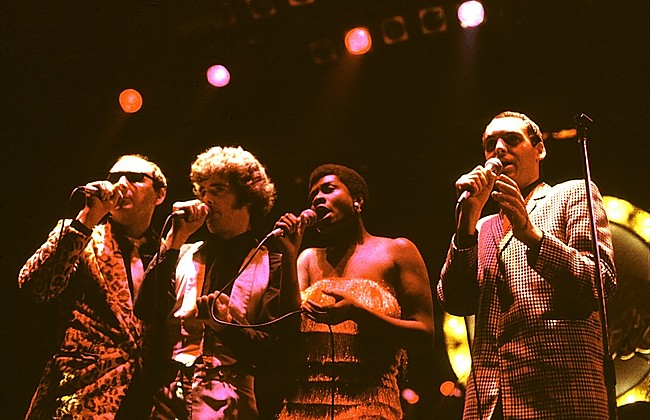
- Darts in 1978, Fish stands at the far left

Background information
- Born: Robert Fish; 3 June 1949; Essex, England
- Died: 22 August 2021 (aged 72)
- Genres: Rock and roll; Doo-wop
- Occupation: Singer

Robert 'Bob' Fish (3 June 1949 – 22 August 2021) was a British rock and roll and doo-wop singer. He was a member of the band Darts.

== Early life ==
Robert Fish was born in Essex. He attended art college, where he first listened to American doo-wop records of the 1950s. In his early career, he sang in several bands while working as a graphic designer.

== Career ==
Fish's musical career started out working in Mickey Jupp’s band. He then joined Darts in 1976. He was known for his distinctive falsetto singing voice. The band are best remembered for their 1978 singles "Come Back My Love", "The Boy from New York City" and "It's Raining", the first and last of which featured Fish on lead vocals, all of which peaked at number two on the UK singles charts.

After he left Darts in 1980, Fish became briefly the manager of the British pop band Roman Holliday for three years. He then appeared in stage productions. He also became a renowned player of the auto-harp, a stringed instrument and formed the duo White Doves with Ian Cal Ford.

== Personal life ==
Fish married his wife, Heather, a Welsh nurse from Tenby, in 1980. They moved to Abercastle in Wales a year later had two daughters, Scarlett and China. He also worked as a graphic designer in Spain for two years. He also formed his own Darts group called "Darts II", and toured for a few years, but when he began suffering from hearing problems, disbanded the group and moved back to Wales.

Fish died in August 2021 after suffering from cancer at his home in Narbeth, Pembrokeshire, Wales. He was survived by his wife Heather and their two children.

A celebration of Fish's life took place in Cresswell Quay.
