= It's Raining =

It's Raining may refer to:

- It's Raining (album), a 2004 album by Rain
- It's Raining (Rain song), 2004
- It's Raining (Irma Thomas song), 1962
- It's Raining (Darts song), 1978
- "It's Raining", a 2010 song by Sylvia Ratonel from Sylvia Ratonel
- "It's Raining", a tango by Ilya Shatrov

== See also ==
- Raining Men (disambiguation)
