= James Compton (disambiguation) =

James Compton (born 1939) is president and CEO of the Chicago Urban League.

James Compton may also refer to:

- James Compton, 3rd Earl of Northampton (1622–1681), English peer, soldier, and politician
- James Compton, 5th Earl of Northampton (1687–1754), British peer and politician
- James Compton (musician) (born 1959), British musician and actor
