= It's Raining (Darts song) =

Single by Darts

from the album Everyone Plays Darts
- A-side: "It's Raining"
- B-side: "Messing Shoe Blues"
- Released: 1978
- Genre: doo-wop
- Length: 3:45
- Songwriter: Ian Collier
- Producers: Tommy Boyce, Richard Hartley

Darts singles chronology
"The Boy from New York City" (1978)	"It's Raining" (1978)	"Don't Let It Fade Away" (1978)

"It's Raining" is a song recorded by Darts and released as a single in 1978. It was originally released as a track on their second studio album Everyone Plays Darts. The song peaked at number two on the UK singles chart in 1978, the band's third and final consecutive number-two charting song.

"It's Raining" was the band's fourth single, and their first not to be a cover. Released by Magnet Records, the song was written by Griff Fender, one of Darts' four vocalists, credited under his real name Ian Collier. The singles B-side, "Messing Shoe Blues", was written by the bands saxophonist, Nigel "Horace" Trubridge. Both sides were produced by Tommy Boyce, of Boyce and Hart, and Richard Hartley, with engineering by Phil Chapman.

== Reception ==
The song charted in three countries: the United Kingdom, Ireland, and Belgium. In Belgium, the song peaked at number eight; however, for both the UK and Ireland, "It's Raining" was the runner up for number one. It ranked number 23 on the 1978 UK year-end chart.

In August 1978, "It's Raining" was certified Gold in the UK.

For Darts, this was their third (and last) consecutive single to peak at number two on the UK charts, with the previous singles being "Come Back My Love" and "The Boy from New York City", both also released in 1978;

== Charts ==
Weekly charts

Chart (1978)	Peak position
Belgium (Ultratop 50 Wallonia)	8
Ireland Singles Chart	2
UK Singles (OCC)	2

Year-end charts

Chart (1978)	Peak position
UK Singles	23
