= Public pianos at St Pancras railway station =

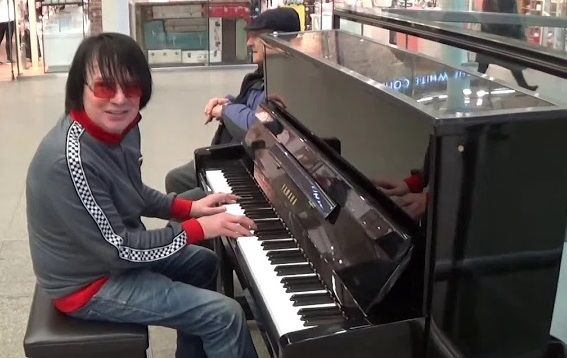
Terry Miles playing the Elton John piano in 2019

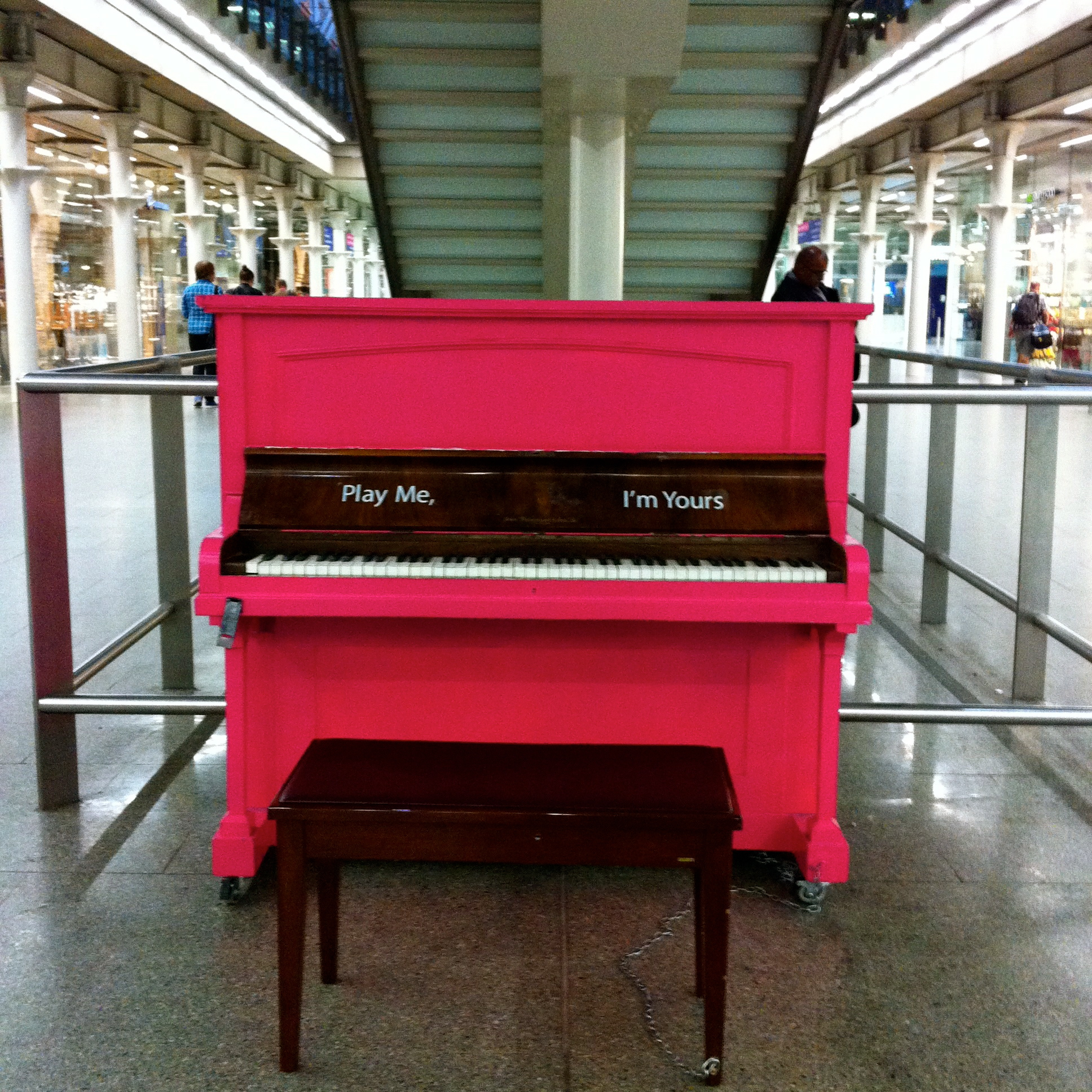
A public piano in St Pancras in 2012

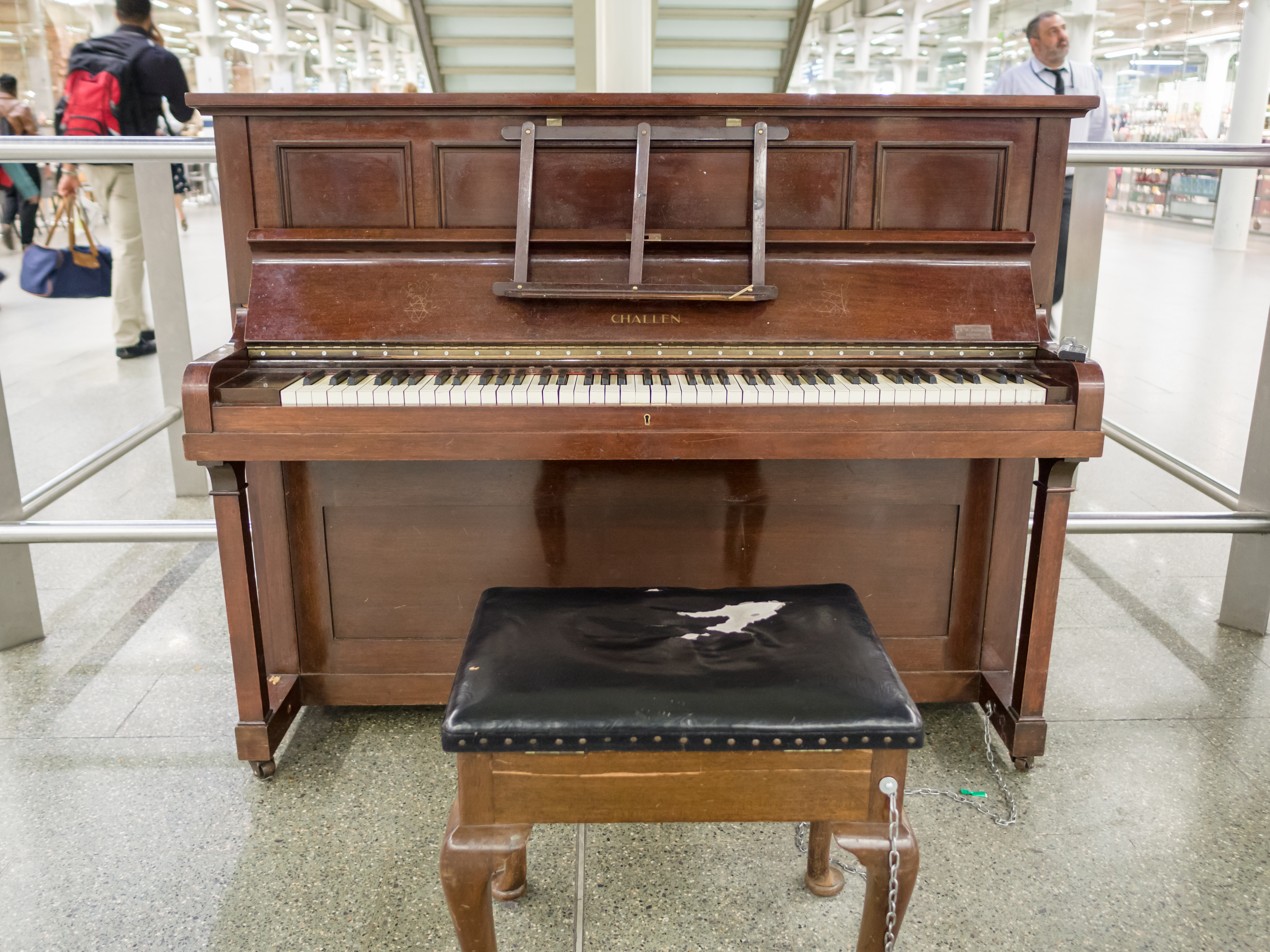
Challen piano in St Pancras in 2017

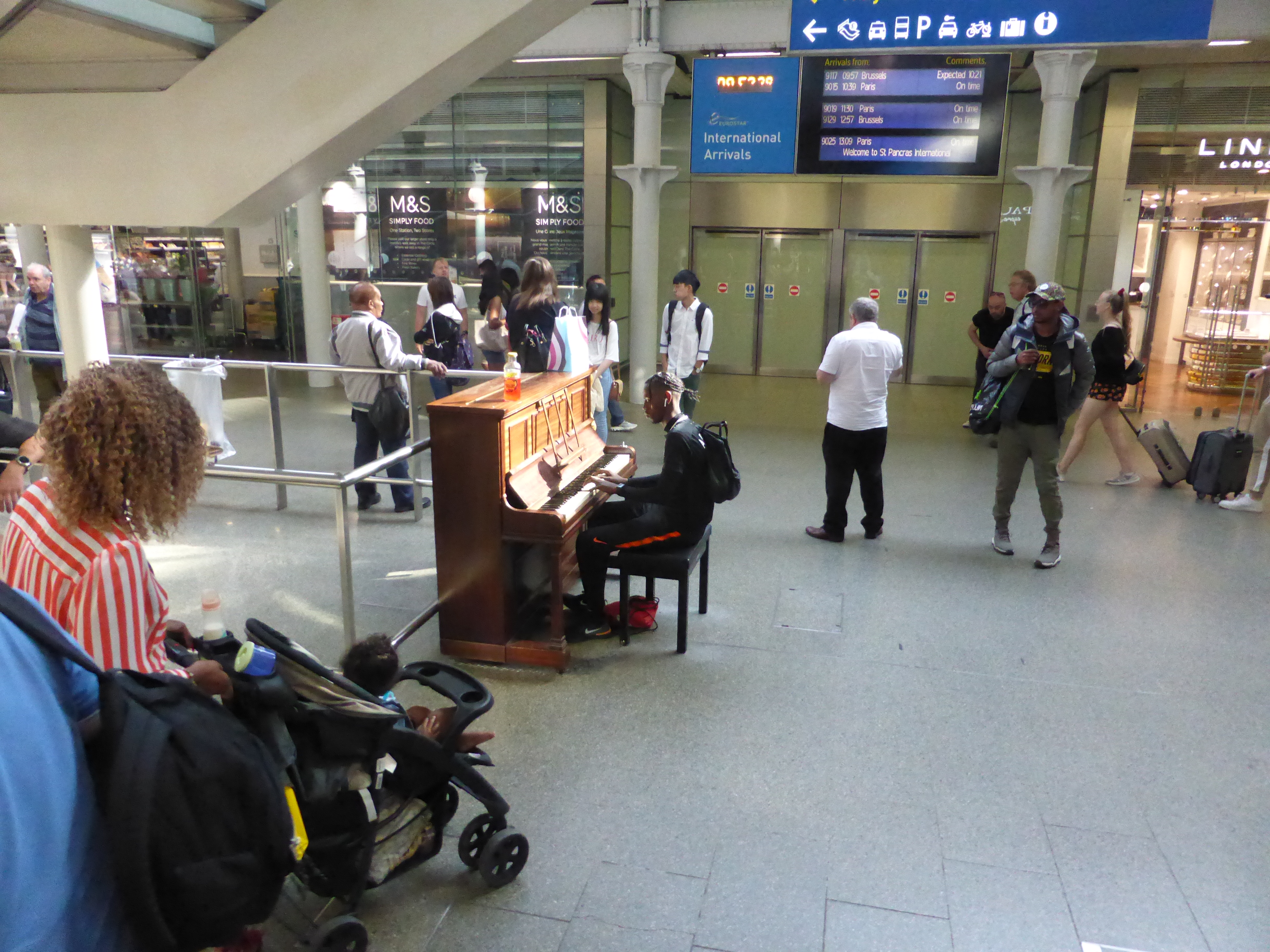
A public piano in St Pancras in 2019

The public pianos at St Pancras railway station are publicly accessible upright pianos located at St Pancras railway station, a major railway interchange in London. They have included a Yamaha piano donated by Elton John and a Yamaha piano donated by Andrew Lloyd Webber, known as the "Phantom Piano".

== History ==
Luke Jerram’s project "Play Me, I’m Yours" began in 2008. In 2012, public pianos were also installed in London; quite a few of them remained in place even after the project had technically moved on. Among the locations where public pianos stayed available were Canary Wharf, Herne Hill, and St Pancras station.

Since then, public pianos at St Pancras have been accessible to members of the public and have been used by both amateur and professional musicians. Their presence has attracted a variety of performers, including Valentina Lisitsa, Alicia Keys, Jools Holland, John Legend, Tom Odell, Jeff Goldblum, Camden Stewart, and Rod Stewart, often generating public and media interest.

On 4 February 2016, Elton John performed a medley at the station to promote his album Wonderful Crazy Night. Following his performance, he donated a Yamaha piano to the station, marking it with the inscription, "Enjoy this piano. It's a gift. Love, Elton John." The Elton John piano was removed from the station concourse at the end of 2024. On November 21, 2026, it returned for one day so that the public could bid farewell to the instrument. The Elton John piano was then auctioned off, with the proceeds intended to benefit the Elton John AIDS Foundation.

In the summer of 2025, the Elton John piano was replaced by a Kawai K-500.

A further Yamaha piano, known as the "Phantom Piano", was donated to St Pancras by Andrew Lloyd Webber Musicals. The piano was decorated with imagery associated with The Phantom of the Opera and added to the station's collection of public pianos.

== 2024 public dispute ==
On 19 January 2024, the Elton John piano was the scene of a widely publicised confrontation involving UK YouTuber Brendan Kavanagh, known as Dr. K for his public piano performances. While Kavanagh was livestreaming at the piano, he was approached by a group of Chinese people, some carrying Chinese flags, who said they were filming for Chinese television. Members of the group objected to appearing in Kavanagh's livestream and told him that he could not publish their images or voices online, citing their image rights and an agreement connected with their television work.

Kavanagh rejected the demand, arguing that he was entitled to film in a public place. The confrontation escalated after he remarked that Britain was a free country and "not Communist China", prompting an accusation of racism. A further dispute arose when Kavanagh reached toward a Chinese flag held by one of the women and a man in the group accused him of touching her. British Transport Police officers subsequently intervened; one officer told the group that filming was permitted in a public place, while another asked Kavanagh to stop filming and relayed the group's request that the footage not be published. The video of the confrontation subsequently went viral.

On 23 January the piano was temporarily sealed off due to ongoing station maintenance works, preventing the public from playing it. On 24 January, St Pancras Station management announced that the piano had been relocated a short distance from the cordoned-off area and that the public piano-playing area had been reinstated.
