= Matt O'Toole =

American actor

- Occupations: Film, television actor

Matt O'Toole is an actor who is best known for his role as Paul Millander in the television series CSI: Crime Scene Investigation.

== Filmography ==
=== Film ===
Year	Title	Role	Notes
1989	Blood Red	Shipping Clerk	
1990	Marked for Death	Yuppie Dealer	
1992	Rage and Honor	Rascoe	
1994	Wyatt Earp	Gyp Clements	
1995	White Man's Burden	Bar Patron #2	
1996	Last Man Standing	Burke	
1997	This World, Then the Fireworks	Thug #2	
1997	Touch	Bailiff	
1998	Montana	Montoya	
1998	Zero Effect	Kragan Vincent	
1998	Break Up	Liquor Store Owner	
2002	Life Without Dick	Patrick #2	
2003	Lost Junction	State Trooper Stan	
2003	Rapid Exchange	Brooks	
2005	The Nickel Children	Ticketer	
2007	Last of the Romantics	Priest	
2008	Dark Streets	Harry	
2009	Ingenious	Larry Kelly	
2009	Up in the Air	Alex's Husband	Voice
2009	Truth Never Lies	John	
2011	Atlas Shrugged: Part I	Brenden Brady	
2012	Tim and Eric's Billion Dollar Movie	Reggie	
2012	Safe	Detective Lasky	

=== Television ===
Year	Title	Role	Notes
1988	Something is Out There	Lester	Episode: "Night of the Visitors"
1992	L.A. Law	Rex	Episode: "Say Goodnight, Gracie"
1993	Room for Two	Guest Star	Episode: "Sex, Rugs and Rock 'n' Roll"
1998	The Magnificent Seven	Beall	Episode: "Safecracker"
1998	Chicago Hope	Daniel Pruitt	Episode: "Objects are Closer Than They Appear"
1999	Nash Bridges	Lothar Gendell	Guest Star, Episode: "Superstition"
1999	Crusade	First Man	Episode: "The Path of Sorrows"
2000-2002	CSI	Paul Millander	Episode: "Pilot"; Episode: "Anonymous"; Episode: "Identity Crisis"
2002	Even Stevens	Mason	Episode: "Close Encounters of the Beans Kind"
2005	The Inside	Pony Man	3 episodes
2010	Cold Case	Eddie Armstrong	Episode: "Metamorphosis"
2020	Thumb Runner	Darren Porn Camel Pus	8 episodes
TBA	The Chronicles of Paine	Bastiaan	Episode: "Pilot" (currently in pre-production)
