= Christine Lee (lawyer) =

Chinese-British lawyer

- Born: Christine Ching Kui Lee; 1963 (age 62–63); Hong Kong
- Other names: Chinese: 李貞駒; pinyin: Lǐ Zhēnjū
- Occupation: Lawyer
- Known for: Accusation of political interference
- Spouse: Martin Wilkes (m. 1990)
- Children: 2

Christine Lee (born Ching Kui Lee; 1963) is a Chinese lawyer, activist, and alleged spy on behalf of the United Front Work Department of the Chinese Communist Party. She has been accused of engaging in covert "political interference activities in the UK".

== Early life ==
Lee was born in Hong Kong. She moved from her birthplace to Northern Ireland in 1974, when she was 11 years old, attending school in Belfast. Lee was bullied for being the only Chinese person in her class. She used this experience as an influence to later encourage and assist British-Chinese people to get involved in politics, beginning with supporting Steven Dominique Cheung during the 2009 European parliamentary elections, who was 19 years old at the time of his campaign.

Beginning when she was 13 years old, Lee helped with her parents' catering business, participating on weekends and at nighttime. After finishing her A-levels, Lee would relocate to Birmingham to complete her legal studies.

== Career ==
Lee began her career with the law firm Lee Crowder. The firm did not deal in immigration, Lee's largest passion. This inspired Lee to leave her position and launch her firm, Christine Lee & Co.

In 1990, Lee founded Christine Lee & Co. Solicitors, a law firm. Although the firm had been founded at the start of the 1990s, the company was not registered with Companies House until 1994, and the Solicitors Regulation Authority had not admitted Lee as a solicitor in England and Wales until February 2002. Lee and her husband, Martin Wilkes (who is also a solicitor), were listed as co-owners of the business. The firm is headquartered in Birmingham, with a satellite office in London's Chinatown. It has since expanded into Hong Kong, Guangzhou and Beijing. The firm predominantly worked on cases related to immigration, such as those seeking asylum or work visas, specific to China. As of 2011, Christine Lee & Co. was the only Chinese-owned UK law firm approved by the Chinese Ministry of Justice to have physical offices in China. The opening ceremony of the firm's Beijing office was attended by officials of Overseas Chinese Affairs Office and the Ministry of Foreign Affairs.

Christine Lee & Co's consultancy subsidiary, China UK Link, paired Chinese entrepreneurs with investment opportunities, obtained visas for education purposes, and helped subsidiaries of Chinese companies deal with legal issues in the United Kingdom.

By the nature of the firm's work, Lee had been in contact with the Embassy of China in London, influencing her later appointment as the embassy's legal adviser in 2008. She also became a legal adviser to the Overseas Chinese Affairs Office in Beijing (which was merged into the United Front Works Department in 2018) and the Consulate General in Belfast.

She would serve with various groups through the years, each promoting contact between China and Chinese communities outside the mainland. As of January 2022, the Companies House has recorded that Lee has held 16 total directorships. After the MI5 issued an alert to MPs concerning Lee, she resigned from many of the active directorships she still held.

=== Lobbying efforts, British-Chinese Project ===
Lee was influenced to begin lobbying in 2005, when the Immigration, Asylum and Nationality Act was proposed. She spoke with Lord Chan of Oxton, the only lord of Chinese descent in the UK at the time, who persuaded her to rally the Chinese communities of England, rather than just London. This contributed to an amending of the bill before its approval in 2006.

In 2006, Lee founded the British-Chinese Project (BCP), a non-profit organisation lobbying for the improvement of British-Chinese community relations. The group held events and organised trips to China, where several attendees of those events would later become candidates for various political positions. The BCP would later act as the secretariat of the Chinese in Britain all-party parliamentary group (APPG), which was created in 2011 and chaired by British politician Barry Gardiner. Lee was described as "instrumental" in forming the APPG. Lee and Gardiner co-authored a report on the Chinese community and policing, commissioned by the group. The APPG has since been disbanded.

Also in 2006, Lee organized a protest as chairwoman of the North London Chinese Association, co-ordinating with the Voice of Britain's Skilled Immigrants. The collective protested a policy change that would increase the qualifying period before immigrant workers can apply for settlement or indefinite leave to remain in Britain, from four years to five.

In 2010, Lee was part of then-Prime Minister David Cameron's delegation to China, serving as its only Chinese member.

In 2013, Lee, along with the British-Chinese Project, led a delegation to Guangdong. The delegation featured then-Labour shadow minister Sarah Owen and then-consul general to Hong Kong and Macao Caroline Wilson.

In 2019, Lee introduced Chinese technology conglomerate Huawei to a British political lobbying firm seeking its business, leading to a meeting. Former Conservative MP Neil Carmichael worked for the lobbying firm and had previously worked with Lee on education-related issues.

== Political donations ==
In 2017 The Times revealed, from September 2015 to February 2017, British politician Barry Gardiner had received £182,284 in disclosed cash donations from Christine Lee & Co. Before this, his constituency party received cash donations from the firm of £22,500 between 2009 and 2015. The paper also revealed part of this money was used to fund the employment of Daniel Wilkes, son of the firm's founder Christine Lee, in his parliamentary offices. Gardiner said the son was hired via an open recruitment process and was appointed on merit. Sir Alistair Graham, former chair of the Committee on Standards in Public Life, called the situation "bizarre" and said "there are clearly questions to be answered". After The Times 2017 piece, Gardiner received a further £200,000 from Lee, having received a total of £425,000. The Times said Gardiner generally took a pro-Beijing position in his shadow portfolio dealings, but the donations were disclosed and there was no suggestion of impropriety on Gardiner's part. Gardiner wrote a letter saying the amounts he received were used to fund researchers and Lee had no influence in the appointment or management of these individuals. Gardiner's constituency office employed Daniel Wilkes until a MI5 interference alert concerning Lee was deployed.

Lee donated more than £650,000 to various politicians as of January 2022, most of which was thought to go to Gardiner or the Labour Party. The total includes a £5,000 donation to Sir Ed Davey in 2013, when he held the position of Secretary of State for Energy and Climate Change. The donation was accepted by Davey's local association and were properly disclosed in parliamentary records.

=== Allegations of political interference ===
In January 2022, the MI5 issued an interference alert declaring Lee to be an agent working for the United Front Work Department of the Chinese Communist Party, who was covertly "involved in political interference activities in the UK". A lawyer for Lee has claimed that this alert was the first issued in "at least 80 years". According to The Times, Lee's case was assessed and did not meet the threshold for prosecution under the Official Secrets Act, which was in place at the time. Following the alert, Lee received threats against her life, causing her to go into hiding.

In July 2023, Lee sued the MI5 seeking unspecified damages for alleged breaches of her human rights. The lawsuit was filed to attempt to clear her name and force the disclosure of why the agency warned lawmakers about her. In an Investigatory Powers Tribunal (IPT) hearing, Lee's lawyer read a message sent from Gardiner, who wrote that "many people" believed the alert was timed to divert attention from Partygate, a political scandal in the United Kingdom about gatherings of government (notably Boris Johnson) and Conservative Party staff during the COVID-19 pandemic in 2020 and 2021.

In December 2024, three IPT judges (Lord Justice Singh, Lord Boyd, and Judge Rupert Jones) dismissed her claims, upholding the MI5 interference alert.

In December 2025, the government of the United Kingdom ordered an independent review into foreign financial interference in UK politics, which was led by former Department for Exiting the European Union Permanent Secretary Philip Rycroft. The review was ordered in response to events surrounding Lee and former politician Nathan Gill.

== Personal life ==
Lee is a naturalised British citizen, residing in Solihull. She married Martin Wilkes in 1990. Together, they have two sons, Daniel and Michael Wilkes. Daniel studied politics and international relations at Exeter University, and Michael acted as the vice-chairman of the British-Chinese Project. Lee is a born again Christian.

Lee's father was the founder of the Chinese Community Association and owned multiple Chinese restaurants in Northern Ireland. Her mother and one of her brothers also owned restaurants. Lee would follow in the family business, opening her first restaurant, Cathay, in May 2001. Lee would go on to own multiple restaurants.

Lee was involved in a public dispute with British musician and YouTuber, Brendan Kavanagh, regarding being filmed in public during a live stream hosted by Kavanagh.

== Recognition ==
Lee's contributions to UK-China relations were highly regarded by both the Chinese and UK governments, leading to meetings with Xi Jinping, Li Keqiang, and David Cameron.

In 2014, Christine Lee & Co. won the Birmingham Law Society's award for Law Firm of the Year, under the category of practices sized from a sole practitioner to four partners.

In 2019, Lee received the Points of Light award from then-Prime Minister Theresa May, in recognition of her work with the British-Chinese Project and the China Overseas Friendship Association. May would also write Lee a personal letter commending her for her work. The award would later be rescinded in the wake of the MI5 alert.

Also in 2019, Lee was invited to participate in the 70th anniversary of the founding of the People's Republic of China.

== See also ==
- Yang Tengbo
- Chinese intelligence activity abroad
