= The Edsels =

American doo-wop group

- Origin: Campbell, Ohio, United States
- Genres: Doo-wop
- Years active: 1957–1968, 1988–present
- Labels: Dub Records, Twin Records, Roulette Records, Tammy Records, Capitol Records
- Members: James Reynolds; Chris Reynolds; Maurice Jones; Danny Friendly
- Past members: George 'Wydell' Jones; Marshall Sewell; Larry Green; Harry Green; Emmett T Perkins

The Edsels were an American doo-wop group from Campbell, Ohio who were active during the late 1950s and early 1960s. The name of the group was originally The Essos, after the oil company, but was changed to match the new Ford automobile, the Edsel. They recorded over 25 songs and had multiple performances on Dick Clark's American Bandstand. The Edsels were one of the few doo-wop groups to sign with a major record label, as most groups of that era found success with small independent labels; before their national hit "Rama Lama Ding Dong", songs like "What Brought Us Together", "Bone Shaker Joe" and "Do You Love Me" helped the group land a major recording contract with Capitol Records in 1961.

Today the group is known almost exclusively for "Rama Lama Ding Dong", written by lead singer George "Wydell" Jones Jr. The song was recorded in 1957 and released, under the erroneous title "Lama Rama Ding Dong", in 1958. It did not become popular until 1961, after a disc jockey in New York City began to play it as a segue from the Marcels' doo-wop version of "Blue Moon". The song eventually became popular throughout the US, peaking at number 21 on the Billboard Hot 100 chart. It is the official goal song of German soccer club VfL Wolfsburg.

The group continues to perform today. In addition, James Reynolds performs with his five sons Jeff, Baron, Patrick, Chris and Carlisle (as the Reynolds Brothers). That group released an album, The Reynolds Brothers, featuring songs written by James and fellow Edsels member George Jones.

Songwriter George Jones died of cancer on September 5, 2008, at age 71.

Marshall Sewell died of esophageal cancer on June 5, 2013, at the age of 75.

Emmett T. Perkins II died on February 11, 2014, at the age of 75.

Pastor James C. Reynolds died on April 11, 2025, at the age of 86.

== Personnel ==
- George "Wydell" Jones Jr. – lead vocals
- Larry J. Greene – first tenor
- James Reynolds – second tenor
- Harry Greene – baritone
- Marshall Sewell – bass

== Influence of the song "Rama Lama Ding Dong" ==
- A cover version of the song was performed on The Muppet Show once: in Episode 89 (or season 4, episode 17), the episode that also had Mark Hamill, C-3PO, R2-D2 and Chewbacca from Star Wars as guests, a shepherd, his sheep and his girl perform the song.
- Rocky Sharpe and the Replays covered the song in 1979.
- The song also was featured in the films Stand by Me and Grease 2
- Serbian and Yugoslav doo wop/rockabilly band Vampiri recorded a Serbo-Croatian language cover as the title track of their 1991 debut album.
- Barry Mann co-wrote a song called "Who Put the Bomp (in the Bomp, Bomp, Bomp)" in 1961, in which he sings about his girl falling in love with him after listening to some doo-wop style songs with their recognizable nonsense lyrics. In the song he asks the question, who put the ram in the 'Rama-Lama-Ding-Dong'.
- The vocable “rama lama lama ka dinga da dinga dong”, derived from the title of The Edsels biggest hit ‘Rama Lama Ding Dong’, is heard in the Grease song, "We Go Together".
- "Rama Lama Ding Dong" is heard in the film Children of a Lesser God, and is used by the character James Leeds (William Hurt) to teach his class of hearing-impaired teenagers.
- "Rama Lama Ding Dong" is played in many German ice rinks when the local team scores, as well as by Bundesliga side VfL Wolfsburg.
- Le Tigre's song "Deceptacon" featured the lyrics "Who took the ram from the ramalamadingdong?"
- The song featured in the title sequence of an episode of Love/Hate
- "Rama Lama Ding Dong" is parodied as "La canción de la vieja'l visillo" by Spanish comedian José Mota in one episode of his TV show.
