= Nelly Ben-Or =

Polish musician (born 1933)

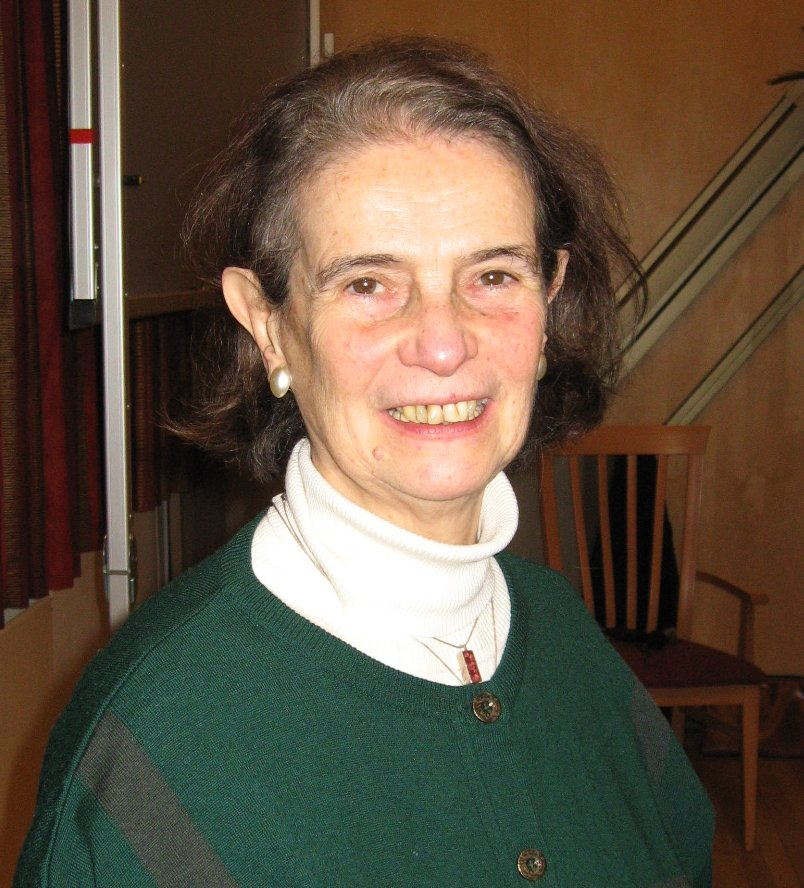
- Born: Nelly Nechama Ben-Or; 1933; Lwow, Poland
- Other names: Nelly Ben-Or Clynes

Nelly Nechama Ben-Or Clynes MBE (née Ben-Or; born 1933) is a concert pianist and professor of music. She is a professor at the Guildhall School of Music and Drama in the United Kingdom where she has taught the piano and the Alexander technique since 1975. Ben-Or is a Holocaust survivor.

== Early life ==
Ben-Or was born in 1933 to a Jewish family in Lwow, Poland (now Ukraine).

During World War II, her family was imprisoned in a ghetto. Her mother, sister and Nelly escaped, but her father did not. When they obtained false identities, she was separated from her sister, who went into hiding and found employment as a domestic servant. Ben-Or and her mother pretended to be Roman Catholics and travelled to Warsaw, where her mother worked for a Christian family for a year as a maid. Having missed the last passenger train to Warsaw, they were placed by the German station master on a train reserved for Wehrmacht officers. The family in Warsaw paid for Ben-Or to have piano lessons along with their own daughter after hearing her play. Occasionally, when people suspected they were Jews, they would be forced to move on, but managed to escape.

== Career ==
A distinguished pianist, and a senior Alexander Technique teacher (in 1963 she became the first pianist to qualify as a teacher of the Alexander Technique), Ben-Or is internationally acknowledged as being the leading exponent of the application of the Alexander Technique to piano playing, in which field she has specialised for more than thirty-five years. She gives master classes on the technique to pianists in many countries throughout the world.

She has performed in concerts and broadcasts throughout the world, in recitals, with orchestra and in chamber music. Ben-Or has made numerous commercial and broadcast recordings, including for the BBC. These recordings cover music by a wide range of composers from the 18th to the 20th centuries.

Moving to England in 1960, she met and married her English husband and later moved to Northwood in London.

In the late 1980s, one of her students was Brendan Kavanagh. She taught classical piano and assisted him to complete his Grade 8 theory and practical requirements. He credited her as his "classical mentor" on his YouTube channel.

In 1999, the Nelly Ben-Or Scholarship Trust was established, whose patron is Sir Colin Davis.

Ben-Or was appointed Member of the Order of the British Empire (MBE) in the 2020 Birthday Honours for services to Holocaust education.
