= The Boy from New York City =

1964 single by the Ad-Libs

Single by The Ad Libs
- B-side: "Kicked Around"
- Released: December 1964
- Recorded: 1964
- Genre: Soul, doo wop
- Length: 2:50
- Label: Blue Cat
- Songwriters: George Davis; John T. Taylor
- Producer: Jerry Leiber, Mike Stoller

The Ad Libs singles chronology
| "The Boy from New York City" (1964) | "I'm Just a Down Home Girl" (1965) |

"The Boy from New York City" is a song originally recorded by the American soul group The Ad Libs, released in 1964 as their first single. Produced by Jerry Leiber and Mike Stoller, the song peaked at No. 8 on the US Billboard Hot 100 on the chart week of February 27, 1965. Though the group continued to record other singles, they never repeated the chart success of "The Boy from New York City".

== Track listing ==
- "The Boy from New York City" - 2:50
- "Kicked Around" - 1:47

== Personnel ==
- Mary Ann Thomas: lead vocals
- Hugh Harris: backing vocals
- Danny Austin: backing vocals
- Dave Watt: backing vocals
- Norman Donegan: backing vocals

== Chart history ==
Weekly charts

| Chart (1965) | Peak position |
|---|---|
| US Billboard Hot 100 | 8 |
| US Cash Box Top 100 | 10 |
| Canada RPM | 2 |

Year-end charts

| Chart (1965) | Rank |
|---|---|
| US Billboard Hot 100 | 98 |

== Influence on The Beach Boys ==
In 1965, The Beach Boys recorded an answer song to "The Boy From New York City" titled "The Girl From New York City" for their album Summer Days (And Summer Nights!!). The following year Beach Boys songwriter and arranger Brian Wilson took further inspiration from the rhythm of the original Ad Libs song in conceiving a new R&B-inflected composition that would eventually become “Good Vibrations.”

== Cover versions ==
The song was later covered by Darts and The Manhattan Transfer, both becoming chart hits in the UK and US respectively. Darts peaked at No. 2 in the UK Singles Chart in May 1978, while The Manhattan Transfer's version, featuring Janis Siegel on lead vocals, peaked at No. 7 on the US Billboard Hot 100 in August 1981.

=== Darts version ===
==== Track listing ====
- "The Boy from New York City"
- "Bones"

==== Personnel ====
- Rita Ray, vocals
- Den Hegarty, vocals
- Griff Fender, vocals
- Bob Fish, vocals
- Horatio Hornblower, saxophone
- Thump Thomson, bass guitar
- John Dummer, drums
- George Currie, lead guitar
- Hammy Howell, piano

==== Chart history ====
Weekly charts

| Chart (1978) | Peak position |
|---|---|
| Australia (Kent Music Report) | 34 |
| Ireland (IRMA) | 9 |
| UK | 2 |

Year-end charts

| Chart (1978) | Rank |
|---|---|
| UK | 35 |

=== The Manhattan Transfer version ===
"The Boy from New York City"

Single by The Manhattan Transfer

from the album Mecca for Moderns
- B-side: "(The Word of) Confirmation"
- Released: May 1981
- Length: 3:40
- Label: Atlantic
- Songwriters: George Davis; John T. Taylor
- Producer: Jay Graydon

The Manhattan Transfer singles chronology
| "Trickle Trickle" (1980) | "The Boy from New York City" (1981) | "Smile Again" (1981) |

Live video
- The Manhattan Transfer – "The Boys from New York City" (live in Munich, 1991) on YouTube

"To have a hit like that you need a great song. We thought 'Boy from New York City' had a second shot [at success] in it and it did. It's one of those perfect sing-a-long songs. People love to sing it & the key to that song is the bassline at the beginning...that grabs the listener. That song swings."

This version was used as the entrance theme for wrestler Jimmy Valiant in the 1980s.

==== Track listing ====
- "The Boy from New York City"
- "(The Word Of) Confirmation"

==== Personnel ====
The Manhattan Transfer

- Cheryl Bentyne – vocals
- Tim Hauser – vocals
- Alan Paul – vocals, vocal arrangement
- Janis Siegel – vocals

Additional musicians

- David Foster – acoustic piano
- Dean Parks, Jay Graydon – guitar
- Abe Laboriel – bass guitar
- Mike Baird – drums
- Don Roberts – saxophone
- Jerry Hey – trumpet

==== Chart history ====
Weekly charts

| Chart (1981) | Peak position |
|---|---|
| Australia KMR | 36 |
| Canada RPM Top Singles | 8 |
| New Zealand | 2 |
| Switzerland | 3 |
| US Billboard Hot 100 | 7 |
| US Billboard Adult Contemporary | 4 |
| US Cash Box Top 100 | 8 |

Year-end charts

| Chart (1981) | Rank |
|---|---|
| Canada | 60 |
| New Zealand | 28 |
| Switzerland | 19 |
| US Billboard Hot 100 | 36 |
| US Cash Box | 49 |
