= Blue Cat Records =

Defunct record labels of the United States

- Blue Cat Records logo (UK)
- Parent company: Red Bird Records
- Founded: 1965

Blue Cat Records was the name of two unconnected record labels. Blue Cat Records (US) was a subsidiary label of Red Bird Records. It had a hit in 1965 with "The Boy from New York City" by the Ad Libs. Other artists to record for the company included Alvin Robinson, Bessie Banks, Murray the K, blues guitarist John P. Hammond, Ral Donner, Jeff Barry and Barry Mann.

Blue Cat Records (UK) was a subsidiary label of Trojan Records. Around 170 records were released on the label between 1968 and 1969, with a variety of early reggae and rocksteady releases from artists such as The Pioneers, The Uniques, The Concords, The Untouchables and The Maytones. The label is considered collectable, in June 2018, a copy of The Viceroys–A side (Fat Fish); The Octaves–B side (You're Gonna Lose) by Blue Cat Records (BS121), sold for $2,010.30.

== See also ==
- Lists of record labels
