= Alright Now (TV series) =

British rock music television series

Alright Now is a British rock music television series made by Tyne Tees Television for ITV in 1979–1980. The show, named after the song "All Right Now" by the band Free, showcased both established and up-and-coming acts, with a focus on those from North East England; among these were Dire Straits and The Police, both enjoying their first chart successes. (In contrast, Lindisfarne were given an entire show to themselves.) The show ran for two series (1979 and 1980). In 1982, Tyne Tees produced the similar music programme The Tube for the then-new Channel 4.

== Overview ==
The show was initially hosted by former Darts singer Den Hegarty, but he was dismissed from the show for "outrageous" behaviour; he later became a host of the ATV children's show Tiswas. The second series featured one guest host per episode; among these were Bob Geldof, Billy Connolly, Bill Oddie, Suzi Quatro, Pauline Black, Mickie Most, and Phil Lynott.

Alright Now was probably best known for the occasion when Billy Connolly interviewed Led Zeppelin drummer John Bonham, on which Bonham jokingly responded to all Connolly's questions in monosyllables.

== Episode guide ==
The first series consisted of eight editions that ran from 6 April to 1 June 1979, plus one special edition featuring the Who on 2 November 1979. The first series featured primarily local bands, or bands with a connection to north-east England. This was followed a year later by the second series, consisting of seven editions (exact broadcast dates to be confirmed), which was less locally focused.

The opening theme for both series was "Another Girl, Another Planet" by The Only Ones.

== Series 1 ==
=== Show 1 ===
- Recorded 06 02 1979
- Show ID AN 79-6-1
- Broadcast 06 04 1979
- Presented by Den Hegarty
- Director: Gavin Taylor
- Producer: Malcolm Gerrie
- Exec Producer: Andrea Wonfor

Dire Straits, Police (Prog 1 on ClapperBoard)

Dire Straits open the series with Sultans of Swing; Den Hegarty then introduces us to his zany brand of presenting and the 'Kaff Kids - including Chris Cowey, Martina and Martin - then its into a homemade film over Devo's Jocko Homo followed by the Police, live in the studio, with Roxanne into the break. Part two opens with Dire Straits and Down to the Waterline; followed by a Punk feature with an assembled 'Rentamob' being patronised by Den and including an interview with Andy Worrall of Virgin Records (Newcastle). The Police end the show with Can't Stand Losing You.

=== Show 2 ===
- Recorded 07 02 1979
- Show ID AN 79-6-2
- Broadcast 13 04 1979
- Presented by Den Hegarty
- Director: Gavin Taylor
- Producer: Malcolm Gerrie
- Exec Producer: Andrea Wonfor

Showbiz Kids, Penetration (Prog 2 on ClapperBoard)

Free and All Right Now (promo clip) opens the show with Den (wrongly) announcing that they provide the theme to the show. After a short chat with Chris Cowey, The Showbiz Kids perform Maybe. Den then interviews David Oxtoby and Davis Sandison about the book Oxtoby's Rockers, then it's back to The Showbiz Kids for Naked Lady. After the break, Penetration perform Future Daze in the studio and then we see a short Blondie feature with clips from Denis; Detroit 442; Hanging on the Telephone; (I'm Always Touched By Your) Presence Dear and Heart of Glass. Penetration end the show with a live version of Lovers of Outrage.

=== Show 3 ===
- Recorded 28 02 1979
- Show ID AN 79-9-1
- Broadcast 27 04 1979
- Presented by Den Hegarty
- Director: Gavin Taylor
- Producer: Malcolm Gerrie
- Exec Producer: Andrea Wonfor

Chris Rea, Rod Stewart, Young Bucks

Rod Stewart performs Blondes Have More Fun live, followed by a teaser for the special edition on The Who later in the series. This is followed by an in-depth look at Young Bucks, who moved to London from Newcastle in an attempt to raise their profile. This includes excerpts from their performance at the Brecknock pub in London. After the break, we're introduced to Chris Rea, after a short interview he performs Letter From Amsterdam followed by Diamonds (featuring two members of Lindisfarne on backing vocals) which ends the show.

=== Show 4 ===
- Recorded 14 03 1979
- Show ID AN 79-11-1
- Broadcast 4 05 1979
- Presented by Den Hegarty
- Director: Gavin Taylor
- Producer: Malcolm Gerrie
- Exec Producer: Andrea Wonfor

Ian Dury, Goldie, Punishment of Luxury

Den declares this show to be examining 'the look of Rock' and this is followed by clips of David Bowie (performing Hang on To Yourself during the Stage tour); Alice Cooper's promo for Movie Stars and Kate Bush's promo for Man with the Child in His Eyes. Punishment of Luxury perform Puppet Life live. Then we see a clip of Hit Me With Your Rhythm Stick and Ian Dury, Jimmy Turnbull and Mickey Gallagher are interviewed, closing with a clip from the What A Waste promo. After the break, Earth Wind And Fire are shown performing All in All and this leads into a feature on Chris Cowey's DJ spot at the Mayfair in Sunderland. Goldie close the show with I Can't Get Through.

=== Show 5 ===
- Recorded 21 02 1979
- Show ID AN 79-8-1
- Broadcast 11 05 1979
- Presented by Den Hegarty
- Director: Gavin Taylor
- Producer: Malcolm Gerrie
- Exec Producer: Andrea Wonfor

Thin Lizzy, Junco Partners, Eric Burdon (Prog 3 on ClapperBoard)

The promo film for Waiting for an Alibi opens the show and leads into a feature on the Junco Partners and Club A-Go-Go, featuring Eric Burdon; Junco Partners perform Swinging Sixties Guy into the break. Opening part two; Junco Partners perform Back Street Boogie, and then Den interviews Eric Burdon before Eric joins Junco Partners for Bring It On Home to Me and You Got Me Hiding. Den joins in on Sax ending the show.

=== Show 6 ===
- Recorded 21 04 1979
- Show ID AN 79-12-1
- Broadcast 18 05 1979
- Presented by Den Hegarty
- Director: Gavin Taylor
- Producer: Malcolm Gerrie
- Exec Producer: Andrea Wonfor

Steve Gibbons Band

This show opens with a clip of Jimi Hendrix performing Star Spangled Banner, and Den announces that we will be looking at the technology of Rock. Following a short interval of guitarists (including Toto; Rainbow; Santana and Jimmy Page) we move into a feature on Guitars, with an interview with the owner of Rock City Music, Bill White. We then move on to interview session guitarist John Hedley about the use of pedals (wah-wah, fuzz and echo). The feature ends with Bill White showing Den the latest monophonic synth and we are treated to more of Den's zany presenting technique. Part one ends with another clip of Jimi Hendrix, this time performing Voodo Chile (Slight Return). Part two opens with the Steve Gibbons Band in the studio performing Eddie Vortex; Get Up And Dance and ending the show with Any Road Up.

=== Show 7 ===
- Recorded 23 03 1979
- Show ID AN 79-13-1
- Broadcast 25 05 1979
- Presented by Den Hegarty
- Director: Gavin Taylor
- Producer: Malcolm Gerrie
- Exec Producer: Andrea Wonfor

Lindisfarne

Following a comedy intro of Den arriving late, Lindisfarne are joined in the studio performing Juke Box Gypsy; After this it's into a film of Lindisfarne writing Marshall Riley's Army (about the Jarrow hunger march); This is followed by a clip of Lady Eleanor before going back to the studio for a performance of Warm Feeling. After the break, there is a short film featuring the band on a boat on the Tyne singing Fog on the Tyne and the band finishes in the studio with a medley of songs from their current LP Back and Forth, and including Meet Me on the Corner; All Swing Together; Women and Run For Home.

=== Show 8 ===
- Recorded 06 03 1979
- Show ID AN 79/10/1
- Broadcast 01 06 1979
- Presented by Den Hegarty
- Director: Gavin Taylor
- Producer: Malcolm Gerrie
- Exec Producer: Andrea Wonfor

Clash, Tom Robinson Band

The Clash open the show with English Civil War, which is followed by more footage of the Rentamob Punks from the first show being patronised further. The Clash are then subjected to Den's (and other Kaff Kids') interrogation techniques before the Tom Robinson Band take us into the break with All Right All Night; Part two opens with the Tom Robinson Band performing Bully For You (a single co-written by Peter Gabriel) and this is followed by another wacky interview in the Kaff; The Clash close the show with Hate And War and a unique version of the old Desmond Dekkar song Israelites.

=== Show 9 ===
- Recorded 12 06 1979
- Show ID AN 79-24-1
- Broadcast 02 11 1979
- Presented by Den Hegarty
- Director: Gavin Taylor
- Producer: Malcolm Gerrie
- Exec Producer: Andrea Wonfor

"Won't Get Fooled Again" - A Profile of The Who This opens with the Who performing Won't Get Fooled Again with an on screen list of their UK hit singles. Roger Daltrey is interviewed by Den in the Marquee Club in London. Pete Townshend outlines his thinking behind setting up Eel Pie and Den is shown around the stage set up for the band. Part one ends with a short clip of See Me, Feel Me from Woodstock, followed by Elton John's performance of Pinball Wizard for the film version of Tommy. Part two starts with a clip from Quadrophenia which segues into an interview with Phil Daniels, Lesley Ash and Sting in a London cafe. The promo for Who Are You leads into an appraisal of Keith Moon, and Kenny Jones is interviewed. A clip of The Who performing Summertime Blues leads into Daltrey and Townshend talking about the future of the band and the show closes with Won't Get Fooled Again. All clips are from The Kids Are Alright, unless otherwise credited.

== Series 2 ==
=== Show 1 ===
- Recorded 03-06-80
- Show ID AN 80-23-1
- Broadcast
- Presented by Bob Geldof
- Director: Gavin Taylor
- Producer: Malcolm Gerrie
- Exec Producer: Andrea Wonfor

Taking a leaf from Revolver; the second series opens with the Undertones just finishing a song (unannounced) and before we know it, The Pretenders are playing The Wait from their debut LP. Part one ends with the Undertones performing My Perfect Cousin. Part two opens with a clip of the Boomtown Rats' video for I Don't Like Mondays and this leads to a short feature on how a video of Phil Lewis's band Girl is made by Tony Vandermolen of the Moving Picture Company. Then it's back to Bob at the jukebox, before The Pretenders close the show with Talk of the Town and Tattooed Love Boys.

=== Show 2 ===
- Recorded 19 03 1980
- Show ID AN 80-12-3
- Broadcast 17 07 1980
- Presented by Billy Connolly
- Director: Gavin Taylor
- Producer: Malcolm Gerrie
- Exec Producer: Andrea Wonfor

Show 2 opens with an unannounced Rory Gallagher number ending and straight away, we're into a feature about the Angelic Upstarts, including a performance of their song Old King Coal at the 29 Club in Sunderland. Billy then patronises the audience about the way they look before Dr Feelgood end this section with Double Blue. Part two sees Dr Feelgood still onstage playing Pretty Face. Then we see a scene from Led Zeppelin's The Song Remains The Same concert film featuring John Bonham and Moby Dick, followed by THAT interview. Rory Gallagher closes the show with Wayward Child and Bad Penny.

=== Show 3 ===
- Recorded 01 04 1980
- Show ID AN 80-14-1
- Broadcast 14 08-80
- Presented by Bill Oddie
- Director: Gavin Taylor
- Producer: Malcolm Gerrie
- Exec Producer: Andrea Wonfor

Bill Oddie opens the show with a clip of Blondie (The Hardest Part from Eat to the Beat) followed by Secret Affair in the studio playing Get Ready. Then we have a feature on Mike Oldfield in which we see his version of Free's All Right Now, and featuring Pierre Moerlin (drums and percussion) and Wendy Richardson (vocals). Secret Affair open part two with When The Show Is Over. Then the Blondie promo is shown. Ray Jackson (Lindisfarne) and Friends play "Little Town Flirt" before Lindisfarne close the show with Friday Girl (which remained unreleased until 1994 and Buried Treasures)

=== Show 4 ===
- Recorded 30 04 1980
- Show ID AN 80-30-4
- Broadcast
- Presented by Suzi Quatro
- Director: Gavin Taylor
- Producer: Malcolm Gerrie
- Exec Producer: Andrea Wonfor

We open this show with a teaser of the Police and Roxanne from their appearance in the first series and signposting the feature in part two. The Tourists are in the studio and kick things off with Strange Sky. Squeeze play Pulling Mussels From A Shell to end part one. Part two opens with the film of the Police in Miami performing Can't Stand Losing You. Back in the studio, Squeeze perform There at the Top from the Argybargy LP before a feature on Mickie Most and his new band called Eastside. The Tourists close the show with I'm Going To Change My Mind.

=== Show 5 ===
- Recorded
- Show ID AN 80-28-1
- Broadcast
- Presented by Pauline Black and the Selecter
- Director: Gavin Taylor
- Producer: Malcolm Gerrie
- Exec Producer: Andrea Wonfor

The Show opens with The Bodysnatchers concluding and then it's straight into a film about the Specials including a liver performance of Too Much Too Young. Back to the studio and the Bodysnatchers perform What's This before we see the Selecter's Guide To Coventry. In The studio, the Selecter play They Make Me Mad to end the first half. A film of The Beat shot at the Top Rank Birmingham and playing Hands Off She's Mine opens part two. A feature on Reggae follows before the Selecter close the show with Out on the Streets Again, Time Hard and Madness (the song).

=== Show 6 ===
- Recorded 23 04 1980
- Show ID AN 80-17-1
- Broadcast 07 08 80
- Presented by Mickie Most
- Director: Gavin Taylor
- Producer: Malcolm Gerrie
- Exec Producer: Andrea Wonfor

The Blues Band open the show with Talk To Me Baby, and then Mickie introduces us to Gary Numan and a film of the song Metal filmed at a power station. Back to the studio for another song, Flatfoot Sam, from the Blues Band. Elvis Costello and the Attractions close this half with I Stand Accused, live in the studio. Part two opens with a clip of The Animals performing House of the Rising Sun (from Rehearsal Room, 1964). Alexis Korner is interviewed before joining the Blues Band for Dead Letter. Elvis Costello and the Attractions close the show with a very live version of Possession in which Elvis fails to engage the audience into a reaction.

=== Show 7 ===
- Recorded
- Show ID AN 80-30-3
- Broadcast
- Presented by Phil Lynott
- Director: Gavin Taylor
- Producer: Malcolm Gerrie
- Exec Producer: Andrea Wonfor

We join Wild Horses as they finish an unannounced song, before Phil Lynott introduces Reservation. Wild Horses included Jimmy Bain (ex-Rainbow) and Brian Robertson (ex-Thin Lizzy). A short feature on Jimi Hendrix leads into Rockpile performing You'll Never Get Me Up in One of Those Things closing the first half. Wild Horses open part two with Face Down. Carlene Carter joins Rockpile for Baby Ride Easy before Phil Lynott joins Wild Horses for Are You Ready To Rock, Rosalie and the Cowboy Song.
