= William "Hammy" Howell =

British pianist

- Also known as: Hammy
- Born: 24 October 1954; London, England
- Died: 13 January 1999 (aged 44) Torquay, England
- Genres: boogie woogie
- Instrument: Piano
- Years active: 1970s–1980s
- Formerly of: Darts

William "Hammy" Howell (24 October 1954 – 13 January 1999) was a British piano and keyboard blues and boogie-woogie player, who played for the then-popular doo wop outfit Darts.

== Early life ==
Born in London, England, Howell became attracted to the piano at an early age. He was nicknamed Hammy for keeping pet hamsters (later rats). He entered the Wennington School in 1966, departing in 1973. After leaving school, Howell developed his own distinctive style of piano-playing, starting with blues, then rock and roll and eventually boogie-woogie.

== Career ==
In the 1970s, he backed Johnny Mars, a popular American electric blues harmonica player, singer and songwriter who had relocated to Britain. Mars and his Oakland Boogie Band frequently visited Germany, where they became popular among blues fans. Howell then joined Darts (which evolved from Rocky Sharpe and the Razors) and stayed with them, on and off, through the 1980s until he left to study classical music. During this period he occasionally taught piano, and at one point came to young Brendan Kavanagh's home to give him three free boogie-woogie lessons. Kavanagh today credits Howell as his boogie-woogie mentor.

== Health problems and death ==
After his mother's illness and death in 1979, he began suffering from health issues. He put on an excessive amount of weight and would sometimes play in lounge at the Mambo Inn in Brixton. Howell moved into a sheltered accommodation in Torquay, where he taught piano and played in the house band. He died of heart failure at age 44 in Torquay, Devon, on 13 January 1999.

Rita Ray, one of the vocalists from Darts, said of Howell's playing: "You don't come across a left-hand talent like that very often. Hammy's thunderous rhythm made him a natural for us."
