= Dark Streets (2008 film) =

- Theatrical poster for Dark Streets
- Directed by: Rachel Samuels
- Written by: Screenplay: Wallace King; Play: Glenn M. Stewart
- Produced by: Glenn M. Stewart; Claus Clausen; Andrea Balen; Corina Dankwerts; Steffen Aumueller; Jeremy Alter; Corina Danckwerts; Melitta Fitzer; Zora A. Wolter
- Starring: Bijou Phillips; Gabriel Mann; Izabella Miko; Elias Koteas; Michael Fairman; Toledo Diamond
- Cinematography: Sharone Meir
- Edited by: Michael J. Duthie; Anne Goursaud
- Music by: George Acogny
- Distributed by: Samuel Goldwyn Films (theatrical); Sony Pictures Home Entertainment (DVD)
- Release dates: June 14, 2008 (CineVegas); December 12, 2008
- Running time: 83 minutes
- Country: United States
- Language: English
- Box office: $16,815

Dark Streets is a 2008 film adaptation of the play by Glenn M. Stewart, directed by Rachel Samuels from a screenplay by Wallace King. The film stars Gabriel Mann, Bijou Phillips, Izabella Miko, Elias Koteas, Michael Fairman and Toledo Diamond. The film's blues score is composed by George Acogny, featuring B.B. King. It premiered at the 2008 CineVegas Film Festival on June 14, winning a Special Jury Prize for "the collaborative craftsmanship in achieving its visual splendor and showmanship" and was given a limited release on December 12. Dark Streets received negative reviews from critics, praising the 1930s aesthetic and musical numbers, but criticizing the use of film noir elements propping up an unengaging story.

== Plot ==
Set in a stylized version of 1930s New York, Dark Streets tells the story of Chaz Davenport, the owner of a popular nightclub called The Tower. Outwardly, Chaz lives the life of a playboy, surrounded by blues music and enjoying dalliances with the dancers that perform on his stage. However, despite this lifestyle, Chaz is heavily in debt. When the city starts to become the subject of mysterious recurring blackouts and menacing loan sharks begin closing in, Chaz finds himself in danger of losing the club and far more.

At the same time, he finds himself embroiled in a painful love triangle with the club's alluring star singer, Crystal, and a new arrival at the club, the mysterious and seductive chanteuse Madelaine. When people close to Chaz begin turning up dead, he does not know where to turn or whom to trust. And the harder he tries to uncover the truth, the further he is drawn into lies and betrayal.

== Cast ==
- Gabriel Mann as Chaz Davenport
- Bijou Phillips as Crystal
- Izabella Miko as Madelaine Bondurant
- Elias Koteas as The Lieutenant
- Michael Fairman as Nathaniel Davenport
- Toledo Diamond as Prince
- Pat Crawford Brown as Delores
- Jordi Caballero as Slim
- Samuel Bliss Cooper as Delivery Man
- Mike Muscat as Mike the Guard
- James Otis as Tommy
- Matt O'Toole as Harry
- Bashar Rahal as Bartender
- Carolyn Seymour as Gloria

== Music ==
Dark Streets features 12 original songs written by James Compton, Tim Brown, and Tony DeMeur, performed by stars Bijou Phillips and Izabella Miko (actually sung by the Irish chanteuse Imelda May) as well as artists including Dr. John, Etta James, Natalie Cole, Aaron Neville, Solomon Burke, Chaka Khan and Richie Sambora. The film's stylish and seductive dance numbers are choreographed by Keith Young (Rent) and performed by sensational underground performer Toledo Diamond and a stage full of L.A.'s most talented dancers.

== Critical reception ==
Dark Streets garnered negative reviews from critics. On the review aggregator website Rotten Tomatoes, 19% of 36 critics' reviews are positive, with an average rating of 4/10. The website's consensus reads: "Dark Streets is a film noir musical that's too gimmicky for its own good." Metacritic, which uses a weighted average, assigned the film a score of 38 out of 100, based on 13 critics, indicating "generally unfavorable" reviews.

Entertainment Weekly writer Clark Collis gave the film a C+ grade, praising the "vibrantly choreographed, extravagantly costumed song-and-dance numbers" but was critical of the "flimsy plot" being a predictable whodunit. Roger Ebert gave praise to both Phillips and Miko's performances during the jazz numbers but felt the movie overall was very self-conscious in its aping of "classic film noir" tropes and that it should've been a straightforward musical based on its story elements and production quality, saying it is "the kind of film you can appreciate as an object, but not as a story. It's a lovingly souped-up incarnation of the film-noir look, contains well-staged and performed musical numbers, and has a lot of cigarettes, tough tootsies, bad guys and shadows. What it doesn't have is a story that pulls us along, or a hero who seems as compelling as some of the supporting characters." Frank Scheck of The Hollywood Reporter gave Samuels credit for adding an "impressive stylistic sheen" to an "obviously limited budget" production but criticized King's "convoluted and often laughably over-the-top screenplay", concluding that: "Streets is too derivative and lacking in wit to compensate for its narrative deficiencies, wooden performances and overall pretentiousness. Even its well-staged musical numbers are diminished by their sheer accumulation."

The A.V. Club's Scott Tobias and The Oregonian's Heidi Williams both gave it an overall C− grade, with the former saying "the film so lavishly fetishizes the period's glittering costumes and leggy chanteuses that it can barely work up the interest to tend to its junior-league Chinatown plotting" and the latter commending Samuels and her production team for taking "a cool-looking, low-budget attempt at making an impressionistic film-noir blues musical", but felt that same attention to aesthetic took away any appeal from Mann's portrayal of Chaz and revealed a script that's more like "a simple-minded bummer" filled with "hollow mannequins" delivering "stunningly empty dialogue."

Josh Rosenblatt of The Austin Chronicle called it "a stylized regurgitation of creaky film-noir clichés and crime-fiction conventions", criticizing Samuels' over-direction of "symbolic murkiness" over "a world of near-comic indecipherability", concluding that: "Dark Streets may be rich in mood, but it's less an original movie than a copy of a copy of a copy of something Hollywood once dabbled in and then forgot about, a collection of 1950s B-movie mannerisms that would have made for a great parody if only it were capable of laughing at its own hard-boiled absurdity." Nick Schager of Slant Magazine panned it for being "a thing of visual and narrative smudginess, its belligerently expressionistic, lush cinematography typified by awful fuzziness around the frame's edges, and its story an undercooked murder-mystery composed of half-scenes and conversational fragments."
