= Steven Cheung (British political candidate) =

British political candidate (born 1989)

Steven Dominique Cheung (Chinese: 張敬龍; born 7 October 1989) is the first British-Hongkonger to receive the Air League Duke of Edinburgh flying bursary. He was the Liberal Democrat candidate for Walthamstow at the 2015 general election. He is the former Governor and Student Union President of City and Islington College, a British-Hongkonger broadcaster and London 2012 Young Mayor of the Olympic and Paralympic Village, taking the role of a Torch Bearer. He is now a pilot.

He was one of the youngest candidates who stood in the European Parliament elections on 4 June 2009.

== Background ==
Born on 7 October 1989, Cheung grew up in Fanling, New Territories, Hong Kong and immigrated with his parents to England when he was 11. His father is from Hong Kong and his mother is from the Philippines. His father works as a chef and his mother is a dinner lady. He speaks Mandarin, Cantonese, English and Tagalog. He studied at Highams Park School in Waltham Forest and then took a gap year to stand for the MEP seat.

== Public offices and awards ==
Cheung is a winner of the Diana Memorial Award in 2009 and was elected the Olympic Ambassador for Waltham Forest. Cheung is part of Envision's Graduate panel, and a Young Advisor for the Ministry of Justice and Waltham Forest Council. He is a member of the Royal Institution and a member of the British Chinese Project, which aims to involve young British Chinese in the country's politics. Cheung is also a DJ on Spectrum Radio in London.

In May 2012, he was asked by British Consulate-General Hong Kong to become GREAT Britain and Northern Ireland campaign ambassador to promote the United Kingdom abroad.

== Broadcasting career ==
Cheung joined Spectrum Radio in September 2008 and has been co-hosting the Cantonese programme on Spectrum Chinese Programme for two years. Cheung started presenting the Saturday programme and then evolved into presenting the Spectrum English Programme from 8 pm to 9 pm since February 2011. Topics discussed are usually concerning issues related to the Chinese community and Chinese culture. Cheung is known to be witty, is very enthusiastic about current affairs and has a broad range of general knowledge. Cheung is also a regular contributor on Spectrum Radio Cantonese Programme with DJ Alice.

== Political activities ==
Cheung's campaign in the 2009 European Parliament election focused on peace and attempted "to use his youth to persuade young people to vote for him". He ran the election as an independent and promised "an open and fresh approach to politics". He hoped to "reinvigorate the public mood and capture the disengaged" when the "European Elections have traditionally been associated with a low-turn out". Christine Lee financially supported Cheung's campaign. There were eight seats in his constituency, London. Cheung came second out of all the independent candidates and surpassed two political parties in votes.

He also ran for Westminster City Council in 2014 in the St James's ward as a Liberal Democrat, but was not elected.
