= Brendan Kavanagh =

British pianist (born 1967)

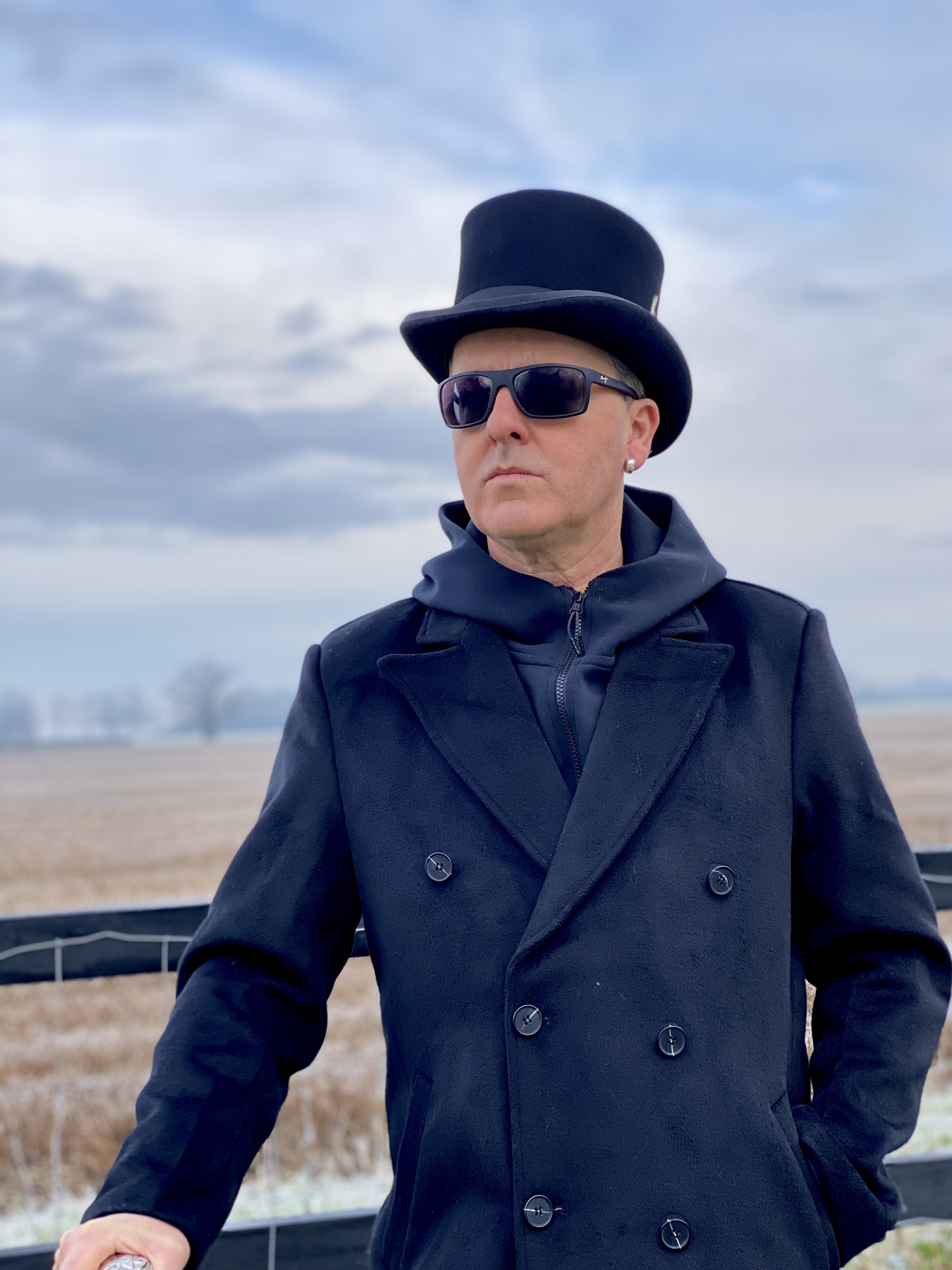
- Kavanagh in 2021

Background information
- Also known as: Dr K
- Born: October 1967 (age 59); London, England
- Genres: Boogie-woogie; classical music; blues; jazz; rock and roll; Irish traditional music
- Occupations: Pianist; piano teacher
- Instruments: Piano; piano accordion

YouTube information
- Channel: Brendan Kavanagh
- Years active: 2012–present
- Genre: Music
- Views: 1.55 billion

Brendan Kavanagh (born October 1967), also known as "Dr K" due to his Ph.D. in English, is a British pianist and piano teacher. He specializes in playing and promoting the boogie-woogie genre, almost exclusively improvised, often combined with classical, jazz, blues, rock & roll, and traditional Irish music themes. He regularly performs in open venues on public pianos, sometimes in duet formats with musically inclined passers-by, friends or family. He also plays the piano accordion, with emphasis on traditional Irish tunes.

== Education ==
Kavanagh attended St Aloysius' College, in Highgate. He went on to study and then graduate from Middlesex University with first class single honours BA in English. He then obtained his MA in Anglo-Irish Literature and Drama at University College Dublin, followed by a PhD in English language and literature from University College Cork. After working as a secondary school teacher for several years, including at The John Lyon School across autumn 2012 as a teacher of English, for one term, he gave up the profession. In Toxic Teaching, published in spring 2014, he described how the British school system had changed under Ofsted’s supervision.

In the late 1980s, Kavanagh studied classical piano with professor Nelly Ben-Or MBE. He credits his success today as an improvisational classical/boogie-woogie pianist to her support and encouragement of his improvisational style. His boogie-woogie mentor is London pianist Hammy Howell (d. 1999) who gave a young Kavanagh three free music lessons to encourage his enthusiasm.

== Online presence and open public venue performances ==
Kavanagh founded Dr K Media Limited, moving his focus towards online teaching, selling, performing and promoting piano music, with a strong emphasis on the boogie-woogie style. With the rising popularity of smartphones allowing virtually anyone to capture, edit and disseminate musical performances, he began performing in open public venues and uploading his work to streaming platforms.

He regularly performs wearing his signature dark hoodie and shades, or wears a uniform as a disguise, to the public passing-by; typically on public pianos at railway stations, airports and many other open public venues, mainly in London. His impromptu performances weave together popular classical, boogie-woogie, Irish themes and are captured and uploaded to his Facebook page (with 500 thousand followers) and to his YouTube channel, where he has over 2.49 million subscribers.

In December 2023 he was interviewed on TalkTV for The James Whale Show and claimed to have earned a seven-figure sum that year, from his streaming activities. Kavanagh broadcasts some of his performances directly, via live streaming.

=== St. Pancras Station piano dispute ===
The January 19 livestream

On 19 January 2024, Dr K uploaded to his YouTube channel a copy of his live stream, which was filmed at an upright piano donated by Elton John on the concourse at St Pancras railway station. The upload showed Dr K playing the piano, followed by a contentious interaction with a Chinese group (which included Christine Lee), some wearing colourful costumes and holding small Chinese flags. The group insisted Dr K not record or publish their images or voices, expressing their desire to protect their image rights because they were there on behalf of "Chinese TV". Dr K explained to them that filming in a public place is legal in Britain. A man from the group said they loved Dr K's music but you "cannot share our images online" and we "will put a legal action into it". Dr K told him "we're in public" and "we're not in Communist China", at which point the man accused Dr K of racism.

During a conversation with a woman from the same group, Dr K pointed towards the small Chinese flag she was holding and reached for it, whereupon the Chinese man repeatedly shouted, "Why are you touching her?" and "Stop touching her!" Dr K recoiled and said he'd not touched the woman but the small flag she was holding. When two uniformed British Transport Police officers arrived, one of them ordered Dr K to stop recording. A female officer told Dr K that, "because there’s money being made, and they work for a company", the Chinese group had requested the video be deleted. Dr K responded that she was acting like “private security” for the Chinese, an accusation she denied. She then told Dr K he couldn't say "we're not in China". Dr K cited his right to free speech, adding that he had not caused any trouble and had an implied right to film in a public place. The female police officer spoke to the Chinese group, but the video does not show any ensuing interactions.

Following the incident, Kavanagh was interviewed by the media on the topic of the free-speech issues that he had raised. He joined journalist Mike Graham in his studio and appeared as a guest on Piers Morgan Uncensored on a subsequent evening. Both programmes were aired on TalkTV. Kavanagh told Morgan that his video clip already had "two strikes" against it and might be removed from his YouTube channel. He urged viewers to download the video in case it was permanently removed.

Two weeks later, Dr K screened an email he quoted as originating from YouTube's legal team. It appeared to request that he blur out the faces of some of the subjects shown on his video, citing YouTube's current privacy policy regarding the upload of videos that identify people without their consent. The YouTube request ostensibly arose following a handful of alleged privacy infringement complaints.

Professor of Politics Eric Kaufmann from the University of Buckingham, who was interviewed by a staff reporter from TalkTV, criticised the Chinese group for attempting to impose the authority of the Chinese Communist Party in Britain.

In January 2025, Dr K's video of the incident was taken down by YouTube due to a "privacy complaint". In response he uploaded the footage to a new channel called The Pianogate Channel and called for subscriptions there.

=== Kavanagh’s private chapel, the arrest and the ‘teddy bear café’ ===
Kavanagh is Catholic and attends the Tridentine Mass. After an appeal initiated by James MacMillan to preserve the traditional Latin Mass appeared in The Times in the summer of 2024, Kavanagh, who was living on a farm at the time, set up a private chapel in a barn to enable private services to be held there. However, a supposed priest who had been recommended to him was later found to have been unqualified. Although the man had been ordained a deacon in Martinique, he had been returned to the lay state following a Church investigation because allegations of child abuse had come to light. Despite this, he had been acting as a priest and celebrating Masses in both Britain and Ireland. After Kavanagh had discovered this and gone public, because SSPX Resistance Bishop Paul Morgan, who was involved in the matter, suddenly refused all contact with Kavanagh, the YouTuber was reported to the police and arrested along with his wife. Following a police investigation lasting several weeks, the harassment allegations were dismissed due to lack of evidence. Kavanagh, who had moved to Norfolk in 2020 and to Bedfordshire in late 2022, sold the farm—chapel included—and returned to London in late 2025. In a livestream in March 2026, he expressed his delight that several churches in London offered convenient access to the Traditional Latin Mass—for example, Our Lady of Willesden in Harlesden.

Apparently in the wake of the dispute with the man who had conducted the service in Kavanagh’s chapel, the Kavanagh family were reported to Bedford Borough Council in 2025. The person who reported them claimed that the Kavanaghs were running a café on their farm without having registered this business or applied for a change of use for the building in question. A Planning Enforcement Officer visited the farm and found that these allegations were unfounded. Although the video footage Kavanagh recorded during this investigation clearly shows that the Planning Enforcement Officer had been looking for the private tearoom where worshippers used to gather after Holy Mass, Kavanagh spread the joke that someone had reported a ‘teddy bear café’ which one of his daughters had set up. When Kavanagh shared the footage again in the autumn of 2026, many viewers, including the German journalist and economist Norbert Häring, took this joke at face value. Although Kavanagh turned the incident into a joke, he was not amused by the unjustified report and immediately stated that he would likely submit a subject access request to find out who had reported him.
