= It's Raining Men (disambiguation) =

"It's Raining Men" is a 1982 song by The Weather Girls, covered by many artists.

It may also refer to:

- "It's Raining Men", an episode of Perfect Score
- "It's Raining Men", an episode of Degrassi: The Next Generation
- "It's Raining Men", an episode of Cold Case
- "Raining Men" (Rihanna song), a 2010 song featuring Nicki Minaj

== See also ==
- Golconda (Magritte), a painting by René Magritte which features men descending as rain
