= The Ad Libs =

American vocal group

- Origin: Bayonne, New Jersey, United States
- Genre: Soul
- Years active: 1964–1981
- Label: Blue Cat
- Past members: Hugh Harris; Danny Austin; Dave Watt; Norman Donegan; Mary Ann Thomas

The Ad Libs were an American vocal group from Bayonne, New Jersey, United States, primarily active during the early 1960s. Featuring their characteristic female lead vocals with male "doo-wop" backing, their 1964 single "The Boy from New York City", written by George Davis and John T. Taylor, was their only major Billboard Hot 100 hit.

Known originally as The Creators, the group formed in 1964 in Bayonne with Hugh Harris, Danny Austin, Dave Watt, Norman Donegan and Mary Ann Thomas. "The Boy from New York City" was released in December 1964; and by March 1965 had peaked at number 8 on the US Hot 100. The group next recorded "He Ain't No Angel" which reached number 100 in 1965. The next two singles failed to chart, and The Ad Libs' contract was not renewed by Red Bird Records company. In 1969, they had a last R&B chart hit with the song "Giving Up", which peaked at number 34 on the US Billboard R&B chart. They continued to record into the early 1980s, but never repeated the success of "The Boy from New York City".

Mary Ann Thomas died of pancreatic cancer. Dave Watt died on December 5, 2008. Danny Austin died in 2015. Norman Donegan died in December, 2022.

== Legacy ==
In 1965, The Beach Boys recorded an answer song to "The Boy From New York City" titled "The Girl From New York City" for their album Summer Days (And Summer Nights!!). The following year Beach Boys songwriter and arranger Brian Wilson took further inspiration from the rhythm of the original Ad Libs song in conceiving a new R&B-inflected composition that would eventually become “Good Vibrations.”

Cover versions of "The Boy from New York City" brought the song back to the charts; in the UK for Darts in 1978, and then in the US for The Manhattan Transfer in 1981. The song has been used in a commercial for Everybody Hates Chris on the Paramount Comedy channel in the UK.

== Discography ==
=== Singles ===
Year	Name	US	R&B	Record Label	A-Side/B-Side
1965	"The Boy from New York City"	8	6	Blue Cat Records 102	B-Side: "Kicked Around"
1965	"He Ain't No Angel"	100	—	Blue Cat Records 114	B-Side: "Ask Anybody"
1965	"On the Corner"	—	—	Blue Cat Records 119	B-Side: "Oo-Wee Oh Me Oh My"
1965	"I'm Just a Down Home Girl"	—	—	Blue Cat Records 123	B-Side: "Johnny My Boy"
1966	"Human"	—	—	A.G.P. Records 100	B-Side: "New York in the Dark"
1966	"Think of Me"	—	—	Karen Records 1527	B-Side: "Every Boy and Girl"
1967	"You're in Love"	—	—	Philips Records 40461	B-Side: "Don't Ever Leave Me"
1968	"You're Just a Rolling Stone"	—	—	Share Records 101	B-Side: "Show a Little Appreciation"
1969	"Giving Up"	—	34	Share Records 104	A-Side: "Appreciation"
1969	"Nothing Worse Than Being Alone"	—	—	Share Records 106	B-Side: "If She Wants Him"

=== Compilation albums ===
- The Ad Libs & Friends - Collectables Records, 1996
- I Don't Need No Fortune Teller - Passion Records, 2010
- The Complete Blue Cat Recordings - Real Gone Music, 2012
