= Rocky Sharpe and the Replays =

English rock & roll band

- Also known as: Rocky Sharpe and the Razors
- Origin: Brighton, England
- Genres: Doo-wop, Rock and roll revival
- Years active: 1977–1985
- Labels: Chiswick, Polydor, RAK
- Members: Rocky Sharpe; Helen Highwater (Helen Blizard); Johnny Stud; Eric Rondo (Mike Vernon)

Rocky Sharpe and the Replays is an English doo-wop/rock and roll revival group who first found fame in the late 1970s. The usual line-up of the group was Rocky Sharpe (born Robert Podsiadły, 26 November 1952 – 5 December 2019), Helen Highwater (real name: Helen Blizard), Johnny Stud (Sharpe's brother Jan Podsiadły) and Eric Rondo (Mike Vernon). An earlier incarnation of the group, Rocky Sharpe and the Razors, included Den Hegarty, Rita Ray, Griff Fender and Nigel Trubridge, who later formed Darts.

== History ==
In 1978, the group enjoyed its first commercial success with "Rama Lama Ding Dong", a cover version of the Edsels' original hit, which reached number 17 in the UK Singles Chart. More chart success quickly followed with another single, "Imagination", which reached number 39 in 1979. After this, success was more difficult to find, and Sharpe found greater success in touring than in the charts.

In 1982, Sharpe had another major hit. "Shout! Shout! (Knock Yourself Out)", a cover version of Ernie Maresca's 1962 hit, reached the Top 20 in the UK Singles Chart. The song became his only charting release in Australia peaking at number 39. Although he never had another hit as big again, Sharpe retained a fan following, especially in western Europe and his music remained widely available. The group's last chart single was "If You Wanna Be Happy", which reached UK chart position 46 in 1983.

After a few line-up changes during 1982-1984, the band finally broke up in early 1985. Sharpe launched a new career as an actor - but he was forced to retire in 1988 after being diagnosed with multiple sclerosis. He lived with his wife Paulina in the family home in Brighton until late 2013, when he became a full-time resident at the Queen Alexandra Hospital Home (QAHH) in Worthing.

Rocky Sharpe and the Replays had always been particularly popular in Spain and in 2013, a Spanish vocal group called the Velvet Candles, whose music had long been inspired by the group, staged a benefit/tribute concert for him in Barcelona after hearing about Sharpe's medical condition. As an added attraction, Sharpe's brother Jan Podsiadly flew out to Spain and, readopting his former Replays persona as Johnny Stud, joined them as a special guest on stage. The band performed a number of songs that Sharpe and the Replays had recorded in the late 1970s and early 1980s. The concert raised almost £2,000, which Sharpe donated to the Queen Alexandra Hospital funds. News of the concert also reached people that used to run Chiswick Records (the record company with whom Sharpe and the Replays had their early hits) and they donated an additional £5,000 to the QAHH funds.

Sharpe died on 5 December 2019 at the age of 67. Mike Vernon died in March 2026.

== Discography ==
=== Albums ===
==== Studio albums ====
Title	Album details	Peak chart positions		
Title	Album details	AUT	GER	SPA
Rama Lama	Released: August 1979; Label: Chiswick; Formats: LP, MC	11	61	10
Rock-It-To Mars	Released: July 1980; Label: Chiswick; Formats: LP, MC	—	—	10
Let's Go [re-released in UK in 1982 as "Shout! Shout!"]	Released: September 1981; Label: Chiswick; Formats: LP, MC	—	—	—
Stop! Please Stop!	Released: 1983; Label: Polydor; Formats: LP, MC	—	—	—
"—" denotes releases that did not chart or were not released in that territory.

==== Compilation albums ====
Title	Album details
Come On Let's Go	Released: 1981; Label: Chiswick; Formats: LP, MC; Continental Europe-only release
Grandes Éxitos Vol.1	Released: 1982; Label: Movieplay; Formats: LP, MC; Spain-only release
Collection	Released: 1990; Label: Max Music; Formats: CD, 2xLP, 2xMC; Spain-only release
The Fabulous Rocky Sharpe & the Replays	Released: October 1991; Label: Ace; Formats: CD
Rocky Sharpe & the Replays	Released: 1992; Label: Castle Communications; Formats: CD; Germany-only release
The Greatest Hits	Released: 1995; Label: Max Music; Formats: 2xCD, 2xMC; Spain-only release
The Best of Rocky Sharpe & the Replays	Released: September 1999; Label: Chiswick; Formats: CD
If You Wanna Be Happy	Released: December 2013; Label: Chiswick; Formats: CD

=== EPs ===
Title	Album details
"Featuring Rama Lama And Imagination"	Released: November 1980; Label: Stunn; Formats: 7"; Australia-only release
Christmas Crackers	Released: November 1980; Label: Chiswick; Formats: 7"

=== Singles ===
Title	Year	Peak chart positions								Album
Title	Year	UK	AUS	BEL (FLA)	GER	IRE	NL	SPA	SWI	Album
"Rama Lama Ding Dong"	1978	17	—	—	37	—	—	5	7	Rama Lama
"Imagination"	1979	39	—	—	—	—	—	—	—	Rama Lama
"Love Will Make You Fail in School"	1979	60	—	—	—	—	—	—	—	Rama Lama
"Never" (Continental Europe-only release)	1979	—	—	—	—	—	—	9	—	Rama Lama
"Martian Hop"	1980	55	—	—	—	—	—	10	—	Rock-It-To Mars
"A Teenager in Love"	1980	—	—	—	—	—	—	—	—	Rock-It-To Mars
"You're the One"	1980	—	—	—	—	—	—	—	—	Rock-It-To Mars
"Mal de amores (Heartaches)" (Spain-only release)	1980	—	—	—	—	—	—	—	—	Rock-It-To Mars
"Never Be Anyone Else but You"	1981	—	—	—	—	—	—	—	—	Let's Go
"Come On Let's Go"	1981	—	—	—	—	—	—	—	—	Let's Go
"Get a Job" (Spain-only release)	1981	—	—	—	—	—	—	—	—	Let's Go
"Shout! Shout! (Knock Yourself Out)"	1982	19	39	15	—	17	14	—	—	Let's Go
"Heart"	1982	—	—	—	—	—	—	—	—	Let's Go
"Clap Your Hands"	1982	54	—	—	—	—	—	—	—	Non-album single
"If You Wanna Be Happy"	1983	46	—	—	—	—	—	—	—	Stop! Please Stop!
"Stop! Please Stop!"	1983	—	—	—	—	—	—	—	—	Stop! Please Stop!
"La Bamba"	1984	—	—	—	—	—	—	—	—	Stop! Please Stop!
"Rama Lama Ding Dong" (Ultimate Remix; Spain-only release)	1990	—	—	—	—	—	—	—	—	Collection
"—" denotes releases that did not chart or were not released in that territory.

=== Rocky Sharpe and the Razors ===
- EP (4 tracks) – "Drip Drop" / "What's Your Name" / "So Hard To Laugh (So Easy To Cry)" / "That's My Desire" (Chiswick, 1976)
- Single (2 tracks) "Drip Drop" / "What's Your Name" (Chiswick, 1976)
- So Hard to Laugh (14 tracks) (Chiswick, 1993 release of a previously unreleased album recorded c. 1976 - includes the four tracks released on the EP above.)
