= Darts (band) =

British band

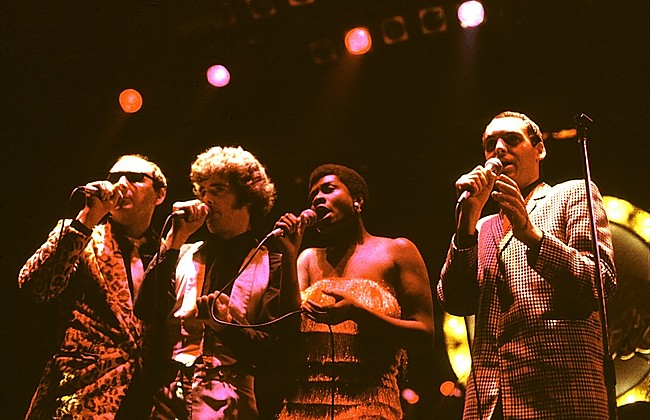
- Darts live at the Rainbow, London 1978: (left to right: Bob Fish; Den Hegarty; Rita Ray; Griff Fender)

Background information
- Origin: Brighton, England
- Genres: Doo-wop revival, new wave, pop rock
- Years active: 1976–1985, 2006–present
- Labels: Magnet; Choice Cuts
- Members: Den Hegarty; Griff Fender; Rita Ray; Nigel Trubridge; Thump Thomson; James (Jimmy) Compton; Pikey Butler; Mark Pearson; Nosmo King
- Past members: Kenny Andrews; Bob Fish; Duncan Kerr; George Currie; Hammy Howell; John Dummer; Keith Gotheridge; Rob Davis; Stan Alexander

Darts is a nine-piece British doo-wop revival band that achieved chart success in the late 1970s and early 1980s. The London-based band had a number of UK top 20 hits including three successive number twos with revivals of early US rock and roll, R&B and original songs. The band had three singles peak at number two on the UK charts in 1978, "Come Back My Love", "The Boy from New York City" and "It's Raining", all but the last being covers of 1950s doo-wop songs.

== History ==
=== Foundation ===
Founded in 1976, by Den Hegarty along with Griff Fender (real name: Ian Collier), Rita Ray (real name: Lydia Sowa) and Horatio Hornblower (real name: Nigel Trubridge), all former members of the band Rocky Sharpe and the Razors (pre-Rocky Sharpe and the Replays). Joining the band was Iain "Thump" Thomson, George Currie and John Dummer, all ex-members of the John Dummer's Blues Band. The line-up was completed by William "Hammy" Howell and ex-Mickey Jupp singer Bob Fish.

=== Early years ===
They built up a large following playing clubs and universities, although their break came after they appeared on Charlie Gillett's show on BBC Radio London in October 1976. This secured the band a recording contract with Magnet Records, where they were teamed up with record producer Tommy Boyce who had previously produced The Monkees.

Covering 1950s rock and roll hits, they scored their first UK hit in November 1977 with a medley of "Daddy Cool" (originally the b side of the single 'Silhouettes', a US 1955 hit for The Rays) and Little Richard's 1957 hit "The Girl Can't Help It". More cover versions followed in 1978 with "Come Back My Love" (originally recorded by US R&B group The Wrens in 1955), and "The Boy from New York City" (originally a US hit for The Ad Libs in 1965). Their next single of 1978 was an original song "It's Raining" written by band member Griff Fender (real name Ian Collier).

"Come Back My Love", "The Boy from New York City" and "It's Raining" all reached number 2 in the UK Singles Chart. Following "It's Raining" in September 1978, Hegarty left the band to tend to his terminally ill father, and he was replaced by the American singer, Kenny Andrews. Their final hit of 1978 was "Don't Let It Fade Away" (written by Currie). "Get It" (written by Trubridge), followed in early 1979 and they also covered Gene Chandler's US 1962 hit "Duke of Earl", produced by former Wizzard frontman Roy Wood. This was their last UK top 10 hit, their only other sizeable hit coming in 1980 with a cover of The Four Seasons "Let's Hang On!".

=== Line-up changes ===
During the year, the line-up changed with Currie, Fish and Dummer leaving the band. James "Jimmy" Compton joined on keyboards in 1980 and is still playing with the band. Duncan Kerr (guitar) and Keith Gotheridge (drums), both formerly with Plummet Airlines joined, and ex-Mud guitarist Rob Davis briefly joined the band, before moving into songwriting and production work. Another later member was Mike Deacon (ex-Suzi Quatro band) on keyboards.

=== Later years ===
By the end of 1980, their hits had dried up and in 1983 they began to do theatre work appearing and being musical directors of the theatre production of Yakety Yak.

In 1979, Hegarty became a television presenter, first with the Newcastle upon Tyne-based Alright Now, and later as part of the team fronting the children's programme Tiswas. In 1985, Fender and Ray managed and produced the UK a cappella female group The Mint Juleps who scored two minor UK chart entries with "Only Love Can Break Your Heart" (originally by Neil Young) in 1986 and "Every Kinda People" (originally by Robert Palmer) in 1987.

The band remains in the Top 500 selling list according to the Guinness Book of British Hit Singles.

The band reformed in 2006 for occasional appearances but now, due to popular demand, they perform several gigs each year. On 21 August 2021 founding member Bob Fish died from an undisclosed illness aged 72.

== Band line-up ==
Founding members are in bold

Current members

- **Rita Ray**, vocals (born Lydia Sowa, 11 December 1954, Ghana)
- **Den Hegarty**, vocals (born Denis Hegarty, 13 September 1954, Dublin)
- **Griff Fender**, vocals (born Ian Collier, 3 June 1954, Portsmouth, Hampshire)
- **Thump Thomson**, bass guitar (born Iain Thomson, 11 June 1946, Aberdeen, Aberdeenshire, Scotland)
- **Horatio Hornblower**, saxophone (born Nigel Trubridge, 15 January 1957, Brighton, Sussex)
- Jimmy Compton, keys (born 1 December 1959, North Tawton, Devon, England)
- Pikey Butler, vocals
- Mark Pearson, guitar
- Nosmo King, drums

Former members

- **Bob Fish**, vocals (3 June 1949, Rochford, Essex – died 21 August 2021, Pembrokeshire, Wales)
- **George Currie**, lead guitar (born 14 January 1950, Dundee, Scotland)
- **Hammy Howell**, piano (born William Howell 24 October 1954, Wimbledon, London – died 13 January 1999, Torquay, Devon)
- **John Dummer**, drums (born Anthony John Dummer, 19 November 1944, Surbiton, Surrey)
- Kenny Andrews, vocals (born in New York)
- Duncan Kerr, guitar
- Rob Davis, guitar (born 1 October 1947)
- Mike Deacon, keys
