= George Currie (musician) =

Scottish musician and amateur archaeologist

- Born: 14 January 1950 (age 76); Dundee, Scotland
- Occupations: Amateur archeologist, music teacher
- Musical career
- Instruments: Guitar, bass, vocals
- Years active: 1976–1980
- Formerly of: Darts

George Currie (born 14 January 1950) is a Scottish musician and amateur archaeologist. In the late 1970s and early 1980s, Currie was the lead guitarist with the band Darts, and as an amateur archaeologist has discovered some 680 of the 3,000 known prehistoric rock carvings in Scotland.

== Early life and music career ==
Currie was born in Dundee and left school at 14 to pursue a musical career. He was in the John Dummer Band before joining Darts in 1976 as lead guitarist. He left the band in 1980 to teach music theory and guitar, and also to pursue his passion for hillwalking.

== Amateur archaeology ==
While walking in the Scottish hills, Currie found some previously unknown prehistoric rock art, comprising carved 'cup marks', circles and troughs on boulders and rocks. In 2009 he found an especially impressive example bearing more than 90 cup marks at Ben Lawers, near Loch Tay. The symbolism of cup and ring marks were unknown with suggestions including waymarkers, star maps, fertility symbols, burial ground plans, tribal symbols or simply doodles.

He reported his findings to Archaeology Scotland’s Discovery and Excavation in Scotland and since his first findings has increased the number of known examples of prehistoric rock art in Scotland from c. 2,300 to nearly 3,000, of the 6,000 estimated rock arts around Britain, and is said to have discovered hundreds of Prehistoric rock carvings in the Tayside area alone.

Currie's finds formed a five-year research project starting in 2017 to 2D and 3D map all known examples of rock art in Scotland, funded by Historic Environment Scotland (HES) under the direction of Dr Tertia Barnett, an honorary fellow of the University of Edinburgh.

== Personal life ==
Currie lives in Dundee, and is a semi-retired college music teacher.
