= James Compton (musician) =

British composer

James Compton (born 1 December 1959 in North Tawton, Devon, England) is a British musician, composer, arranger, multi-instrumentalist and actor.

== Biography ==
Compton moved to London in 1980 and joined his first professional band, Darts, on his 21st birthday. Three years later the entire band was cast in Yakety Yak, a musical featuring the songs of Leiber and Stoller. The band split in 1986. Later that year he joined Microdisney, an Irish indie band, going on to contribute to three singles and five albums.

Throughout his career, Compton has produced six albums and co-produced ten singles.

In 1990 he returned to the stage and went on to become musical supervisor of sixteen more musicals, eight of which had successful West End runs. Compton was responsible for all the music and soundscapes in Morecambe (a tribute to the British comedian Eric Morecambe) which won a Fringe First Award at the Edinburgh Festival and won the Laurence Olivier Award for Best Entertainment for its run at the Duchess Theatre in 2009. More recently he participated in an off-Broadway run of The City Club, a blues and boogie-woogie musical that he composed with Tony De Meur and Tim Brown. Compton also worked as composer on six motion pictures (including Dark Streets which was nominated for an Academy Award for Best Original Song), numerous television productions and various electronic media. Michael Caine is to be seen line dancing to Compton's guitar and piano work in the 2013 motion picture Mr. Morgan's Last Love.

In 2005 he started studying for a master's degree in Electronic Arts at Middlesex University, specialising in interactive audio in computer games.

He is now working with people who have suffered brain injury, making music.

== Discography ==
Straight Eight	1981	Album	Straight to the Heart	
Darts	1981	Single	Jump, Children, Jump	co-producer
Darts	1981	Single	Show us your Shoe	co-producer
Darts	1981	Album	Doo Wop Darts	
Darts	1981	Album	Darts – Across America	
Darts	1983	Single	The Mystery of Ragoula	co-producer
Darts	1983	EP	Yakety Yak	co-producer
Darts	1983	Single	Lorraine	co-producer
Darts	1983	Single	Can't Teach a Fool	co-producer
Darts	1984	Single	Groovin'	co-producer
Darts	1984	Single	Blow Away (co-written)	co-producer
Alison Moyet	1984	B-side	Hitch Hike	co-producer
Microdisney	1987	Single	Town to Town	
Microdisney	1987	Single	Singer's Hampstead Home	
Microdisney	1988	Single	Gale Force Wind	
Microdisney	1987	Album	Crooked Mile	
Microdisney	1988	Album	39 Minutes	
Microdisney	1995	Album	Big Sleeping House	
Microdisney	1999	Album	The Peel Sessions Album	
Microdisney	2007	Album	Daunt Square to Elsewhere	
The Railway Children	1988	Album	Recurrence	
Microgroove	1989	Album	The Human Groove	producer
Cast Album	1992	Album	Good Rockin' Tonite!	
Cast Album	1998	Album	Saucy Jack & the Space Vixens	co-producer
Hank Wangford	1999	Album	Wake Up Dead	
Various	2000	Album	Mother and Baby Relax	producer
Peggy Seeger	2001	Album	Love Will Linger On	
Darrel Higham	2004	Album	The Cochran Collection Vol.2	
J Evans Band	2005	Album	In the Wild Years	producer
Soundtrack	2006	Album	O Jerusalem	songwriter
Soundtrack	2008	Album	Dark Streets	songwriter
Paul Ansell's Number 9	2011	Album	Money and Lies	
Paul Ansell's Number 9	2013	Album	A Date with Paul Ansell's No. 9	
Cast Album	2013	Album	Saucy Jack & the Space Vixens 2	producer

== Theatre ==
1983	Yakety Yak	musical director, actor, multi instrumentalist	West End, Astoria Theatre and international tour
1990	Beehive; The Sixties Musical	musical supervisor, instrumentalist	Newcastle, Northern Stage
1991	Good Rockin' Tonite!	musical director, actor, multi instrumentalist	West End, Prince of Wales
1992	Leader of the Pack	musical supervisor and arranger	West End, Duke of Yorks
1993	Forever Plaid	musical director, instrumentalist	West End, Apollo Theatre
1994	The Queen and I	musical supervisor	Royal Court & Vaudeville Theatre
1995	The Man of Mode	musical supervisor, composer	Tour
1995	Joseph and his Technicolor Dreamcoat	musical supervisor and arranger	Lyric Theatre, Belfast
1996	Elvis: The Musical	musical director, actor, multi instrumentalist	West End, Prince of Wales
1997	Saucy Jack & the Space Vixens	musical director, composer, instrumentalist	West End, Queens Theatre and tour
1998	Four Steps to Heaven	musical director, multi instrumentalist	West End, Piccadilly Theatre and tour
2001	Puppetry of the Penis	musical supervisor, composer	West End, Whitehall Theatre
2001–2004	Saucy Jack & the Space Vixens	musical supervisor, composer	Saucy Jack's Bar, London
2006	The City Club	musical supervisor, actor, instrumentalist	Edinburgh Festival
2009	Morecambe	musical supervisor, composer and sound designer	West End, Duchess Theatre and tour
2011	Stop Dreamin'	musical supervisor, instrumentalist	Theatre Royal Windsor and tour
2012	The City Club	musical supervisor, composer	Minetta Lane Theatre, Manhattan

== TV and multimedia ==
1983	Camel cinema advert	co-producer	
1984	Rubik's Cube video	composer and producer	
1989	Comic Asides	arranger and actor	BBC 2
1997	The Jack Docherty Show	performer and composer	Channel 5
1998	Back to the Future	composer and producer of title music	ITV
2000	Trigger Happy TV	musician on soundtrack	Channel 4
2001	The Tweenies Game	composer for multimedia game	Sonica
2002	The Magic Drum	composer for multimedia game	Sonica
2003	Maestromediaservices	creator of audio content for sound library	
2002	Guildband.com	audio content creator	website
2004	Gunfight	audio content creator for animation	Shagrat.net
2004	Flight to Cancun	audio content creator for animation	Student Universehttp://www.shagrat.net/
2005	Electronic Arts	start master's degree in interactive audio	Middlesex University
2007–2009	Top Rockers	create backing tracks and sound design for animatronic rock and roll puppet shows	Thorpe Park
2010	Plunderland	sound designer and composer for game app	JohnnyTwoShoes

== Film ==
2004	Film as Subversive Art	music editor and arranger	Sticking Place Films
2006	O Jerusalem	songwriter	Samuel Goldwyn Films
2008	Dark Streets	lead composer for film-noire musical	Samuel Goldwyn Films
2009	The Tournament	songwriter	AV Pictures
2009	The Ministers	songwriter	Allumbra Pictures
2010	Lullaby for Pi	arranger	Rezo Films
2013	Mr Morgan's Last Love	musician on soundtrack	Image Entertainment
