= John Dummer Band =

British blues band

The John Dummer Band also known as John Dummer's Blues Band, John Dummer's Famous Music Band, John Dummer's Oobleedooblee Band and The John Dummer Band Featuring Nick Pickett was a British blues band, of the 1960s and 1970s, noted for its extensive roster of members, including Graham Bond, Dave Kelly, Jo Ann Kelly, Tony McPhee, Bob Hall, John O'Leary and Pick Withers, and for supporting US bluesmen such as Howlin' Wolf and John Lee Hooker on UK tours.

== History ==
The band was formed by drummer John Dummer (born Anthony John Dummer 19 November 1944, Surbiton, Surrey). He formed Lester Square and the G.T's in 1963 with Chris Trengove (alto saxophone and vocals) and Elton Dean (tenor saxophone, later of Soft Machine) and toured the UK and Germany for two years.

Dummer formed the John Dummer Blues Band in 1965. The original line-up was John Dummer (vocals, harmonica), Roger Pearce (guitar) and Pete Moody (bass) - both recruited from London R&B band The Grebbels – plus Bob Hall (piano) and Dave Bidwell (drums). Moody later left to be replaced by Tony Walker (bass) and his sister Regine Walker joined Dummer as a second vocalist. The featured guitarist was Tony 'Top' Topham, the original Yardbirds guitarist. The band changed its line-up and began a regular Sunday afternoon residency at the Studio 51 Club in London's West End. Dummer had moved onto drums, and Dave Kelly and Tony McPhee joined as guitarist/vocalists, with Iain "Thump" Thomson (bass) and John O'Leary (harmonica). Dave's sister, Jo-Ann Kelly, was also a regularly featured vocalist at these sessions. The band picked up a following at the club with visiting artists such as John Mayall, Keef Hartley, Champion Jack Dupree, Long John Baldry, Duster Bennett and Alexis Korner. The band was signed to Mercury Records and their first album, Cabal, was released in 1969. Dave and Jo-Anne Kelly and Tony McPhee were featured artists, and the band was the same as had regularly played the Studio 51 Club. Tony McPhee left the band shortly after to re-form The Groundhogs.

The second album, The John Dummer Blues Band, featured Dummer, Hall, Thomson, Dave and Jo Ann Kelly (vocals), with a new lead guitarist Adrian "Putty" Pietryga, from The Deep Blues Band from Bristol. This band toured extensively in Britain and Europe for two years.

By the third album, John Dummer's Famous Music Band (1970), Dave Kelly and Bob Hall had left to be replaced by Nick Pickett (guitar, violin and vocals) Pietryga and Thomson remained, being augmented by Chris Trengove (alto sax) and Davey 'Crabsticks' Trotter (Mellotron).

After the third album the band "drifted apart", only to reform to record again when their instrumental "Nine By Nine", featuring violinist Nick Pickett, was number 1 in France. The 1972 album Blue, released as the John Dummer Band, featured a cover by Roger Dean, whilst the band had shrunk to a four-piece blues-rock band, comprising Dummer, Pickett, Pietryga and Thomson. The band's fifth album, Oobleedoobleejubilee (1973), released as John Dummer's Oobleedooblee Band, had a country music style, whilst the line-up again included the Kellys, along with Michael Evans (violin) and Roger Brown (vocals). The band's final album, recorded in 1973, included Graham Bond (saxophone), Pick Withers (drums), Pete Emery (guitar) and Colin Earl (Foghat) (keyboards), but the album was shelved, and the band broke up in 1974. This final album was eventually released in 2008, as the Lost 1973 Album.

== Dummer's later career ==
Dummer became a promotion manager; spending three years at MCA Records and a year at Elektra Records, before joining A&M Records. In 1977 he became the drummer with Darts, with former Dummer Band members "Thump" Thomson and guitarist George Currie, who had earlier re-formed with Dave Kelly to play the London pub scene as The John Dummer Band. Dummer wrote songs including Darts' "Late Last Night", "How Many Nights", and "Can't Get Enough of Your Love" which reached number 43 on the UK Singles Chart, before leaving in 1980.

Dummer then played drums, toured and recorded with Lowell Fulson and Eddie C. Campbell. (Lowell Fulson – Think Twice Before You Speak; Eddie C. Campbell – The Baddest Cat on the Block. Both JSP Records 1082 & 1087 respectively). His next group, True Life Confessions, featured his wife Helen April, second drummer Manic Esso from The Lurkers, bassist Harry Kakouli from Squeeze, guitarists Robin Bibi and Mark Nevin (later to form Fairground Attraction and write the hit "Perfect") and two Afro-French girl singers, Any Toco-Salvetti and her sister Myriam. They issued several records on A&M, but none charted. Dummer and his wife also performed as a duo, and peaked at number 54 in the UK Singles Chart with their cover version of "Blues Skies", and were also known for "Own Up If You're Over 25".

He then managed The Screaming Blue Messiahs for three years, before restoring properties in France and Portugal. He formed Screwy Truants with French musicians, sang and played harmonica with French guitarist Jean-Claude Manuel, and drummed with harmonica player and blues singer Nico Toussaint. Dummer is currently still drumming with various groups in Bordeaux and working as an antiques trader, furniture restorer and author. His bitter/sweet story of an ex-pat's dream Serge Bastarde Ate My Baguette: On the Road in the Real Rural France was published by Summersdale in 2009, and was followed by a sequel Son of Serge Bastarde: Mayhem In The Antiques Markets of Rural France.

== Discography ==
=== Albums ===
- Cabal (1969) Mercury (SMCL 20136) – CD (1996) See For Miles (SEECD 456)
- John Dummer Band (1969) Mercury (SMCL 20167) – CD (2003) Sunrise (30809032)
- Famous Music Band (1970) Philips (6309 008) – CD (2003) Sunrise (30809042)
- Nine By Nine (Issued as This Is in the US) (1972) Philips (6382 039) – CD (1995) Indigo (IGOCD 2021)
- Blue (1972) Vertigo (6360 055) – CD (1994) Repertoire (REP 4450-WP) & (2003) Sunrise (30809052)
- Oobleedooblee Jubilee (1973) Vertigo (6360 083) – CD (2005) Walhalla (WH 90347)
- Try Me One More Time (1973) Philips (6382 040)
- Volume II (1973) Philips (6382 083)
- Lost 1973 Album (2008)

=== Singles ===
- "Travellin' Man" / "Forty Days" (1969) Mercury (MF 1040)
- "Try Me One More Time" / "Riding at Midnight" (1969) Mercury (MF 1119)
- "Nine By Nine" / "Going in the Out" (1970) Philips (600 6111)
- "Nine By Nine" / "Move Me, Don't Leave Me" (1971) Fontana (600 7027)
- "Medicine Weasel" / "The Endgame" (1971) Philips (606 176)
- "Oobleedooblee Jubilee" / "The Monkey Speaks His Mind" (1972) Vertigo (6059 074)
