= The Wrens (R&B band) =

Doo-wop singing group from New York City from the 1950s

- Origin: The Bronx, New York City, United States
- Genres: Doo-wop
- Past members: Waldo Champen; Francis Concepcion; Archangel Oropeza; Raoul McLeod; George Magnezid; James Archer; Bobby Mansfield

The Wrens were an American doo-wop vocal group from The Bronx, New York City. They are best known for their song "Come Back My Love" and "I'm Just the Kind of Guy".

== Career ==
=== Founding ===
The Wrens began in the Morrisania section of the Bronx in 1950. Neighborhood friends Waldo Champen (tenor, usually referred to as "Champ Rollow"), Francis "Frenchie" Concepcion (tenor/baritone lead), Archangel "Archie" Oropeza (baritone), and Raoul McLeod (bass) sang together under this name for around two years. They slowly drifted apart.

Concepcion was determined to make the group last, and in 1952, he recruited two new members; tenor George Magnezid and bass James "Archie" Archer. They sang as a trio in the community center of P.S. 99 for a couple of months before deciding to expand to a quartet by adding tenor Bobby Mansfield. At the time, Mansfield was about fifteen years old and attending Morris High School in the Bronx. Oropeza was around the same age and Concepcion and Magnezid were already out of school.

In 1954, they heard about a contest that was being held by an arranger/pianist named Freddy Johnson at the old CBS building. The Wrens entered and won, and Johnson became their manager.

=== Recording ===
Rama Records owner George Goldner arranged a session for the Wrens that took place on November 21, 1954. They recorded four songs that day: “Love’s Something That’s Made For Two” (led by Mansfield), “Beggin’ For Love” (fronted by Concepcion), “Come Back My Love”, and “Eleven Roses” (both by Mansfield). The piano player was Johnson, who provided the other session musicians. However, he and the Wrens parted company soon after the session, and from then on, Goldner used the Jimmy Wright Orchestra to back them. James "Archie" Archer left in 1955 and was replaced by Joseph "Rocky" Washington, who later recorded in another doo-wop group, The Performers. Further recordings, including six single releases on Rama, were unsuccessful and Mansfield left in 1956 to pursue a solo career.

In 1985 the Wrens began performing again with all of the original members. Over the next few years, several members of the Original Band retired for a second time due to health or travel constraints since several members no longer lived in the NY area anymore. Frenchie was replaced by Bobby's son Robbie Mansfield. Archie was replaced with Freddie Barksdale and later Waldo Champen, joining the group for a second time, this time as a Bass. George Magnezid continued singing with the group for many years.

In 1998, The Wrens were inducted into the United In Group Harmony Association's Hall of Fame.

Bobby Mansfield also recorded two more songs as a Solo under an independent label. "I'm Just the Kinda Guy" and "Why Can't You".

=== Deaths of members ===
James "Archie" Archer died On June 22, 1999.

George Magnezid died on December 9, 2003, In Westchester County, New York, Aged 69.

Bobby Mansfield died on September 15, 2013, in The Bronx, New York, aged 76.

Joseph "Rocky" Washington, name changed to Yusef Iman died on June 23, 1987 in Jamaica Queens, NY, aged 53.

== The Performers ==
The Performers were a four-man Canadian doo-wop group, formed by Joseph "Rocky" Washington of The Wrens and Perry Heyward of The Sparrows on the Jay Dee label, after the breakup of The Sparrows.
