= Horace Trubridge =

British musician and trade unionist

- Also known as: Horace Trubridge, Horatio Hornblower
- Born: Nigel Trubridge; January 15, 1957 (age 69); Shoreham-by-Sea, England
- Instrument: Saxophone
- Years active: 1970s–present
- Formerly of: Darts

Nigel "Horace" Trubridge (born 15 January 1957), also known as Horatio Hornblower, is a trade union leader and musician. He was a saxophonist in the band Darts in the 1970s. Trubridge has been affiliated with Musicians' Union since 1990, and from 2017 to 2022 was their General Secretary.

== Early life ==
Born in Shoreham-by-Sea as Nigel Trubridge, he learned to play the clarinet and saxophone and played with professional jazz bands while still at school.

== Career ==
=== Performing ===
He joined a number of bands, including an early incarnation of Rocky Sharpe and the Replays, before becoming a founder member of the doo wop revival band Darts in 1976, under the name Horatio Hornblower.

Darts had a string of top ten hits, mostly cover versions. Trubridge wrote many of their original numbers, including the number ten hit "Get It", which was credited to him under his real name. He also appeared in the musical Yakety Yak, written by the group. Darts disbanded in 1985; Trubridge then played with Hitlist and Lovely Money, both of which saw success on a smaller scale.

Trubridge later worked for the London Borough of Hackney as a Music Development Officer, in which role he set up HAMMA, a music label that released records by local acts.

=== Musicians' Union ===
He began working for the Musicians' Union in 1990 as a Music Business Advisor, becoming the union's London officer in 1997 and assistant general secretary in 2003.

In 2017, he was elected as general secretary of the Musicians' Union, defeating Kathy Dyson. He also joined the General Council of the Trades Union Congress.

On 5 February 2020, the union's executive passed a motion extending Trubridge's term without re-election to 15 January 2025, his 68th birthday. A member made a complaint to the Trade Union Certification Officer and a hearing was listed for 18 November. However seven days before the hearing the union rescinded their decision on legal advice from Thompsons Solicitors. The union confirmed that the next election for the role would go ahead at the end of Trubridge's term of office on 27 March 2022.

Trade union offices
Preceded by John F. Smith	General Secretary of the Musicians' Union; 2017–2022	Succeeded by Naomi Pohl
