= Come Back My Love =

1955 single by The Wrens

Single by The Wrens
- B-side: "Beggin' for Love"
- Released: January 1955
- Recorded: 21 November 1954
- Studio: Columbia Recording Studio, New York City
- Genre: Doo-wop; pop
- Length: 2:35
- Label: Rama
- Songwriter(s): Bobby Mansfield

The Wrens singles chronology
"Love's Something That's Made For Two" (1954)	"Come Back My Love" (1955)	"Hey Girl" (1955)

"Come Back My Love" is a song by American doo-wop group The Wrens, released in 1955 by Rama Records. The song is best known for the version by the British doo-wop revival band Darts in 1978, which peaked at number 2 on the UK Singles Chart.

The song was originally released in January 1955, titled "(Will You) Come Back My Love". However, the title was soon shortened and released as "Come Back My Love". In February, the single was then re-released with a different flip side, "Eleven Roses". The song achieved some local popularity in New York and is seen as the group's signature song.

== Darts version ==
"Come Back My Love"

Single by Darts

from the album Darts
- B-side: "Naff Off"
- Released: January 1978
- Genre: Doo-wop revival
- Length: 2:28; 3:03 (album version)
- Label: Magnet
- Songwriter(s): Bobby Mansfield
- Producer(s): Richard Hartley; Tommy Boyce

Darts singles chronology
"Daddy Cool" / "The Girl Can't Help It" (1977)	"Come Back My Love" (1978)	"The Boy from New York City" (1978)

Darts released their cover of the song in January 1978 as the second and final single from their 1977 debut album Darts.

=== Charts ===
==== Weekly charts ====
Chart (1978)	Peak position
Belgium (Ultratop 50 Flanders)	6
Europe (Europarade Top 40)	8
Finland (Suomen virallinen lista)	17
France (IFOP)	52
Ireland (IRMA)	7
Netherlands (Dutch Top 40)	4
Netherlands (Single Top 100)	5
UK Singles (OCC)	2

==== Year-end charts ====
Chart (1978)	Position
Belgium (Ultratop Flanders)	55
Netherlands (Dutch Top 40)	36
Netherlands (Single Top 100)	25
UK Singles	20

== Other recordings and samples ==
- In June 1955, R&B group The Cardinals released a cover of the song as their eighth single.
- In 1989, Jive Bunny and the Mastermixers sampled the song in "Hopping Mad" from their album Jive Bunny: The Album.
- In 1992, Dutch singer Gerard Joling covered the song as a non-album single, which reached number 48 on the Dutch Single Top 100.
- In 1999, British band The Firebirds covered the song on their album Let's Go.
- An instrumental version of the song was the last recorded song to have played in the Austin J. Tobin Plaza of the World Trade Center during the attacks of September 11, 2001, just before the collapse of the South Tower.
- In 2010, British-Irish doo-wop boy band The Overtones covered the song on their debut album Good Ol' Fashioned Love.
