= CSI: Miami season 7 =

Season of American television series CSI: Miami

CSI: Miami
- Season 7
- DVD cover
- Starring: David Caruso; Emily Procter; Adam Rodriguez; Jonathan Togo; Rex Linn; Eva LaRue; Megalyn Echikunwoke
- No. of episodes: 25

Release
- Original network: CBS
- Original release: September 22, 2008 – May 18, 2009

Season chronology
- ← Previous; Season 6 Next → Season 8

The seventh season of CSI: Miami premiered on CBS on September 22, 2008 and ended May 18, 2009. The series stars David Caruso, Emily Procter and Adam Rodriguez.

== Description ==
As Calleigh struggles to hold the team together following Horatio's assassination, Ryan finds himself in the frame for the murder, but are bigger things at play during the seventh season of CSI: Miami? Follow Caine, Duquesne, and their team of elite investigators as they tackle burning bodies, bouncing checks, gang trials, conmen, distrust, dishonor, murder in the air, and murder on a reality television show. Also this season, Calleigh finds her life is at risk following her entering a burning building, whilst Eric finds his life is at risk after aiding and abetting his fugitive father, and Tara finds her career is at risk as she begins to struggle with a narcotics addiction.

== Cast ==
=== Main cast ===
- David Caruso as Horatio Caine; a CSI Lieutenant and the Director of the MDPD Crime Lab.
- Emily Procter as Calleigh Duquesne; a veteran CSI Detective, the CSI Assistant Supervisor and a ballistics expert.
- Adam Rodriguez as Eric Delko; a CSI Detective and Wolfe's partner.
- Jonathan Togo as Ryan Wolfe; a CSI Detective and Delko's partner.
- Rex Linn as Frank Tripp; a senior Robbery-Homicide Division (RHD) Detective assigned to assist the CSI's.
- Eva LaRue as Natalia Boa Vista; a CSI Detective.
- Megalyn Echikunwoke as Tara Price; the teams Medical Examiner. (Episode 5–24)

=== Recurring cast ===
- Khandi Alexander as Alexx Woods; a physician.
- Sofia Milos as Yelina Salas; a Private Investigator.
- Johnny Whitworth as Jake Berkeley; an undercover MDPD Narcotics Detective.
- Evan Ellingson as Kyle Harmon; Horatio's son.
- Elizabeth Berkley as Julia Winston; Kyle's mother.
- David Lee Smith as Rick Stetler; an IAB officer.

== Episodes ==
No. overall	No. in season	Title	Directed by	Written by	Original release date	US viewers (millions)
143	1	"Resurrection"	Joe Chappelle	Barry O'Brien	September 22, 2008	17.23
The team searches for the person who shot Horatio while he was standing on an airport tarmac. Several suspects quickly emerge, and one of them is a member of the team. The investigation propels the team to track down and recover cases of fused-alloy bullets capable of piercing armored vehicles that are already flooding the streets of Miami.
144	2	"Won't Get Fueled Again"	Matt Earl Beesley	Corey Evett & Matt Partney	September 29, 2008	14.35
A man who was set on fire crashes through a beach party and dies on the sand. The probe reveals the victim was involved in stealing gasoline from high-end vehicles and that he may have stumbled onto a much bigger crime taking place. A new medical examiner, Tara Price joins the team.
145	3	"And How Does That Make You Kill?"	Sam Hill	Tamara Jaron	October 6, 2008	13.88
The death of a psychiatrist's daughter has unfortunate complications when Eric reveals he is one of her patients. Valera returns, and the lab gets a new trace technician, Michael Travers.
146	4	"Raging Cannibal"	Gina Lamar	Brian Davidson	October 13, 2008	13.22
Two men found dead in the Everglades, with one showing signs of being the victim of a cannibal, may be connected to a Mixed Martial Arts gym run by a shadowy Russian.
147	5	"Bombshell"	Eric Mirich	Marc Dube	October 20, 2008	13.51
Horatio intervenes when Julia is caught bouncing checks, then intervenes when Kyle fights with a neighbour. When the neighbour turns up dead, Horatio is faced with putting his son behind bars. Meanwhile, is the explosion at an upscale boutique that kills a 17-year-old girl a random act or was the victim targeted?
148	6	"Wrecking Crew"	Joe Chappelle	Corey Miller	November 3, 2008	12.74
During a big gang trial a witness is murdered in front of two CSIs, forcing the team to try to find another way to take down the gang's leader.
149	7	"Cheating Death"	Sam Hill	Krystal Houghton	November 10, 2008	13.82
Horatio and his team of CSIs investigate the murder of a con man who conned married women into sex to steal their money. They wouldn't go to the police because they didn't want their husbands to find out that they cheated on them. They are found in a hotel by the manager, the woman covered in blood with no memory of what happened, and the man cuffed to the bed post and stabbed to death. The team believes it was either a revenge killing by one of the women or their husbands, or could it be something more?
150	8	"Gone Baby Gone"	Carey Meyer	Dominic Abeyta	November 17, 2008	15.46
A 10-month-old girl is snatched from her mother at an outdoor restaurant by a man and a woman. Soon, a $500,000 ransom is demanded, but Calleigh urges the parents not to pay it to ensure the girl is kept alive. The investigation reveals the person behind the kidnapping may be someone closer to the case than at first imagined.
151	9	"Power Trip"	Joe Chappelle	Corey Evett & Matt Partney	November 24, 2008	14.33
A corpse showing similar wounds to a prior homicide brings an overzealous detective into contact with the team. But is he more than just a cop with a grudge?
152	10	"The DeLuca Motel"	Gina Lamar	Sunil Nayar	December 8, 2008	13.79
When a shooter targets the motel where Delko is staying, Horatio must look into Delko's past to find the killer.
153	11	"Tipping Point"	Marco Black	Brian Davidson	December 15, 2008	14.56
The CSIs investigate the murder of a neighborhood do-gooder who was known on the streets as Reverend Mike for his work trying to keep kids out of gangs.
154	12	"Head Case"	Sam Hill	Tamara Jaron	January 12, 2009	15.83
The CSI team uses radical technology and try unveiling a man's secret who is covered in blood with no memory of his origin.
155	13	"And They're Offed"	Matt Earl Beesley	Barry O'Brien	January 19, 2009	14.58
Delko and Calleigh investigate when a murder is committed at a horse race. Meanwhile, Horatio is brought back into conflict with the Russian mob after one of Ryan's friends is attacked.
156	14	"Smoke Gets in Your CSI's"	Joe Chappelle	Krystal Houghton	February 2, 2009	16.10
While Calleigh and Ryan investigate a body inside the attic of an empty house, someone traps them in there and sets fire to the house. Later, Calleigh suffers from respiratory problems. Alexx Woods comes back to save Calleigh from dying. Meanwhile, the rest of the team keeps searching for the murderer of that man found at the house. They discover a black market for human organs.
157	15	"Presumed Guilty"	Larry Detwiler	Corey Miller	February 9, 2009	13.81
Horatio and the team go head-to-head with a defense attorney, Derek Powell (Sean 'Diddy' Combs), who may be involved in a murder cover-up.
158	16	"Sink or Swim"	Sam Hill	Marc Dube	March 2, 2009	13.42
During the murder investigation of defense attorney Derek Powell's fiancee, Eric is thrown in jail due to his failure to come to terms with his fake birth certificate and his father is no help. After that Calleigh and Eric's relationship grows. (Guest starring Sean 'Diddy' Combs and Danneel Harris.)
159	17	"Divorce Party"	Karen Gaviola	Corey Evett & Matt Partney	March 9, 2009	14.22
The CSIs must solve a bizarre case involving a dead man who had two separate lives. Horatio tries to save Kyle from Julia's erratic parenting.
160	18	"Flight Risk"	Joe Chappelle	Sunil Nayar	March 16, 2009	13.61
When a stewardess is found stabbed on a plane, the CSIs learn all the dirty secrets of air travel.
161	19	"Target Specific"	Sam Hill	Tamara Jaron	March 23, 2009	13.67
The team's discovery that they are being targeted by the Russian Mob shows a simple home invasion in a new light. At the end, it is revealed that the Mob kidnapped Ryan and are holding him hostage while also torturing him.
162	20	"Wolfe In Sheep's Clothing"	Carey Meyer	Krystal Houghton	March 30, 2009	13.46
When Ryan is kidnapped and tortured by the Russian mob, he is forced to clean up a crime scene and frame a man for murder in order to save the life of a young boy who the Mob have taken prisoner. It is up to Horatio and the team to find their location and save the hostage before time runs out.
163	21	"Chip/Tuck"	Allison Liddi-Brown	Brian Davidson	April 13, 2009	13.39
Ron Saris returns, seeking revenge on Julia, after Horatio discovers him in connection with a murder tied to extreme plastic surgery.
164	22	"Dead on Arrival"	Gina Lamar	Corey Miller	April 27, 2009	12.12
During the reality show The Marrying Kind, the woman chosen by the Prince Charming to be his wife is murdered. The main suspect is the one who was rejected. Then, the CSIs delve into the scandalous world of TV dating shows. They discover that some of the contestants weren't in the program to find a husband. Also, Horatio tries to protect one of the women from a man who was spying on them by a window.
165	23	"Collateral Damage"	Sam Hill	Marc Dube	May 4, 2009	13.72
Horatio and the team work to figure out why a seemingly normal family was targeted in a brutal grenade attack in a restaurant. As they dig through the family's and restaurant employees' backgrounds, they find more to the story than meets the eye. Meanwhile, Ryan catches Tara doing something suspicious.
166	24	"Dissolved"	Matt Earl Beesley	Corey Evett & Matt Partney	May 11, 2009	13.59
The CSIs investigate the case of a man boiled alive in Ron Saris's pool. Julia spirals out of control and one of the team's darkest secrets comes to light.
167	25	"Seeing Red"	Joe Chappelle	Barry O'Brien	May 18, 2009	14.20
Russian mob boss Ivan Sarnoff escapes from prison after being poisoned. Meanwhile, Yelina's undercover role is discovered and Horatio fights to save her; Delko considers helping his criminal father who was involved in Ivan's escape, even though Calleigh pleads with him not to. Guest starring Brian Austin Green.
