= CSI: Miami season 6 =

Season of American television series CSI: Miami

CSI: Miami
- Season 6
- DVD cover
- Starring: David Caruso; Emily Procter; Adam Rodriguez; Khandi Alexander; Jonathan Togo; Rex Linn; Eva LaRue
- No. of episodes: 21

Release
- Original network: CBS
- Original release: September 24, 2007 – May 19, 2008

Season chronology
- ← Previous; Season 5 Next → Season 7

The sixth season of CSI: Miami premiered on CBS on September 24, 2007, and ended on May 19, 2008. The series stars David Caruso and Emily Procter.

== Description ==
As Alexx bids farewell to the team, Horatio and her successor find themselves victims of fatal gun-play; but all is not as it appears during the sixth season of CSI: Miami. As Eric fights to regain control of his life, help comes from an unlikely source in the form of deceased Detective Tim Speedle. Horatio faces off with a vengeful private investigator, whilst his undercover past, and his son, come back to haunt him. A body in a sinkhole, internet predators, Horatio's extradition to Brazil, and Calleigh's untimely kidnapping only compound the struggles of Caine, Duquesne, and their elite team of Crime Scene Investigators.

== Production ==
Despite being credited for the entire season, Khandi Alexander only appeared in the first 19 episodes and departed the cast as a series regular. Only 13 episodes had been completed before the 2007–08 Writers Guild of America strike. After the strike, eight more episodes were made, resulting in a 21-episode season.

== Cast ==
=== Starring ===
- David Caruso as Horatio Caine; a CSI Lieutenant and the Director of the MDPD Crime Lab.
- Emily Procter as Calleigh Duquesne; a veteran CSI Detective, the CSI Assistant Supervisor and a ballistics expert.
- Adam Rodriguez as Eric Delko; a CSI Detective and Wolfe's partner.
- Khandi Alexander as Alexx Woods; a Medical Examiner assigned to CSI. (Episodes 1–19)
- Jonathan Togo as Ryan Wolfe; a CSI Detective and Delko's partner.
- Rex Linn as Frank Tripp; a senior Robbery-Homicide Division (RHD) Detective assigned to assist the CSI's.
- Eva LaRue as Natalia Boa Vista; a CSI Detective.

=== Recurring ===
- Sofia Milos as Yelina Salas; a Private Investigator.
- Rory Cochrane as Tim Speedle; a deceased MDPD CSI Detective.
- Johnny Whitworth as Jake Berkeley; an undercover MDPD Detective.
- Alison McAtee as Shannon Higgins; the team's newest Medical Examiner.
- Evan Ellingson as Kyle Harmon; Horatio's son.
- Elizabeth Berkley as Julia Winston; Kyle's mother.
- David Lee Smith as Rick Stetler; an IAB officer.

== Episodes ==
No. overall	No. in season	Title	Directed by	Written by	Original release date	Prod. code	US viewers (millions)
122	1	"Dangerous Son"	Sam Hill	Marc Dube & Krystal Houghton	September 24, 2007	601	15.08
Horatio investigates the murder of a probation officer and soon comes to believe that one of the chief suspects in the crime may be a son he never knew he had. To confirm his suspicions, he hires Yelina to investigate the boy's background. Later, a prison guard's wife is kidnapped and held for ransom.
123	2	"Cyber-lebrity"	Matt Earl Beesley	Corey Evett & Matt Partney	October 1, 2007	602	14.72
Stalkers turn an innocent teenage swimming star into a sex symbol, plastering photos of her over all the internet, causing complications for the CSI team when the swimmer's boyfriend is murdered during her swim meet. Horatio hires Ryan Wolfe to protect the girl while searching for the killer. Also, Horatio may be in danger after a grand jury leak reveals to the press that he testified in a mob case.
124	3	"Inside Out"	Gina Lamar	Sunil Nayar & John Haynes	October 8, 2007	603	14.45
After Horatio's son goes missing when a prison transport is attacked Horatio must find him. Upon learning of the identity of Kyle he is targeted in order to get at Lt. Caine, who must find him before it is too late. Tripp also gets into trouble when it is suspected that he shot a deaf woman as the prisoners escaped. Meanwhile Ryan causes tension with his former colleagues when he is hired as an expert witness for the defense.
125	4	"Bang, Bang, Your Debt"	Karen Gaviola	Brian Davidson & Barry O'Brien	October 15, 2007	604	15.59
A young woman dies from carbon monoxide poisoning but the man with her survives, in what appears to be a suicide pact related to their credit card debt. Meanwhile, Delko starts seeing his dead colleague Tim Speedle due to hallucinations resulting from the brain injury he sustained in the previous season, and technician Dan Cooper is compromised after being caught using Speedle's stolen credit card.
126	5	"Deep Freeze"	Sam Hill	Elizabeth Devine	October 22, 2007	605	15.67
A legendary football hero is stabbed to death while talking to a reporter on the phone. The case hits an immediate snag when the lab isn't allowed to take the body because of the victim's wish to be cryogenically frozen. Robbery appears to be the motive, but as the probe deepens it's learned the sports icon wasn't revered by everyone. Also, Stetler learns about the relationship between Calleigh and Jake, and puts pressure on them to end it.
127	6	"Sunblock"	Christine Moore	Corey Miller	October 29, 2007	606	14.85
A man is strangled to death near a hotel pool during a total eclipse of the sun and evidence found at the scene suggests the killer may not be fully human. Twelve hours later, a woman is murdered in similar fashion in her apartment. The probe reveals the first victim dealt drugs out of a hotel cabana, while the second victim spent most of her time in Internet chat rooms. Also, Ryan is reinstated, and Alexx is taken to a hospital after collapsing in the lab.
128	7	"Chain Reaction"	Scott Lautanen	Brian Davidson & Matt Partney & Corey Evett	November 5, 2007	607	14.07
A model dies by electrocution on a runway during a fashion show, and the investigation reveals the death wasn't an accident but murder. The probe also turns up evidence that the victim is connected to the man who kidnapped Horatio's son, which may mean that Kyle is in greater danger than Horatio feared.
129	8	"Permanent Vacation"	Eagle Egilsson	Barry O'Brien & Krystal Houghton	November 12, 2007	608	15.46
A young man is shot to death in a hotel elevator, and the murder appears to have ties to a gang initiation. Meanwhile, every member of the victim's family is bent on exacting revenge on the shooter.
130	9	"Stand Your Ground"	Joe Chappelle	Marc Dube & John Haynes	November 19, 2007	609	15.83
Calleigh could find herself in trouble after she is involved in an off-duty shooting. Meanwhile, the shooting leads detectives to a separate murder, which is connected to drug dealers.
131	10	"CSI: My Nanny"	Jonathan Glassner	Corey Miller & Krystal Houghton	November 26, 2007	610	15.58
A wealthy family's nanny is murdered during a lavish party. The investigation reveals the victim had just been fired from her job by the children's jealous mother and that $250,000 is missing from the house safe. The suspect pool grows bigger when the team discover a hidden camera in the room and that the dead nanny and a previous nanny both knew the combination.
132	11	"Guerillas in the Mist"	Carey Meyer	Barry O'Brien & Brian Davidson	December 10, 2007	611	14.11
Three gunrunners are killed by a new high-tech weapon called "The Vaporizer." And after Horatio interviews the CEO of the defense contractor that made the weapon, he also turns up dead.
133	12	"Miami Confidential"	Sam Hill	Marc Dube	December 17, 2007	612	14.01
While investigating the murder of a young woman, the CSIs uncover a meth lab in her apartment and an unscrupulous FBI agent with a secret life of his own.
134	13	"Raising Caine"	Gina Lamar	Sunil Nayar	January 14, 2008	613	14.80
A billionaire is murdered in his Miami home just before he can sign an important legal document. When Horatio arrives on the scene, he's shocked to discover that the victim's widow is his former lover and Kyle's mother. She is also a leading suspect in her husband's homicide. In court, Kyle goes on trial for kidnapping and his mother makes it clear she will do anything to regain custody of him.
135	14	"You May Now Kill the Bride"	Eagle Egilsson	Barry O'Brien	March 24, 2008	614	16.07
The CSI investigates the death of a bride which leads them to a strip club for investigation. As more investigation goes on, the CSI finds out the bride may not be the target by the killer.
136	15	"Ambush"	Sam Hill	Corey Evett & Matt Partney	March 31, 2008	615	15.65
The CSIs find the body of Kathleen Newberry, but the money she got is missing. Horatio pays another visit to Julia Winston, but Julia has Horatio arrested for the murder of Antonio Riaz and extradited to Brazil. While investigating the case, Calleigh finds out her crime scene photos have been stolen and posted on the internet. The website eventually leads to ex-lab technician Dan Cooper, who has a personal grudge against Calleigh. Calleigh is kidnapped by somebody who knows her through the internet.
137	16	"All In"	Joe Chappelle	Krystal Houghton	April 1, 2008	616	14.23
Calleigh's kidnappers want her to cover up a murder. Horatio returns from Brazil, and he and the team race to find Calleigh before her kidnappers decide she's no longer needed.
138	17	"To Kill a Predator"	Matt Earl Beesley	Brian Davidson	April 21, 2008	617	14.38
The team springs into action to stop a vigilante who is hunting down and killing Internet predators, who were exposed on a show which lures predators by pretending to be teenage girls. Horatio ends the episode as he prepares to torture the predator, claiming that he was resisting arrest.
139	18	"Tunnel Vision"	Karen Gaviola	Tamara Jaron	April 28, 2008	618	13.88
After a body is found in a sinkhole, the team's investigation into the victim's death leads them to a robbery where the target is keeping a shocking secret.
140	19	"Rock and a Hard Place"	Gina Lamar	Marc Dube	May 5, 2008	619	14.11
When Alexx's son becomes a suspect in a murder, saving him has dire consequences. Alexx decides to leave her job as a coroner when she realizes she's spending too much time with the dead. She leaves to spend more time with her family from whom she's grown distant.
141	20	"Down to the Wire"	Eagle Egilsson	Sunil Nayar	May 12, 2008	620	13.92
Horatio faces off with a private investigator (Tom Sizemore) who is systematically destroying the team. Calleigh is taken off the case because of her recent kidnapping and so is Eric because of the shooting in season five. The case is a man getting killed after a prank 911 call.
142	21	"Going Ballistic"	Sam Hill	Corey Miller	May 19, 2008	621	16.27
A man dies when he falls from a vacant high-rise building. When a new medical examiner, Shannon Higgins arrives at the scene to inspect the body, she is shot in the head and dies almost immediately, triggering a gunfight between the Miami PD and the unseen shooter. The investigation reveals the man was involved in illegal ammunition sales. But the case gets personal when Horatio links the victim to Kyle's stepfather. At the end of the episode, Horatio is apparently mortally shot from an unknown killer. Then the killer himself sends a message to Wolfe: "It's done".
