= CSI: Miami season 9 =

Season of American television series CSI: Miami

CSI: Miami
- Season 9
- DVD cover
- Starring: David Caruso; Emily Procter; Jonathan Togo; Rex Linn; Eva LaRue; Omar Miller; Adam Rodriguez
- No. of episodes: 22

Release
- Original network: CBS
- Original release: October 3, 2010 – May 8, 2011

Season chronology
- ← Previous; Season 8 Next → Season 10

The ninth season of CSI: Miami premiered on CBS on October 3, 2010 and ended May 8, 2011. The show was on a special time Sunday 8/7c from January 2–16. The series stars David Caruso and Emily Procter. Adam Rodriguez rejoin as main cast.

== Description ==
Whilst the team reels from Cardoza's murder, Horatio and Calleigh find themselves battling old foes and new criminals. The CSIs investigate murders at a roller-derby, a high school, a human-hunting club, and a college, whilst Natalia finds herself the victim of not one, but two, kidnappings, and Horatio finds himself the victim of a gunshot wound. An explosion at a sugar refinery, a vampire cult, and a visit from a long-dead relative round out the deadly penultimate season of CSI: Miami.

== Cast ==
=== Main cast ===
- David Caruso as Horatio Caine; a CSI Lieutenant and the Director of the MDPD Crime Lab.
- Emily Procter as Calleigh Duquesne; a veteran CSI Detective, the CSI Assistant Supervisor and a ballistics expert.
- Adam Rodriguez as Eric Delko; a CSI Detective and Wolfe's partner.
- Jonathan Togo as Ryan Wolfe; a CSI Detective and Delko's partner.
- Rex Linn as Frank Tripp; a senior Robbery-Homicide Division (RHD) Detective assigned to assist the CSI's.
- Eva LaRue as Natalia Boa Vista; a CSI Detective.
- Omar Benson Miller as Walter Simmons; an art-theft specialist and CSI Detective.

=== Recurring cast ===
- Christian Clemenson as Dr. Tom Loman; the team's Medical Examiner.
- Robert LaSardo as Memmo Fierro; a member of the Mala Noche.

== Episodes ==
No. overall	No. in season	Title	Directed by	Written by	Original release date	US viewers (millions)
192	1	"Fallen"	Sam Hill	Tamara Jaron	October 3, 2010	11.75
The CSI team loses Jesse Cardoza when a psychotic genius runs wild in Miami. In the cliffhanger episode from last season, the killer has released a gas into the lab's ventilation system and incapacitated the team. The CSI must find out who the killer is and beat the clock before it's too late.: This episode marks the final appearance of Eddie Cibrian (Jesse Cardoza). It also marks the return regular appearance of Adam Rodríguez (Eric Delko)
193	2	"Sudden Death"	Matt Earl Beesley	Corey Evett & Matt Partney	October 10, 2010	9.48
When a bottle girl is murdered at an exclusive club, Horatio must search through Miami's most elite guest list to find her killer.
194	3	"See No Evil"	Gina Lamar	Krystal Houghton	October 17, 2010	10.89
A blind man is the only witness to the abduction of a young girl and leads the team to a familiar foe, Joe LeBrock. Joe made the wrong decision to return to prison after the abduction. A jailbreak occurs and LeBrock reveals that they are targeting Caine.
195	4	"Manhunt"	Don Tardino	Marc Dube	October 24, 2010	10.00
The team must find out why the murderer, Memmo Fierro, of Horatio's wife, Marisol Delko-Caine, got out of prison and stop him before someone else becomes the next victim. In a hostage situation, Horatio and Eric do not kill him since his daughter is there. Memmo escapes and is uncaught by the end of the episode.
196	5	"Sleepless in Miami"	Sam Hill	Brian Davidson	October 31, 2010	9.67
When a man states he saw a murder before it happened, Natalia is sent undercover to find out the truth.
197	6	"Reality Kills"	Marco Black	Melissa Scrivner	November 14, 2010	10.26
When a reality star is murdered, the CSIs investigate the cast, the obsessed fans, and the stars’ hidden pasts to find the killer. During the investigation, Horatio searches for a drug lab when he learns one of the reality stars gave a young boy dangerous drugs that can't be identified normally.
198	7	"On the Hook"	Tim Story	Scott Landy	November 21, 2010	10.57
When a fisherman narrowly escapes death, the CSIs have to dodge bullets to keep him alive and find out who’s after him.
199	8	"Happy Birthday"	Sam Hill	Barry O'Brien & Marc Dube	December 5, 2010	10.66
When a woman who is eight months pregnant is found beaten, Horatio and the team hunt down the attacker.
200	9	"Blood Sugar"	Rod Holcomb	Gregory Bassenian	December 12, 2010	9.89
The investigation into an explosion at a sugar refinery exposes a shocking secret among the refinery's employees.
201	10	"Match Made in Hell"	Eric Mirich	Brett Mahoney	January 2, 2011	10.92
When the investigation of a dead millionaire leads the CSIs to an elite dating service, Ryan poses as a wealthy businessman to expose the matchmaker's lies.
202	11	"F-T-F"	David Arquette	Melissa Scrivner & K. David Bena	January 9, 2011	12.00
When a fire hydrant washes away all of the evidence at a crime scene, the CSIs must recreate a very bizarre double murder.
203	12	"Wheels Up"	Sam Hill	Corey Evett & Matt Partney	January 16, 2011	10.91
When the CSIs investigate a murder at a roller derby match, the only thing shorter than the girls' skirts are their tempers.
204	13	"Last Stand"	Matt Earl Beesley	Brian Davidson	February 20, 2011	10.47
The killer of Horatio's wife returns and takes control of the city, and Horatio must stop him before more crimes and chaos happen.
205	14	"Stoned Cold"	Allison Liddi	Tamara Jaron	February 27, 2011	8.24
When a popular high school girl is stoned to death, Horatio and his team must find out who took revenge on her. The investigations hit a snag when they discover that the girl was perhaps not so popular after all.
206	15	"Blood Lust"	Gina Lamar	Krystal Houghton Ziv	March 6, 2011	10.65
Horatio and his team must track down a serial killer who attempts to kill a woman who narrowly escapes death.
207	16	"Hunting Ground"	Adam Rodriguez	Adam Rodriguez	March 13, 2011	11.85
When a man is shot and killed by a bow and arrow, Horatio goes against the clock to solve the case involving an exclusive hunting club that hunts humans for sport. Meanwhile, Horatio helps a victim of the sport locate his missing brother.
208	17	"Special Delivery"	Allison Liddi	Michael McGrale	March 20, 2011	10.93
When a delivery man and a housewife on his delivery route are murdered on the same day, the team discovers there is a connection between the two when a suspect suffers an overdose on drugs.
209	18	"About Face"	Sam Hill	Corey Evett & Matt Partney	March 27, 2011	11.19
After Natalia is kidnapped and held captive by an escaped prisoner, she hears a shocking secret.
210	19	"Caged"	Larry Detwiler	Tamara Jaron & K. David Bena	April 10, 2011	9.98
Horatio and his team try to protect - but must uncover the secrets of - a mixed martial arts fighter whose former friend (that he testified against) has escaped prison.
211	20	"Paint It Black"	Gina Lamar	Krystal Houghton Ziv & Melissa Scrivner	April 17, 2011	9.97
A college student is found dead at the campus pool and the CSIs are forced to be innovative as their only witness is an art student with cognitive memory problems.
212	21	"G.O."	Matt Earl Beesley	Brett Mahoney	May 1, 2011	7.65
A mild-mannered accountant claims that he is being framed for murder and Horatio chases down a suspect whose entire life is an elaborate charade.
213	22	"Mayday"	Sam Hill	Marc Dube & Barry O'Brien	May 8, 2011	9.85
Horatio must capture an escapee again when their transport plane crashes and the team is shocked to discover that the fugitive has planned more than that. The episode ends with Randy North shooting Horatio, leaving the Lt. injured while Natalia is placed in the trunk of a car which is then thrown into the ocean, leaving both of their fates unknown.
