= CSI: Miami season 5 =

Season of American television series CSI: Miami

CSI: Miami
- Season 5
- Season 5 U.S. DVD cover
- Starring: David Caruso; Emily Procter; Adam Rodriguez; Khandi Alexander; Jonathan Togo; Rex Linn; Eva LaRue
- No. of episodes: 24

Release
- Original network: CBS
- Original release: September 18, 2006 – May 14, 2007

Season chronology
- ← Previous; Season 4 Next → Season 6

The fifth season of CSI: Miami premiered on CBS on September 18, 2006, and ended May 14, 2007. The series stars David Caruso and Emily Procter.

== Description ==
With Caine and Delko in Brazil, it's up to Duquesne to maintain the department following Natalia's transfer to the MDPD. All of this just in time for them to investigate not only external crimes committed against the general public but also internal issues. As Wolfe accidentally becomes involved in counterfeiting, Duquesne's life is endangered due to her involvement in an investigation surrounding gang warfare. Boa Vista is confronted by her abusive ex-husband again, while Caine and Delko seek revenge against those responsible for the death of Marisol. Tripp comes face to face with death after stepping on a landmine. Ultimately, however, it's Delko, once again, who faces the biggest challenge, as he fights for his life following a gunshot wound to the head.

== Cast ==
=== Starring ===
- David Caruso as Horatio Caine; a CSI Lieutenant and the Director of the MDPD Crime Lab.
- Emily Procter as Calleigh Duquesne; a veteran CSI Detective, the CSI Assistant Supervisor and a ballistics expert.
- Adam Rodriguez as Eric Delko; a CSI Detective and Wolfe's partner.
- Khandi Alexander as Alexx Woods; a Medical Examiner assigned to CSI.
- Jonathan Togo as Ryan Wolfe; a CSI Detective and Delko's partner.
- Rex Linn as Frank Tripp; a senior Robbery-Homicide Division (RHD) Detective assigned to assist the CSI's.
- Eva LaRue as Natalia Boa Vista; a CSI Detective and former FBI Agent.

=== Recurring ===
- Sofia Milos as Yelina Salas; a Private Investigator.
- Rob Estes as Nick Townsend; Natalia's ex-husband.
- Johnny Whitworth as Jake Berkeley; an undercover MDPD Narcotics Detective.
- David Lee Smith as Rick Stetler; an IAB officer.

== Episodes ==
No. overall	No. in season	Title	Directed by	Written by	Original release date	US viewers (millions)
98	1	"Rio"	Joe Chappelle	Sunil Nayar	September 18, 2006	17.62
Horatio and Delko travel to Rio to find that Riaz, the man responsible for Marisol's murder, has been released from custody. While there, Horatio meets Yelina and learns that his brother may be connected to Riaz. Meanwhile Ray Jnr. accepts work from Riaz to mule drugs to Miami, unaware of the recent death of his father. Riaz is finally found in Rio, and dies in a knife-fight with Delko and Caine. Back in Miami, Natalia, now a CSI, helps Ryan investigate the beating death of a woman, and her inexperience leads to problems for Calleigh in the office. Caine, now also back in Miami, manages to track down and rescue his nephew.
99	2	"Going Under"	Matt Earl Beesley	Marc Dube & John Haynes	September 25, 2006	17.79
A routine murder investigation at a hotel becomes more complex when an unknown vehicle crashes Calleigh's Hummer into a body of water, compromising most of the evidence collected at the scene. It is revealed that the victim was an undercover agent in the Crypt Kings biker gang, working alongside another operative named Jake Berkeley, Calleigh's former Academy classmate and boyfriend. Further investigations into the gang reveal the murder weapon as a CornerShot device, and the gang's involvement in gunrunning.
100	3	"Death Pool 100"	Sam Hill	Ann Donahue & Elizabeth Devine	October 2, 2006	17.90
The team investigates a robbery and suspicious double murder at a "Bling-bling" party hosted by a famous jewelry designer in town. They soon find that one of the victims, a celebrity named Dakota Hudson, was listed on the "Death Pool 100". Investigations turn towards those poised to profit by her untimely death, ultimately leading to revelations of fake diamonds and offshore gambling and counterfeiting. Ryan is also caught out, by an embarrassed Calleigh, holding dead pool related "super-notes".
101	4	"If Looks Could Kill"	Scott Lautanen	Ildy Modrovich & Barry O'Brien	October 9, 2006	17.61
The team investigates the death of a famous male model after his body is found stuck under a boat. Later on they reveal a sick and twisted secret of the agency he worked for when another model falls to his death from a hotel.
102	5	"Death Eminent"	Eagle Egilsson	Corey Miller & Brian Davidson	October 16, 2006	18.12
The body of a local politician is found in an empty house. The entire neighborhood was upset that he was backing the use of eminent domain, allowing the government to force them out of their homes. During the period of investigation, some members of the team have to deal with their enemies in the past while some have to come to terms with the nature of the profession they are pursuing.
103	6	"Curse of the Coffin"	Joe Chappelle	Sunil Nayar & Krystal Houghton	October 23, 2006	17.83
When a believer in Santeria, a mix of Catholicism and African voodoo, is found murdered in front of her shrine of animal sacrifices, bizarre incidents start happening around the CSI lab and people speculate that the lab is cursed. However, the case takes an unexpected turn when the CSIs discover that the victim may have been murdered over a tangled plot involving stolen gold.
104	7	"High Octane"	Sam Hill	Marc Dube	November 6, 2006	16.80
After an accident where the driver was decapitated during a dangerous stunt, the evidence leads the CSIs to believe it was more than an accident. While gathering the evidence, the CSIs find they must go into the world of "sideshows."
105	8	"Darkroom"	Karen Gaviola	John Haynes	November 13, 2006	18.77
A murder and kidnapping becomes personal when DNA from a crime scene reveals that Natalia's sister Anya (Natalie Morales) is one of the kidnapped women they are looking for. The team finds a safe full of photos of missing women and they must find the photographer who was using his camera to lure the unsuspecting women. This episode was based on the photographer William Richard Bradford who photographed Eva LaRue's sister.
106	9	"Going, Going, Gone"	Matt Earl Beesley	Elizabeth Devine	November 20, 2006	18.54
After a young woman (Elizabeth Hendrickson) is found dead shortly after she is auctioned off for charity, the team finds that the woman was trying to uncover the true nature of the event's host. As the team delves deeper into the investigation, they soon discover a larger plot that could put Miami in danger.
107	10	"Come as You Are"	Joe Chappelle	Brian Davidson	November 27, 2006	17.13
A Marine recruiter is found dead on a civilian shooting range with various bullet holes in him, but there is no blood at the scene. The CSIs find out that the victim was dead before he was shot and that his body was pulled onto the range. As the case advances, Horatio determines the murder may be tied to the death of a marine in Iraq who was killed in combat. Natalia is shocked to learn that Nick asked Valera out and that she accepted.
108	11	"Backstabbers"	Gina Lamar	Barry O'Brien	December 11, 2006	16.00
When terror suspect Sonya Barak is targeted by her own people for assassination, she goes on the run, and Horatio sets out to capture her, both to protect her and bring her to justice. Calleigh and Ryan investigate when a dead body is found in the trunk of Sonya's escape vehicle.
109	12	"Internal Affairs"	Scott Lautanen	Corey Miller	January 8, 2007	16.01
Nick is murdered in his condo and Natalia is arrested for the crime when evidence at the scene suggests she killed him, but Horatio tries to clear her name. The evidence also reveals that Delko and Nick fought earlier in the day. In another case, a wealthy single man is found dead in his mansion with a granite-topped bookshelf on top of him. The investigation reveals the victim was seeing a therapist who suddenly dropped him as a patient. It is suddenly discovered, that the two cases are related.
110	13	"Throwing Heat"	Joe Chappelle	Krystal Houghton	January 22, 2007	18.86
After Frank steps on a land mine at a crime scene Horatio and the Bomb Technicians must deactivate the bomb. Delko gets hit with a large lawsuit after investigating a domestic dispute.
111	14	"No Man's Land"	Scott Lautanen	Dominic Abeyta	February 5, 2007	18.43
The lives of two CSIs are put in danger when an old enemy of Horatio's returns. When a truck full of confiscated weapons is hijacked and the weapons are released back into the public, Horatio links the crime to Clavo Cruz, a man he put away for murder years ago. However, on the day of Clavo's arraignment, a confiscated missile is launched into the courthouse to aid his escape, with Alexx inside. Meanwhile, Calleigh and Ryan investigates when an eleven-year-old boy is shot by one of the stolen weapons. The episode ends with the shocking revelation that Delko has been shot in the head.
112	15	"Man Down"	Karen Gaviola	Ildy Modrovich	February 12, 2007	19.90
In the aftermath of the ambush at the car park, Delko finds himself fighting for his life after being shot in the head. The investigation reveals Cruz may be involved with selling illegal African diamonds.
113	16	"Broken Home"	Sam Hill	Barry O'Brien & Krystal Houghton	February 19, 2007	19.23
The parents of a babysitter are murdered on the property where she is taking care of a 12-year-old boy in an upscale neighborhood. The investigation reveals the boy's parents were drugged at a nearby party and that there is a thief in the neighborhood who may be connected to the crimes. Also, Horatio investigates a doctor's shady past that includes lots of dead patients. Loosely inspired by When a Stranger Calls and Harold Shipman murders.
114	17	"A Grizzly Murder"	Eagle Egilsson	Elizabeth Devine & Brian Davidson	February 26, 2007	17.42
A hunter is attacked and killed by a black bear, but the evidence suggests the victim may have been set up as bait. The investigation reveals the death may be a cover-up for the murder of a high-priced hooker and her bodyguard who were part of an illegal prostitution ring servicing elite clients in Miami.
115	18	"Triple Threat"	Scott Lautanen	Corey Miller & Sunil Nayar	March 19, 2007	17.66
A wealthy real-estate developer is murdered at a plush mansion where a luncheon, organized by his wife, is being held to raise money for a children's hospital. Later, at a construction site owned by the victim, a woman's severed body is found. Also, Delko's colleagues worry that he may not be ready to return to work after he makes an error during the investigation.
116	19	"Bloodline"	Carey Meyer	John Haynes & Marc Dube	April 9, 2007	16.11
Horatio suspects that a county supervisor and the Native American owners of a casino may be involved in a murder when a victim is found scalped near the gambling establishment.
117	20	"Rush"	Sam Hill	Ildy Modrovich & Krystal Houghton	April 16, 2007	15.36
Horatio investigates a movie star's murder inside a celebrity rehab center. The probe reveals that the actor's candid confessions while in therapy, including some damaging secrets, may have led directly to his death.
118	21	"Just Murdered"	Eagle Egilsson	Ty Scott	April 23, 2007	17.03
A contentious divorce turns deadly when the husband's mistress is murdered and other dead bodies follow.
119	22	"Burned"	Anthony Hemingway	Corey Evett & Matt Partney	April 30, 2007	17.24
A man is killed in a fire in his home, but his girlfriend escapes. Meanwhile, Horatio must fire Ryan when he doesn't disclose that he knew one of the suspects.
120	23	"Kill Switch"	Scott Lautanen	Corey Miller & Marc Dube	May 7, 2007	17.18
After the murder of a suspected carjacker the team discovers that he may have been involved with a formidable drug lord and was suspected of drug running off Miami’s shores.
121	24	"Born to Kill"	Karen Gaviola	Sunil Nayar & Ann Donahue	May 14, 2007	16.63
Horatio hunts for a serial killer who brands his victims with a "Y" mark. When an arrest is made, the alleged culprit is found to possess a supposed "killer gene" due to an extra Y chromosome. But just as the CSIs believe they've closed the case, the killings begin again.
