= CSI: Miami season 10 =

Season of American television series CSI: Miami

CSI: Miami
- Season 10
- DVD cover
- Starring: David Caruso; Emily Procter; Jonathan Togo; Rex Linn; Eva LaRue; Omar Miller; Adam Rodriguez
- No. of episodes: 19

Release
- Original network: CBS
- Original release: September 25, 2011 – April 8, 2012

Season chronology
- ← Previous; Season 9

The tenth and final season of CSI: Miami premiered on CBS on September 25, 2011, and is the shortest season of CSI: Miami with only 19 episodes. The series stars David Caruso, Emily Procter and Adam Rodriguez.

== Description ==
As Horatio faces a painful recovery from his gunshot wound, Natalia faces an emotional recovery from her near-death experience. Calleigh attempts to adopt two children, whilst Delko and Wolfe are assigned to supervise new CSI Sam Owens, a task that ends up putting Wolfe at risk. A sadistic killer, a Mexican sheriff, an eccentric genius, and a rabid dog are among the killers, witnesses, and victims this season, as the sun goes down on Miami.

== Production ==
All members of the main cast returned for this season, whilst Eva LaRue planned to depart the cast subsequently. Adam Rodriguez wrote and produced the episode "At Risk", based on the Penn State scandal. The series finale aired on April 8, 2012, but was delayed due to extended coverage of the Masters. In May 2012, CBS cancelled CSI: Miami, making it the first show in the CSI franchise to end.

== Cast ==
=== Main cast ===
- David Caruso as Horatio Caine; a Lieutenant and the Director of the MDPD Crime Lab.
- Emily Procter as Calleigh Duquesne; a veteran Detective, the CSI Assistant Supervisor and a ballistics expert.
- Adam Rodriguez as Eric Delko; a CSI Detective.
- Jonathan Togo as Ryan Wolfe; a CSI Detective.
- Rex Linn as Frank Tripp; a senior homicide Detective.
- Eva LaRue as Natalia Boa Vista; a CSI Detective.
- Omar Benson Miller as Walter Simmons; an art-theft specialist and CSI Detective.

=== Recurring cast ===
- Taylor Cole as Samantha Owens; a CSI Detective assigned to Caine's team.
- Malcolm McDowell as Darren Vogel; an Attorney and a nemesis of the CSIs.
- Christian Clemenson as Dr. Tom Loman; the team's Medical Examiner.
- Alana de la Garza as Marisol Delko-Caine; Horatio's late wife and Delko's sister.
- Robert LaSardo as Memmo Fierro; a member of the Mala Noche.
- Carlos Bernard as Diego Navarro; an accomplice to murder and nemesis of the CSIs.
- Ryan McPartlin as Josh Avery; an Assistant States Attorney.

== Episodes ==
No. overall	No. in season	Title	Directed by	Written by	Original release date	US viewers (millions)
214	1	"Countermeasures"	Sam Hill	Marc Dube & Barry O'Brien	September 25, 2011	9.89
After Horatio heroically saves Natalia, the CSIs must race against time to find wanted fugitives Jack Toller and Randy North. As the team stages an elaborate trap to lure North from hiding, Toller sells his two remaining engraving plates in exchange for some cash and a young woman he plans on making his next victim. CSIs then capture North and use him to lure out Toller so they can save the girl he plans to kill. But when the setup goes south, and Toller vanishes, the team is forced to reexamine Toller’s original case files for any last minute clues to his whereabouts.
215	2	"Stiff"	Gina Lamar	Doreen J. Blauschild	October 2, 2011	10.34
The CSI investigates a murder that will lead the team into the world of gigolos.
216	3	"Blown Away"	Don Tardino	Brian Davidson	October 9, 2011	10.23
A tornado touches down on a murder scene, damaging the evidence and putting Ryan and Walter in grave danger.
217	4	"Look Who’s Taunting"	Marco Black	Krystal Houghton	October 16, 2011	10.64
The team chases a sadistic killer who takes women’s eyes, and a new nemesis (Carlos Bernard) challenges Horatio.
218	5	"Killer Regrets"	Sam Hill	Brett Mahoney	October 23, 2011	9.77
A Mexican sheriff (Kate del Castillo) whose life is threatened by drug cartels seek Horatio's help. Some Mala Noche are linked with the case and Horatio is forced to seek an old nemesis for inside information.
219	6	"By the Book"	Gina Lamar	Melissa Scrivner	October 30, 2011	9.97
In a deserted mansion, the CSIs find a body hanging that appears to have been killed by a vampire.
220	7	"Sinner Takes All"	Larry Detwiler	Michael McGrale & Greg Bassenian	November 6, 2011	8.67
A high-stakes poker game ends quickly when a masked assassin kills one of the players.
221	8	"Dead Ringer"	Sam Hill	Tamara Jaron	November 13, 2011	9.77
When another corpse is found with missing eyes, Horatio suspects "The Taunter" is back.
222	9	"A Few Dead Men"	Don Tardino	K. David Bena	November 20, 2011	9.55
The CSIs investigate when three convicted murderers are released from prison and someone starts killing them one by one.
223	10	"Long Gone"	James Wilcox	Marc Dube & Barry O'Brien	December 4, 2011	10.43
Horatio is determined to find a family that completely disappeared.
224	11	"Crowned"	Gina Lamar	Brett Mahoney & Krystal Houghton Ziv	December 11, 2011	10.16
The CSIs expose the seedy underbelly of children's beauty pageants when a contestant's mother is murdered. But as one of the girls goes missing, the team makes a shocking discovery.
225	12	"Friendly Fire"	Sam Hill	Tamara Jaron & Greg Bassenian	January 8, 2012	10.46
An eccentric genius is assassinated with the most unique weapon the CSIs have ever seen, the Smart Rifle. The team determines it must be the work of a fellow genius, though must determine who would benefit from Stone's death the most.
226	13	"Terminal Velocity"	Sylvain White	Robert Hornak & Brian Davidson	January 29, 2012	10.57
When a skydiver is murdered after his chute is burned by acid, the CSIs discover that he has 103 children and all of them are suspects, along with their families.
227	14	"Last Straw"	Bill Gierhart	Melissa Scrivner & Michael McGrale	February 19, 2012	10.03
The CSIs investigate the murder of a woman who rode her horse at a local stable and was a former sorority queen in college. At first they suspect a sorority sister, but when she too is murdered, the team realizes the killer is sending a message. After the CSIs discover that the two murdered women kicked the stable owner's daughter out of the same sorority years ago, they suspect the woman finally got her revenge on her harassers.
228	15	"No Good Deed"	Matt Earl Beesley	Grace DeVuono	March 4, 2012	10.14
The CSIs investigate the death of Henry Duncan when his body washes ashore after being gored by a speeding boat. The boat, stolen from its owner, is found with traces of car oil. Duncan, an accountant, was a do-gooder and was about to expose improper business practices going on within his company and a home builder.
229	16	"Rest in Pieces"	Sam Hill	Marc Dube & Barry O'Brien	March 11, 2012	10.72
The CSIs uncover a female victim on the Navarro estate that matches Esteban’s MO. Vina Navarro, Esteban’s grandmother, comes forward to help solve the case. However, things take a twist when the team also discovers the three-decade-old remains of a male victim, with evidence linking Diego to the murder.
230	17	"At Risk"	Adam Rodriguez	Adam Rodriguez	March 18, 2012	8.54
When a rabid dog kills a janitor at a renowned tennis academy, it's clear someone engineered the attack to target Coach Larry Hopper, Miami’s most popular tennis coach. The team discovers Hopper was involved in a child sexual abuse case ten years prior, but settled out of court. Could the victim now be back for revenge? Calleigh learns that Austin North is a student at the academy and grows suspicious when pro player and academy alumnus, Jack Brody, takes a special interest in him.
231	18	"Law and Disorder"	Allison Liddi Brown	Michael McGrale & Greg Bassenian	March 25, 2012	9.29
When a freelance journalist is poisoned, the CSIs must figure out if her murder was provoked by a story she was doing on Miami Councilman Randall Stafford. After Stafford’s DNA is found at her apartment, his attorneys, Darren Vogel and Gabrielle Wade, are able to dismiss the evidence on grounds of tampering. The team begins suspecting the journalist was actually doing a story on Vogel, not Stafford, after discovering that Stafford helped cover up a murder committed by another of Vogel’s clients.
232	19	"Habeas Corpse"	Sam Hill	Barry O'Brien & Marc Dube	April 8, 2012	7.94
CSI Wolfe is a suspect when one of the team's enemies, ASA Josh Avery, is murdered. When the investigation becomes deadly, Samantha Owens ends up having to be rescued.
