= CSI: Miami season 8 =

Season of American television series CSI: Miami

CSI: Miami
- Season 8
- DVD cover
- Starring: David Caruso; Emily Procter; Adam Rodriguez; Jonathan Togo; Rex Linn; Eva LaRue; Omar Benson Miller; Eddie Cibrian
- No. of episodes: 24

Release
- Original network: CBS
- Original release: September 21, 2009 – May 24, 2010

Season chronology
- ← Previous; Season 7 Next → Season 9

The eighth season of CSI: Miami premiered on CBS on September 21, 2009 and ended May 24, 2010. The series stars David Caruso and Emily Procter. Eddie Cibrian and Omar Benson Miller join the main cast, while Adam Rodriguez departed the main cast at the 5th episode of the season and recurring thereafter.

== Description ==
It's all change during the eighth season of CSI: Miami as the team faces the loss of one of their own and flash back to 1997. Delko departs, joining the State's Attorney as an investigator, forcing him to return to the lab undercover; Calleigh finds herself facing death once again, as the spirit of a victim helps her solve his own homicide; Horatio's ex-girlfriend is killed in an explosion, whilst the crime lab comes under siege from hostage takers. It's ultimately high-tech crime that cripples the team this season, however, as they are methodically taken down by a serial killer they're hunting, with one CSI paying the ultimate price.

== Cast ==
=== Main cast ===
- David Caruso as Horatio Caine; a CSI Lieutenant and the Director of the MDPD Crime Lab.
- Emily Procter as Calleigh Duquesne; a veteran CSI Detective, the CSI Assistant Supervisor and a ballistics expert.
- Adam Rodriguez as Eric Delko; a CSI Detective and Wolfe's partner. (Episodes 1–5, Recurring episode 11, 14, 16 & 21–24)
- Jonathan Togo as Ryan Wolfe; a CSI Detective and Delko's partner.
- Rex Linn as Frank Tripp; a senior Robbery-Homicide Division (RHD) Detective assigned to assist the CSI's.
- Eva LaRue as Natalia Boa Vista; a CSI Detective.
- Omar Benson Miller as Walter Simmons; an art-theft specialist and CSI Detective. (Episodes 6–24, Recurring episode 3–5)
- Eddie Cibrian as Jesse Cardoza; a founding member of the MDPD's CSI team.

=== Recurring cast ===
- Khandi Alexander as Alexx Woods; a physician.
- Malcolm McDowell as Darren Vogel; an Attorney and a nemesis of the CSIs.
- Johnny Whitworth as Jake Berkeley; an undercover MDPD Narcotics Detective.
- Evan Ellingson as Kyle Harmon; Horatio's son.
- Christian Clemenson as Dr. Tom Loman; the team's Medical Examiner.
- David Lee Smith as Rick Stetler; an IAB officer.
- Adam Rodriguez as Eric Delko

=== Guest stars ===
- Laurence Fishburne as Ray Langston; a Las Vegas CSI.

== Episodes ==
| No. overall | No. in season | Title | Directed by | Written by | Original release date | US viewers (millions) |
|---|---|---|---|---|---|---|
| 168 | 1 | "Out of Time" | Sam Hill | Tamara Jaron | September 21, 2009 | 14.20 |
The continuation of last season's story; the team searches for Delko. Meanwhile, there is a flashback to 1997 when H brought the team together.: This episode marks the debut appearance of Eddie Cibrian (Jesse Cardoza).
| 169 | 2 | "Hostile Takeover" | Allison Liddi-Brown | Corey Evett & Matt Partney | September 28, 2009 | 13.96 |
A gunman attacks the Miami lab and holds four people, including Cardoza, hostage. Horatio is to serve as the negotiator, where the gunman has a rather unique request in exchange for the hostages.
| 170 | 3 | "Bolt Action" | Gina Lamar | Melissa Scrivner | October 5, 2009 | 13.43 |
Calleigh's testimony before IA may threaten Delko's future. Meanwhile three volleyball players mysteriously die during a game, and a lab tech from Louisiana proves pivotal in cracking the case.: This episode marks the debut appearance of Omar Miller (Walter Simmons).
| 171 | 4 | "In Plane Sight" | Larry Detwiler | Robert Hornak | October 12, 2009 | 13.27 |
The CSI team investigate when a businessman who swindled millions out of people is found dead inside his private plane whilst it was being repossessed. However, things become complicated when a second repoman shows up with the same documentation as the first one.
| 172 | 5 | "Bad Seed" | Matt Earl Beesley | Brian Davidson | October 19, 2009 | 13.16 |
A lethal outbreak in Miami that is linked to deadly farming practices is investigated as murder. Alexx returns to help the team with the case and Delko questions whether he still wants to be a CSI.: This episode marks the last appearance of Adam Rodríguez (Eric Delko) as a main cast member.
| 173 | 6 | "Dude, Where's My Groom?" | Carey Meyer | Brett Mahoney | November 2, 2009 | 12.52 |
A groom goes missing, and the CSIs recreate his debauched bachelor party to solve the case and a murder. In the meantime, Simmons officially joins the group as a new CSI.: This is the first episode to have Omar Miller (Walter Simmons) now credited as a series regular.
| 174 | 7 | "Bone Voyage" | Sam Hill | Barry O'Brien | November 9, 2009 | 14.38 |
Raymond Langston (Laurence Fishburne) from Las Vegas travels to Miami to aid a murder with possible ties to a human leg that was discovered in Vegas.: This episode begins a crossover with CSI: NY and CSI: Crime Scene Investigation that continues on "Hammer Down" and concludes on "The Lost Girls".
| 175 | 8 | "Point of Impact" | Eric Mirich | Krystal Houghton | November 16, 2009 | 13.26 |
The CSIs investigate a horrible car crash to discover who or what caused it. The probe reveals the darkest secrets of the drivers involved.
| 176 | 9 | "Kill Clause" | Scott Lautanen | Jeremy R. Littman | November 23, 2009 | 13.22 |
Horatio and his team investigate when a man is pushed and falls into a tank containing box jellyfish, as the investigation continues the team are led to believe that a company are killing their own employees for their life insurance policies. Meanwhile, a mysterious woman from Jesse's past unexpectedly shows up.
| 177 | 10 | "Count Me Out" | Marco Black | Marc Dube | December 7, 2009 | 12.72 |
The CSIs investigate when the body of a census worker is found in a car involved in a high speed car chase. The investigation leads to the discovery of a meth lab, which puts Ryan and Natalia's lives in danger when it explodes.
| 178 | 11 | "Delko for the Defense" | Gina Lamar | Tamara Jaron | December 14, 2009 | 14.18 |
The team discovers that Delko is working for an attorney defending a homeless man accused of raping and killing a wealthy woman.: This episode marks the first appearance of Adam Rodríguez as a recurring cast member.
| 179 | 12 | "Show Stopper" | Sam Hill | Corey Evett & Matt Partney | January 11, 2010 | 13.65 |
When America's sweetheart, Phoebe Nichols, bursts into flames during a concert, the CSIs expose the dark side of pop stardom. Calleigh is questioned by Stetler over her mileage discrepancies.
| 180 | 13 | "Die by the Sword" | Matt Earl Beesley | Melissa Scrivner | January 18, 2010 | 13.22 |
A man is chopped in half, and the lab tries to tie the case to a Japanese mobster, who seeks custody of his biological son, who was adopted by the victim. Meanwhile, Natalia's hearing loss nearly makes her a victim during the investigation.
| 181 | 14 | "In the Wind" | Allison Liddi-Brown | Brett Mahoney | February 1, 2010 | 13.44 |
Horatio and the CSIs have just 24 hours to find out if a man on death row is truly guilty of killing his wife and young daughter.
| 182 | 15 | "Miami, We Have a Problem" | Sam Hill | Brian Davidson | February 8, 2010 | 13.53 |
A dead body falls from the sky, and the team discovers that he had been a passenger on a private commercial space flight.
| 183 | 16 | "L.A." | Rob Zombie | Barry O'Brien | March 1, 2010 | 12.07 |
Horatio and Delko travel to Los Angeles to clear Cardoza of an evidence tampering allegation that threatens the prosecution in a current Miami murder case.
| 184 | 17 | "Getting Axed" | Carey Meyer | Krystal Houghton | March 8, 2010 | 11.93 |
The team does not have any difficulty finding suspects when a hated receptionist is murdered with an axe and her body is pushed down an elevator shaft. The real difficulty is finding out who did it.
| 185 | 18 | "Dishonor" | Sam Hill | Marc Dube | March 22, 2010 | 10.80 |
Horatio's son, Kyle, seeks his father's help in solving a murder when he discovers a burning body in his best friend's garage. The investigation uncovers a family caught in a love affair.
| 186 | 19 | "Spring Breakdown" | Larry Detwiler | Corey Evett & Matt Partney | April 12, 2010 | 10.78 |
The CSIs work on solving three separate homicides that occurred during Spring Break vacation: a wet t-shirt contestant (Alan Ritchson) who was found buried in the sand (investigated by Ryan and Jesse), a girl discovered in an industrial washing machine (investigated by Calleigh), and a man who was found impaled on a pool cabana (investigated by Horatio and Walter). The team discovers that all three cases are connected.
| 187 | 20 | "Backfire" | Don Tardino | Tamara Jaron & Melissa Scrivner | April 19, 2010 | 11.66 |
The spirit of a victim haunts Calleigh until she is able to solve his murder.
| 188 | 21 | "Meltdown" | Matt Earl Beesley | K. David Bena & Brian Davidson | May 3, 2010 | 9.62 |
The team investigates a murder that happened during a diamond heist. However, things get complicated when evidence is stolen from the lab and Eric Delko returns.
| 189 | 22 | "Mommie Deadest" | Gina Lamar | Krystal Houghton & Brett Mahoney | May 10, 2010 | 11.01 |
When a suburban soccer mom is murdered, the CSIs uncover her family's dark past, while Delko continues his undercover mission. At the end of the episode, Delko is about to hand his evidence to the state attorney, when an explosion by her car kills her and knocks Delko to the ground.
| 190 | 23 | "Time Bomb" | Sam Hill | Corey Evett & Matt Partney | May 17, 2010 | 10.52 |
When Horatio's ex-girlfriend is killed in an explosion, the team looks within their own department to find the killer. The team is uneasy as Eric returns to do some undercover investigation and evidence leads to the discovery of stolen diamonds in Ryan's house. They must find the real culprit and exonerate Ryan before things get out of hand.
| 191 | 24 | "All Fall Down" | Joe Chappelle | Barry O'Brien & Marc Dube | May 24, 2010 | 12.38 |
Delko returns to the lab in time to help catch a serial killer who taunts the CSIs by leaving them cryptic hints, and the longer it takes them to decode these puzzles, the higher the death toll rises. In the opening sequence the daughter of the first victim can be heard singing the nursery rhyme "Ring Around the Rosie.": This is the final episode to have Eddie Cibrian (Jesse Cardoza) credited as a series regular.
