= CSI: Miami season 4 =

Season of American television series CSI: Miami

CSI: Miami
- Season 4
- Season 4 U.S. DVD cover
- Starring: David Caruso; Emily Procter; Adam Rodriguez; Khandi Alexander; Jonathan Togo
- No. of episodes: 25

Release
- Original network: CBS
- Original release: September 19, 2005 – May 22, 2006

Season chronology
- ← Previous; Season 3 Next → Season 5

The fourth season of CSI: Miami premiered on CBS on September 19, 2005 and ended May 22, 2006. The series stars David Caruso and Emily Procter.

== Description ==
With a mole in their midst, Horatio and Calleigh head a team of elite Crime Scene Investigators as they enter their most challenging season yet. Under the roof of a state-of-the-art redesigned crime lab, the dynamic duo investigate a series of crimes including a night-club murder, the death of a pool boy, a cold case rape, and a murder with a double-jeopardy clause, all whilst under the scrutiny of an anonymous mole, and facing a series of cases that threaten the team. With Alexx accused of murdering a child molester, Horatio accused of murdering an innocent woman, Wolfe facing the loss of his eye, and Mac Taylor joining the team when a prisoner transfer goes awry, it's ultimately Delko who faces the greatest loss: his sister who was to marry Horatio is gunned down by the Mala Noche gang in an attack that will begin a narrative recurring throughout the next several seasons.

== Cast ==
=== Main cast ===
- David Caruso as Horatio Caine; a CSI Lieutenant and the Director of the MDPD Crime Lab.
- Emily Procter as Calleigh Duquesne; a veteran CSI Detective, the CSI Assistant Supervisor and a ballistics expert.
- Adam Rodriguez as Eric Delko; a CSI Detective and Wolfe's partner.
- Khandi Alexander as Alexx Woods; a Medical Examiner assigned to CSI.
- Jonathan Togo as Ryan Wolfe; a newly hired CSI Detective and Delko's partner.

=== Recurring ===
- Rex Linn as Frank Tripp; a senior Robbery-Homicide Division (RHD) Detective assigned to assist the CSIs.
- Eva LaRue as Natalia Boa Vista; an undercover FBI Agent assigned to the team.
- Alana de la Garza as Marisol Delko-Caine; Horatio's wife and Delko's sister.
- Bellamy Young as Monica West; an Assistant States Attorney.
- Robert LaSardo as Memmo Fierro; a member of the Mala Noche.
- David Lee Smith as Rick Stetler; an IAB officer.

=== Guest stars ===
- Gary Sinise as Mac Taylor; the Director of the New York Crime Lab and an NYPD Detective.

== Episodes ==
No. overall	No. in season	Title	Directed by	Written by	Original release date	Prod. code	US viewers (millions)
73	1	"From the Grave"	Karen Gaviola	Ann Donahue & Elizabeth Devine	September 19, 2005	401	19.21
The team must find the connection between the two crime scenes: the killing of a drug dealer and the rape of an affluent family's housekeeper who happens to be pregnant.
74	2	"Blood in the Water"	Duane Clark	Dean Widenmann & Sunil Nayar	September 26, 2005	402	17.38
When a rich family is trapped on a burning yacht in shark-infested waters, the CSI's must investigate how it happened.
75	3	"Prey"	Scott Lautanen	Corey Miller & Barry O'Brien	October 3, 2005	403	18.67
The CSI's must investigate the dark side of Miami's nightclub scene when a teenage tourist goes missing. Sara Jennings was on her way to the Bahamas via Miami for a class trip when a wild night of partying, drinking and sex got out of control. Now, the CSI's must discover who she was with and what happened that night in order to find her. Meanwhile, Horatio's past in New York City resurfaces when an old unsolved case lands on his desk.
76	4	"48 Hours to Life"	Norberto Barba	John Haynes & Marc Dube	October 10, 2005	404	18.49
Horatio and the team are trying to figure out how to free an innocent young man after a harsh interrogation with Frank Tripp sends him to jail.
77	5	"Three-Way"	Jonathan Glassner	Marc Guggenheim & Ildy Modrovich	October 17, 2005	405	17.91
Three suburban housewives on a girls' weekend in Miami are the prime suspects when the hotel's handsome pool boy is found murdered. When Horatio is tipped off that his team is facing a surprise efficiency review, he must trust Calleigh, Eric, and Ryan to work together to find the killer. However, when they independently follow the evidence, each discovers that their analysis points to a different killer.
78	6	"Under Suspicion"	Sam Hill	Sunil Nayar & Barry O'Brien	October 24, 2005	406	19.94
The CSI's must race against time when all evidence in a murder case points to Horatio. When a murdered woman is discovered, Horatio admits that he was seeing her and that he was the last person to see her alive. Although the evidence logically points to Horatio as the killer, the CSI's must now dig deeper to find the real killer and learn who would have the motive and the method to frame him.
79	7	"Felony Flight"	Scott Lautanen	Elizabeth Devine & Anthony E. Zuiker & Ann Donahue	November 7, 2005	407	18.39
A convicted serial killer escapes after sabotaging an airplane that was flying him from New York to Miami, where he allegedly buried a body. After fleeing the crash site, the man goes on a killing spree and abducts a college student. Mac Taylor arrives in Miami to help Horatio and the team track the killer, since Mac originally arrested the man in New York. This episode begins a crossover with CSI: NY that concludes on "Manhattan Manhunt".
80	8	"Nailed"	Karen Gaviola	Corey Miller & Barry O'Brien	November 14, 2005	408	19.36
The CSIs are called out to investigate the murder of a young woman who was about to sign her divorce papers. Soon, the husband turns out to be the ideal suspect. The only strange thing about the case is the murder weapon: a nailgun. However, things become personal for the team when Ryan is attacked.
81	9	"Urban Hellraisers"	Matt Earl Beesley	Dean Widenmann & Marc Guggenheim	November 21, 2005	409	19.36
Eric finds himself in the middle of a robbery while at the bank. The team soon learns that the bank robbery is part of a video game called "Urban Hellraisers" being played out in real life. To stop them, Ryan must play the game and figure out the robbers' next move before another crime happens.
82	10	"Shattered"	Scott Lautanen	Ildy Modrovich	November 28, 2005	410	19.77
A drug lord is gunned in his Coconut Grove mansion and a suspect arrested at the scene claims he sells marijuana to Delko. Rick Stetler, from Internal Affairs, investigates and the case quickly becomes personal when Horatio gets involved. Calleigh makes a major decision concerning her job.
83	11	"Payback"	Sam Hill	Story by : Marc Dube & Ildy Modrovich & Marc Guggenheim; Teleplay by : Marc Dube	December 19, 2005	411	20.33
Horatio hunts for the man responsible for a brutal rape on a woman years earlier, after new DNA testing technology finds the convicted rapist innocent. Alexx and Eric investigate a doctor whose patient died from toxic shock after an appendectomy.
84	12	"The Score"	Jonathan Glassner	Barry O'Brien	January 9, 2006	412	20.15
The CSI's investigate the brutal murder of a man who was learning how to pick up women. Meanwhile, Horatio tries to help out Marisol, Delko's sister, who was arrested on drug charges.
85	13	"Silencer"	Ernest R. Dickerson	Sunil Nayar	January 23, 2006	413	19.69
The Mala Noche strike again and it's up to the CSI's to bring them down once and for all. Major secrets are revealed about the characters and their personal lives.
86	14	"Fade Out"	Scott Lautanen	Corey Miller	January 30, 2006	414	20.43
When evidence shows that a series of murders is linked to organized crime, Horatio and the team are instead lead to a pair of film students who possess a screenplay containing the details of the crimes. Meanwhile, Ryan learns that his eyesight is getting worse after he was attacked in "Nailed" and that his career as a CSI and at the crime lab might be jeopardized.
87	15	"Skeletons"	Karen Gaviola	John Haynes & Elizabeth Devine	February 6, 2006	415	18.68
When Horatio's nemesis, Walter Resden, targets someone from their past, Horatio tries to stop him. Delko's relationship with Natalia is tested when she thinks she may be pregnant.
88	16	"Deviant"	Scott Lautanen	Krystal Houghton	February 27, 2006	416	18.44
Alexx's DNA is found throughout her neighborhood where she is suspected to be responsible for the death of a convicted child molester. The CSI team soon learns that anyone in the neighborhood could have a motive to want the man gone. The team must find out who the real killer was to clear Alexx.
89	17	"Collision"	Sam Hill	Dean Widenmann	March 6, 2006	417	18.61
A horrible car accident that claims the life of a woman turns out to be a murder case. The evidence turns up more information and another body. During the investigation Natalia confesses a secret history of marital abuse in order to help the case to be solved.
90	18	"Double Jeopardy"	Scott Lautanen	Brian Davidson	March 13, 2006	418	19.01
The Miami-Dade district attorney loses a highly publicized murder trial in which a husband is accused of killing his young bride and then dumping her body in a lake. However, the woman's body is recovered after the trial concludes, and the 'double jeopardy' clause precludes the husband from being tried again. Now, as the CSI's fear that justice may not be served, new evidence suggests that the husband may have actually practiced on another victim first, and Horatio believes that CSI's may be able to get the husband retried under different grounds.
91	19	"Driven"	Eagle Egilsson	Ildy Modrovich	March 20, 2006	419	19.86
After a group of wealthy young women's cars are stolen from a luxury day spa, evidence leads the CSI's to believe that this is a part of a much larger car chopping scam and each of these women are being targeted for a home robbery. Matters become worse when Horatio discovers that Marisol was also at the spa during the robbery and he becomes protective of her, now that her life is threatened. Meanwhile, Ryan must deal with the consequences of freezing during a raid on the chopshop.
92	20	"Free Fall"	Scott Lautanen	Marc Dube	April 10, 2006	420	17.16
The CSI team must try to find out who is trying to kill a young couple (introduced in episode 86) who are released from prison. The couple, who become a Bonnie and Clyde type "media darlings" soon discover that not everyone regards them as such. Calleigh must work with an ex-friend to help solve the case.
93	21	"Dead Air"	Sam Hill	John Haynes	April 24, 2006	421	18.74
The CSI team must locate a woman who has been kidnapped and dialed a wrong number on her cell phone. To locate her, the team must first figure out who the kidnapped woman was trying to contact. Marisol has a difficult decision to make and Horatio helps her. Natalia is surprised when Ryan asks for Delko's permission to take her out on a date.
94	22	"Open Water"	Scott Lautanen	Marc Dube & Ildy Modrovich	May 1, 2006	422	19.31
A cruise ship docked in Miami is the scene of a double murder. The team investigates the long list of potential suspects and soon the list is dramatically shortened when the CSI's find a large amount of money missing from the victim's stateroom. Horatio and Marisol's relationship evolves further.
95	23	"Shock"	Karen Gaviola	Brian Davidson & Corey Miller	May 8, 2006	423	19.96
During an A-list house party, an heiress is found electrocuted in her own bathtub. The list of suspects includes her musician boyfriend, her assistant, and her main modelling rival. Delko learns that Horatio and Marisol are soon to be married and has mixed feelings about their wedding.
96	24	"Rampage"	Duane Clark	Ann Donahue & Sunil Nayar	May 15, 2006	424	17.50
The Mala Noche gang trial is stopped when the defendant escapes with the help of a fake witness and a gunman in the audience. Delko finds that a beautiful but disturbed ex-lover is stalking any woman who he is now close too, including his sister. When a hit is ordered by the Mala Noche gang on Horatio, Marisol is critically wounded by a sniper's bullet. When the gunman is found, Caine and Delko become justice-seeking vigilantes.
97	25	"One of Our Own"	Matt Earl Beesley	Story by : Elizabeth Devine; Teleplay by : Barry O'Brien & Krystal Houghton	May 22, 2006	425	19.96
Horatio and Delko search Miami to bring down the Mala Noche gang once and for all. After another Mala Noche related shooting, Officer Aaron Jessop is killed by a hand-grenade booby-trap at the crime-scene. The quest to end the crime-spree is jeopardized when Federal agents, led by Agent Glen Cole, raid the CSI lab searching for missing cash evidence, based on an unknown tip. Tensions rise as the source of the tip and the money thief are discovered. The eventual capture of gang leader Antonio Riaz brings additional problems after he strikes a plea bargain and is deported to Brazil, leaving Caine and Delko on a new mission to seek justice.
