= CSI: Miami season 3 =

Season of American television series CSI: Miami

CSI: Miami
- Season 3
- DVD cover
- Starring: David Caruso; Emily Procter; Adam Rodriguez; Sofia Milos; Khandi Alexander; Rory Cochrane; Jonathan Togo
- No. of episodes: 24

Release
- Original network: CBS
- Original release: September 20, 2004 – May 23, 2005

Season chronology
- ← Previous; Season 2 Next → Season 4

The third season of CSI: Miami premiered on CBS on September 20, 2004. The season finale aired on May 23, 2005. The series stars David Caruso and Emily Procter.

== Plot ==
Entering their third season, the Miami CSIs continue to work to rid the streets of crime using state-of-the-art scientific techniques and back-to-basics police work. The team suffers a personal loss this season as Tim Speedle is gunned down while investigating a murder/kidnapping. Horatio hires Ryan Wolfe, a patrol officer with Obsessive Compulsive tendencies, to round out their investigative squad. Facing their most explosive season yet, the team investigate piracy, car-jacking, gun-play, homicides involving snakes, and a tsunami.

== Cast ==
=== Changes ===
Rory Cochrane left the series after the season premiere. Jonathan Togo joined the show and was promoted to series regular. Rex Linn became a new recurring cast member.

=== Main cast ===
- David Caruso as Horatio Caine; a CSI Lieutenant and the Director of the MDPD Crime Lab.
- Emily Procter as Calleigh Duquesne; a veteran CSI Detective, the CSI Assistant Supervisor and a ballistics expert.
- Adam Rodriguez as Eric Delko; a CSI Detective and Wolfe's partner.
- Sofia Milos as Yelina Salas; an MDPD Robbery-Homicide Division (RHD) Detective assigned to assist the CSIs.
- Khandi Alexander as Alexx Woods; a Medical Examiner assigned to CSI.
- Rory Cochrane as Tim Speedle; a CSI Detective and Delko's partner. (Episode 1)
- Jonathan Togo as Ryan Wolfe; a newly hired CSI Detective and Delko's partner. (Episodes 3–24)

=== Recurring ===
- Rex Linn as Frank Tripp; a senior Robbery-Homicide Division (RHD) Detective assigned to assist the CSI's.
- Holt McCallany as John Hagen; a senior MDPD Robbery-Homicide Division (RHD) Detective assigned to assist the CSI's.
- David Lee Smith as Rick Stetler; an IAB officer.

== Episodes ==
Episodes 7 and 16 have a net running time of 63 minutes.

No. overall	No. in season	Title	Directed by	Written by	Original release date	Prod. code	US viewers (millions)
49	1	"Lost Son"	Duane Clark	Ann Donahue & Elizabeth Devine	September 20, 2004	301	22.46
A normal case which begins with the discovery of a businessman's bullet-ridden body aboard an empty yacht that smashed into a bridge has the team uncovering information that suggests that the dead man was delivering the ransom for his kidnapped son. The case soon takes a tragic turn when Speedle dies from injuries sustained in a shoot-out at a jewelry store, leaving the team devastated and more determined than ever to find out who is responsible.
50	2	"Pro Per"	Karen Gaviola	John Haynes & Steven Maeda	September 27, 2004	302	19.72
A woman is killed during a party at a Star Island estate when a man opens fire on the proceedings from a cigarette boat. When a former con is arrested, he acts as his own lawyer and proves to be smarter than he appears. Complicating matters is the fact that the leading witness in the case is the dead woman's young son, who Horatio wants to protect, refusing to let him testify. Guest starring Channing Tatum.
51	3	"Under the Influence"	Scott Lautanen	Marc Dube & Corey Miller	October 4, 2004	303	20.75
The CSIs must find the killer after a young woman is pushed in front of a moving bus. Alexx finds a bruise shaped like a hand imprint on the victim's back, proving that she was pushed in front of the bus, and her boyfriend, Jay Seaver, is the prime suspect. When one of Jay's office rivals also turns up dead, Jay reveals that he has a psychotic stalker, Claudia. Meanwhile, Calleigh's father seeks her help when he fears that he may have killed someone after a night of drinking, and Horatio assigns a new CSI, Ryan Wolfe, to the case much to Calleigh's dismay.
52	4	"Murder in a Flash"	Fred Keller	Anne McGrail & Sunil Nayar	October 11, 2004	304	21.94
E-mails and text messages trigger a mass gathering of students to perform a random task on a golf course. However, as the crowd disperses, the body of a high school student is found. The original message triggering the "flash mob" is traced to a high school senior whose father is a high-powered defense attorney. Meanwhile Horatio and Yelina investigate the death of a young meth addict found in a dumpster outside where she buys the drugs.
53	5	"Legal"	Duane Clark	Michael Ostrowski & Ildy Modrovich	October 18, 2004	305	19.81
An 18-year-old girl is stabbed to death in a bathroom of a popular Miami nightclub. Horatio learns that the victim, Jenny Price was an investigative aide working for Alcohol Beverage Control and was monitoring underage drinking. However, the case gets more complicated when they discover another murdered victim inside a nearby crashed car. Meanwhile, Calleigh and Ryan work together to determine whether an insecure and underage teenager at the club that night had anything to do with the murder.
54	6	"Hell Night"	Scott Lautanen	Steven Maeda & Corey Miller	October 25, 2004	306	21.91
The wife of a famous baseball player is brutally killed in her home and her philandering husband is charged with the crime. The jury on the case, as well as the accused and his defense, visits the house to examine the crime scene, but when the lights are dimmed, as they were when the victim was killed, and then turned back on, the ball player is found dead with a meat cleaver in his head and a note that reads "guilty." Meanwhile, Horatio gets a call from Yelina, who tells him that her son, Ray, Jr., is missing.
55	7	"Crime Wave"	Karen Gaviola	Elizabeth Devine	November 8, 2004	307	22.09
As a huge tsunami heads directly towards Miami, a ten-hour warning gives citizens just enough time to evacuate the city. In the chaos, two people are killed in a parking lot and the evidence leads Horatio to discover a plot to rob a bank timed to take advantage of the evacuation. In the wake of the storm, Ryan and Alexx discover a body washed up from a local cemetery, but discover 13 bodies yet only 12 were buried there. Meanwhile, Horatio suspects that Yelina is being physically abused by her boyfriend, IAB's Rick Stetler.
56	8	"Speed Kills"	Fred Keller	Sunil Nayar & Marc Dube	November 15, 2004	308	22.48
A murder investigation takes Horatio and the team into the world of speed dating. Richard Laken is found killed by a tire iron outside a lounge following an evening of speed dating. The team discovers his car is covered with acetone, which traces back to one of the female guests. Now, when Horatio and the team learn that Laken recently witnessed a serious assault at a Miami Heat basketball game, they are on the hunt for two perps instead of one.
57	9	"Pirated"	Duane Clark	Michael Ostrowski & Steven Maeda	November 22, 2004	309	22.12
The team investigates a modern-day piracy off the coast of Miami after six bodies are discovered floating in the ocean tied together by rope. Horatio suspects that a ship was hijacked with some of the crew killed and then dumped overboard. Evidence suggests that other crew members might have escaped on a life raft. Using radar and GPS technology, the CSIs find survivors but their stories don't match. Now, Horatio and the team must learn what really happened out in the ocean as they find themselves investigating the seamy underbelly of Miami's militias and arms dealers.
58	10	"After the Fall"	Scott Lautanen	Ildy Modrovich & Marc Dube	November 29, 2004	310	22.71
The CSIs must investigate when a pedestrian is killed after a man falls from a building and lands on him. Horatio and the team find that the victim found on the sidewalk is not the same man who fell from the building, but the unfortunate person he landed on. The CSIs discover that the fallen victim is in possession of a sex DVD involving a top Miami criminal judge and a woman with a sordid sex life. When the woman is found dead, the team must delve into the complicated personal lives of those in Miami's judicial system in order to find the killer.
59	11	"Addiction"	Steven DePaul	Charles Holland	December 13, 2004	311	20.54
When a woman (Holly Valance) is killed in what looks like a carjacking, the CSIs talk to her husband, the oldest of the three brothers who run their lucrative family business. However, when it is revealed that the victim had a gambling addiction that could have bankrupted the company, the team must follow the evidence to find the killer. Meanwhile, Alexx hires a recovering alcoholic as a body hauler and must investigate when he is accused of stealing from the dead.
60	12	"Shootout"	Norberto Barba	Corey Miller & Sunil Nayar	January 3, 2005	312	18.49
When gang-related gunplay goes down in an emergency room, Horatio and the team must find the gang members responsible. The evidence suggests that an orderly in the hospital recognized the wounded gang member, who possibly killed one of the orderly's friends and alerted gang members to his location. However, the evidence doesn't match up and the CSIs discover that a cheating girlfriend, not gang retaliation, may be behind the shooting. Meanwhile, Ryan questions a mother in the emergency room after her story regarding her child doesn't add up.
61	13	"Cop Killer"	Jonathan Glassner	Steven Maeda & Krystal Houghton	January 17, 2005	313	22.04
During a routine traffic stop, a police officer is murdered and now Horatio and the team must track down the killer. The only witness to the murder is a civilian who was doing a ride-along with the officer, and is now missing. Roadside evidence leads the CSIs to Missy Marshall, a teenage girl who was with the killer at the time of the murder. Also, Horatio and Rebecca's relationship is in jeopardy when they don't see eye to eye on a case.
62	14	"One Night Stand"	Greg Yaitanes	Michael Ostrowski & John Haynes	February 7, 2005	314	18.82
The CSIs uncover a complex counterfeiting operation after a bellboy is found murdered at one of Miami's hottest hotels. The luggage that the deceased bellboy had been loading, as well as a heist of a special paper that money is printed on, leads the CSIs to uncover a complex counterfeiting operation. It's cruise season in Miami, which means that the population of Miami swells, giving the team even more suspects to the murder. Meanwhile, Calleigh must investigate when a woman goes missing, and is later found dead, after she and her husband attend a hot and flirty "friction" party.
63	15	"Identity"	Gloria Muzio	Ann Donahue & Ildy Modrovich	February 14, 2005	315	19.35
When the CSIs find a woman swallowed whole and killed by a gigantic snake, they uncover a covert drug smuggling operation. Evidence leads Horatio and the team to a drug smuggling operation where large snakes are suspected of being used to bring illegal drugs into the country to avoid detection by customs. However, when Horatio finds that Clavo Cruz, a nemesis of Horatio's who hides behind his diplomatic immunity, may be behind the operation, the team must find a legal way to put the criminal behind bars. Meanwhile, Calleigh and Wolfe investigate when two women each claim that they are the real victim of identity theft and the other is the culprit.
64	16	"Nothing to Lose"	Karen Gaviola	Elizabeth Devine & Marc Dube	February 21, 2005	316	19.48
Evidence leads the CSIs to believe that someone started a massive fire in the Everglades in order to cover up a murder. Local prisoners are brought in as free manpower to help fight the wild fire in the Everglades. However, when a serial killer, Todd Kendrick (Jeffrey Donovan) escapes the scene, Horatio must track him down before he strikes again. But things go from bad to worse when Kendrick kidnaps Alexx and forces her to treat him at gunpoint, forcing Horatio to find her before it's too late. Meanwhile, the body of a local college student is found shot to death and the fire has destroyed the crime scene and the evidence. However, when the team uncovers an illegal moonshine operation and homemade ammunitions in the vicinity, the CSIs uncover the real reason why the boy was out there.
65	17	"Money Plane"	Scott Lautanen	Sunil Nayar & Steven Maeda	March 7, 2005	317	21.68
Someone uses a laser light to blind a pilot and bring down a jet, which carries $1.2 billion in checks to be delivered to banks on the eastern seaboard. The crime scene evidence reveals a victim, a young fundraising socialite, who was inside the plane but killed prior to the crash. Now, although the team has little to work with since the victim's wealthy family is opposing an autopsy, Horatio must follow the money trail. Meanwhile, Calleigh works on the case with her ex-boyfriend, Detective Hagen, and their romantic history could cause problems for both of them.
66	18	"Game Over"	Jonathan Glassner	Michael Ostrowski & Corey Miller	March 21, 2005	318	18.93
An extreme skateboarder and videogame tester (played by Tony Hawk) is found dead on a half-pipe platform used to program extreme skateboarding video games. The CSIs discover that he was wearing reflective sensors when he was killed, so the motion-capture device used to produce these videogames recorded the murder as it happened, but not the murderer. Now the team delves into the highly competitive world of videogame programmers and testers to find the killer. Meanwhile Horatio helps out an old friend of Speedle's, when a sex tape featuring her is stolen.
67	19	"Sex & Taxes"	Scott Shiffman	Ildy Modrovich & Brian Davidson	April 11, 2005	319	20.67
An IRS agent is killed while trying to repossess a delinquent taxpayer's yacht. Soon after, the CSIs discover a second IRS agent shot to death. Now, just when everyone has a reason to detest the IRS, Horatio must find who is behind what could possibly be a series of murders right before tax day.
68	20	"Killer Date"	Karen Gaviola	Elizabeth Devine & John Haynes	April 18, 2005	320	20.11
Horatio's life is changed forever when he learns important information about his deceased brother. Horatio must now figure out what to do with this information about his brother, Raymond, and whether or not to tell Yelina. Meanwhile, the team investigates when a woman is murdered at a crowded bar after she's approached by a female employee of a service that helps men pick-up women. Also, when Delko loses his badge after some reckless behavior and it's used in a crime, he must locate the badge before it's used again.
69	21	"Recoil"	Joe Chappelle	Steven Maeda & Marc Dube	May 2, 2005	321	20.70
After a bitter custody battle, shots are fired outside the courthouse. Bullets fly and the target is the little girl's mother. Horatio goes after the father, who he suspects may not be the girl's biological father after all. However, when the mother's shady past is uncovered, the team finds that she has a lot of enemies who would like to take a shot at her. Meanwhile, Delko investigates when a man falls from a 16-story building.
70	22	"Vengeance"	Norberto Barba	Corey Miller & Sunil Nayar	May 9, 2005	322	20.02
When a former high school football star is murdered at a reunion, the CSIs must find the killer. The victim was the big man on campus in high school and there are a lot of guests at the reunion with reasons to resent him all these years. Now, the team must investigate everyone, from the head cheerleader to the school misfit, to see who held a decade-old grudge big enough to kill. Meanwhile, Horatio and Delko arrive at a crime scene and discover that it's already been processed, leading Horatio to uncover further information about his brother possibly being alive.
71	23	"Whacked"	Scott Lautanen	Ann Donahue & Elizabeth Devine	May 16, 2005	323	22.98
An axe murderer on death row is given a stay of execution just moments before it was to take place, on the grounds that there may have been tainted DNA analysis used at his trial. Now, without using any DNA evidence, the team must race against time and reexamine all of the physical evidence in the case, just as they get a call on a new double murder that looks suspiciously like the case they're working on.
72	24	"10-7"	Joe Chappelle	Story by : Michael Ostrowski; Teleplay by : Ann Donahue & Elizabeth Devine	May 23, 2005	324	21.22
While investigating the murder of man hired to make dirty bombs that terrorists intend to set off in Miami, Horatio finds the bloody fingerprint of his brother, Raymond, whom he believed to be dead. However, when Raymond's son is kidnapped, he emerges from deep undercover and the estranged brothers must work together to save the boy. Meanwhile, while processing a crime scene, an unknown assailant holds a gun to Calleigh's head and, after a deadly confrontation in her ballistics lab, she is left doubting that she can continue as a CSI.
