= CSI: Miami season 2 =

Season of American television series CSI: Miami

CSI: Miami
- Season 2
- DVD cover
- Starring: David Caruso; Emily Procter; Adam Rodriguez; Khandi Alexander; Rory Cochrane
- No. of episodes: 24

Release
- Original network: CBS
- Original release: September 22, 2003 – May 24, 2004

Season chronology
- ← Previous; Season 1 Next → Season 3

The second season of CSI: Miami premiered on CBS on September 22, 2003, and ended May 24, 2004. The series stars David Caruso and Emily Procter.

== Cast ==
=== Starring ===
- David Caruso as Horatio Caine; an MDPD CSI Lieutenant, CSI Day Shift Supervisor, and the head of the Miami Dade Crime Lab. He is Calleigh's partner.
- Emily Procter as Calleigh Duquesne; an MDPD CSI Detective, ballistics analyst, and the Day Shift Assistant Supervisor; a role she inherited from Megan Donner during season 1. She is Horatio's partner.
- Adam Rodriguez as Eric Delko; an MDPD CSI Detective, underwater recovery expert, tire-tread analyst, and CSI Level III. He is Speedle's partner.
- Khandi Alexander as Alexx Woods; the MDPD's Medical Examiner.
- Rory Cochrane as Tim Speedle; an MDPD CSI Detective, trace and fiber analyst, and CSI Level III. He is Delko's partner.

=== Recurring cast ===
- Sofia Milos as Yelina Salas; Horatio's sister-in-law and a senior Robbery-Homicide Division (RHD) Detective assigned to assist the CSI's.
- Rex Linn as Frank Tripp; a senior Robbery-Homicide Division (RHD) Detective assigned to assist the CSI's.
- Holt McCallany as John Hagen; a senior Robbery-Homicide Division (RHD) Detective assigned to assist the CSI's.
- David Lee Smith as Rick Stetler; an IAB officer.

=== Guest stars ===
- Gary Sinise as Mac Taylor; a Detective First Grade and the Director of the NYPD Crime Lab.
- Melina Kanakaredes as Stella Bonasera; a Detective First Grade and NYPD CSI Assistant Supervisor.
- Carmine Giovinazzo as Danny Messer; a Detective Third Grade and NYPD CSI Level 3.
- Vanessa Ferlito as Aiden Burn; a Detective Third Grade and NYPD CSI Level 2.
- Hill Harper as Sheldon Hawkes; the New York Medical Examiner.

== Episodes ==
| No. overall | No. in season | Title | Directed by | Written by | Original release date | Prod. code | US viewers (millions) |
|---|---|---|---|---|---|---|---|
| 25 | 1 | "Blood Brothers" | Danny Cannon | Ann Donahue | September 22, 2003 | 201 | 17.40 |
Horatio investigates the murder of a model intentionally run down outside of a Miami hotel by a driver who fled the scene. When the evidence leads to a suspect, governmental red tape puts an unexpected twist on the proceedings. Horatio and Yelina begin to confront their feelings for one another.
| 26 | 2 | "Dead Zone" | Joe Chappelle | Michael Ostrowski | September 29, 2003 | 202 | 17.33 |
The body of a man involved in recovering sunken treasure is discovered pinned to the wall of his new cabin cruiser by a bloody spear fired from a speargun at close range.
| 27 | 3 | "Hard Time" | David Grossman | Steven Maeda | October 6, 2003 | 204 | 18.13 |
Horatio hunts for the person responsible for a vicious attack on a woman who was lured to a vacant condo and beaten with a piece of lumber.
| 28 | 4 | "Death Grip" | Deran Sarafian | Elizabeth Devine | October 13, 2003 | 203 | 17.64 |
When a teen tennis phenom is abducted from her bedroom, the investigation leads to the waterways when a girl's arm is recovered in the belly of an alligator. Delko calls for an expert—his old college buddy and now alligator expert Jeff Corwin to assist.
| 29 | 5 | "The Best Defense" | Scott Lautanen | Shane Brennan | October 20, 2003 | 205 | 17.55 |
The two young owners of a city bar are gunned down after hours and another man is wounded in the attack, which was allegedly committed by a masked gunman. Meanwhile, Calleigh's dad announces he is now a public defender and needs her help with a murder case in which a woman allegedly stabbed her boyfriend to death in his car with a screwdriver.
| 30 | 6 | "Hurricane Anthony" | Joe Chappelle | Ildy Modrovich & Laurence Walsh | November 3, 2003 | 206 | 19.52 |
Hurricane Anthony strikes Miami. A man and his wife are trying to drive out of the storm's fury when they strike and kill a man in the blinding storm. Horatio finds that the lack of impact wounds on the victim's knees suggest that he struck the car as opposed to the car striking him. In a seemingly unrelated case, Horatio finds another victim of the hurricane impaled on a fence. However, as the CSIs uncover the scattered remains of the post-storm evidence, it seems that these two cases may have a deadly connection. Meanwhile, after Calleigh witnesses a man looting a house, she realizes that she's got another case on her hands when she finds his ex-wife inside shot to death.
| 31 | 7 | "Grand Prix" | David Grossman | Michael Ostrowski & Steven Maeda | November 10, 2003 | 207 | 18.44 |
A member of a Champ Car pit crew is engulfed in invisible flames and dies during a qualifying race at the Grand Prix Americas.
| 32 | 8 | "Big Brother" | Joe Chappelle | Ann Donahue & Jonathan Glassner | November 17, 2003 | 208 | 18.87 |
Horatio is driven to find his brother's killer and protect the niece he never knew existed when Susie, an ex-meth user, shows up with Ray's illegitimate daughter. The team explores a voyeuristic Internet site in connection with a stockbroker's murder.
| 33 | 9 | "Bait" | Deran Sarafian | Steven Maeda & Shane Brennan | November 24, 2003 | 209 | 19.73 |
A young woman is attacked by a shark and later dies, but it is discovered that she was shot first. The case becomes even more difficult for the CSIs when one of their coworkers becomes a leading suspect. The dead woman worked for a private-investigation agency that specializes in luring and entrapping married men suspected of infidelity.
| 34 | 10 | "Extreme" | Karen Gaviola | Elizabeth Devine & John Haynes | December 15, 2003 | 210 | 19.21 |
A young woman is thrown over the railing of a parking garage, but the investigation into her death uncovers evidence that she was killed before the fall and had likely been kidnapped. The victim's watch is traced to her boyfriend, who tells the detectives that she was a thrill seeker who was abducted during the course of an extreme kind of role-playing game. Meanwhile, Delko gets into trouble when he inadvertently interferes with a case after stumbling across a car-theft ring. Guest starring Chris Pine.
| 35 | 11 | "Complications" | Scott Lautanen | Sunil Nayar & Corey Miller | January 5, 2004 | 211 | 20.40 |
An anesthesiologist who worked in a beauty clinic is discovered swinging from a rope in his two-story condo, but the investigation points to murder, not suicide. The case intensifies when it is learned that the doctor lost a patient the week before during routine plastic surgery and that the victim's husband believes she was killed.
| 36 | 12 | "Witness to Murder" | Duane Clark | Story by : Michael Ostrowski; Teleplay by : Ildy Modrovich & Laurence Walsh | January 12, 2004 | 212 | 19.73 |
A diamond broker carrying two million dollars in merchandise is murdered after his car is hit by another vehicle and he gets out to confront the driver. The only witness to the crime is a developmentally challenged man who says the killer is someone named Colton. Meanwhile, outside of town, Speedle and Delko investigate the death of a teenage girl discovered at a rest stop with a broken neck. Shortly after the victim is taken from the scene, her body disappears during transport to Miami.
| 37 | 13 | "Blood Moon" | Scott Lautanen | Jonathan Glassner & Marc Dube | February 2, 2004 | 213 | 20.60 |
A cigar maker is found in his store tied up, beaten, mutilated, and murdered with a chaveta, a cigar-making tool featuring a rounded blade. The investigation leads Horatio to a group that helps Cuban refugees. Across town, a 25-year-old man is gunned down while withdrawing money from an ATM, but the motive doesn't appear to be robbery since the cash he withdrew is left behind.
| 38 | 14 | "Slow Burn" | Joe Chappelle | Shane Brennan & Michael Ostrowski | February 9, 2004 | 216 | 21.76 |
Delko and Alexx are nearly burned alive when they investigate the death of a hunter found shot near a supposedly controlled burn in the Everglades. The fire suddenly rages out of control and traps them, forcing them to take refuge under a tarpaulin. Later, a second body is discovered, and this time it is a young woman who looks to have been beaten to death. Horatio is led to believe a sex offender is behind the attack—and the fire.
| 39 | 15 | "Stalkerazzi" | Deran Sarafian | Elizabeth Devine & Steven Maeda | February 16, 2004 | 214 | 19.63 |
A celebrity photographer is found dead in his car following an accident, but Horatio believes he was murdered. The investigation leads to an A-list movie star who was caught in a compromising position in photos taken by the paparazzo. Guest starring Adam Scott.
| 40 | 16 | "Invasion" | Félix Enríquez Alcalá | Brian Davidson & Jonathan Glassner | February 23, 2004 | 215 | 20.34 |
When a former surf champion is murdered in his home, the CSIs are determined to find the killer. Ted Henderson is killed in his own home and his body is missing, while his wife and son are left beaten and bound. While searching the home, Horatio finds heroin in the son's room and learns that he is secretly a drug dealer.
| 41 | 17 | "Money for Nothing" | Karen Gaviola | Marc Dube | March 1, 2004 | 217 | 19.90 |
Horatio is quick on the scene when an armored truck carrying $3.2 million is robbed in a daring downtown heist. During the holdup, the driver is killed and Horatio guns down one of the two thieves. The other escapes with the loot, but the money turns out to be counterfeit. The team must figure out what happened to the bank's money before it was replaced with fake bills. Making the day even worse for Horatio, Yelina spies him with his niece and assumes the girl is his illegitimate child, not her own late husband's daughter.
| 42 | 18 | "Wannabe" | Fred Keller | Story by : John Haynes; Teleplay by : Elizabeth Devine & Steven Maeda | March 22, 2004 | 218 | 20.33 |
Horatio and Speedle's case hinges on the testimony of a forensic-evidence enthusiast who stole a blood-drenched latex glove from the scene of the murder of a man who was stabbed to death with a butterfly knife. When Speedle tracks him down, the CSI wannabe is impressed by the ease with which Speedle was able to locate him, and the two begin to bond. Meanwhile, Delko and Calleigh probe the shooting death of a young woman whose body is found wrapped in a plastic garbage bag in a dumpster near the ritzy Miami club where she worked.
| 43 | 19 | "Deadline" | Deran Sarafian | Story by : Sunil Nayar; Teleplay by : Ildy Modrovich & Laurence Walsh | March 29, 2004 | 219 | 19.68 |
Josh Dalton, a hot, young reporter for the Miami Sun, witnesses the murder of his friend, a city councilman's aide, in Miami's drug district, the Golden Triangle. Josh, who was suspiciously unharmed in the attack, claims that they were only down there on a story, but Horatio believes that there's more to the situation. Later, another writer from the same paper is found shot to death inside the trunk of her car, which was reported stolen. Now, as the evidence rejects Josh's version of what happened, the CSIs find themselves entangled in the world of fast-paced journalism and learn that there is a dangerously fine line between the truth and what sells newspapers.
| 44 | 20 | "The Oath" | Duane Clark | Alison Lea Bingeman | April 19, 2004 | 220 | 21.02 |
A police officer collapses and dies after pulling over a car, and the investigation reveals he was murdered. Horatio grows suspicious when Internal Affairs gets involved in the case, leading him to believe that the killing wasn't a random crime. Meanwhile, Calleigh aids an abused woman who is living with one of the suspects in the probe. Yelina begins dating Horatio's nemesis—who is heading up the Internal Affairs inquiry.
| 45 | 21 | "Not Landing" | Joe Chappelle | Story by : Jonathan Glassner; Teleplay by : Shane Brennan & Marc Dube | May 3, 2004 | 221 | 17.62 |
After a small plane crashes at a Miami beach and the pilot dies, Horatio finds remnants at the crash site of chemical used in making cocaine, and it seems that the victim's business partner may have sabotaged the aircraft. However, when evidence suggests that the pilot may have died before the crash, the team investigates the victim's neighbors—all wealthy residents of a secluded cul-de-sac where lust, jealousy and greed are dangerous motives for murder.
| 46 | 22 | "Rap Sheet" | David Grossman | Ildy Modrovich & Corey Miller | May 10, 2004 | 222 | 20.94 |
A security guard is found dead after shots ring out at a rap star's concert and the CSIs must investigate. Rap star 10-Large (played by Xzibit) won't talk to the police regarding the murder or why someone would try to kill him. But when evidence suggests that perhaps 10-Large's bodyguard was the intended target, the CSIs must look into the dangerous world of personal security. Meanwhile, Alexx gets the shock of her life when a supposed cadaver from a recent car accident wakes up in her morgue, suffering only from hypothermia.
| 47 | 23 | "MIA/NYC NonStop" | Danny Cannon | Anthony E. Zuiker & Ann Donahue & Carol Mendelsohn | May 17, 2004 | 223 | 23.08 |
When a teenage girl returns home from a big party night at an underage nightclub to find her parents murdered, the search for the killer leads Horatio to New York City. Before he arrives, the New York detectives, led by Detective Mac Taylor, are called out to investigate the shooting of an undercover police officer—who, it turns out, is the lead suspect in the Miami case. However, the medical examiner determines that he has been dead for 72 hours and could not even have been alive at the time of the double-murder in Miami. After further investigation, Horatio and Mac determine that the real killer murdered the New York cop, then used his ID to get to Miami, and is still on the loose. This was the pilot episode for CSI: NY.
| 48 | 24 | "Innocent" | Joe Chappelle | Story by : John Haynes; Teleplay by : Steven Maeda & Sunil Nayar | May 24, 2004 | 224 | 21.30 |
An adult film actress is found strangled in the park and the CSIs must find the killer. Blood and human tissue are found under Ashley Anders' nails and the DNA matches that of the CEO of the company that distributes her films—and he is a registered sex offender. Also, Calleigh discovers his answering machine audiotape on which he makes a threat against Ashley. However, there is an accident back at the lab with this crucial piece of evidence and Delko was the last person to handle it. Now, IAB's Rick Stetler is put on the case, much to Horatio's dismay, as the CSIs try to uncover further evidence in order to find the girl's killer.
