= List of CSI: Miami characters =

Fictional characters on American television series CSI: Miami

The following is a list of characters from the CBS crime drama television series, CSI: Miami. It follows Miami criminalists (identified as "the Crime Scene Investigators") working for the Miami-Dade Police Department (MDPD) as they use physical evidence to solve murders.

== Equations ==
During CSI: Miami's opening credits, several actors' names morph in and out of equations.

Actor	Equation
David Caruso	4y−1=3b[Nh]
Kim Delaney	A1b+B2c=R4
Emily Procter	3a1−X=[A9Xy]
with	^*[°
Adam Rodriguez	3b+N=7bn1[6A]
Khandi Alexander	2b+4a=[7h]3XyNh
Rory Cochrane	[3h]+[7b]=6m
Sofia Milos	—N/a
Jonathan Togo	[7b]=6m+[3h]
Rex Linn	—N/a
Eva LaRue	—N/a
Omar Miller	—N/a
Megalyn Echikunwoke	—N/a
and	¤[°E
Eddie Cibrian	2b+4a=[7h]3

== Notable cast members ==
Key
Main	Series Crossover	Special Appearance	Recurring

CSI: Miami ran for ten seasons between 2002 and 2012, and featured a cast of thirteen regulars. David Caruso, as Lieutenant Horatio Caine, was afforded the starring credit, while Emily Procter was credited second to him. Kim Delaney, the female lead in the episodes she appeared, was credited as and, while Rory Cochrane was afforded this credit following his departure, despite being previously credited as with. Also holding and positions were Adam Rodriguez, during seasons 9 and 10 (he was previously credited directly following Procter), and Eddie Cibrian during season 8. Sofia Milos (season 3), Khandi Alexander (seasons 1–6), Jonathan Togo (seasons 3–10), Rex Linn (seasons 5–10), Eva LaRue (seasons 5–10), Megalyn Echikunwoke (season 7), and Omar Benson Miller (seasons 8–10) were credited consistently in that order.

Actor	Character	Occupation	First Episode (credited as regular)	Final Episode (credited as regular)	Seasons									
Actor	Character	Occupation	First Episode (credited as regular)	Final Episode (credited as regular)	1	2	3	4	5	6	7	8	9	10
David Caruso	Horatio Caine	Criminalistics Director; CSI Level III Supervisor; Lieutenant	"Golden Parachute" (S1E01)	"Habeas Corpse" (S10E19)	Main	Main	Main	Main	Main	Main	Main	Main	Main	Main
Emily Procter	Calleigh Duquesne	CSI Level III; Assistant Supervisor; Detective	"Golden Parachute" (S1E01)	"Habeas Corpse" (S10E19)	Main	Main	Main	Main	Main	Main	Main	Main	Main	Main
Adam Rodriguez	Eric Delko	CSI Level III; Detective	"Golden Parachute" (S1E01)	"Habeas Corpse" (S10E19)	Main (Note: Main in episodes 1-5 & recurring in episodes 11, 14, 16, 21-24 of season 8)	Main	Main	Main	Main	Main	Main	Main	Main	Main
Khandi Alexander	Alexx Woods	Medical Examiner	"Golden Parachute" (S1E01)	"Rock and a Hard Place" (S6E19)	Main (Note: Main from season 1 to episodes season 19 of season 6.)	Main	Main	Main	Main	Main				
Rory Cochrane	Tim Speedle	CSI Level III; Detective	"Golden Parachute" (S1E01)	"Lost Son" (S3E01)	Main (Note: Main from season 1 to episode 1 of season 3.)	Main	Main							
Kim Delaney	Megan Donner	CSI Level III; Assistant Supervisor; Lieutenant	"Golden Parachute" (S1E01)	"A Horrible Mind" (S1E10)	(Note: Episodes 1-10)									
Sofia Milos	Yelina Salas	Robbery-Homicide Division Detective	"Lost Son" (S3E01)	"10-7" (S3E24)					Recurring	Recurring	Recurring			
Jonathan Togo	Ryan Wolfe	CSI Level III; Detective	"Under the Influence" (S3E03)	"Habeas Corpse" (S10E19)			Main (Note: Recurring in episodes 3–5 of season 3, main from episode 6 onwards.)	Main	Main	Main	Main	Main	Main	Main
Rex Linn	Frank Tripp	Robbery-Homicide Division Sergeant	"Rio" (S5E01)	"Habeas Corpse" (S10E19)	Recurring	Recurring	Recurring	Recurring	Main	Main	Main	Main	Main	Main
Eva LaRue	Natalia Boa Vista	CSI Level II	"Rio" (S5E01)	"Habeas Corpse" (S10E19)					Main	Main	Main	Main	Main	Main
Megalyn Echikunwoke	Tara Price	Assistant Medical Examiner	"Won't Get Fueled Again" (S7E03)	"Dissolved" (S7E24)							(Note: Episodes 3-24.)			
Eddie Cibrian	Jesse Cardoza	CSI Level II; Detective	"Out of Time" (S8E01)	"All Fall Down" (S8E24)										
Omar Benson Miller	Walter Simmons	CSI Level II; Detective	"Bolt Action" (S8E03)	"Habeas Corpse" (S10E19)								Main (Note: Recurring in episodes 3–5 of season 8, main from episode 6 onwards.)	Main	Main

== Crossover characters ==
Key
Starring	Series Crossover	Special Appearance	Guest Starring

CSI: Miami hosted several crossover episodes during its ten seasons on air. Gary Sinise, as Detective Mac Taylor, and Melina Kanakaredes as his partner, Detective Stella Bonasera, were introduced during a 2004 episode of CSI: Miami, as were the rest of the CSI: NY cast. Sinise reprised his role during Miami's fourth season, while CSI: Crime Scene Investigation alumnus Laurence Fishburne appeared as his established character during part one of a three part CSI: Trilogy event. All of the actors listed below were credited as special guest stars.

Actor	Character	First Episode (credited as special guest)	Final Episode (credited as special guest)	Seasons									
Actor	Character	First Episode (credited as special guest)	Final Episode (credited as special guest)	1	2	3	4	5	6	7	8	9	10
Gary Sinise	NYPD CSI; Detective First Grade; Mac Taylor	"MIA/NYC Nonstop" (02x23)	"Felony Flight" (04x07)										
Melina Kanakaredes	NYPD CSI; Detective First Grade; Stella Bonasera	"MIA/NYC Nonstop" (02x23)	"MIA/NYC Nonstop" (02x23)										
Carmine Giovinazzo	NYPD CSI; Detective Third Grade; Danny Messer	"MIA/NYC Nonstop" (02x23)	"MIA/NYC Nonstop" (02x23)										
Vanessa Ferlito	NYPD CSI; Detective Third Grade; Aiden Burn	"MIA/NYC Nonstop" (02x23)	"MIA/NYC Nonstop" (02x23)										
Hill Harper	OCME Medical Examiner; Sheldon Hawkes	"MIA/NYC Nonstop" (02x23)	"MIA/NYC Nonstop" (02x23)										
Laurence Fishburne	LVPD CSI; Dr. Ray Langston	"Bone Voyage" (08x07)	"Bone Voyage" (08x07)										

In addition to appearing on CSI: Miami, several regular and recurring cast members have made appearances on both CSI: Crime Scene Investigation and CSI: NY. David Caruso, and Emily Procter, along with the rest of the original Miami cast (with the exception of Kim Delaney) were introduced during a 2002 episode of CSI: Crime Scene Investigation; Caruso later crossed over to CSI: NY.

Actor	Character	First Episode (CSI: Crime Scene Investigation)	Final Episode (CSI: Crime Scene Investigation)	CSI: Crime Scene Investigation															
Actor	Character	First Episode (CSI: Crime Scene Investigation)	Final Episode (CSI: Crime Scene Investigation)	1	2	3	4	5	6	7	8	9	10	11	12	13	14	15	16
Emily Procter	CSI Detective; Calleigh Duquesne	"Cross Jurisdictions" (02x22)	"Cross Jurisdictions" (02x22)																
David Caruso	CSI Lieutenant; Horatio Caine	"Cross Jurisdictions" (02x22)	"Cross Jurisdictions" (02x22)																
Tom Hillmann	FBI Special Agent; Dennis Sackheim	"Cross Jurisdictions" (02x22)	"Cross Jurisdictions" (02x22)																
Rory Cochrane	CSI Detective; Tim Speedle	"Cross Jurisdictions" (02x22)	"Cross Jurisdictions" (02x22)																
Khandi Alexander	Medical Examiner; Alexx Woods	"Cross Jurisdictions" (02x22)	"Cross Jurisdictions" (02x22)																
Adam Rodriguez	CSI Detective; Eric Delko	"Cross Jurisdictions" (02x22)	"Cross Jurisdictions" (02x22)																
Actor	Character	First Episode (CSI: NY)	Final Episode (CSI: NY)	CSI: NY															
Actor	Character	First Episode (CSI: NY)	Final Episode (CSI: NY)	X	X	X	X	1	2	3	4	5	6	7	8	9	X	X	X
David Caruso	CSI Lieutenant; Horatio Caine	"Manhattan Manhunt" (02x07)	"Manhattan Manhunt" (02x07)	—N/a	—N/a	—N/a	—N/a										—N/a	—N/a	—N/a

== Special guest stars ==
Actors who would later join the main cast, as well as returning former cast members, were often credited as special guest stars. Rex Linn (seasons 1–4), Sofia Milos (seasons 1–2, 5–7), Eva LaRue (season 4), Rory Cochrane (season 6), Khandi Alexander (seasons 7–8), and Adam Rodriguez (season 8), were among the performers afforded this credit, along with major recurring player Taylor Cole (season 10), and high-caliber guest performers such as Malcolm McDowell (seasons 8 and 10). This is not an extensive list, and as such, single-episode special guest appearances are not listed.

Actor	Character	First Episode (credited as special guest)	Final Episode (credited as special guest)	Seasons									
Actor	Character	First Episode (credited as special guest)	Final Episode (credited as special guest)	1	2	3	4	5	6	7	8	9	10
Rex Linn	Sergeant Detective; Frank Tripp	"Evidence of Things Unseen" (01x16)	"One of Our Own" (04x25)										
Sofia Milos	Detective; Yelina Salas	"Simple Man" (01x17)	"Seeing Red" (07x25)										
Eva LaRue	CSI Detective; Natalia Boa Vista	"From the Grave" (04x01)	"One of Our Own" (04x25)										
Rory Cochrane	CSI Detective; Tim Speedle	"Bang, Bang, Your Debt" (06x04)	"Bang, Bang, Your Debt" (06x04)										
Khandi Alexander	Medical Examiner; Alexx Woods	"Smoke Gets In Your CSIs" (07x14)	"Bad Seed" (08x05)										
Adam Rodriguez	CSI Detective; Eric Delko	"Delko for the Defense" (08x11)	"All Fall Down" (08x24)										
Malcolm McDowell	Defense Attorney; Darren Vogel	"L.A." (08x16)	"Habeas Corpse" (10x19)										
Eddie Cibrian	CSI Detective; Jesse Cardoza	"Fallen" (09x01)	"Fallen" (09x01)										
Taylor Cole	CSI Detective; Samantha Owens	"Sinner Takes All" (10x07)	"Habeas Corpse" (10x19)										

== Recurring cast ==
CSI: Miami hosted an extensive recurring cast throughout its ten seasons, consisting of law enforcement officials, family members, litigators, and fugitives. Law & Order: Los Angeles alums Wanda de Jesus and Alana de la Garza, 24's Carlos Bernard, Boston Legal actor Christian Clemenson and Rizzoli & Isles' Ed Begley, Jr. are among the most notable of those listed below.

=== Crime lab personnel ===
- Laboratory Technician Sam Belmontes (Cristian de la Fuente, seasons 1–2, 10): Chemical Analysis lab tech.
- Laboratory Technician Tyler Jenson (Brian Poth, seasons 1–3): Audio/visual and multimedia lab technician who was later replaced by Dan Cooper.
- Laboratory Technician Cynthia Wells (Brooke Bloom, seasons 2–5, 8–10): Questioned Documents lab tech.
- Laboratory Technician Carrie Delgado (Nicole DeHuff, season 2): Blood evidence technician. She was a fan of Quincy, M.E. as a child, influencing her to become a criminalist. She only appeared in season 2, as two years later, DeHuff died from pneumonia.
- Laboratory Technician Joseph Kayle (Leslie Odom Jr., seasons 2–4): A lab tech who worked in fingerprints.
- Laboratory Technician Maxine Valera (Boti Bliss, seasons 2–8): DNA analyst. She was temporarily suspended from her duties in season 3 for technical errors and was then reinstated by season 4. She has an unfortunate habit of taking shortcuts with evidence, which caused her suspension and also brought her under suspicion when the lab was investigated by the FBI (episode 4.25, "One of Our Own"). She goes on a date with Natalia Boa Vista's ex-husband, Nick Townsend, and thinks she is his killer after he turns up murdered, though this assumption is proved to be untrue. Jake Berkley (who investigated the case) kept insisting she and Natalia had killed him, despite the fact that Townsend was brutally beaten to death. She and Natalia were cleared, however, when it is revealed that Nick Townsend's death is related to the case of Lauren Sloan and her husband Jeff Murdock. Jeff killed Nick to get back his wife's earring (episode 5.12, "Internal Affairs"). Her final appearance was in "Delko for the Defense".
- Laboratory Technician Aaron Peters (Armando Valdes-Kennedy, seasons 3–4): A trace evidence lab tech. He did not like Eric Delko in his lab while working his sister's case being in his lab. He filed a report, but later regretted it when the lab falls under federal investigation. Presumably, as a result of the intense pressure the FBI was giving the Crime Lab, Peters most likely quit his job or at his own request was transferred to work elsewhere.
- Laboratory Technician Nicole Talcott (Kimiko Gelman, season 3): A lab tech from the night shift of the Miami Dade Crime Lab. She temporarily filled in for Valera after the latter was suspended for putting a rape victim's DNA and profile into the system.
- Laboratory Technician Daniel "Dan" Cooper (Brendan Fehr, seasons 4–6): He believes a great deal of information can be discerned by what music a person has on his or her MP3 playlist (episode 5.17, "A Grizzly Murder"). He had a good relationship with the Crime Lab personnel and also the CSIs until the season 6 episode "Bang, Bang, Your Debt", when he is discovered to have stolen and used a credit card that belonged to the late Tim Speedle—to the outrage of Delko and Calleigh, who told him to turn himself in or she would issue a warrant for his arrest. Presumably, this instance of identity theft was the final nail in the coffin for Cooper and ended his career at the lab, prompting him to resign from the lab for good, in disgrace. As a result, he holds a personal grudge against Calleigh for this, despite the fact that she does not press charges, and steals the flashcard out of her camera at a crime scene to put the pictures on a website he has created to "take her down a notch." He also changes her cell number and posts it on the site, and she is kidnapped from a "lead" (episode 6.16, "All In"). After an enraged Delko confronts him, Cooper later feels remorseful and turns in evidence that helps the team track down Calleigh, free her, and arrest her kidnappers.
- Laboratory Technician Jim Markham (Joshua Leonard, season 4), Ballistic lab tech. Markham became the head of the ballistics section when Calleigh left after John Hagan committed suicide there, but unfortunately, Markham made regular mistakes such as leaving skin cells unexamined on a bullet casing. Calleigh later grew tired of Markham screwing up and returned to the Ballistics lab, which also resulted in Markham being transferred elsewhere.
- Laboratory Technician Dave Benton (Wes Ramsey, seasons 7–10): Audio/visual tech for the Miami Dade Crime Lab, who is a rock-star type of guy. (Ramsey had previously appeared as Kip Martin in the season 1 episode, "Spring Break".)
- Laboratory Technician Michael Travers (Christopher Redman, seasons 7–10): British trace analyst. He has a background knowledge about horse racing which was helpful for a case (7.13, And They're Offed). He always seemed to be nosy about what was going on about a case, but showed he cares about the team.
- Laboratory Technician Nikki Vega (Alexandra Adi, season 9): A lab technician who moved to Miami from another crime lab (it was never mentioned from where). Only appears in two episodes.
- Medical Examiner Tom Loman (Christian Clemenson, seasons 8–10): His work genuinely seems to excite him despite its macabre nature, even performing an autopsy on the fly for some medical students on a cadaver donated to science, which was eventually discovered to be a victim of a crime the CSIs were investigating. He occasionally laments at how violent people can be to each other, as a contrast to his usually upbeat demeanor, but it only strengthens his resolve to discover what killed those that entered his morgue. He often becomes frustrated or upset when anyone, including the CSIs, interrupts him whenever he runs with a theory or conducts an examination, or makes them wait until his theory is confirmed or if the evidence denies it, even going as far as to prevent them from collecting evidence off of the body until he conducts his examination in the autopsy room.

=== Miami-Dade Police Department ===
- MDPD Robbery-Homicide Division (RHD) Detective John Hagen (Holt McCallany, seasons 1–3): A homicide detective who had emotional and psychological problems. He was also Raymond Caine's partner prior to his faked death. He told Calleigh once that he could not stand being reminded of being the partner of a dirty cop. He also had a brief relationship with Calleigh in season 2. While pulling a crucial piece of evidence from a crime scene, he panicked when Calleigh came over to photograph the scene; he then crept up behind her and put his gun behind her head. Although he did not mean to hurt her, it allowed him time to escape (she did not know it was him at that time). He later shot himself in the Ballistics Lab right after Calleigh turned around to walk out of the lab during the season 3 finale.
- MDPD Robbery-Homicide Division (RHD) Detective Adelle Sevilla (Wanda de Jesus, season 1): A Latina homicide detective who occasionally accompanies the CSIs. She appeared in ten episodes of season 1 and is fluent in Spanish.
- MDPD Robbery-Homicide Division (RHD) Detective Bernstein (Michael Whaley, season 1): An African-American detective who also accompanies the CSIs to various crime scenes.
- MDPD Officer Aaron Jessop (Joel West, seasons 2, 4): A patrol officer, Jessop joined the force during season 2 and his first appearance was in "The Oath". While he thought like a cop, he also was able to think like a CSI. This was evident in "The Oath", where he was able to help Calleigh assess the crime scene and upped the charge and penalty. Jessop was killed when he opened a cabinet rigged with a hand grenade booby trap at the scene of a Mala Noche shootout, leaving Horatio and the other CSIs distraught at his death. (West had previously appeared as Officer Ramirez in the season 2 episode "Big Brother".)
- MDPD Robbery-Homicide Division (RHD) Detective Jake Berkeley (Johnny Whitworth, seasons 5–8): An undercover officer with the MDPD narcotics unit. As of episode 5.12 ("Internal Affairs"), he has moved to being a robbery-homicide detective. He and Calleigh dated while they were in the Academy. At the end of season 5 and in season 6, they had again begun a relationship, but new department regulations involving officer fraternization and pressure from Rick Stetler caused Berkeley to break things off. He resumed his undercover duty in episode 8.21 ("Meltdown"), tracking a gang of diamond thieves.

=== Relatives and friends of the CSI team ===
- Raymond Caine (Dean Winters and Chistopher Stapleton): Horatio's brother who faked his death while working undercover. Horatio was deeply in love with Yelina Salas, Raymond's wife. He is eventually reunited with his wife, Yelina, and son Ray Jr. with the three flying to Rio to start a new life for themselves. Unfortunately, Ray's attempts to get clean fail, and over time, he becomes involved with the Mala Noche and is later beaten to death by Antonio Riaz, and dies in Horatio's arms, but not before urging Horatio to save Ray Jr.
- Raymond Caine, Jr. (Alex Buck, Hayden Tank, and Carter Jenkins, seasons 1–5), Horatio's nephew, son of Yelina and Raymond Caine (Horatio's brother). He is first introduced in "Grave Young Men", when Horatio finds out that he has been getting into fights at school. He tells Horatio that he has been fighting because people keep calling his dad a "dirty cop", to which Horatio replies, "You know that's not true". He appears in "Hell Night", it is discovered that a homeless man died from a heart attack after being shot with a paintball gun, and Ray Jr. becomes the primary suspect. However, he is cleared when a tape reveals that he asked the shooter to stop. He is seen at the end of "Nothing To Lose" when he donates bone marrow to save Madison Keaton, who is terminally ill. Then, Yelina finds out Madison is in fact Ray's daughter, not Horatio's. He is briefly seen in "Whacked" when Horatio goes to Yelina's house. When he arrives there, Sergeant Rick Stetler is leaving. Shortly afterward, Ray Jr. expresses resentment toward Stetler. He is seen again in "10-7", the season 3 finale, when he is kidnapped by people who are trying to flush his father out of hiding. They are later reunited and fly to Brazil. On the season 5 premiere, "Rio", Mala Noche leader Antonio Riaz is revealed to have tried to involve Ray Jr. in a drug-running scheme. Horatio kills Riaz, but not before Riaz murders Ray Sr. Ray Jr. has not been seen since season 5, but he is assumed to be back in Miami with Yelina.
- Madison Keaton (Kyndell Rose Crowell) (seasons 1–3): The illegitimate daughter of Raymond Caine and Susie Barnam Keaton (episode 208, "Big Brother"). In a later episode, Madison becomes terminally ill. Neither Horatio nor Susie are matches for a bone marrow transplant. Horatio convinces Yelina Salas (who had assumed Madison was Horatio's daughter before Horatio told her the truth) to have her son tested. Presumably, Ray Jr. is tested and proves to be a match, and Madison is cured.
- Susie Barnam Keaton (Azura Skye, seasons 1–3): A meth addict who became involved in Horatio's personal life after revealing she had known his late brother (Raymond). After Susie rehabs in Indiana and returns to Miami, Horatio learns that her daughter (Madison) is Raymond's child (episode 208, "Big Brother").
- Kyle Harmon (Evan Ellingson): The son of Horatio Caine and Julia Winston.
- Marisol Delko Caine (Alana de la Garza, season 4, 10 premiere): Eric Delko's older sister, who had cancer. Because of the painful treatments, Eric occasionally bought medical cannabis to alleviate her pain and nausea. Afterwards, Eric helped to feed her when she had no appetite. Eric's friends and colleagues found out when the drug dealer ruined a crime scene by dropping through a skylight and then trying to save himself by mentioning that Eric brought drugs from him, although Frank Tripp at first insisted the information was "a load of crap". Unfortunately, it was the truth, and shortly thereafter Rick Stetler began investigating. Later, Marisol invited Horatio to have dinner but he refused at first. She insisted with an almost pleading look, then he accepted her invitation. They developed a romantic relationship because Marisol reminded him of Yelina Salas, his impossible love. Horatio and Marisol get married between the episodes "Shock" and "Rampage". She was shot by a Mala Noche sniper during the "Rampage" episode, and later died from her injury, leaving Horatio and Delko devastated and hellbent on seeking revenge for Marisol's death. Later, the hit was discovered to have been ordered by a Mala Noche boss named Antonio Riaz, who found out about Marisol's family connections through his relationship as her marijuana dealer. Not long after, Horatio and Delko followed Riaz to Brazil, where Horatio killed Riaz, avenging Marisol and his brother Raymond Caine, who was also killed by Riaz. Marisol returns in the season 10 premiere appearing to Horatio when he is agonizing of his wounds. He tells her he wants to go with her but Marisol reminds him he must continue living because he has a life mission to complete, then Horatio comes to his feet and rescues Natalia. Through the episode, he continues remembering his wife and the happy moments he lived with her.
- Nick Townsend (Rob Estes, season 5): Ex-husband of Natalia Boa Vista. Upon his release from prison, Nick re-entered Natalia's life as an employee of a crime-scene cleaning company who often worked crime scenes his ex-wife was assigned to process. Nick's treatment of Natalia following his parole consisted primarily of unwanted flirtation, which pushed Natalia into shoving him at a crime scene, an action Nick used as basis for a restraining order against her. Under the order, Natalia was forced to leave any crime scene Nick was sent to clean, which threatened her job. Nick subsequently agreed to drop the restraining order, provided Natalia treated him civilly from then on. Nick became a less-than-desirable presence on the job for both Natalia and Eric Delko, for whom Nick also took delight in causing discomfort due to Eric's prior romantic relationship with Natalia. Nick was murdered following a date with Maxine Valera, who'd shoved him to the floor in response to his unwanted advances and fled, thinking him dead. Though both Maxine and Natalia were suspected for the crime, Nick was in fact killed by a man whose wife had committed a murder Nick had worked that day. The man's name was Jeff Murdock and Lauren Sloan was his wife. Nick had taken Lauren's earring from the crime scene and was bludgeoned to death when he taunted Jeff and refused to return it.

=== Criminals ===
- Stewart Otis (William O'Leary, season 1): Stewart is a registered pedophile with a long record starting at age twelve. He has been in and out of prison for years and as a forensic countermeasure, he cut off his fingerprints and put them back on in a different arrangement, so that if his prints ever did come up at a crime scene they wouldn't register in the system. He has shown to be doing this a long time as he avoids cameras with ease and is very calculating.
- Clavo Cruz (Gonzalo Menendez, seasons 2–3, 5): In season 2, Clavo started out as an arrogant criminal who killed a model with his Lamborghini to protect his brother Ramon, who had accidentally drowned the model's roommate (#201 – "Blood Brothers"). When the team tried to arrest Clavo, it was revealed that the brothers' father was General Antonio Cruz, an ambassador from the Baracas, an area which was under diplomatic immunity from the United States. Therefore, they could neither arrest Clavo nor could they use any of his possessions as evidence. His older brother (Ramon) was able to be arrested, as the woman he drowned was on Canadian soil (the Canadian Embassy), had Canadian blood, and because he flew the Bahamian flag in international waters, leaving him unprotected and arrestable in the Bahamas. Clavo reappears in season 3 after being traced to the murder of a woman who was found after being swallowed and then regurgitated from a boa constrictor (#315 – "Identity"). He continues to taunt Caine, using the line "We never close", a line Caine had spoken after arresting Ramon. A blood test of General Cruz, the alleged father of Ramon and Clavo, revealed that although Clavo and Ramon had the same mother, Dona Marta Cruz, they had different fathers, making Clavo an adoptive son of General Cruz. When Caine reveals Marta's infidelity to the family, the General becomes infuriated. Caine then reminds the General that he can disown Clavo and thus rescind his immunity at any time; he does immediately, allowing the CSIs to arrest Clavo. In season 5, however, Clavo escapes custody after a cohort steals a rocket launcher from a crime scene and blows up the courthouse in which he was being arraigned (#514 – "No Man's Land"). He later lures Caine and Delko into a parking lot to find a hostage, who turns out not to be there. In the ensuing gun battle with his cohorts, Delko is nearly killed when a security guard shoots him in the head (Clavo offered him $100,000 to do so). In the next episode (#515 – "Man Down"), Clavo seeks revenge, killing his adoptive father in the consulate. Later on, Clavo's real father is revealed, and as it turns out, Clavo had smuggled illegal blood diamonds into Miami, and his escape from jail was intended to help his father sell them to underground dealers. One of the dealers is raided and shut down after the plain sight of illegal child labor by Natalia and Ryan. After being disowned by his biological father and having nothing to live for, Clavo returns to "duel" with Caine. Immediately after raising his gun at Caine, he is shot once in the chest by Caine, and dies.
- IAB Sergeant Rick Stetler (David Lee Smith, seasons 2–8): A disgraced former MDPD SOC Lieutenant and recurring nemesis of Horatio Caine and the Miami CSIs. Horatio was jealous when he was briefly involved romantically with Yelina Salas. When Stetler hit her, Horatio said to him: "Touch her again and I will kill you". She would eventually leave him—and the United States—for her husband in the season 3 finale. His harsh feelings toward Caine stemmed from bitterness over Horatio being promoted to lieutenant instead of him, believing Caine may have pulled in some "special favors" for the job. In season 3, episode "Crime Wave", Stetler later returns to warn Horatio against going after a corrupt city official, saying that he cannot protect him if Caine follows through. "Just like old times", the CSI replies (episode 5.17, "A Grizzly Murder"). Although Stetler often harasses Horatio, he has also been sympathetic and even helpful when he knew that he and the Crime Lab were being harassed/targeted by genuine bad guys. He tells Horatio to try to fight extradition when Horatio is arrested for the murder of Antonio Riaz. As of season eight (episode 8.02, "Hostile Takeover"), he was promoted to lieutenant in charge of SOC (Miami Dade Police Departments version of a SWAT team). In episode 8.21 ("Meltdown"), Stetler returns and attacks Wolfe and Walter Simmons for evidence tampering before being confronted by Horatio. In episode 8.23 ("Time Bomb"), it was revealed that Stetler himself was the one who had stolen the diamonds, and had attempted to frame Ryan for it. After being exposed, Ryan finally got the opportunity to arrest Stetler, which he did with great pleasure and also proceeded to walk through the Crime Lab with Stetler as all the personnel looked on, a repeat of the same event that Ryan had experienced upon Stetler arresting him at the beginning of the episode. It is also revealed that Stetler had been stealing cars from the impound lot for a two-year period under the alias of Carmichael and also threatening the officer in charge of the police department car impound to destroy his job if he doesn't help him by not telling the others his felonies, as well as other items he felt nobody would miss from the evidence locker. Stetler was also responsible planting the car bomb that killed States Attorney Rebecca Nevins, though his intended victim was Eric Delko. He stated the reason behind the thefts and trying to cover it up with the car bomb was for money, feeling he wasn't sufficiently compensated from a financial standpoint for his sacrifice in the police department. After being arrested, Stetler is currently awaiting trial on these charges, including capital murder.
- Joseph Ratner (William Allen Young; seasons 3–5): A disgraced former Florida trial judge and enemy of Horatio Caine. In "After the Fall", he is discovered to have murdered a prostitute, but (thanks to legal maneuvering) he is able to get away with the crime. He appears later in season 4, releasing Caine's old enemy, Walter Resden, from prison ("Under Suspicion") despite Horatio telling the judge that he would have blood on his hands. In the fifth season, he was charged with orchestrating the murder of his own daughter, but he did not believe her at the time because, in his mind, there was no way a teenage runaway could be related to him. Luckily, a DNA match later revealed the truth, and Ratner was eventually arrested in his own former chambers ("Death Eminent").
- Joseph "Joey" Salucci (seasons 4, 7) is a mob boss and murderer. Salucci was introduced in the episode "Fade Out" of the fourth season and was finally incarcerated in the episode "Wrecking Crew" of the seventh season.
- The Mala Noche (seasons 4–6) is a multi-branched gang that Horatio Caine once described as one of the most dangerous in the region and "Miami's new Mafia". First mentioned early in the fourth season, they would become a regular presence on the show for the next two years; many of the murder cases the team uncovered were carried out by one or more of the Mala Noche members. The Mala Noche was also responsible for the murder of Marisol Delko, Eric's sister and Horatio's new wife, on her wedding day. Ultimately, the gang would cease to be a viable threat in the sixth season after Horatio went to Brazil and ultimately killed its remaining leader, who had been extradited from Miami (its original leader, Antonio Riaz, was killed in the fifth-season premiere as revenge for Marisol's death).
- Walter Resden (Damian Young, season 4): A serial killer and a significant enemy of Caine's. Resden drove Caine out of his former career in the NYPD; he would appear in Miami ten years later, framing Caine for the murder of his (Caine's) girlfriend, Rachael Turner. He gets away with it, however, thanks to the help of Joseph Ratner ("Under Suspicion"), who rules that Resden be released. He reappears several episodes later, targeting the daughter of two of his former victims, and his former foster home siblings. When he attempts to kill Caine with a shotgun, Caine shoots him in the shoulder. Walter Resden is then arrested shortly afterwards, charged not only with attempted murder but murder as well, due to the discovery of new evidence against him ("Skeletons"). Although Horatio learns that Resden targeted his victims because his foster siblings allowed their foster father to brutally abuse him – his father would beat him with a belt and then lock him in a closet (one of his foster siblings tried to stop his father once and choked his father with the belt) – Caine tells Resden he has no sympathy at all for him.
- Monica West (Bellamy Young, season 4): A disgraced former Assistant Florida State Attorney. She was the one who planted Natalia Boa Vista as a mole within the MDPD's Crime Lab, hoping she would come up with evidence of corruption within the lab. However, when Natalia only brought back positive results on the lab, she got frustrated enough that she stole some money that the team seized in a raid on the Mala Noche gang. When her fiancé, Treasury Agent Peter Elliot, was looking over the money, she tipped off the FBI, causing the lab to be investigated. When Ryan Wolfe pointed out that the money was not taken from their lab, Calleigh figured it out and had Elliott confess to dereliction of duty. Calleigh made him get Monica to admit on tape that she was the one who took the money. She was then arrested and disbarred.
- Ron Saris (Kim Coates, seasons 6–7): Boyfriend and later ex-husband of Julia Winston. He was suspected by Horatio in an illegal-ammunition case, and married Julia Winston in "Going Ballistic" (the sixth-season finale). Julia double-crossed him for Caine in the season-seven premiere when he was planning to escape the United States by boat. He shot at Caine when Caine is revealed and ran; Horatio shot a fuel canister on the boat and blew it up, but Saris' body was never found. He was later revealed to have survived the explosion in "Chip/Tuck", where he was shown to have had some surgery on the left side of his face, which was burned by the explosion. He became a confidential informant for the Miami police, which ensured that Horatio and the rest of the teams could not arrest him for any crimes (as informants are given immunity), which was his intent.
- Ivan Sarnoff (Andrew Divoff season 7): is a Russian mob boss who first appeared in "Raging Cannibal" where he was a suspect in the murders of three men connected to him and his club. Sarnoff however provides them with the "real killer" Jason Weller and his testimony supposedly confirms it. Before leaving the police station Horatio confronts Ivan and claims he is going to get him. He later appears in "And They're Offed", where Horatio questioned him about his connection with Nicholas Brinks during the Gantry case. Sarnoff was ultimately incarcerated at the end of the episode, as he is being arrested, he scoffs at Horatio, promising that the CSI is bringing a world of hurt onto himself and that trouble is coming for him and his team. He later orchestrated Wolfe's kidnapping during "Target Specific" and "Wolfe in Sheep's Clothing" where he attempted to have Andrei force Ryan to cover up the murder of Ian Warner by kidnapping Billy Gantry, Mark's son. This however fails as both killers are arrested for the murder and Andrei is killed by Horatio when he tries to kill Billy. He reappeared in the season finale "Seeing Red", where he escaped and orchestrated an attack on the CSI team. He kidnapped Yelina but was shot and killed by Horatio after a pursuit. Delko was shot during the Russian attack on the CSIs, but survived after surgery during the season 8 premiere "Out Of Time".
- Robert "Bob" Starling (Roger Bart, seasons 8–9): is a budding serial killer. Starling targeted people connected to Miami Dade University in some way, specifically people whom he had believed wronged him when he was denied tenure. He created sophisticated devices to kill his victims, such as remote-controlled guns and cologne mixed with potassium that burns in contact with water. However, before he committed each of his murders, he would taunt the cops with clues he sent before committing the murders or ones he left at each crime scene. This was to prove that he was smarter than everyone and that people were wrong for denying him what he believed was rightfully his.
- Joe LeBrock (John Sharian, seasons 6, 9): Lebrock first appeared during the season 6 episode "Inside Out", where he orchestrated the break-out of four criminals that were being escorted to jail. He later appeared in the same season during "Chain Reaction", where he was finally incarcerated after trying to frame Kyle Harmon for murder. He returned during season 9 in the episode "See No Evil", where he orchestrated another breakout with his fellow inmates. Five managed to escape while one was recaptured and two were killed. Before being sent to a better-guarded prison. Lebrock expressed disappointment in his fellow inmates for acting too soon, he taunted Horatio that many of the inmates want to kill him before being sent to a different prison.
- The Miami West Five (seasons 9–10): The five inmates who escaped in the break-out orchestrated by Joe LeBrock in "See No Evil". The first of them, Tex Gilroy (Adam Dunnels), appeared in "Manhunt", where he was arrested by Horatio Caine in a bus. The second, Memmo Fierro (Robert LaSardo), a member of Mala Noche, appeared in the same episode but escaped again. He was later captured and incarcerated during "Last Stand". The third was Patrick Clarkson (Kevin Corrigan); he appeared in "About Face", where he kidnapped Natalia Boa Vista but was ultimately caught and incarcerated. The fourth was Dante Kroll (Franky G); he appeared in "Caged", where he killed Logan Shepherd, the man who testified to put him behind bars. Dante was ultimately killed by Horatio in his warehouse after trying to shoot Horatio. The fifth and last was Jack Toller (Callum Keith Rennie), a serial arsonist. He appeared in the season finale "Mayday", where he blackmailed Randy North (Ethan Embry) into shooting Horatio and drowning Natalia (the two ultimately survived). Toller and Randy were finally caught in the season 10 premiere "Countermeasures".
- Estaban Navarro a.k.a. The Miami Taunter (Kuno Becker, season 10): Esteban is a sadistic serial killer who targeted prostitutes who came to his clinic. He appeared as the main antagonist of the episodes "Look Who's Taunting", "Dead Ringer" and "Rest In Pieces", being finally caught in the end of the last one. When Samantha Owens was accused of mishandling evidence "Law and Disorder", he was let out of prison due to his lawyer, Darren Vogel's, claims. After this, it is unknown if he was re-imprisoned or set free altogether.

=== Others ===
- Special Agent Dennis Sackheim (Tom Hillmann, seasons 1–2): An FBI agent first introduced in the crossover episode, "Cross Jurisdictions" who had a contemptuous working relationship with Horatio Caine. In their first scene together, Caine confronts Sackheim for meddling in a Miami-Dade crime that may have resulted in an unnecessary death. Later they are on the waterfront at night, assuming the killer is on the boat, when in fact it is one of the killer's victims. Sackheim orders his sharpshooter to "take him out!" and Caine intercedes at the last minute, saving the victim's life.
- Secret Service Special Agent Peter Elliott (Michael B. Silver, seasons 2–5): Working in the Secret Service's Financial Crime Division, Agent Elliott had an obvious infatuation with Calleigh Duquesne that interested her, but she stopped short when she found out, after taking him to the hospital for a gunshot wound, that he was engaged to another woman. At the end of the season, it was revealed that his fiancée, Monica West, was the one that impugned the CSI lab and stole drug money seized in a raid; she caused the FBI to investigate, hoping that discrediting the lab would help her out politically. Elliot, wearing a wire, got her to confess, and she was arrested (episode 4.25, "One of Our Own").
- Bob Keaton (Max Martini, seasons 2–3): Susie Keaton's abusive, drug-dealing husband. In "Big Brother", Horatio discovers that Bob's methamphetamine is the same batch as that used by Raymond Caine on the night of his alleged death. Despite his denials, Bob is convicted of Caine's murder and jailed. When he is released (episode 3.20, "Killer Date"), it is revealed that he is an undercover DEA agent and Caine's ex-partner. Bob confirms to Horatio that his brother is still alive. His involvement in the DEA investigation and his knowledge about the Caine case leads to his murder (episode 3.22, "Vengeance").
- Assistant State Attorney Rebecca Nevins (Christina Chang, seasons 3, 6, and 8): Assistant Florida State Attorney. Rebecca was briefly romantically involved with Horatio Caine, but he broke it off when she made a deal with a criminal suspected of killing a cop, committing a series of robberies, and having a relationship with a 16-year-old girl who took part in his crimes. Nevins was not seen again after their breakup until season 6 (episodes 6.03 and 6.07, "Inside Out" and "Chain Reaction"), when she appeared as the assigned state prosecutor for Kyle Harmon on two occasions, driving a further wedge between Horatio and her. In "L.A.", Rebecca tells Horatio she has to suppress evidence submitted by CSI Jesse Cardoza due to his past history with a previous suspect in his former department. To help Horatio clear Cardoza's name, she sends Eric Delko (now the State Attorney's Forensic Expert) out with him to find the missing evidence from that previous case. In episode 8.23 ("Time Bomb"), she is killed in an explosion meant for Eric, with whom she was meeting. They were both conducting an internal investigation of the lab after diamonds were stolen from an evidence locker.
- WFOR-TV Newscaster Erica Sykes (Amy Laughlin, seasons 3–5, 9): An aggressive, ambitious young news reporter for Miami's CBS station WFOR-TV. Her antics are often described as crazy by the CSI team and they generally find her annoying, especially Ryan Wolfe. She targeted Ryan and broadcast him at close range, much to his annoyance, but in the end, the team used her tapes to find their suspect (episode 4.01, "From the Grave"). In the season 4 episode "Free Fall", Ryan warned her to stay away from two former prisoners after he suspected they were targets for murder. She refused to listen and got shot in the process. Erica revealed to Ryan that there was a mole in the lab in a special extended scene that was available on www.cbs.com after the episode "Urban Hellraisers" aired. She also helped Ryan in a case regarding abuse of eminent domain, with the government evicting people from their homes before turning the land over to a private developer (episode 5.05, "Death Eminent"). In a later episode, however, she put the life of Natalia's sister at risk by mentioning on the air that she is a victim in a kidnapping (episode 5.08, "Darkroom"). It is implied that CSI Boa Vista was jealous of Ryan and Erica's "closeness". Her last appearance is when she tries to shame a rising football star who was briefly suspected of killing a young girl: she ambushes him outside the CSI Lab, showing a leaked photo of him unconscious near the victim, but the man doesn't play her game, asks to the audience to think about the victim's family instead of his career and bluntly calls Erica "a jackal" in front of the camera, leaving her speechless and humiliated (episode 9.02, "Sudden Death").
- FBI Agent Glen Cole (Mark Rolston, seasons 4–5): An FBI agent who headed an investigation into the MDPD Crime Lab in season 4. Cole returned in season 5, working on a case involving counterfeiting and the North Korean government (episodes 4.25, "One of Our Own", 5.03, "Death Pool 100"). After appearing less-than-likable in those turns, he was painted in a more positive light during his appearance in "Miami Confidential" (season 6), when he helps the CSIs investigate a junior FBI agent who turns out to be an accessory to murder.
- Julia Winston (née Eberly) (Elizabeth Berkley, seasons 6–7): An ex-girlfriend of Horatio Caine's, from when he was working undercover, and Kyle Harmon's mother. Julia first appeared during the murder investigation of her wealthy current husband; she would serve as the show's antagonist for a time in the wake of Clavo Cruz's death, but it was eventually revealed that she was being forced into some evil actions by a psychotic ex-lover named Ron Saris. Ron would later marry Julia in the sixth-season finale, "Going Ballistic", shortly before the apparent murder of Horatio (Julia was initially one of the prime suspects in the shooting). Over time, Julia is proven to be a conflicted and mysterious woman. In the seventh-season episode, "Bombshell", it is revealed that she has bipolar disorder, but had initially stopped taking her medication for it at Ron Saris' urging. Julia was committed to a psychiatric facility after nearly committing suicide late in the seventh season, and has not been seen since.
