= Larry Detwiler =

American television director

- Occupation(s): Television director, miniature effects artist, and visual effects producer
- Known for: Visual effects: CSI: Crime Scene Investigation and CSI: Miami

Larry Detwiler is a television director, miniature effects artist, and visual effects producer. After early experience in miniature effects, he took on a supervisory role in later films including Jane Austen's Mafia!, later progressing to the title of visual effects supervisor. He has served in this capacity on the television program CSI: Crime Scene Investigation as well as its spin-off series, CSI: Miami, where he has directed several episodes.

== Career ==
Detwiler worked in miniature effects, on the 1994 television film Island City. He served as miniature effects supervisor on the 1998 film, Jane Austen's Mafia!. For the 2001 film Tomcats, Detwiler was employed as the visual effects supervisor for its production. Later production roles included work on films Control Factor and Trapped.

Detwiler worked as visual effects supervisor for the television program CSI: Crime Scene Investigation. He subsequently transitioned to the same role at CSI: Miami. In an interview with Daily Variety, Detwiler commented on the working environment with the rest of the production team on the show: "What makes us unique is that our visual effects department has gone in-house. On this show we're right down the hall from the director and the writers and can talk to them instantly about anything that's going on. It makes things a lot more collaborative and easier in terms of getting the look that's wanted for the effects." Detwiler utilized latex modeling, computer graphics, and green screen work to manipulate visual effects shots for CSI.

== Filmography ==
=== Television ===
Year	Program	Role
1994	Island City	Miniature effects
1994	Tomcat Alley	Model maker
1997	The Invader	Miniature effects
1997	Asteroid	Miniature supervisor
1999	Y2K	Visual effects coordinator
2000	CSI: Crime Scene Investigation	Visual effects supervisor (2000–2004, 92 episodes)
2000	Quarantine	Miniature supervisor
2000	Running Mates	Visual effects supervisor
2001	Trapped	Visual effects supervisor
2001	Return to Cabin by the Lake	Visual effects supervisor
2002	CSI: Miami	Visual effects supervisor (2002–2009, 99 episodes)
2003	Control Factor	Visual effects producer
2003	Do or Die	Visual effects producer
2004	CSI: Miami, video game	Director
2009	CSI: Miami, episode: "Presumed Guilty"	Director
2009	CSI: Miami, episode: "In Plane Sight"	Director
2010	CSI: Miami, episode: "Spring Breakdown"	Director

=== Film ===
Year	Film	Role
1998	Jane Austen's Mafia!	Miniature supervisor
2001	Tomcats	Visual effects supervisor

== Awards and nominations ==
Year	Award	Work	Category	Result
1997	Emmy Award	Asteroid	Outstanding Special Visual Effects	Won

== See also ==
- List of film and television directors
- Video art
- Visual effects
- Special effects
