= Sofia Milos =

Swiss-born actress

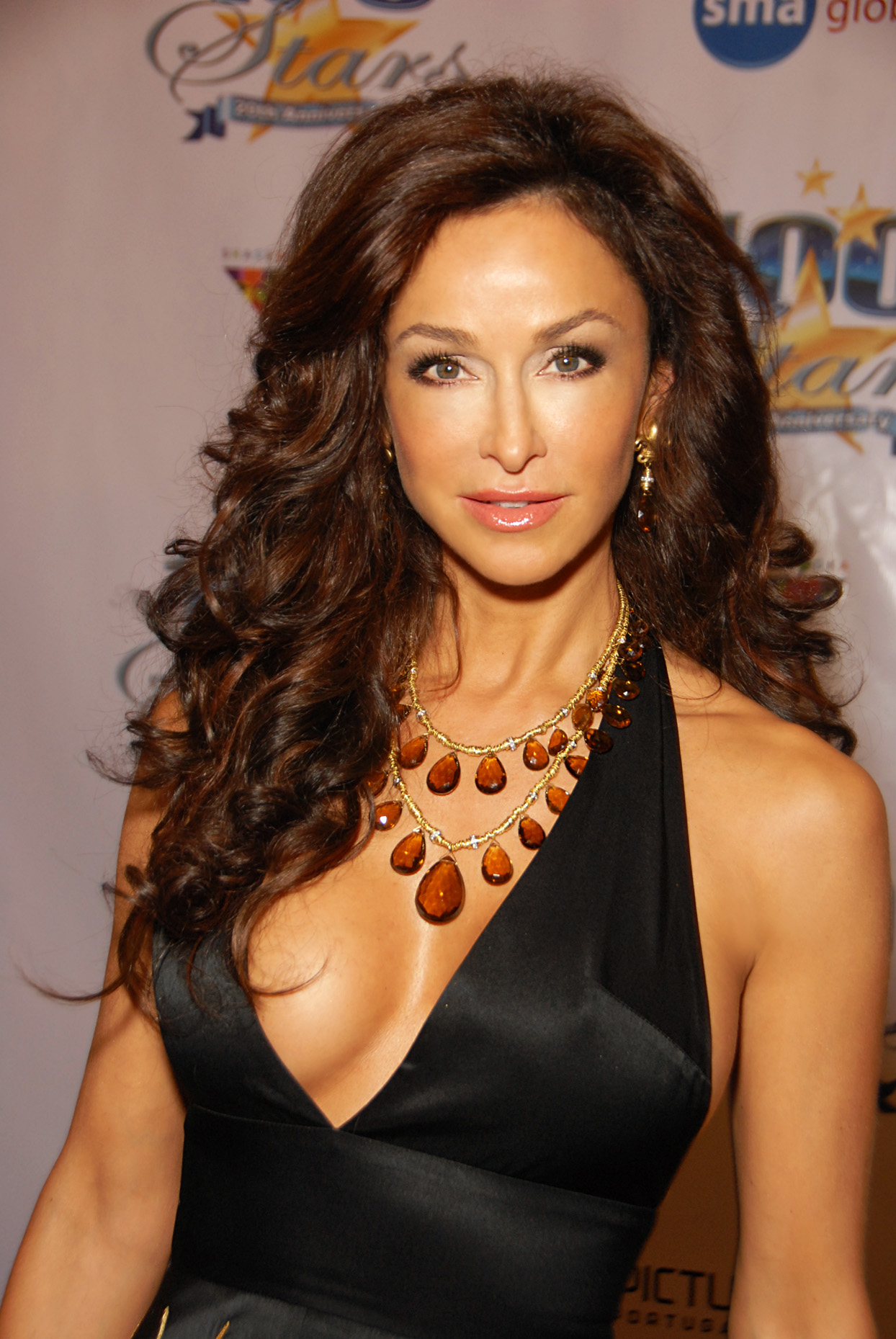
- Milos attending the "Night of 100 Stars" for the 82nd Academy Awards viewing party at the Beverly Hills Hotel on 7 March 2010
- Born: 27 September 1969 (age 56); Zürich, Switzerland
- Occupation: Actress
- Years active: 1992–present
- Website: www.sofiamilos.com

Sofia Milos (/ˈmiːloʊs/; Greek: Σοφία Μίλος, born 27 September 1969) is a Swiss-born actress. She is best known for her role as Yelina Salas on CSI: Miami. She has also had a role on The Sopranos as Camorra boss Annalisa Zucca, as well as roles in TV series such as Curb Your Enthusiasm, Mad About You, Friends and ER.

== Early life ==
Milos was born in Zürich, Switzerland, to an Italian father and a Greek mother. The family moved to Rome, Italy when she was a child. When she was 14, she entered a local beauty pageant, and after winning first prize went on to win the provincial, regional and national contests as well, receiving the title Junior Lady Italy.

Milos studied business and economics at a school in Switzerland, and she studied acting at the Beverly Hills Playhouse under acting coach Milton Katselas.

Milos claims to be fluent in seven languages.

== Career ==
When she was 15, Milos became a professional model to pay for her education in Switzerland. Her film debut came in Inside Out, an independent feature starring Kris Kristofferson and Lesley-Anne Down. Her television debut occurred in the NBC comedy Café Americain.

== Filmography ==
=== Film ===
Year	Title	Role	Notes
1993	Over the Line	Kristin	
1998	Mafia!	Young Sophia	
1999	Screw Loose	Woman in Airport	
2000	The Ladies Man	Cheryl	
2001	Double Bang	Carmela Krailes	
2001	The Order	Lieutenant Dalia Barr	
2002	Passionada	Celia Amonte	
2002	The Cross	Boss	
2003	Family Jewels	Sarah Putanesca	
2013	The Brentwood Connection	Sofia Milos	Short film
2015	The Secret of Joy	Lady of The Lake	Short film
2017	Fake News	Detective Jennifer Stern	
2019	Odissea nell'ospizio	Carla	

=== Television ===
Year	Title	Role	Notes
1993–1994	Café Americain	Fabiana Borelli	Main role (18 episodes)
1994	Friends	Aurora	Episode: "The One with the Butt"
1995	Platypus Man	Stella	Episode: "Sweet Denial"
1995	Vanishing Son	Gale Heathe	Episode: "Lock and Load, Babe"
1995	Weird Science	Ali	Episode: "Earth Boys Are Easy"
1995	Strange Luck	Jill	Episode: "The Box"
1995	Shadow-Ops	Matya	TV film
1996	Mad About You	Sarah	Episode: "The Award"
1997–1998	Caroline in the City	Julia Karinsky	Recurring role (20 episodes)
1998	Getting Personal	Dr. Angela Lopez	Episode: "The Doctor Is In"
1998	The Secret Lives of Men	Maria	Main role (13 episodes)
1998	The Love Boat: The Next Wave	Marisol	Episode: "Dust, Lust, Destiny"
2000	M.K.3	Milady	TV film
2000	The Sopranos	Annalisa Zucca	Episodes: "Commendatori", "Funhouse"
2000	Curb Your Enthusiasm	Richard's Girlfriend	Episodes: "The Pants Tent", "Affirmative Action"
2001	Thieves	Polly	Episodes: "Pilot", "The Long Con"
2002	Lo zio d'America	Barbara Steel	TV series
2002	The Twilight Zone	Francesca	Episode: "Future Trade"
2003	ER	'Coco'	Episode: "A Little Help from My Friends"
2003–2009	CSI: Miami	Detective Yelina Salas	Recurring role, Main cast Season 3 (60 episodes)
2006	Desire	Victoria Marston	Regular role (47 episodes)
2008–2009	The Border	Special Agent Bianca LeGarda	Recurring role (13 episodes)
2011	Tatort	Abby Lanning	Episode: "Wunschdenken"
2012	Section de recherches	Alison Carter	Episodes: "À la derive", "Rien ne va plus"
2012	The First Family	Silasia	Episode: "The First Stay-cation"
2013	1600 Penn	Bernice Milbert	Episode: "Dinner, Bath, Puzzle"
2016	Give Me My Baby	Dr. Hartlin	TV film
2017	Chicago Justice	Defense Attorney Mary Willis	Episode: "Dead Meat"
2017	Criminal Minds: Beyond Borders	Sergeant Alexandria Balaban	Episode: "Pankration"
2020	Project Blue Book	Daria	3 episodes
