= Matt Earl Beesley =

American film director and television director

- Occupations: Film director, television director
- Years active: 1978–present

Matthew Earl Beesley is an American film director and television director who currently lives in Bell Canyon, California; he is the son of Dr. Earl Beesley.

From 1984 to 1988, he worked as assistant director on a number of notable films including National Lampoon's Christmas Vacation (1989), The Beverly Hillbillies (1993) and Chain Reaction (1996). He made his head directorial debut with the 1998 film Point Blank starring Mickey Rourke.

Some of his television directing credits include Chicago Fire, CSI: Crime Scene Investigation, CSI: Miami, Prison Break, Lost, Law & Order: Special Victims Unit, Criminal Minds, The Closer and Hawaii Five-0.

== Personal life ==
His ex-wife is psychoanalyst Nina Savelle-Rocklin, the daughter of former San Francisco State University professor Arthur Asa Berger. Their daughter, Ariel, is a singer.
