= John Mathieson (cinematographer) =

English cinematographer and commercial director

John Mathieson CAL
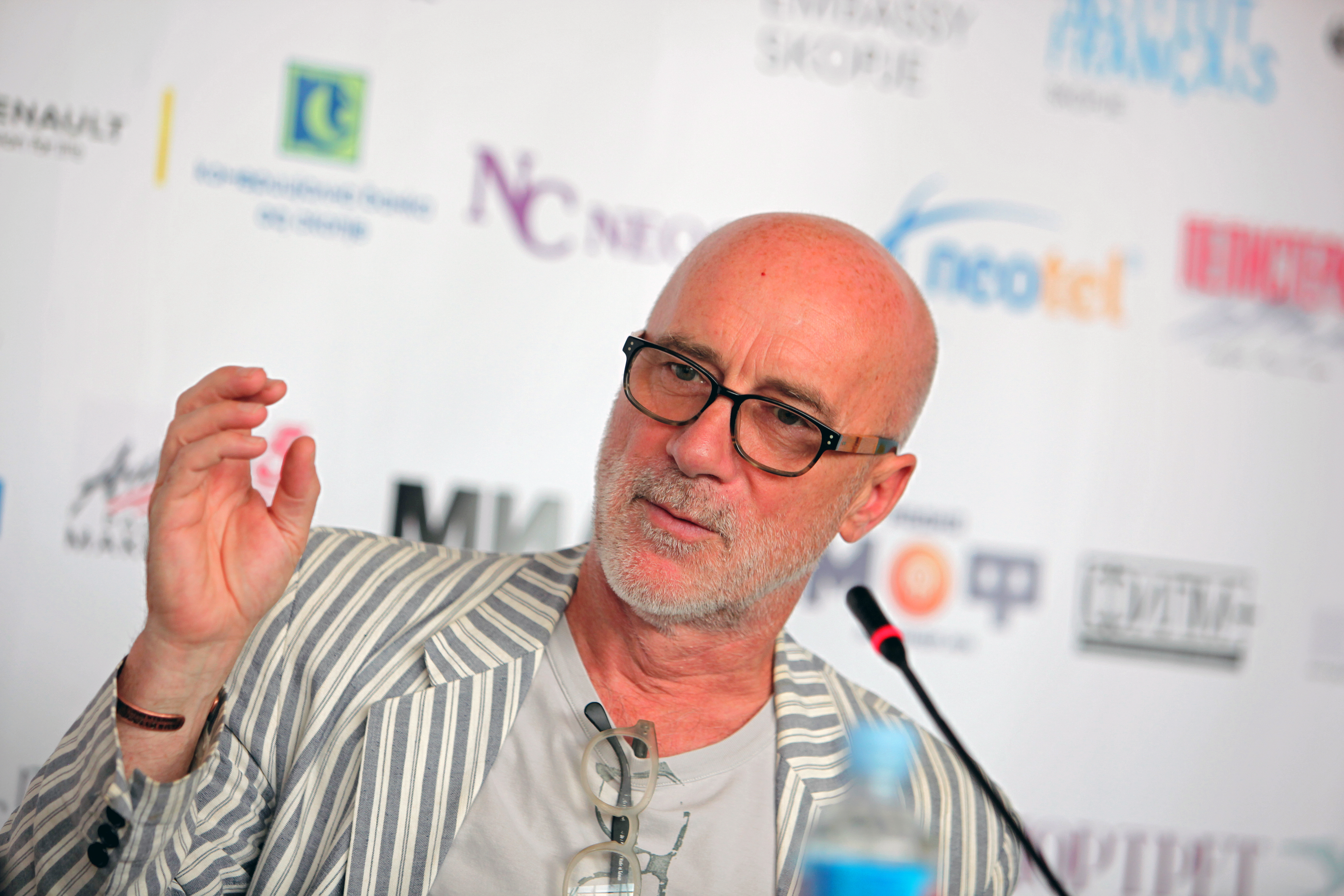
- Mathieson in 2019
- Born: 3 May 1961 (age 65); Isle of Purbeck, Dorset, England
- Years active: 1988–present
- Organization: British Society of Cinematographers
- Spouse: Maria Tamander

John Mathieson, BSC (born 3 May 1961) is an English cinematographer and commercial director. He is one of a group of filmmakers who emerged from the music video industry of the late 1980s and 1990s.

He is a frequent collaborator with director Ridley Scott, winning a BAFTA Award and a nomination for the Academy Award for his work on Gladiator (2000).

== Life and career ==
Mathieson was born on Isle of Purbeck, Dorset, England. Beginning his career in the British film industry as camera assistant to Gabriel Beristain, Mathieson worked his way through the ranks. In 1988 he garnered recognition for the ground breaking video "Peek-a-Boo" for Siouxsie and the Banshees, directed by Peter Scammell. He collaborated with John Maybury, director of the Sinéad O'Connor video "Nothing Compares 2 U", going on to photograph Maybury's award-winning film Love Is the Devil: Study for a Portrait of Francis Bacon. Mathieson honed his craft through the 1990s shooting numerous television commercials and music videos for artists including Madonna, Prince and Massive Attack.

In the mid 1990s Mathieson photographed two feature films for director Karim Dridi, for which he was later bestowed the honour of Chevalier by the French government. He came to the attention of Tony Scott whilst shooting television commercials for the London-based company RSA Films. After working as visual effects cinematographer on Enemy of the State for Tony Scott, Mathieson photographed the film Plunkett & Macleane for Jake Scott. Having seen Mathiesons work on Plunkett, Ridley Scott invited him to work on his next project. Mathieson has photographed five films for Ridley Scott, nominated for an Academy Award for Gladiator in 2000 and won the BAFTA award for best Cinematography in the same year. His second Oscar nomination came for The Phantom of the Opera (2004) directed by Joel Schumacher.

Despite a career now cemented in big budget film production, Mathieson maintains links with independent British film, working on more modest budget projects including Trauma directed by Marc Evans and Stoned directed by Stephen Woolley.

Mathieson acted as cinematographer on the DC Films production Batgirl. The film was cancelled in August 2022.

== Filmography ==
=== Feature film ===
| Year | Title | Director | Notes |
|---|---|---|---|
| 1994 | 3 Chains o' Gold | Parris Patton; Randee St. Nicholas; Prince | Direct-to-video |
| 1994 | Remembrance of Things Fast: True Stories Visual Lies | John Maybury | |
| 1994 | Pigalle | Karim Dridi | |
| 1995 | Bye-Bye | Karim Dridi | |
| 1997 | Twin Town | Kevin Allen | |
| 1998 | Love Is the Devil: Study for a Portrait of Francis Bacon | John Maybury | |
| 1998 | Vigo | Julien Temple | |
| 1999 | Plunkett & Macleane | Jake Scott | |
| 2000 | Gladiator | Ridley Scott | 1st collaboration with Scott |
| 2001 | Hannibal | Ridley Scott | |
| 2001 | K-PAX | Iain Softley | |
| 2003 | Matchstick Men | Ridley Scott | |
| 2004 | Trauma | Marc Evans | |
| 2004 | The Phantom of the Opera | Joel Schumacher | |
| 2005 | Kingdom of Heaven | Ridley Scott | |
| 2005 | Stoned | Stephen Woolley | |
| 2007 | August Rush | Kirsten Sheridan | |
| 2009 | Boogie Woogie | Duncan Ward | |
| 2009 | Cracks | Jordan Scott | |
| 2010 | Brighton Rock | Rowan Joffé | |
| 2010 | Burke & Hare | John Landis | |
| 2010 | Robin Hood | Ridley Scott | |
| 2011 | X-Men: First Class | Matthew Vaughn | |
| 2012 | Great Expectations | Mike Newell | |
| 2013 | 47 Ronin | Carl Rinsch | |
| 2015 | Pan | Joe Wright | With Seamus McGarvey |
| 2015 | The Man from U.N.C.L.E. | Guy Ritchie | |
| 2017 | King Arthur: Legend of the Sword | Guy Ritchie | |
| 2017 | Logan | James Mangold | |
| 2018 | American Woman | Jake Scott | |
| 2018 | Mary Queen of Scots | Josie Rourke | |
| 2019 | Detective Pikachu | Rob Letterman | |
| 2022 | Doctor Strange in the Multiverse of Madness | Sam Raimi | |
| 2024 | Gladiator II | Ridley Scott | |
| 2024 | Bonhoeffer | Todd Komarnicki | |
| 2025 | Jurassic World Rebirth | Gareth Edwards | |
| 2027 | Naughty † | Olivia Wilde | Filming |
| TBA | Hello & Paris † | Elizabeth Chomko | Post-production |
| TBA | Lincoln in the Bardo † | Duke Johnson | In production |

=== Television ===
| Year | Title | Director | Notes |
|---|---|---|---|
| 1997 | The Hunger | Tony Scott; Jake Scott | Episodes "The Swords" and "Ménage à Trois" |
| 2012 | Playhouse Presents | Iain Softley | Episode "The Man" |
| 2013 | The Vatican | Ridley Scott | TV movie |
| TBA | The Good Shepherd | Roland Joffé | Miniseries |

=== Music video ===
| Year | Title | Artist | Director |
|---|---|---|---|
| 1990 | "All My Trials" | Paul McCartney | Nigel Dick |
| 1991 | "Mysterious Ways" | U2 | Stéphane Sednaoui |
| 1993 | "Heart-Shaped Box" | Nirvana | Anton Corbijn |
| 1998 | "Drowned World/Substitute for Love" | Madonna | Walter Stern |
| 1998 | "Special" | Garbage | Dawn Shadforth |
| 1998 | "Rabbit in Your Headlights" | UNKLE ft. Thom Yorke | Jonathan Glazer |
| 1999 | "The World Is Not Enough" | Garbage | Philipp Stölzl |
| 2000 | "Ex-Girlfriend" | No Doubt | Hype Williams |
| 2000 | "American Pie" | Madonna | Philipp Stölzl |
| 2008 | KylieX2008 | Kylie Minogue | William Baker |
| 2012 | "Black Chandelier" | Biffy Clyro | Big TV! |

== Awards and nominations ==
| Year | Title | Award/Nomination |
|---|---|---|
| 1993 | Heart-Shaped Box | Nominated–MTV Video Music Award for Best Cinematography |
| 2000 | American Pie | Nominated–MTV Video Music Award for Best Cinematography |
| 2000 | Gladiator | BAFTA Award for Best Cinematography; Critics' Choice Movie Award for Best Cinematography; Satellite Award for Best Cinematography; Nominated–Academy Award for Best Cinematography; Nominated–ASC Award for Outstanding Achievement in Cinematography; Nominated–Chicago Film Critics Award for Best Cinematography; Nominated–Online Film Critics Society Award for Best Cinematography; Nominated–San Diego Film Critics Society Award for Best Cinematography |
| 2004 | The Phantom of the Opera | Nominated–Academy Award for Best Cinematography; Nominated–BSC Award for Best Cinematography in a Feature Film; Nominated–San Diego Film Critics Society Award for Best Cinematography; Nominated–Satellite Award for Best Cinematography |
| 2009 | Cracks | Nominated–Camerimage Golden Frog |
| 2012 | Great Expectations | Nominated–BSC Award for Best Cinematography in a Feature Film |
| 2015 | Pan | Nominated–Camerimage Jury Award for Best 3D Film |
