= Eva LaRue =

American actress and model (born 1966)

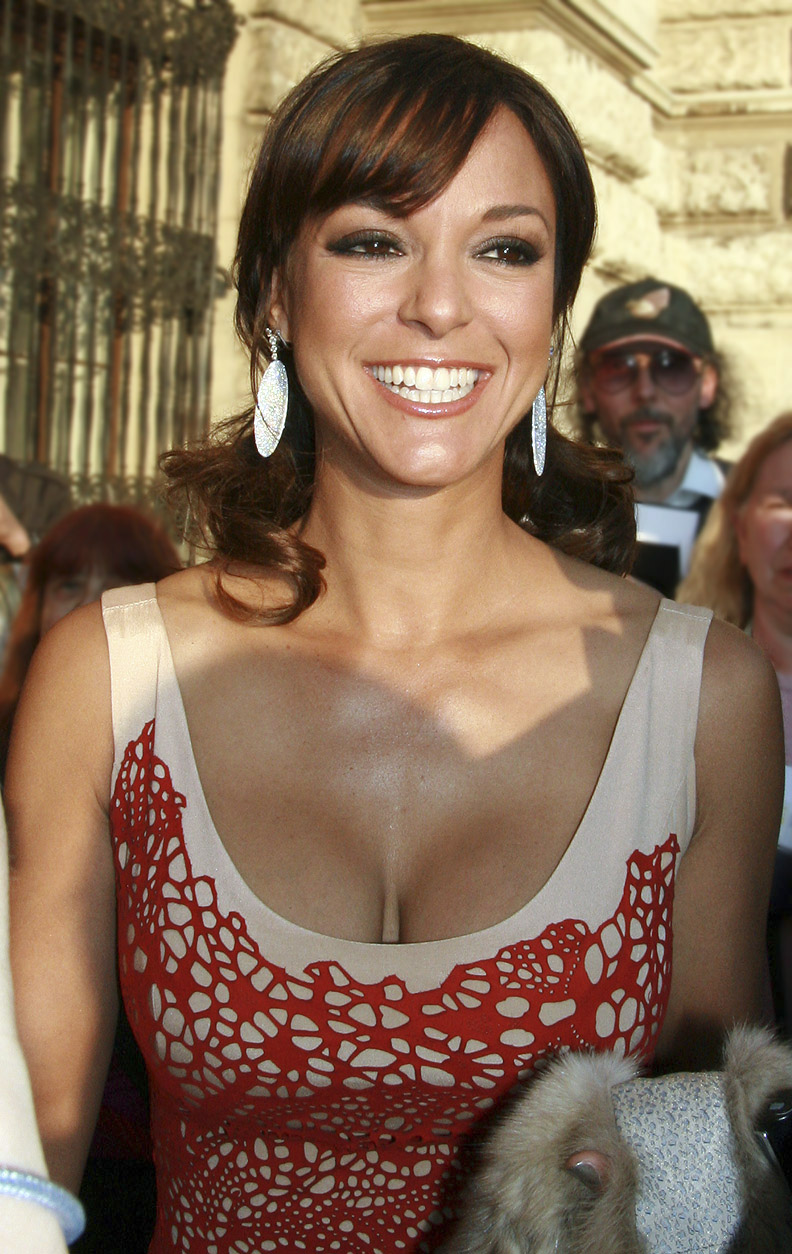
- LaRue in 2009
- Born: Eva Maria LaRue; December 27, 1966 (age 59); Long Beach, California, U.S.
- Other names: Eva LaRue Callahan; Eva Larue
- Occupations: Actress; model
- Years active: 1986–present
- Spouses: John O'Hurley (m. 1992; div. 1994); John Callahan (m. 1996; div. 2005); Joe Cappuccio (m. 2010; div. 2015)
- Children: 1

Eva Maria LaRue (/ləˈruː/; born December 27, 1966) is an American actress and model. She is known for her roles as Maria Santos on All My Children and Detective Natalia Boa Vista on CSI: Miami.

== Early life ==
LaRue was born in Long Beach, California to Marcie and Luis LaRue. She has three siblings, sisters Nika and Lara and a brother, Luis Jr. She is a member of the Baháʼí Faith.

LaRue began acting at the age of six and was later a teenage beauty queen. She won Danfranc Productions Miss California Empire 1984 title at the state pageant held in Irvine, California. In 1985, she graduated from Norco High School.

== Career ==
=== Modeling ===
LaRue started modeling after graduating from high school, first working with the Judith Fontaine Agency and eventually with Frederick's of Hollywood. She appeared in infomercials for Zumba fitness workout and Sheer Cover Studio mineral makeup. She has graced the cover of numerous magazines, including LA Direct, Vivmag, Orange Coast, InStyle Weddings, Woman's World, and Latina.

=== Acting ===
LaRue was the co-host and announcer on Candid Camera from 1991 to 1992. From 1993 to 1997, and again from 2002 to 2005, LaRue portrayed Dr. Maria Santos Grey on All My Children. There, she was half of All My Children supercouple Edmund and Maria. She received a Daytime Emmy Award nomination in the category of "Outstanding Supporting Actress in a Drama Series" for All My Children. She also received a nomination in 2004 in the category of "Outstanding Original Song" for composing the song "Dance Again with You", which was used as a backdrop to the sex scene after the third marriage of the characters Edmund and Maria in June 2003.

In 2010, LaRue reprised her role as Maria temporarily on January 5 for All My Children's 40th anniversary.

LaRue also performed in television movies over the years, appearing as Annette Funicello in a biographical movie of the former Mouseketeer and also in the adaptation of Danielle Steel's Remembrance as Princess Serena.

In 2005, LaRue portrayed Linda Lorenzo, George Lopez's "Long Lost" sister, on the TV sitcom George Lopez. In the fall 2005, LaRue began the role of Natalia Boa Vista on CSI: Miami. It was revealed in the end of season four that Eva's character, Natalia Boa Vista, was the mole in the lab reporting back to the FBI. Beginning with season five, LaRue became a full-time cast member.

In July and September 2011, LaRue reprised her role as Dr. Maria Santos Grey on All My Children as a guest star as the show wrapped up its network run on ABC. In 2013, she played Agent Tanya Mays in the episode "Final Shot" on Criminal Minds.

In July 2015, it was announced that LaRue had been cast on Fuller House, the revival series of the sitcom Full House. She portrayed the character of Teri Tanner, the affectionate wife of Danny Tanner. The series premiered on Netflix in 2016. She also played the role of the Admirable in three episodes of Mack & Moxy. In May 2019, she was cast on The Young and the Restless in the role of Celeste Rosales.

In February 2024, it was announced LaRue had been cast as Natalia Rogers-Ramirez on General Hospital; she made her episodic debut on February 26. In June of the following year, it was announced she would be exiting the role. LaRue departed the role during the July 2, 2025, episode.

== Personal life ==
LaRue's sister Nika was one of the women photographed by convicted killer Bill Bradford for his collection. The case was used in CSI: Miami in the season five episode "Darkroom" soon after the revelation. Nika guest-starred in the episode as a reporter. She was initially offered the role of Eva's on-screen sister and a surviving victim, but declined that role, describing it as being "too surreal".

LaRue was married to actor John O'Hurley for two years until 1994. She married fellow All My Children co-star John Callahan in November 1996. The couple divorced in 2005. The couple served as co-hosts of the 1997 Miss America pageant in Atlantic City, New Jersey. The couple's daughter Kaya McKenna Callahan was born in December 2001.

LaRue married businessman Joe Cappucio in June 2010. Cappucio filed for divorce in 2014, citing irreconcilable differences. Their divorce was finalized in 2015.

LaRue and her daughter were stalked by James David Rogers from 2007 to 2022, when Rogers was sentenced to 40 months in prison for his actions.

LaRue is the godmother of Michael Consuelos. She and her All My Children co-star Kelly Ripa have been close friends since LaRue joined the cast of the daytime soap. LaRue has known Kelly's son since he was born.

== Filmography ==
=== Film ===
Year	Title	Role	Notes
1987	The Barbarians	Ismene / Kara	
1988	Dangerous Curves	Leslie Cruz	
1990	Heart Condition	Peisha	
1990	Crash and Burn	Parice	Video
1991	Ghoulies III: Ghoulies Go to College	Erin Riddle	Video
1991	Legal Tender	Newscaster	
1993	Body of Influence	Fourth Woman	Video
1993	RoboCop 3	Debbie Dix	
1993	Mirror Images 2	Phyllis	Video
1995	A Dream Is a Wish Your Heart Makes	Annette Funicello	TV movie
1996	Remembrance	Serena Principessa	TV movie
1997	Out of Nowhere	Denise Johnson	TV movie
1998	Ice	Alison	TV movie
1998	One Hell of a Guy	Daphne	
2006	Cries in the Dark	Carrie	TV movie
2008	Lakeview Terrace	Lt. Morgada	
2011	Grace in Sara	Dr. Lopez	Short
2012	Help for the Holidays	Sara Vancamp	TV movie
2015	Dancer and the Dame	Nicole	
2015	Letter Never Sent	Mrs Sampson	TV movie
2016	A Killer Walks Amongst Us	Karen	
2018	Orphan Horse	Masta Jenkins	
2023	Insane	Dr. Maya Rivera	Short
2024	The Engagement Plan	Margot	TV movie

=== Television ===
Year	Title	Role	Notes
1986	The New Gidget	Julie	Episode: "The Project"
1986	The Love Boat	Bikini Girl #4	Episode: "The Christmas Cruise: Part 1 & 2"
1987	Rags to Riches	Julianne Taylor	Episode: "Beauty and the Babe"
1988	Santa Barbara	Margot Collins	Regular Cast
1989	She's the Sheriff	-	Episode: "Divorce, Wiggins Style"
1989	Charles in Charge	Daphne Prentiss	Episode: "Chargin' Charles"
1989	Perfect Strangers	'A' Student	Episode: "Teacher's Pest"
1989	Freddy's Nightmares	Gina	Episode: "Missing Persons"
1990	Married... with Children	Carrie	Episode: "Rock and Roll Girl"
1990	Dragnet	Nancy Moir	Episode: "Little Miss Nobody"
1991	They Came from Outer Space	Juanita Gillespie	Episode: "Animal Magnetism"
1991	Dallas	DeeDee	Episode: "Win Some, Lose Some"
1991	The New Adam-12	Maria	Episode: "Missing"
1991–92	Candid Camera	Herself/Co-Host	Main Co-Host
1992	Dark Justice	-	Episode: "Teenage Pajama Party Massacre: Part IV"
1993	Nurses	Cindy	Episode: "Super Bowl"
1993–11	All My Children	Dr. Maria Santos Grey	Regular Cast
1997	Head Over Heels	Carmen Montaglio	Main Cast
1998	Diagnosis: Murder	Kathryn Wately	Episode: "Wrong Number"
1999	Soldier of Fortune, Inc.	Dr. Newman	Episode: "Critical List"
1999	Grown Ups	Claire	Episode: "J Says"
1999	For Your Love	Fariba	Episode: "The Girl Most Likely To..."
2000–01	Third Watch	Brooke	Recurring Cast: Season 1-2
2000–01	Soul Food	Josefina Alicante	Recurring Cast: Season 1, Guest: Season 2
2001	The Test	Herself/Panelist	Episode: "The Courage Test"
2001	Intimate Portrait	Herself	Episode: "Kelly Ripa"
2003–11	Biography	Herself	Recurring Guest
2004	Pyramid	Herself/Celebrity Contestant	Episode: "9 & 13 February 2004"
2004	Hope & Faith	Herself	Episode: "Daytime Emmys: Part 1 & 2"
2004	1 Day with...	Herself	Episode: "Eva LaRue"
2005	Party Planner with David Tutera	Herself	Episode: "Susan Lucci's Star"
2005	George Lopez	Linda Lorenzo	Recurring Cast: Season 4
2005	Modern Girl's Guide to Life	Herself	Main Cast
2005–12	CSI: Miami	Natalia Boa Vista	Recurring Cast: Season 4, Main Cast: Season 5-10
2006	E! True Hollywood Story	Herself	Episode: "Kelly Ripa"
2007	The Drop	Herself	Episode: "Eva LaRue/Paula De Anda/Dance Battle"
2010	Iron Chef America	Herself/ICA Judge	Episode: "Cora vs. Smith: Grapes"
2013	Criminal Minds	Agent Tanya Mays	Episode: "Final Shot"
2014	Hell's Kitchen	Herself	Episode: "18 Chefs Compete"
2016	Fuller House	Teri Tanner	Episode: "Our Very First Show, Again"
2016	Mack & Moxy	Admirable Eva	Recurring Cast
2018–20	Chicken Soup for the Soul's Animal Tales	Herself/Host	Main Host
2019	The Young and the Restless	Celeste Rosales	Regular Cast
2020	Finding Love in Quarantine	Amber Russell	Recurring Cast
2020–21	The Family Business	Kim	Recurring Cast: Season 2-3
2021	Reunion Road Trip	Herself	Episode: "All My Children"
2024–25	General Hospital	Natalia Rogers-Ramirez	Regular Cast

=== Documentary ===
Year	Title	Role	Notes
2015	Liao Chongzhen: A Bright Candle of the Light of Humanity	Narrator	
2016	World Peace: A Bahaʼi Vision	Narrator	
2016	Carole Lombard	Narrator	

== Awards ==
Year	Association	Category	Work	Result
2020	Daytime Emmy Award	Outstanding Guest Performer in a Drama Series	The Young and the Restless	Won

Media offices
Preceded by Regis Philbin (solo host)	Miss America Pageant host 1997 (co-host with John Callahan)	Succeeded by Boomer Esiason and Meredith Vieira
