= 1995 Cannes Film Festival =

- Official poster of the 48th Cannes Film Festival: an original illustration by Ryszard Horowitz.
- Opening film: The City of Lost Children
- Closing film: The Quick and the Dead
- Location: Cannes, France
- Founded: 1946
- Awards: Palme d'Or: Underground
- Hosted by: Carole Bouquet
- No. of films: 24 (In Competition)
- Festival date: 17 May 1995 – 28 May 1995
- Website: festival-cannes.com/en

Cannes Film Festival
- 1996 1994

The 48th Cannes Film Festival took place from 17 to 28 May 1995. French actress Jeanne Moreau served as jury president for the main competition. French actress Carole Bouquet hosted the opening and closing ceremonies.

Serbian filmmaker Emir Kusturica won the Palme d'Or, the festival's top prize, for a second time with the comedy-drama film Underground.

The festival opened with The City of Lost Children by Marc Caro and Jean-Pierre Jeunet, and closed with The Quick and the Dead by Sam Raimi.

1995 Un Certain Regard poster, adapted from an original illustration by Enki Bilal.

== Juries ==
=== Main competition ===
- Jeanne Moreau, French actress - Jury President
- Gianni Amelio, Italian filmmaker
- Jean-Claude Brialy, French actor and director
- Nadine Gordimer, South African author
- Gaston Kaboré, Burkinabé filmmaker
- Michele Ray-Gavras, French producer and journalist
- Emilio García Riera, Mexican actor, writer and film critic
- Philippe Rousselot, French cinematographer
- John Waters, American filmmaker
- Mariya Zvereva, Russian

=== Camera d'Or ===
- Michel Deville, French filmmaker - Jury President
- Alberto Barbera, Italian film critic
- Didier Beaudet, French
- N.T. Binh, French Distributor
- Michel Demopoulos, French film critic
- István Gaál, Hungarian filmmaker
- Caroline Million-Rousseau, French Cinephile

== Official selection ==
=== In Competition ===
The following feature films competed for the Palme d'Or:

English title	Original title	Director(s)	Production country
Angels and Insects		Philip Haas	United States, United Kingdom
Between the Devil and the Deep Blue Sea		Marion Hänsel	Belgium, France
Beyond Rangoon		John Boorman	United States
Carrington		Christopher Hampton	United Kingdom, France
The City of Lost Children (opening film)	La Cité des enfants perdus	Marc Caro and Jean-Pierre Jeunet	France, Spain, Germany
The Convent	O Convento	Manoel de Oliveira	Portugal, France
Dead Man		Jim Jarmusch	United States
Don't Forget You're Going to Die	N'oublie pas que tu vas mourir	Xavier Beauvois	France
Ed Wood		Tim Burton	United States
Good Men, Good Women	好男好女	Hou Hsiao-hsien	Taiwan, Japan
La Haine		Mathieu Kassovitz	France
Jefferson in Paris		James Ivory	France, United States
Kids		Larry Clark	United States
Land and Freedom	Tierra y Libertad	Ken Loach	United Kingdom, Spain, France, Germany, Italy
The Madness of King George		Nicholas Hytner	United Kingdom
Nasty Love	L'amore molesto	Mario Martone	Italy
The Neon Bible		Terence Davies	United Kingdom
Shanghai Triad	搖啊搖，搖到外婆橋	Zhang Yimou	China
Sharaku	写楽	Masahiro Shinoda	Japan
The Snails' Senator	Senatorul melcilor	Mircea Daneliuc	Romania
Stories from the Kronen	Historias del Kronen	Montxo Armendáriz	Spain, France, Germany
Ulysses' Gaze	Το βλέμμα του Οδυσσέα	Theo Angelopoulos	Greece
Underground	Подземље	Emir Kusturica	Yugoslavia, Bulgaria, Czech Republic, France, Germany, Hungary
Waati		Souleymane Cissé	Mali

=== Un Certain Regard ===
The following films were selected for the competition of Un Certain Regard:

English title	Original title	Director(s)	Production country
The Arsonist	Kaki bakar	U-Wei Haji Saari	Malaysia
L'aube à l'envers		Sophie Marceau	France
Augustin		Anne Fontaine	France
Bye-Bye		Karim Dridi	France
The Outpost	A részleg	Péter Gothár	Hungary, Romania
Canadian Bacon		Michael Moore	United States, Canada
The Englishman Who Went up a Hill but Came down a Mountain		Christopher Monger	United Kingdom, United States
Evening Liaison	人约黄昏	Chen Yifei	China, Hong Kong
Georgia		Ulu Grosbard	United States
Haramuya		Drissa Toure	Burkina Faso, France
Lessons in the Language of Love		Scott Patterson	Australia
The Lion with the White Beard	Лев с седой бородой	Andrei Khrzhanovsky	Russia
Lisbon Story	O Céu de Lisboa	Wim Wenders	Germany, Portugal, France, Spain
The Monkey Kid	猴三儿	Xiao-Yen Wang	China, United States
Music for December	Музыка для декабря	Ivan Dykhovichny	Russia
The Poison Tasters		Ulrik Theer	United States
Rude		Clement Virgo	Canada
Hello Cinema	سلام سینما	Mohsen Makhmalbaf	Iran
Shadows of the Rainbow	Indradhanura Chhai	Sushant Misra	India
Things to Do in Denver When You're Dead		Gary Fleder	United States
Those Were the Days	Le plus bel âge...	Didier Haudepin	France
Time of Love	نوبت عاشقی	Mohsen Makhmalbaf	Iran, Turkey
Two Nudes Bathing		John Boorman	United Kingdom
Under the Domim Tree	עץ הדומים תפוס	Eli Cohen	Israel
Unstrung Heroes		Diane Keaton	United States
Voyage in Time	Tempo di Viaggio	Tonino Guerra and Andrei Tarkovsky	Italy

=== Out of Competition ===
The following films were selected to be screened out of competition:

English title	Original title	Director(s)	Production country
Desperado		Robert Rodriguez	United States
Kiss of Death		Barbet Schroeder	United States
The Quick and the Dead (closing film)		Sam Raimi	United States
To Die For		Gus Van Sant	United States, United Kingdom
The Usual Suspects		Bryan Singer	United States, Germany

=== Short Films Competition ===
The following short films competed for the Short Film Palme d'Or:

- A Hamok Dala by Ferenc Cako
- Despondent Divorcee by Jonathan Ogilvie
- Domo by Maurizio Forestieri
- Gagarine by Alexij Kharitidi
- Cocoon (Koza) by Nuri Bilge Ceylan
- Les Enfants s'ennuient le Dimanche by Sophie Perez, Matthieu Poirot-Delpech
- Sortie de Bain by Florence Henrard
- Swinger by Gregor Jordan
- The Beast by Rhoderyc C. Montgomery
- The Pan Loaf by Sean Hinds

== Parallel sections ==
=== International Critics' Week ===
The following films were screened for the 34th International Critics' Week (34e Semaine de la Critique):

Feature film competition

- Manneken Pis by Frank Van Passel (Belgium)
- Soul Survivor by Stephen Williams (Canada)
- The Daughter-in-law (A ba de qing ren) by Steve Wang Hsieh-Chih (Taiwan)
- Mute Witness by Anthony Waller (Germany)
- Denise Calls Up by Hal Salwen (United States)
- Madagascar skin by Chris Newby (United Kingdom)
- Los hijos del viento by Fernando Merinero (Spain)

Short film competition

- An Evil Town by Richard Sears (United States)
- Movements of the Body by Wayne Traudt (Canada)
- Ubu by Manuel Gomez (France, Belgium)
- The Last Laugh by Robert Harders (United States)
- Adios, toby, adios by Ramón Barea (Spain)
- Surprise! by Veit Helmer (Germany)
- Le Pendule by Madame Foucault by Jean-Marc Vervoort (Belgium)

=== Directors' Fortnight ===
The following films were screened for the 1995 Directors' Fortnight (Quinzaine des Réalizateurs):

- 3 Steps To Heaven by Constantine Giannaris
- An Awfully Big Adventure by Mike Newell
- The White Balloon (Badkonake sefid) by Jafar Panahi
- Café Society by Raymond DeFelitta
- Der Kopf des Mohren by Paulus Manker
- Eggs by Bent Hamer
- Eldorado by Charles Binamé
- Faute de soleil by Christophe Blanc
- Heartbreak Island by Hsu Hsiao-Ming
- Heavy by James Mangold
- The Tale of the Three Lost Jewels (Hikayatul jawahiri thalath) by Michel Khleifi
- L'Enfant noir by Laurent Chevallier
- The Confessional (Le confessionnal) by Robert Lepage
- Le Rocher d'Acapulco by Laurent Tuel
- Nella mischia by Gianni Zanasi
- Pather Panchali by Satyajit Ray
- Revivre by Jean-Luc Raynaud
- Safe by Todd Haynes
- Someone Else's America (Tuđa Amerika) by Goran Paskaljevic
- Sommaren by Kristian Petri
- Visiblement je vous aime by Jean-Michel Carré

Short films

- Le Bus by Jean-Luc Gaget
- Corps inflammables by Jacques Maillot
- Rebonds by Marine Place
- La Vie à Rebours by Gaël Morel
- Une visite by Philippe Harel

== Official Awards ==
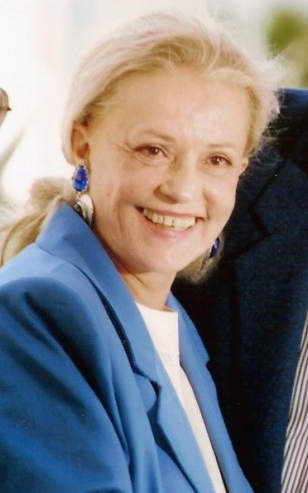
Jeanne Moreau, Jury President

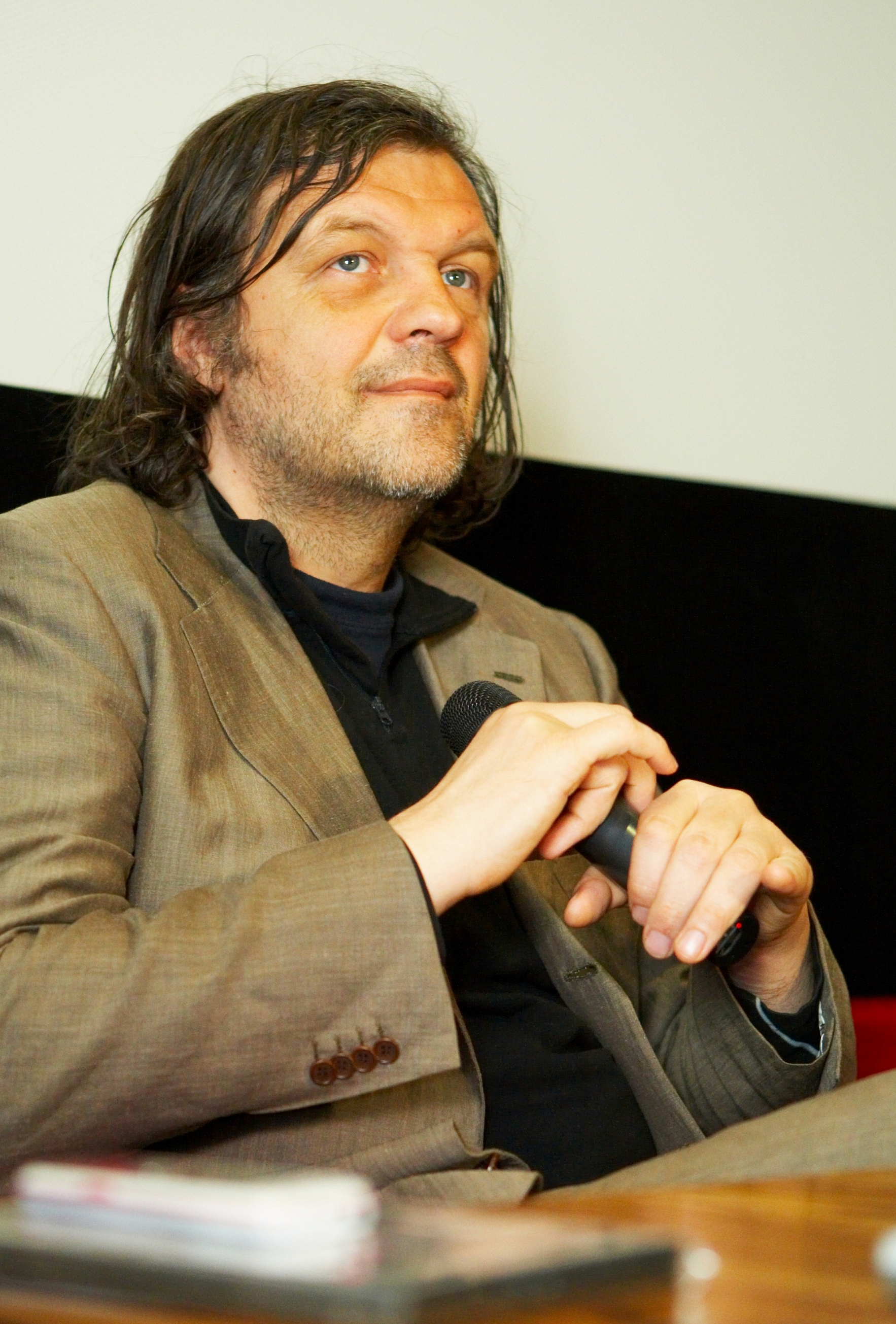
Emir Kusturica, Palme d'Or winner

=== In Competition ===
- Palme d'Or: Underground by Emir Kusturica
- Grand Prize of the Jury: Ulysses' Gaze by Theo Angelopoulos
- Best Director: Mathieu Kassovitz for La Haine
- Best Actress: Helen Mirren for The Madness of King George
- Best Actor: Jonathan Pryce for Carrington
- Jury Prize: Don't Forget You're Going to Die by Xavier Beauvois
- Jury Special Prize: Carrington by Christopher Hampton

=== Caméra d'Or ===
- The White Balloon by Jafar Panahi
  - Special Mention: Denise Calls Up by Hal Salwen

=== Short Film Palme d'Or ===
- Gagarin by Alexij Kharitidi
- Jury Prize: Swinger by Gregor Jordan

== Independent awards ==
=== FIPRESCI Prizes ===
- Land and Freedom by Ken Loach (In competition)
- Ulysses' Gaze by Theo Angelopoulos (In competition)

=== Commission Supérieure Technique ===
- Technical Grand Prize: Lü Yue (cinematography) in Shanghai Triad by Zhang Yimou

=== Prize of the Ecumenical Jury ===
- Land and Freedom by Ken Loach
  - Special Mention: Between the Devil and the Deep Blue Sea by Marion Hänsel

=== Award of the Youth ===
- Foreign Film: Manneken Pis by Frank Van Passel
- French Film: Bye-Bye by Karim Dridi

=== International Critics' Week ===
- Mercedes-Benz Award: Manneken Pis by Frank Van Passel
- Canal+ Award: An Evil Town by Richard Sears
- Grand Golden Rail: Manneken Pis by Frank Van Passel

=== Special Award ===
- Miracle in Bosnia by Dino Mustafić

== Media ==
- INA: Opening of the 1995 Festival (commentary in French)
- INA: List of winners of the 1995 Festival (commentary in French)
