= John Callahan (actor) =

American actor (1953–2020)

- Born: John Kevin Callahan; December 23, 1953; Brooklyn, New York, U.S.
- Died: March 28, 2020 (aged 66); Rancho Mirage, California, U.S.
- Occupation: Actor
- Years active: 1982–2020
- Spouses: Linda Freeman (m. 1982; div. 1994) Eva LaRue (m. 1996; div. 2005)
- Children: 1

John Kevin Callahan (December 23, 1953 – March 28, 2020) was an American actor, known for his work as Edmund Grey on the daytime soap opera All My Children and Eric Stavros on Falcon Crest.

== Early life ==
Callahan was born in Brooklyn, New York. He was a pre-law student at University of California at Berkeley before pursuing a career in acting.

== Career ==
Callahan portrayed Leo Russell on the daytime soap General Hospital from 1984 to 1985. Subsequent roles included Eric Stavros on the prime time series Falcon Crest from 1986 to 1988, and Craig Hunt on the daytime soap Santa Barbara from 1989 to 1991. He played Edmund Grey, his best known role, on All My Children from 1992 to 2005. Callahan also appeared as Edmund, with co-star Esta TerBlanche, in a 1997 episode of the sitcom Spin City called "My Life is a Soap Opera". From 2008 to 2010, he played Richard Baker on Days of Our Lives.

Callahan and his co-star Eva LaRue co-hosted both the Lifetime series Weddings of a Lifetime in 1995 and the 1997 Miss America pageant.

Callahan appeared on the 1990 revival of the television game show To Tell the Truth as a celebrity panelist.

== Personal life and death ==
Callahan was married to Linda Freeman from 1982 to 1994, and has two stepsons from the union. He married his All My Children co-star Eva LaRue, who portrayed Edmund's love interest Maria Santos, on November 30, 1996 on the island of Lanai in Hawaii. They have a daughter, Kaya McKenna, born in December 2001. They divorced in 2005.

Callahan died on March 28, 2020, after suffering a stroke the previous day, and having been taken to Eisenhower Medical Center in Rancho Mirage where he was put on life support.

== Filmography ==
=== Film ===
Year	Title	Role	Notes	Ref.
1996	Marvin's Room	Lance	Drama film directed by Jerry Zaks; Film adaptation of play of the same name	
1997	His and Hers	Scott	Independent comedy film written & directed by Hal Salwen	
2009	Lost in the Woods	Dan Rogers	Comedy film directed by Andrew James	
2011	eCupid	Mr. Hutchington	Romantic comedy film directed by J.C. Calciano	
2014	Tentacle 8	Man in Towne Car	Mystery film written & directed by John Chi	
2014	Zoe Gone	Dr. Phillips	Mystery film directed by Conor Allyn	
2017	Do It or Die	Harry Chaddick	Drama film directed by Jorn Winther	
2017	A Doggone Hollywood	Television director	Family film written and directed by Jim Wynorski	
2018	A Doggone Adventure	Beeson Crowder	Family film directed by Tony Randel	
Upcoming	Loyalty	Clyde	Thriller film directed by Michael Satchell (Completed)	

=== Television ===
Year	Title	Role	Notes	Ref.
1982	Seven Brides for Seven Brothers	Reporter	Episode: "Heritage" (S 1:Ep 14)	
1983	M.A.D.D.: Mothers Against Drunk Drivers	Officer Landers	Made-for-television Movie directed by William Graham	
1983	Emerald Point N.A.S.	Lt. Jim Travers	Episode: "Episode 8" (S 1:Ep 8)	
1983	The Mississippi	French	Episode: "G.I. Blues" (S 2:Ep 10)	
1983	Three's Company	Handsome socialite	Episode: "Now You See It, Now You Don't" (S 8:Ep 10)	
1983	Days of Our Lives	Tyler Malone		
1984	When She Says No	Peter Wheaton	Made-for-television movie directed by Paul Aaron	
1984	Emerald Point N.A.S.	Lt. Jim Travers	Episode: "Friends and Lovers" (S 1:Ep 20)	
1984	Fantasy Island	Pete	Episode: "The Awakening of Love / The Impostor" (S 7:Ep 17)	
1984	General Hospital	Leo Russell	Recurring; April 12, 1984–85	
1985	Hotel	Duncan Wingfield	Episode: "Saving Grace" (S 3:Ep 6)	
1986	Falcon Crest	Eric Stavros	Recurring; February 21, 1986 – May 13, 1988	
1986	The Tonight Show Starring Johnny Carson	Himself	Episode: "3–416" (S 25:Ep 21)	
1987	Murder, She Wrote	Garrett Harper	Episode: "Doom with a View" (S 4:Ep 11)	
1989	Days of Our Lives	Artie Doyle	April 1989	
1989	Murder, She Wrote	Preston Howard	Episode: "Test of Wills" (S 6:Ep 9)	
1989	Santa Barbara	Craig Hunt	Contract: August 9, 1989 – January 27, 1992	
1991	The Image Workshop	Host / Himself		
1992	All My Children	Edmund Grey	Contract: April 13, 1992 – March 2, 2005	
1994	21st Daytime Emmy Awards	Himself	Television special directed by Roger Goodman	
1995	22nd Daytime Emmy Awards	Himself / Presenter	Television special directed by Louis J. Horvitz	
1995	Weddings of a Lifetime	Himself / Host	Television special written and directed by Kathleen Murtha	
1997	Spin City	Edmund Grey	Episode: "My Life Is a Soap Opera" (S 2:Ep 8)	
1997	77th Miss America Pageant	Host	Television special directed by Jeff Margolis	
1998	ABC Soaps' Most Unforgettable Love Stories	Edmund Grey	Made-for-television movie directed by Kathie Farrell and Nancy Stern; Archival footage	
2006	Desperate Housewives	Stan	Episode: "Remember, parts 1 & 2" (S 2:Ep 23 & 24)	
2006	Watch Over Me	Richard Porter	Recurring; 4 episodes	
2007	Bone Eater	Seth Pomeroy	Made-for-television movie written & directed by Bob Robertson	
2008	Cold Case	Bruce Donnelly '08	Episode: "The Dealer" (S 6:Ep 6)	
2008	Days of Our Lives	Dr. Baker	Contract: November 24, 2008 – August 26, 2010	
2010	Dinocroc vs. Supergator	Charlie Swanson	Made-for-television movie written & directed by Andrew James	
2010	The Bay	Det. Mackenzie Johnson	Main cast	
2015	Sharkansas Women's Prison Massacre	Carl	Made-for-television movie directed by Jim Wynorski	
2016	Ladies of the Lake	Tommy Nolan	Miniseries directed by Sonia Blangiardo	

=== Documentaries and videos ===
Year	Title	Role	Notes	Ref.
1994	Daytime's Most Wanted: Men of Passion	Himself	Videocassette	
2003	Biography	Edmund Grey	Television documentary; Archival footage	

Media offices
Preceded by Regis Philbin (solo host)	Miss America Pageant host 1997 (co-host with Eva LaRue)	Succeeded by Boomer Esiason and Meredith Vieira
