= His & Hers (1997 film) =

- Directed by: Hal Salwen
- Written by: Hal Salwen
- Produced by: Victor Loewy; Charlotte Mickie
- Starring: Liev Schreiber; Caroleen Feeney; Michael Rispoli; Cynthia Watros; Danny Hoch; N'Bushe Wright
- Cinematography: Claudia Raschke
- Distributed by: Alliance Independent Films
- Release date: January 24, 1997 (U.S.)
- Running time: 82 minutes
- Country: United States
- Language: English

His & Hers is a 1997 American independent comedy film which premiered at the 1997 Sundance Film Festival. Written and directed by Hal Salwen, it is a modern screwball comedy, the plot of which centers around the accidental amputation of a finger.

== Plot ==
While chopping carrots in her suburban kitchen, a nervous housewife, Carol (Caroleen Feeney), accidentally chops off her husband Glenn's (Liev Schreiber) pinky, causing the detached finger to fly out the window and into the backyard. After chasing down the neighbor's dog, which has absconded with the errant digit, Carol eventually recovers it, But as the couple races to the hospital to have the finger reattached, Carol discovers that Glenn has been unfaithful. Indignant, she decides that she is not giving it back until Glenn confesses to the identity of his affair. After much hemming and hawing, Glenn eventually acknowledges that it is Pam (Cynthia Watros), who also just happens to be Carol's best friend. Incensed, Carol drives to Pam's house to confront her, only to raise the ire of Pam's husband, Nick (Michael Rispoli), who grabs the finger and runs off, planning to put it into a bank deposit machine.

== Cast ==
- Liev Schreiber as Glenn
- Caroleen Feeney as Carol
- Michael Rispoli as Nick
- Cynthia Watros as Pam
- Danny Hoch as Lenny
- N'Bushe Wright as Selena
- Joe Lisi as Captain Barillo
- Jodi Long as Corey Chang
- Jim Bracchitta as Chad Williamson
- David Warren Burke as Lt. Riley
- Gregory Burke as Lawn Mowing Kid
- John Callahan as Scott
- Ranjit Chowdhry as Taxi Driver
- Kathleen Claypool as Mrs. Kalinsky
- Sandra Holley as Physician's Assistant
- Steven Randazzo as Security Guard
- Joel Rooks as Bank Manager
- Hal Salwen as Pinky Surgeon

== Reception ==
=== Critical response ===
Film critic Emanuel Levy of Variety wrote in his review:"Hal Salwen’s His and Hers, a screwball comedy about marital squabbling, is a disappointing follow-up to his charming, critically acclaimed debut, Denise Calls Up."
