= Manneken Pis (film) =

- Directed by: Frank Van Passel
- Written by: Christophe Dirickx
- Produced by: Dirk Impens; Rudy Verzyck
- Cinematography: Jan Vancaillie
- Edited by: Karin Vaerenberg
- Music by: Noordkaap
- Release date: 8 November 1995
- Running time: 89 minutes
- Country: Belgium
- Language: Dutch

Manneken Pis is a 1995 Belgian comedy-drama film directed by Frank Van Passel and written by Christophe Dirickx. It premiered in May 1995 at the Cannes Film Festival. It received the André Cavens Award for Best Film and four awards at the Joseph Plateau Awards. The film was selected as the Belgian entry for the Best Foreign Language Film at the 68th Academy Awards, but was not accepted as a nominee.

== Plot ==
Every morning in Brussels, the orphan Harry, to go to wash the dishes, takes the tram driven by Jeanne who, by chance, lives in the same building: she is extroverted and cheerful, he is shy and clumsy, with a trauma behind him that prevents him from saying "I love you".

They attract and repel each other, dragged by a feeling that goes beyond everyday life, but drama is always lurking.

== Cast ==
- Frank Vercruyssen as Harry
- Antje de Boeck as Jeanne
- Ann Petersen as Denise
- Wim Opbrouck as Desire

== Awards and nominations ==
- 1995 Cannes Film Festival
  - Winner Award of the Youth - Best Foreign Film
  - Winner Mercedes-Benz Award
  - Winner Grand Golden Rail
- 1995 Joseph Plateau Awards
  - Winner Best Belgian Film
  - Winner Best Belgian Actor: Frank Vercruyssen
  - Winner Best Belgian Actress: Antje de Boeck
  - Winner Best Belgian Director: Frank Van Passel
- Brussels International Film Festival
  - Winner Best Belgian Film (1996)
- Belgian Film Critics Association
  - Winner André Cavens Award: Best Film (1995)
- 1995 Montréal World Film Festival
  - Winner First Film Prize (1995)
  - Winner FIPRESCI Prize (1995)
- 1995 Valladolid International Film Festival
  - Winner Best actress: Antje de Boeck (1995)
  - Best film nomination (1995)
- Chicago International Film Festival
  - Winner Special Jury Prize, Director: Frank van Passel (1995)
  - Winner Gold Plaque: Best Film (1996)
- Changchun Film Festival
  - Winner Golden Deer (1996)
- Yubari International Fantastic Film Festival
  - Winner Special Jury Prize: Frank Van Passel (1996)

== See also ==
- List of Belgian submissions for the Academy Award for Best Foreign Language Film
- List of submissions to the 68th Academy Awards for Best Foreign Language Film
- Manneken Pis, statue
