= Pigalle (film) =

- Directed by: Karim Dridi
- Written by: Karim Dridi
- Produced by: Romain Brémond; Patrice Haddad
- Starring: Véra Briole; Francis Renaud
- Cinematography: John Mathieson
- Edited by: Lise Beaulieu
- Music by: Antidote; Alain Bashung
- Distributed by: Diaphana Films
- Release date: 1994
- Running time: 93 minutes
- Country: France
- Language: French

Pigalle is a 1994 French neo-noir film written and directed by Karim Dridi and starring Véra Briole and Francis Renaud.

The film was entered into the main competition at the 51st edition of the Venice Film Festival. It was also nominated at the 1996 César Awards for Best First Feature Film.

== Plot ==
The film is set in the Pigalle district of Paris, which is known for its dark and depraved underworld, with strip joints, peep shows, sex shops, drug dens and prostitution. Within this seedy district, rival drug dealers compete against each other, using others (like pawns) in dangerous battles. In one of these battles, is 'Divine' (Blanca Li), a transsexual and transvestite who performs in a nightclub. Her lover is 'Fifi' (Francis Renaud), who is a pickpocket and street hustler. He also flirts with 'Vera' (Véra Briole), who works as a striptease dancer and attraction at a peep show. She lives with 'Jesus le Gitan' (Patrick Chauvel), a career counselor and a small-time drug dealer. Divine is bullied to death, by a dwarf and large thug into giving some important information to one drug dealer 'Malfait' (Philippe Ambrosini). Jesus is then found next dead, decapitated in Vera's bed. Another rival drug dealer forces Véra to coerce Fifi into becoming a hitman.

== Cast ==
- Véra Briole as Véra
- Francis Renaud as Fifi
- Raymond Gil as Fernande
- Bobby Pacha as Le Pacha
- Blanca Li as Divine
- Philippe Ambrosini as Le Malfait
- Younesse Boudache as Mustaf
- Jean-Michel Fête as P'tit Fred
- Christian Saunier as Cri-Cri
- Christian Auger as René
- Olindo Cavadini as Polo
- Roger Desprez as Roger l'Elégant
- Patrick Chauvel as Le Gitan
- Jean-Claude Grenier as l'Empereur
- Jean-Jacques Jauffret as Marc-Antoine
- Jacky Baps as Forceps
- Philippe Nahon as Lezzi

== Reception ==
David Rooney of Variety (magazine) stated in 1994, that the film is "bruising but unexpectedly redemptive tract perhaps piles on one or two tragedies too many".
