= Noordkaap =

Belgian rock band

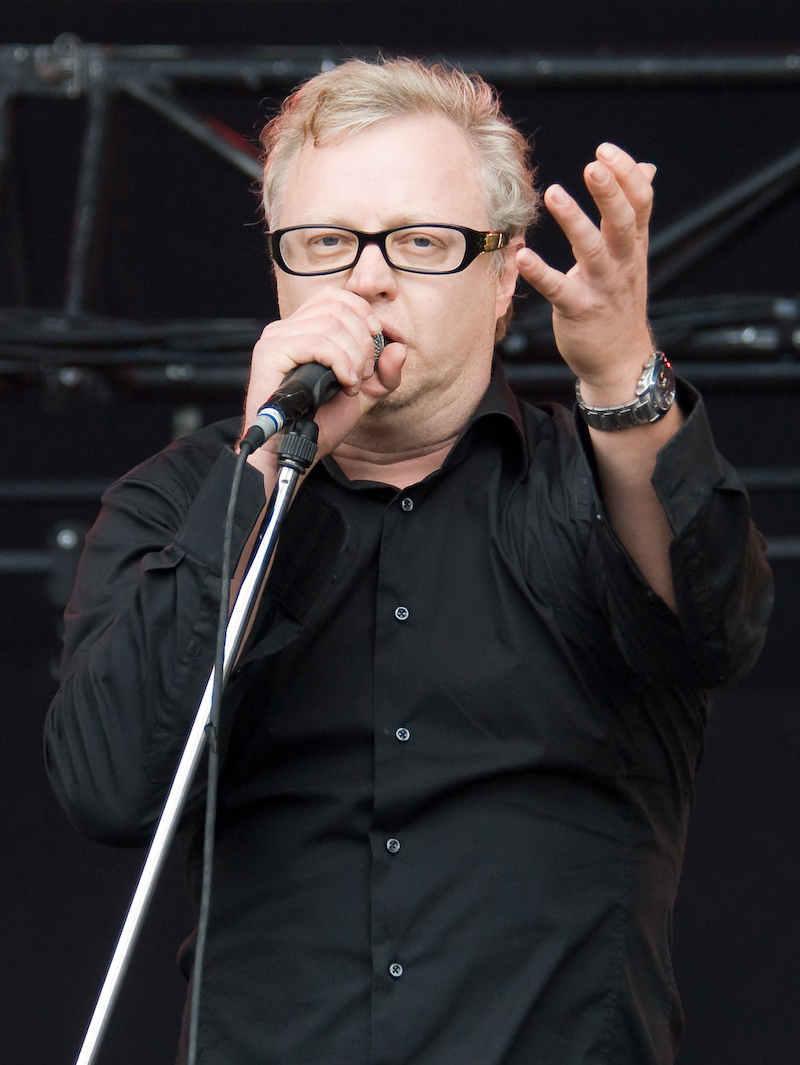
- Stijn Meuris - Member of Noordkaap (2006)

Background information
- Origin: Belgium
- Genres: Rock
- Years active: 1990–2000, 2019–
- Past members: Stijn Meuris; Lars Van Bambost; Eric Sterckx; Wim De Wilde; Nico Van Calster; Mario Goossens; Anton Janssens; Wladimir Geels; Alain Thijs; Stefan Vanduffel
- Website: noordkaap.live

Noordkaap is a Belgian rock band, led by singer Stijn Meuris. Their best-known songs include "Ik Hou Van U" and "Satelliet S.U.Z.Y."

== History ==
Noordkaap was founded in 1990 by Stijn Meuris, Lars Van Bambost, Erik Sterckx, Wim De Wilde, and Nico Van Calster. The band won Humo's Rock Rally in the same year.

The band released their debut album, Feest in de stad, in late 1991. In 1994, under a new record label, they released Gigant.

A year later Noordkaap made the soundtrack for the feature film Manneken Pis. The single "Ik hou van u" appeared in the charts for several weeks, and was re-released in a mix of French and Dutch to mark Belgium's 175th anniversary in 2005.

After releasing the soundtrack for Alles moet weg in 1996, several members left the group, leaving only Meuris and Van Bambost. The band returned in 1999 with new members Mario Goossens, Anton Janssens and Wladimir Geels, and the album Massis.

On 1 April 2000, Noordkaap played their final concert in the Ancienne Belgique in Brussels. Lars Van Bambost joined Novastar, and Stijn Meuris started a new band called Monza. After having a few hits in Flanders, Monza split in 2009 and Meuris continued as a solo artist.

Noordkaap announced their comeback in 2019, 19 years after their breakup, but due to the corona epidemic, the band had to postpone their extensive tour in Belgium and the Netherlands.

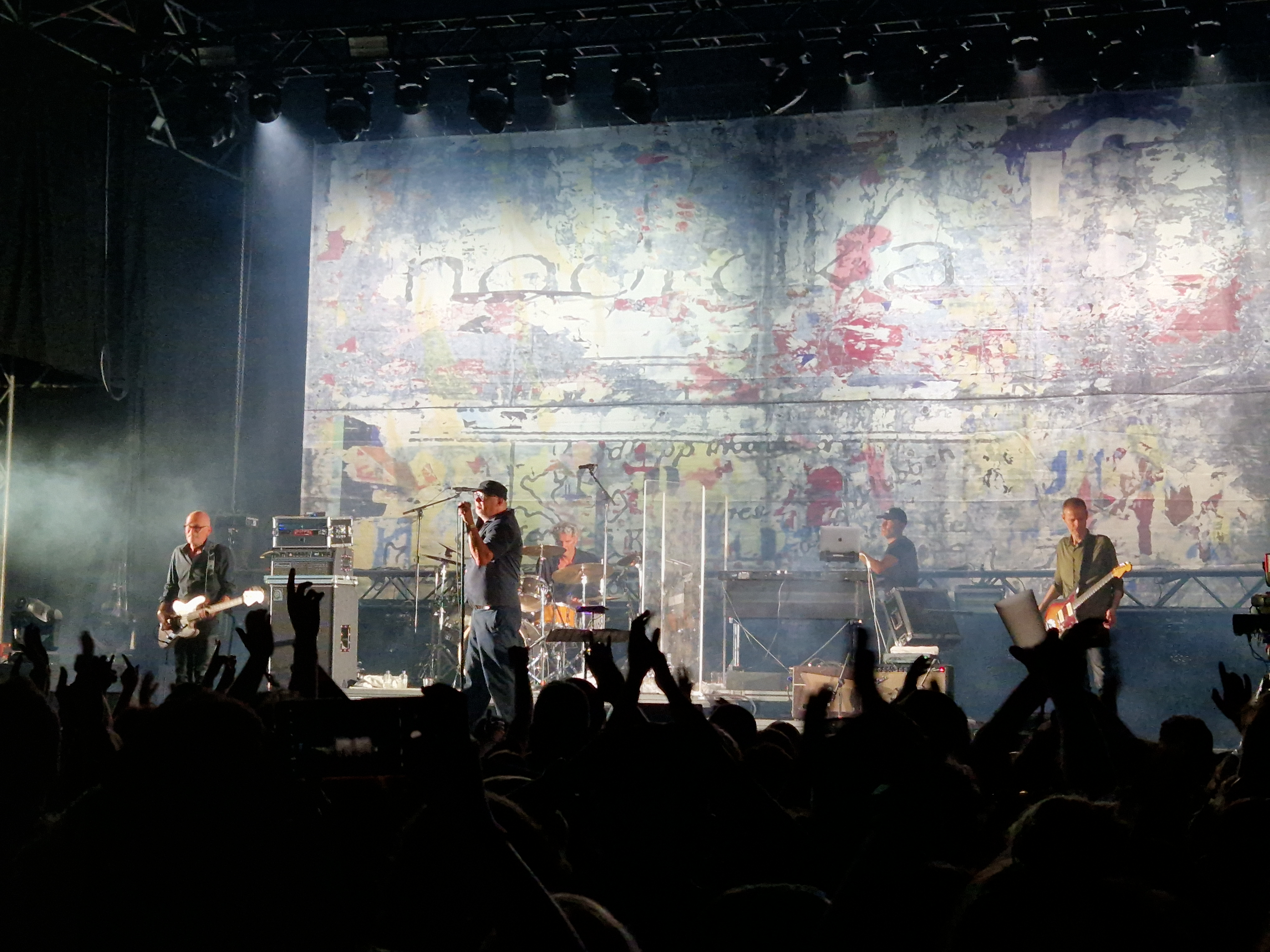
Noordkaap at Rock Zottegem 2023

== Members ==
- Stijn Meuris (singer)
- Lars Van Bambost (guitar)
- Erik Sterckx (bass)
- Wim De Wilde (keyboard)
- Nico Van Calster (drums)
- Mario Goossens
- Anton Janssens
- Wladimir Geels
- Alain Thijs
- Stefan Vanduffel

== Discography ==
- Feest in de stad, 1991
- Een heel klein beetje oorlog..., 1993
- Gigant, 1994
- Manneken Pis, 1995, soundtrack
- Programma '96, 1996
- Alles moet weg, 1996, soundtrack
- Massis, 1999
- Avanti!, 1999, compilation
