= Fresh (1994 film) =

1994 American crime film directed by Boaz Yakin

- Theatrical release poster
- Directed by: Boaz Yakin
- Written by: Boaz Yakin
- Produced by: Lawrence Bender; Randy Ostrow
- Starring: Sean Nelson; Giancarlo Esposito; Samuel L. Jackson; N'Bushe Wright
- Cinematography: Adam Holender
- Edited by: Dorian Harris
- Music by: Stewart Copeland
- Distributed by: Miramax Films
- Release date: August 19, 1994 (United States)
- Running time: 115 minutes
- Country: United States
- Language: English
- Budget: $3.5 million
- Box office: $8.1 million (US/Canada)

Fresh is a 1994 American independent crime drama film written and directed by Boaz Yakin in his directorial debut, and produced by Randy Ostrow and Lawrence Bender. It was scored by Stewart Copeland, a member of the Police. The story revolves around a preteen boy named Michael, nicknamed Fresh (portrayed by Sean Nelson), who runs drugs for gangsters. Inspired by the chess lessons of his father, an alcoholic speed-chess master (Samuel L. Jackson), Fresh devises and executes a brilliant plan to extricate himself and his drug-addicted sister (N'Bushe Wright) from their hopeless lives.

Marketed as a hip hop hood film, Fresh went relatively unnoticed by the public, but won critical acclaim. Critics praised the film for offering a realistic glimpse of life in New York City's public housing projects during the crack epidemic. "There's shocking resonance to the notion of a grade-school boy who's become a criminal out of sheer pragmatism", wrote Entertainment Weekly's Owen Gleiberman.

== Plot ==
Twelve-year-old Michael, nicknamed "Fresh", stops at a woman's apartment to pick a half brick of pre packaged heroin before he goes to school. Next, he visits another apartment where several women and one man, Herbie, are measuring and cutting bricks of heroin. Fresh meets up with another of his boss Esteban's employees to count the drugs.

Fresh arrives late at school, where he is scolded by his teacher. At recess, Fresh and his best friend, Chuckie, watch the girls' cheerleading team, and Fresh talks to one of the girls, Rosie. After school, he goes to his grandmother's house where his aunt and eleven cousins live.

The next day, Jake, one of the lookouts, threatens to kill Kermit, who didn't show up to pay the $50 he owes. Fresh seeks out Corky — his boss as well as Jake's — in order to get paid and demands more money since the lookouts make $50, while his pay is $100 for selling the drugs. Corky agrees.

Fresh takes the subway to Washington Square to play chess for cash with a man who is undefeated while his father Sam, a skilled chess player, watches. After winning, Fresh plays his father but loses. Fresh visits Chuckie, who proposes to enter their dog, Roscoe, in a dogfight to earn cash and urges Fresh to get him a job with Esteban. Fresh leaves him to visit Esteban, who is annoyed that Fresh is selling crack for other drug dealers. Fresh leaves Esteban to go to where his sister Nichole works. He bumps into James, Nichole's drug-dealing boyfriend. Fresh warns Nichole that Esteban is interested in her.

Fresh goes to watch a neighborhood basketball game, where Jake shows jealousy towards a smaller kid, Curtis. During the game, Curtis wins, and Jake kills him. Rosie is struck in the neck by a stray bullet and dies. The police arrive, demanding information that Fresh refuses to provide.

The next day, Fresh plays chess with his father Sam again and loses but puts his father's king in "check" for the first time. Later, Chuckie and Fresh arrive at the dogfight. Their dog Roscoe wins. Chuckie wants to enter him into another fight but Fresh stops him, agreeing to get him a job with Esteban. They go to Esteban's apartment where Esteban and Nichole are finishing having sex. Unimpressed with Chuckie, Esteban dismisses him and tells Fresh that he plans to groom him to be his protege and wants him to work for him only.

Meanwhile, Corky has had the police's attention since Jake's shooting. Fresh takes his savings to a cocaine source, Hector (Anthony Ruiz), under the pretense of being the runner for Corky. Hector refuses to hand over the drugs to Fresh. Fresh threatens him and offers him all of his savings. Hector takes the cash and tells Fresh where to pick up the drugs. Fresh says that the police have wire-tapped Corky's phone numbers and tells Hector not to call Corky.

After school, Chuckie and Fresh buy science textbooks to hide the drugs. They go to an abandoned house where Fresh is replacing their heroin stash with Hector's cocaine, while Chuckie keeps a lookout thinking he's just there to hide it. When they are leaving, three armed men arrive and kill Chuckie. Fresh is questioned by the police but is let go.

Back at home, Fresh's aunt tells him that she cannot risk the lives of her eleven other children for him and informs him that he will be sent to a group home. At school, Fresh's friends blame him for Chuckie's death and now truly alone, Fresh kills Roscoe. When he goes outside, Jake forces him into the car with the three assailants, revealing that Jake was behind the ambush on the kids. They bring Fresh to Corky, who is upset with Chuckie's bragging about moving cocaine for Esteban - the same drugs that Corky is selling - and that Esteban is encroaching on his product. The drugs that Jake and the assailants took from Chuckie's bag reveal that both Fresh and Chuckie were carrying crack cocaine.

Fresh lies, stating that he was being forced to sell for Jake. Corky's henchmen turn on Jake and his friend, Red. Fresh insists that Jake and Red were planning to oust Corky and he was only saying that he was selling for Esteban as protection. Fresh tells them to call Hector, who will reveal the truth. Corky calls Hector, who expresses concern over Corky's phone being wire-tapped, as Fresh told Hector. Corky then kills Red and Jake and asks who else is involved. Fresh names James.

Fresh then goes to Esteban's warehouse and tells him that Corky's crew had jumped him and that Corky is planning to sell heroin. He tells Esteban that Corky's distributor is James and the two are planning to meet that night. He adds that Nichole is seeing James secretly because James is plotting with Corky to kill Esteban. Corky and his men arrive at James' place and storm in while Esteban, Fresh, and two other men wait in Esteban's car. Inside, Esteban's crew kills James, Corky, and Corky's men.

Afterward, they drive to Esteban's place, and Esteban sees that Nichole is there. He tells his henchmen to take Fresh home. Fresh makes them stop the car and leaves. He runs into a convenience store and makes a phone call. He then shows up at Esteban's apartment. Esteban lets him stay because he wants to confront Fresh for telling Nichole that he found her father in Staten Island and for urging her to leave for rehab.

Angry, Esteban demands to know what else Fresh is hiding. The police arrive, and as Esteban answers the door, Fresh hides something under the bed. The police officer is Sgt. Perez, responding to a call about a domestic dispute, presumably the call Fresh made before he visited Esteban. Fresh tells Perez that Esteban is a drug dealer who killed James, Corky, and Corky's men, and his sister is scared to speak up since he is threatening her. Officer O'Toole checks under the bed and finds Esteban's gun, which he removed from the car after the shooting earlier, and the drugs Fresh planted. The police take Esteban away. Perez promises witness protection for Fresh and his sister.

The movie concludes with Fresh meeting his father again to play chess. His father berates him for being late, then looks up and sees Fresh sobbing.

== Cast ==
- Sean Nelson as Michael "Fresh"
- Giancarlo Esposito as Esteban
- Samuel L. Jackson as Sam
- N'Bushe Wright as Nichole
- Ron Brice as "Corky"
- Jean-Claude La Marre as Jake
- Jose Zuniga as Lieutenant Perez
- Luis Lantigua as Chuckie
- Yul Vazquez as "Chillie"
- Cheryl Freeman as Aunt Frances
- Anthony Thomas as "Red"
- Curtis McClarin as Darryl
- Charles Malik Whitfield as "Smokey"
- Victor Gonzalez as Herbie
- Guillermo Diaz as "Spike"
- Anthony Ruiz as Hector
- Natima Bradley as Rosie
- Elizabeth Rodriguez as Consuela
- Martin Shakar as Detective Abe Sharp

== Reception ==
Upon release, Fresh received critical acclaim. On Rotten Tomatoes the film has an approval rating of 88% based on reviews from 40 critics, with an average rating of 7.61/10. The site's consensus reads: "Well cast and sharply directed, Fresh serves as an attention-getting calling card for writer-director Boaz Yakin as well as a gripping urban drama." On Metacritic, the film has a score of 81 out of 100 based on 28 critics, indicating "universal acclaim".

Janet Maslin of The New York Times commended the "thoughtfulness of [Boaz] Yakin's direction" and wrote that he "doesn't include many violent episodes in this film, but the ones he stages are made so meaningful that their impact is brutalizingly intense." She complimented Adam Holender's cinematography and commented that he makes the film "extraordinarily handsome, with a sharply sunlit look that brings out the hard edges in its urban landscapes. The subject and visual style could not be more forcefully matched."

Although he did not find its second half believable, Owen Gleiberman of Entertainment Weekly gave the film a B rating and called Nelson a "wondrous young actor". James Berardinelli called Jackson's supporting role "an example of an actor at his most focused" and called Fresh "an atypical thriller -- a film that succeeds because it defies many conventions of its genre." Roger Ebert of the Chicago Sun-Times gave the film four out of four stars and called it "a movie filled with drama and excitement, unfolding a plot of brilliant complexity". He praised Nelson's performance as "extraordinary" and found its plot "focused and perceptive", praising it for its social commentary:

[V]iolent death is a fact of life in America today. Guns have made our cities unsafe for children. What Fresh does is bring a new perspective to those facts, in the form of both drama and thriller. This is not an action film, not a clever, superficial thriller, but a story of depth and power, in which the dangerous streets are seen through the eyes of a 12-year-old who reacts with the objectivity he has learned from chess, and the anger taught to him by his life.

Other reviews of the film are more critical, suggesting that the main character Fresh becomes less human, and more of a product of the screenwriters as the film progresses in its second half.

The film won the Filmmaker's Trophy at the 1994 Sundance Film Festival. In 1995, Nelson won the Best Debut Performance at the 10th Independent Spirit Awards.

Fresh had a limited release in the United States on four screens on August 24, 1994 before expanding on September 2 to 411 screens. Following the expansion it moved up to 11th at the US box office with a four-day Labor Day weekend gross of $2.9 million. It went on to gross $8.1 million in the United States and Canada.

== Year-end lists ==
- 3rd – Yardena Arar, Los Angeles Daily News
- 3rd – David Elliott, The San Diego Union-Tribune
- 6th – Roger Ebert, Chicago Sun Times
- 7th – Desson Howe, The Washington Post
- 9th – Steve Persall, St. Petersburg Times
- 9th – Sandi Davis, The Oklahoman
- Top 9 (not ranked) – Dan Webster, The Spokesman-Review
- Top 10 (not ranked) – George Meyer, The Ledger
- Best "sleepers" (not ranked) – Dennis King, Tulsa World
- Honorable mention – Michael MacCambridge, Austin American-Statesman
- Honorable mention – Howie Movshovitz, The Denver Post
- Honorable mention – Duane Dudek, Milwaukee Sentinel
- Honorable mention – Bob Carlton, The Birmingham News
- Honorable mention – Jeff Simon, The Buffalo News

== Soundtrack ==
A soundtrack album was released on August 30, 1994, by RCA Records. It featured three songs by the Wu-Tang Clan and nine songs by old school hip hop artists, including The Cold Crush Brothers, Whodini, and Grandmaster Flash and the Furious Five. Interestingly, given the movie's non-cliche nature, none of the songs were in the movie itself, at least not directly.

== Notes ==
The movie was distributed by Warner Bros. in countries like Sweden and distributed by Warner Home Video, on the home video releases, hence. The film had its behind-the-screens featurette on Cinemax on Beyond the Screen, in the early summer of 1994 hosted by Matt Lauer and many other hosts.

== See also ==
- List of hood films

== Bibliography ==
- Berry, Torriano; Berry, Venise T. (2007). Historical Dictionary of African American Cinema. Scarecrow Press. ISBN 978-0810855458.
- Seewood, Andre (2008). Slave Cinema: The Crisis of the African-American in Film. Xlibris Press. ISBN 9781436321792.
