= Khamsa (film) =

- Directed by: Karim Dridi
- Screenplay by: Karim Dridi
- Produced by: Mirak Films
- Starring: Marc Cortes, Raymond Adam, Tony Fourmann, Mehdi Laribi, Simon Abkarian
- Cinematography: Antoine Monod
- Edited by: Lise Beaulieu
- Music by: Joël Rangon
- Release date: 2008
- Running time: 108 minutes
- Countries: France; Germany; Tunisia

Khamsa is a 2008 drama by Karim Dridi.

== Synopsis ==
After fleeing from his foster family, Khamsa returns to the gypsy camp where he was born eleven years ago. With his cousin, Tony "The Midget", Khamsa dreams of getting rich with cock fights. Nothing seems to have changed since he left, the card games, the Mediterranean Sea... Until his best friend, Coyote, meets Rachitique, a small-time crook. Very soon they pass from stealing scooters to armed robbery, and Khamsa quickly spirals down into delinquency.

== Reception ==
The movie was critically acclaimed, the performance of non-professional actors was praised as particularly impressive.
