= ECupid =

American romantic comedy film directed by J.C. Calciano

eCupid
- Film festival poster
- Directed by: J.C. Calciano
- Written by: J.C. Calciano
- Produced by: J.C. Calciano; Joe Dain; Nicholas Downs; Matthew Solari
- Starring: Houston Rhines; Noah Schuffman; Morgan Fairchild
- Cinematography: Joshua W. Smith
- Edited by: Phillip Blackford
- Music by: Christopher Farrell
- Production company: Cinema 175
- Distributed by: TLA
- Release dates: May 23, 2011 (Inside Out Festival); May 5, 2012 (United States; DVD)
- Running time: 95 minutes
- Country: United States
- Language: English
- Budget: $2 million

eCupid is a 2011 American romantic comedy film directed by J. C. Calciano and starring Houston Rhines, Noah Schuffman and Morgan Fairchild. The title is a portmanteau of the names of dating websites eHarmony and OkCupid. The film found success at a variety of notable gay & lesbian film festivals including The 29th Los Angeles Gay & Lesbian Film Festival, The San Francisco Lesbian & Gay Film Festival (Frameline) and Newfest.

== Plot ==
Marshall Thomas (Houston Rhines), an advertising designer, and his partner of seven years, cafe owner Gabe Horton (Noah Schuffman), who live in Los Angeles, California, are in a rut. Gabe seems too busy for intimacy and Marshall is feeling the pressure of a frustrating dead-end job. Marshall discovers a smart phone application called eCupid and agrees to install it without reading the terms of agreement (despite multiple warnings.) The application (voiced by Morgan Fairchild) proceeds to take over Marshall's phone and computer, and by proxy his life. Gabe finds out and the two split. eCupid begins arranging various encounters and situations designed to help Marshall find the things he thinks he wants: the recapturing of his youth via fun, romance and freedom.

== Cast ==
- Houston Rhines as Marshall Thomas
- Noah Schuffman as Gabriel "Gabe" Horton
- Morgan Fairchild as Venus
- Mike C. Manning as Myles
- John Callahan as Mr. Hutchington
- Galen Drever as Dawson
- Matthew Scott Lewis as Keith
- Brad Pennington as Richard
- Gary Riotto as Carson
- Chris Rubeiz as Jimmy
- Andy Anderson as Chris 1
- Joe Komara as Chris 2
- George Gray as TV Announcer
- Matthew Gittelson as Customer
- Peter A. O'Riordan as Go Go dancer
- Scott Pretty as Party Goer (uncredited)

== Reception ==
=== Critical response ===
Robert Koehler of Variety gave the film a mixed review, noting that it would "find an edge in niche markets" but that it featured "uninspired writing (and) acting".
