= Lessons in the Language of Love =

1995 film

- Directed by: Scott Patterson
- Written by: John O'Brien
- Produced by: Scott Patterson
- Starring: Gabrielle Adkins
- Cinematography: Daniel Ardilley; Allen Koppe
- Edited by: Scott Patterson
- Release date: 1995
- Running time: 13 minutes
- Country: Australia
- Language: English

Lessons in the Language of Love is a 1995 Australian short film directed by Scott Patterson. It was screened in the Un Certain Regard section at the 1995 Cannes Film Festival.

== Cast ==
- Gabrielle Adkins as Sue
- Marianne Bryant as Lou
- Anni Finsterer as Nicki
- Alan Flower as Stinky
- Richard Roxburgh as Harry
