= Madonna's Pig =

- Film poster
- West Flemish: Het varken van Madonna
- Directed by: Frank Van Passel
- Starring: Kevin Janssens; Wine Dierickx
- Release date: 9 November 2011
- Running time: 109 minutes
- Country: Belgium
- Language: Dutch

Madonna's Pig (Dutch: Het varken van Madonna) is a 2011 Belgian fantasy film directed by Frank Van Passel.

== Cast ==
- Kevin Janssens as Tony Roozen
- Wine Dierickx as Maria Glorie
- Nico Sturm as Prosper
- Elise Bottu as Gusta
- Wim Opbrouck as Burgemeester
