= Villa des Roses =

2002 film by Frank Van Passel

- Theatrical release poster
- Directed by: Frank Van Passel
- Screenplay by: Christophe Dirickx
- Based on: Villa des Roses by Willem Elsschot
- Produced by: Dirk Impens; Rudy Verzyck
- Starring: Julie Delpy; Shaun Dingwall
- Cinematography: Jan Vancaillie
- Edited by: Ludo Troch; Karin Vaerenberg
- Music by: Paul M. van Brugge
- Production companies: Favourite Films; Dan Films; Isabella Films; Samsa Films
- Distributed by: Kinepolis Film Distribution (Belgium); Upstream Pictures (Netherlands); Miracle Communications (United Kingdom)
- Release dates: 27 February 2002 (Belgium); 17 April 2002 (Netherlands); 11 October 2002 (United Kingdom)
- Countries: Belgium; England; Netherlands; Luxembourg
- Languages: English; French

Villa des Roses is a 2002 film by Frank Van Passel, adapted from the 1913 novella by Belgian writer Willem Elsschot and starring Julie Delpy, Shaun Dingwall, Shirley Henderson, Timothy West, Harriet Walter and Albert Delpy. It won Best Feature at the Hollywood Film Festival and was nominated for three awards at the British Independent Film Awards.

Delpy plays Louise, a young widow who starts work just before the First World War as a maid at the dilapidated Villa des Roses, an English-owned guest house in Paris, where she falls in love with a German artist played by Dingwall.

== Cast ==
- Julie Delpy as Louise Créteur
- Shaun Dingwall as Richard Grünewald
- Harriet Walter as Olive Burrell
- Shirley Henderson as Ella
- Timothy West as Hugh Burrell
- Frank Vercruyssen as Aasgaard
- Toni Barry as Mrs. Bunny Wimhurst
- Jan Decleir as Monsieur Brizard
- Dora van der Groen as Mrs. Gendron
- Albert Delpy as Antoine Créteur
- Stéphane Excoffier as Jeanne de Keros
- Rifka Lodeizen as Radsky
- Halina Reijn as Natsje
- Maya van den Broecke as Anna Kuprinski
- Gary Whelan as Mr. O'Connor
- Alfredo Pea as Mr. Craxi
- John Dobrynine as Eustache Lejeune
