= Annie Dutton =

- Guiding Light character
- Portrayed by: Cynthia Watros (1994–1998); Signy Coleman (1998–2003)
- Duration: 1994–1999, 2003
- First appearance: November 29, 1994
- Last appearance: January 21, 2003
- Created by: Stephen Demorest
- Introduced by: Jill Farren Phelps (1994); Paul Rauch (1998); John Conboy (2003)
In-universe information
- Other names: Teri DeMarco
- Occupation: Nurse
- Husband: Eddie Banks (backstory); Rick Bauer (until 1995); Joshua Lewis (1996–97)

Annie Dutton is a fictional character in the CBS soap opera Guiding Light. Cynthia Watros is the actress most closely identified with the role; she played Annie from November 29, 1994, until February 23, 1998. The role was later recast, after Watros left for other career ventures, with Signy Coleman, who portrayed Annie from July 30, 1998, until July 20, 1999. Coleman also briefly reprised the role from January 14 to 21, 2003. Annie is often considered one of Guiding Light's greatest villains and one of its more exciting characters. Annie has also been the main rival to heroine Reva Shayne. The two have long fought over the affections of Reva's then-husband, Josh Lewis.

Watros won a Daytime Emmy in 1998 for Lead Actress in a Drama Series.

== Storylines ==
Annie Dutton came to Springfield from Chicago in November 1994 and began working as a nurse on staff at Cedars Hospital in Springfield. In January 1995, she began treating Joshua Lewis, who had broken his leg in the 5th Street fire, and the pair quickly fell in love. However, Annie had a secret: she was married to Rick Bauer. The marriage fell apart, however, because of Annie's alcoholism and her affair with a married man. Annie hid the secret from Josh and the two became engaged, but not long after, Annie told Josh her secrets. After initial resentment, Josh forgave Annie and the two married. Soon after, though, In April 1995, Josh's thought-to-be-dead wife, Reva Shayne was found to be alive and well, but Josh remained committed to Annie. The pair married legally and Reva married Buzz Cooper, because Josh's children wanted him to stay with Annie.

Annie knew that Josh was still in love with his ex-wife Reva and it infuriated her. Annie started drinking again and became addicted to painkillers. With Josh's help Annie entered rehab to get off the pills, which she did. She then began working as Alan Spaulding's physical therapist, who Alan grew to like, but Annie was still in love with Josh and was determined to keep him. She was so determined that she was artificially inseminated, but after a while Annie miscarried. Annie though had a plan, she picked a fight with Reva at the top of the stairs at the Spaulding mansion and made it look like Reva pushed her down the stairs and thus caused her to miscarry. Reva was then charged with murder, but during Reva's trial it was revealed by Annie's doctor that she was artificially inseminated and had miscarried the child before she had fallen down the stairs.

With Josh out of the picture Annie moved on with Alan, the two planned to marry, but Reva learned Annie was married to another man, Eddie Banks, from her days in Chicago. Eddie helped Annie steal drugs from the hospital where they worked when she lied to him about needing drugs to pay for her mother's operation. When they got caught, Annie faked her own death so Eddie would take the rap for the drug charge. He went to jail mourning the loss of his beloved Annie, but when he found out from Reva that she was still alive, he signed an affidavit stating the truth about Annie and their still-legal marriage. Just as Annie and Alan were about to marry Eddie entered and told everyone the truth, they were still married. Alan broke it off with Annie and she was then carted off to jail. Annie would escape but was soon thought to be dead by everyone after trying to kill Reva.

Annie was not dead after all and after a few months she returned to Springfield as Det. Teri DeMarco, to investigate a case there. Annie had plastic surgery to look like the real Teri, who was in a coma. Annie, as Teri, began drugging Josh, in hopes of getting him back. Reva meanwhile grew more suspicious about "Teri" and soon learned Teri was actually Annie Dutton. Annie after trying to kidnap Lizzie Spaulding fled town.

In 2003, Annie was found to be living in a mental institution believing that she was married to Josh and still hating Reva.
