= Duane Incarnate =

- Directed by: Hal Salwen
- Written by: Hal Salwen
- Produced by: Hal Salwen; Jonathan Shoemaker
- Starring: Crystal Bock; Caroleen Feeney; Kristen Johnston; Cynthia Watros; Danny Burstein; Jim Gaffigan; Peter Hermann
- Cinematography: Frank G. DeMarco
- Edited by: Jacob Craycroft
- Distributed by: Wellspring Media
- Release date: 2005
- Running time: 83 minutes
- Country: United States
- Language: English

Duane Incarnate is a 2004 American independent comedy film which premiered at the 2004 Tribeca Film Festival. It was written and directed by Hal Salwen and stars Crystal Bock, Danny Burstein, Caroleen Feeney, Jim Gaffigan, Peter Hermann and Kristen Johnston.

== Plot ==
Three women, Gwen (Caroleen Feeney), Fran (Kristen Johnston), and Connie (Cynthia Watros) are living happy, contented lives in New York City when one day, as they gather at their favorite watering hole, their sadsack loser of a friend, Wanda (Crystal Bock), arrives to announce that she's met the most spectacular man alive and that they are in love. Having heard this way too many times before to count, the women decide it's finally time to stop humoring Wanda and force her to face the grim reality of her life and the loser guys she always hooks up. Certain that Wanda's description of this new man is more than just a slight exaggeration, and skeptical that he even exists, the group challenges her to, this time, introduce the guy to them. At first, Wanda is indignant. How dare they doubt her? But after insisting that this new guy is much too busy to find the time, she finally succumbs to the dare and promises to deliver. The next day when Wanda's new boyfriend, Duane (Peter Hermann) unexpectedly shows up, the women are gobsmacked. Having expected the usual sorry shlub, Duane appears to be anything but. In fact, he appears to be strangely too perfect. Suspicious, the women begin to investigate, only to have strange things begin to occur as the investigation progresses. Increasingly frustrated, the group proceeds to do everything they can to break up the happy couple, only to see the world around them, if not the entire universe, start to come undone along the way.

== Cast ==
- Crystal Bock as Wanda
- Caroleen Feeney as Gwen
- Kristen Johnston as Fran
- Cynthia Watros as Connie
- Danny Burstein as George
- Jim Gaffigan as Bob
- Peter Hermann as Duane

== Reception ==
Janice Page at the Boston Globe wrote that "...The film is original, unpredictable, and deserving of the suspension of disbelief required to view it" while Variety's Ronnie Scheib was lukewarm, declaring "...Femmes turn in nicely differentiated, strong perfs... Nevertheless thesping, along with every other aspect of pic, seems stifled by the need to sync up to Salwen’s overriding high-concept premise rather than expanding or elaborating on it."

=== Awards ===
- Deauville Film Festival 2004 Nominated for Grand Special Prize
- Tribeca Film Festival 2004 Nominated for Jury Award, Best NY, NY Narrative

== Release ==
The film was released on DVD by Wellspring media in 2005.
