= Bo (film) =

2010 film

- Directed by: Hans Herbots
- Written by: Dirk Bracke; Nele Meirhaeghe; Christian Vervaet
- Produced by: Bert Hamelinck; Frank Van Passel
- Starring: Ella-June Henrard; Kalina Malehounova; Ina Geerts; Thomas Ryckewaert
- Edited by: Dieter Diependaele
- Music by: Senjan Jansen
- Release date: 10 February 2010
- Running time: 90 minutes
- Country: Belgium
- Language: Dutch

Bo is a 2010 Belgian film directed by Hans Herbots based on the novel Het engelenhuis by the Belgian author Dirk Bracke. It tells the story of a fifteen-year-old girl, Deborah (played by Ella-June Henrard), who, in an attempt to escape from the triviality of her life in the suburbs of Antwerp, becomes involved in high-end prostitution.

== Cast ==
- Ella-June Henrard : Deborah called Bo
- Ina Geerts : Chantal
- Kalina Malehounova : Jennifer
- Thomas Ryckewaert : Vincent
- Anemone Valcke : Yasmien
- Laura Ballyn : Steffie

== Production ==
Ella-June Henrard was 15/16 at the time of filming. Asked about how he handled the young actress sex scenes, director Hans Herbots said, "It was a matter of winning her trust. You achieve that by talking a lot and explaining. With me, it went fairly quickly, also because we offered the guarantee that she would not have to get fully naked. Furthermore, it is best not to plan any scenes that are too hot until the third or fourth week. And even then you can feel the nervousness that day. Not only Ella-June, I was also tense. Suppose she had completely shut down..."

== Awards ==
Giffoni Film Festival 2010:

- CIAL Aluminium Award
- Crystal Gryphon Award
- Award of province Salerno
