= N'Bushe Wright =

American actress

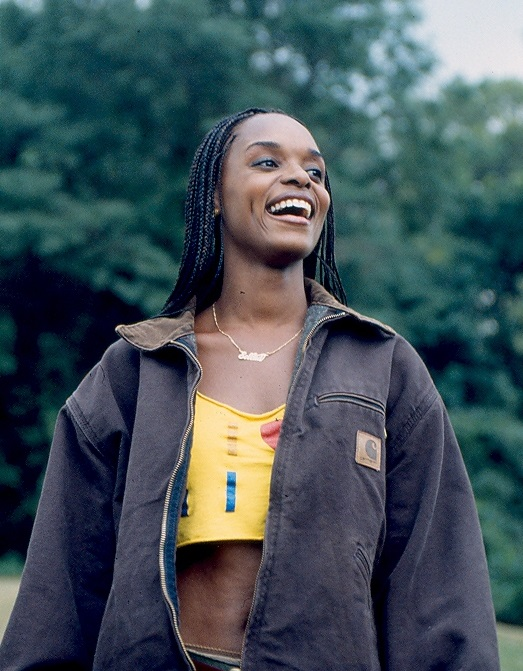
- Wright in the film His & Hers
- Born: September 7, 1969 (age 56); Brooklyn, New York, U.S.
- Education: Fiorello H. LaGuardia High School
- Occupations: Actress, dancer
- Years active: 1990–present

N'Bushe Wright (/ənˈbuːʃeɪ/ ən-BOO-shay; born September 7, 1969) is an American actress and dancer. She attended and trained as a dancer at the Alvin Ailey Dance Center and the Martha Graham School of Dance. She is known mainly for her roles as the drug-addicted older sister of twelve-year-old protagonist Michael in 1994's Fresh, and as Dr. Karen Jenson in the 1998 feature film Blade.

== Career ==
Within a year of attending Stella Adler's Studio, Wright was starring in Anthony Drazan's Zebrahead (1992). She received positive reviews for her portrayal of the drug-addicted older sister of the title protagonist in Boaz Yakin's Fresh (1994). The following year, Wright played an idealistic member of the Black Panther Party in the Hughes Brothers' feature film Dead Presidents (1995). Wright played Dr. Karen Jenson in Blade (1998).

In 1992, Wright played the recurring role of Claudia, a black civil rights activist fighting for equal opportunities in education in the acclaimed but short-lived NBC television drama I'll Fly Away. She has made guest appearances on several other television series, including New York Undercover, Homicide: Life on the Street, Chappelle's Show and Third Watch.

Wright also recorded a public service announcement for Deejay Ra's Hip-Hop Literacy campaign.

== Personal life ==
Wright attended the Manhattan High School for the Performing Arts. A native of Brooklyn, Wright's mother was a psychologist with the New York City Board of Education, who died in 2009 after 40+ years of marriage to Wright's father, jazz musician Stanley Wright a.k.a. Suleiman-Marim Wright, who was murdered in 2011.

== Filmography ==
=== Film and TV movies ===
Year	Title	Role	Notes
1992	Zebrahead	Nikki	
1994	Fresh	Nichole	
1995	Dead Presidents	Delilah Benson	
1996	Johns	X-Mas Junkie	
1997	Close to Danger	Detective Maggie Sinclair	TV movie
1997	His and Hers	Selena	
1997	Squeeze	Juliana	
1997	A Woman Like That	-	
1998	Blade	Dr. Karen Jenson	
2000	3 Strikes	Juanita	
2002	Civil Brand	Nikki Barnes	
2002	Eight Legged Freaks	Debra Griffith	
2004	Joy Road	Nia	
2004	He Say... She Say... But What Does GOD Say?	Alexandra Knight	Video
2005	God's Forgotten House	Ebony	
2006	Restraining Order	Carla	
2018	A Talent for Trouble	Marissa Montez	

=== Television ===
Year	Title	Role	Notes
1992–93	I'll Fly Away	Claudia Bishop	Recurring cast: season 2
1993	Homicide: Life on the Street	Loretta Kenyatta	Episode: "Night of the Dead Living"
1994	Lifestories: Families in Crisis	Laurette	Episode: "P.O.W.E.R.: The Eddie Matos Story"
1995	American Gothic	Cheryl Truelane	Episode: "Eye of the Beholder"
1996	Swift Justice	Sylvie Hodges	Episode: "Takin' Back the Street"
1996	New York Undercover	Carol	Recurring cast: season 2
1997	Subway Stories: Tales from the Underground	Young Girl	Episode: "The Red Shoes"
1999	Third Watch	Brenda	Episode: "History of the World"
2001	UC: Undercover	Keisha	Recurring cast
2002	Widows	Bella	Main cast
2003	Platinum	Maxine 'Max' Colt	Recurring cast
2004	Chappelle's Show	Calvin's Girlfriend	Episode: "Negrodamus & The Niggar Family"
