= Frank Van Passel =

Belgian film director and producer (born 1964)

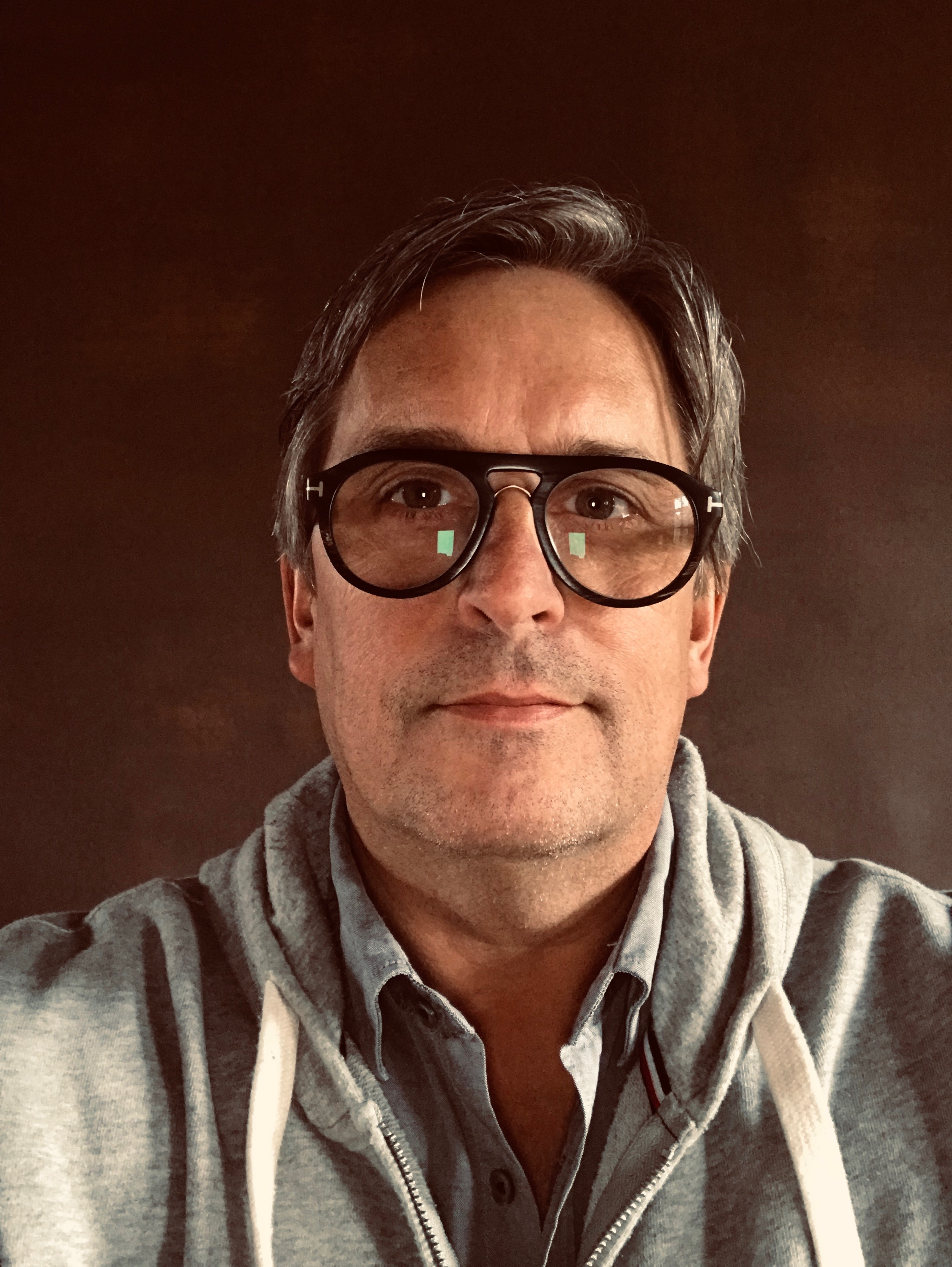
- Van Passel in April 2019
- Born: 23 June 1964 (age 62); Vilvoorde, Belgium
- Occupations: film director, film producer

Frank Van Passel (born 23 June 1964) is a Belgian film director and producer. In 1995, he made his directorial film debut with Manneken Pis, which premiered at the 1995 Cannes Film Festival and won the Mercedes-Benz Award, Grand Golden Rail, Award of the Youth and the Prix Guillermo del Toro . The film received the André Cavens Award for Best Film and four awards at the Joseph Plateau Awards. Van Passel's next film, Villa des Roses (2002), was adapted from the 1913 novella of the same name by Belgian writer Willem Elsschot. The film starred Julie Delpy, Shaun Dingwall and Shirley Henderson. It won Best Feature at the Hollywood Film Festival and was nominated for three awards at the British Independent Film Awards. His TV-series received numerous awards, including a Special Commendation Prix d'Europe and the FIPA D'OR Grand Prize in Biarritz for The Emperor of Taste and the TV-critics Award and De HA! van Humo for Terug naar Oosterdonk. He was co-founder of Caviar, a production company with offices in Brussels, Antwerp, Los Angeles, Paris, Amsterdam, London and Prague. Since 2018 he has been working as a freelance director, directing theatre and TV series such as Dag Sinterklaas (Ketnet) and Renaissances (TF1).

== Director ==
- Martha - 1985
- De Geur van Regen - 1988
- Ti Amo - 1989
- De Sikh-Story - 1992
- De Smeerlappen - 1993
- Bex & Blanche - 1993, TV series
- Kan dat met gebakken aardappeltjes? - 1993
- Manneken Pis - 1995
- Tales of a Liar (Terug naar Oosterdonk - 1997, TV miniseries
- Villa des Roses - 2001
- The Emperor of Taste (De Smaak van De Keyser) - 2009, TV series
- Madonna's Pig (Het varken van Madonna) - 2011
- Gestolen Jeugd - 2012
- Amateurs - 2014, TV series
- Vriendelijk Vuur - 2017
- Dag Sinterklaas - 2019, co-director with Stijn Coninx
- Renaissances - 2021
- Moresnet - 2024
- The Soundman (Radioman) - 2025
- Poes Poes Poes

== Producer ==
- Vele Hemels
- Sprakeloos
- Patrouille Linkeroever
- Le Tout Nouveau Testament aka The Brand New Testament
- Black
- Paradise Trips
- Terug naar morgen
- Tabula Rasa
- Amateurs
- Clan
- My Queen Karo
- Bedankt & Merci
- Bo
- Dennis van Rita
- Koning van de Wereld
- De Laatste Zomer
- Linkeroever
- Dirty Mind
- De Smaak van De Keyser
- Anneliezen
- Smoorverliefd
- Silent Stories
- Dikke Vrienden
