= Wine Dierickx =

Flemish actress

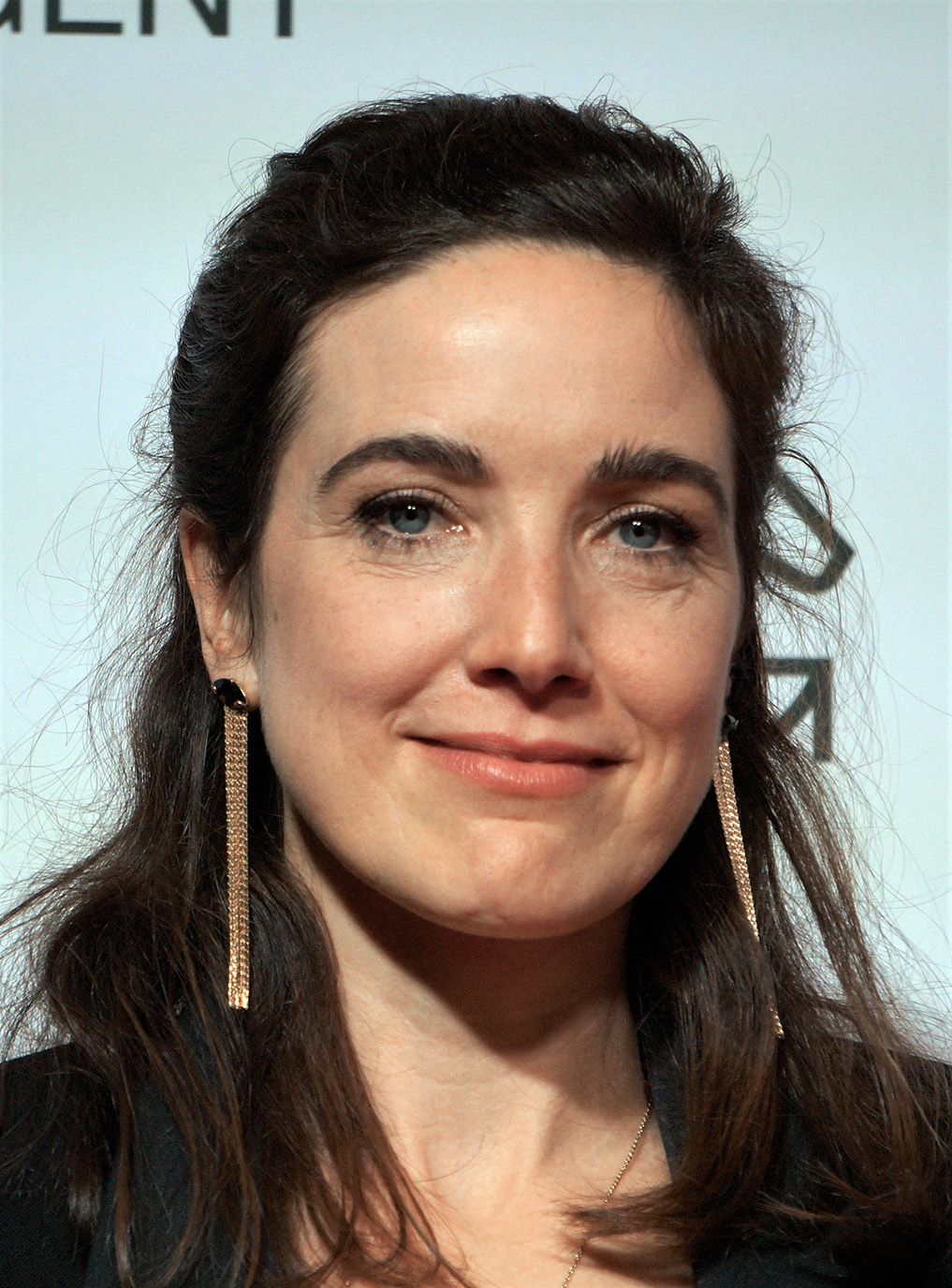
- Born: 1978 (age 47–48); Sint-Niklaas, Belgium
- Occupation: Actress
- Years active: 2002-present

Wine Dierickx (born 1978) is a Flemish actress. She is a member of the 2001 founded independent Dutch-Flemish theatre group Wunderbaum, that have performed shows in The Netherlands, Germany, Italy, United States, Iran, Scandinavia and Brazil. Dierickx also appeared in more than twenty films since 2002.

== Selected filmography ==
Year	Title	Role	Notes
2004	Steve + Sky	Nikita	
2008	Loft		
2011	Madonna's Pig	Marie Glorie	
2012	Code 37 (TV series)	Marie Delfosse	
2018	Professor T. (German TV series)	Residentie Zilverspar	
2021	Becoming Mona	Mona	
