= Cynthia Watros =

American actress

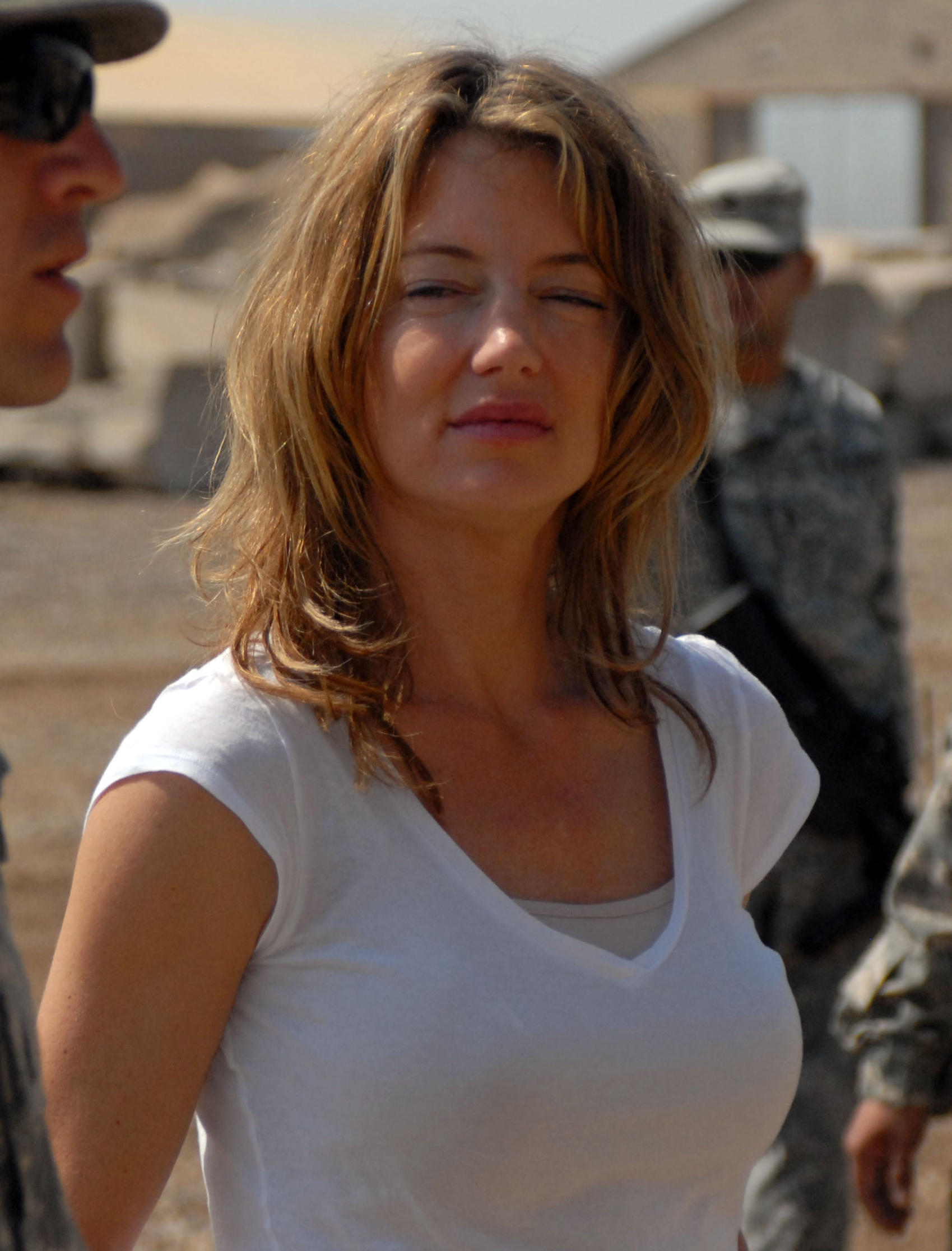
- Watros in 2008
- Born: Cynthia Michele Watros; Lake Orion, Michigan, U.S.
- Education: Macomb Community College; Boston University (BFA)
- Occupation: Actress
- Years active: 1994–present
- Spouse: Curtis Gilliland (m. 1996; div. 2020)
- Children: 2

Cynthia Michele Watros is an American actress recognized for her roles in both daytime and primetime television. In 1994, she was cast in the regular role of Annie Dutton on Guiding Light, which earned her the Daytime Emmy Award for Outstanding Lead Actress in a Drama Series in 1998. In 2002, she was cast as Kellie on The Drew Carey Show and in 2005 joined the cast of Lost as Libby Smith. Since 2019, Watros has portrayed the role of Nina Reeves on ABC's General Hospital, for which she earned further Daytime Emmy Award nominations.

== Early life ==
Watros was born in Lake Orion, Michigan. She attended Macomb Community College in Clinton Township, Michigan, and received a Bachelor of Fine Arts degree in theatre from Boston University, where she was part of the Professional Actors Training Program.

== Career ==
Watros initially became known for her role as Annie Dutton on the CBS soap opera Guiding Light from 1994 to 1998. Her character, a nurse, began as a heroine, but she gained notice and critical acclaim as her character gradually descended into madness. In 1998, Watros won the Daytime Emmy Award for Outstanding Lead Actress in a Drama Series for her role on Guiding Light. In 1998, she briefly filled in for Jensen Buchanan as Victoria Hudson McKinnon on Another World while Buchanan was on maternity leave.

Watros appeared as Erin Fitzpatrick on Titus from 2000 to 2002 and gained recognition as a comedic actress, playing the fiancée of the title character. According to the DVD commentary, Erin was intended to be neurotic and socially awkward, but the character was revised a week before the pilot was shot. After Titus was canceled, she took on the role of Kellie Newmark on The Drew Carey Show, as a replacement for Christa Miller. Watros played the role from 2002 to 2004.

From 2005 to 2006, Watros was a cast member on the ABC series Lost, playing psychologist Libby, a member of the "Tailies", a group of survivors of the plane crash who were in the tail section of the plane (and not seen during Season One). She was a romantic interest to Hurley and was very mysterious showing up in flashbacks.

After her departure from Lost in 2006, Watros filmed a pilot for a show titled My Ex-Life for CBS. She was slated to play the ex-wife of a character played by Tom Cavanagh. However, the pilot was not chosen by CBS. Watros was also the lead in the 2007 CBS television pilot for The Rich Inner Life of Penelope Cloud, a comedy about a former literary genius who, after an awakening, decides to pursue optimism instead of cynicism.

In 2009, Watros filmed a pilot for Valley Girls, a spin-off of the CW series Gossip Girl set in the 1980s, in which she played CeCe Rhodes, the socialite ex-wife of Rick Rhodes, and mother of the series' protagonists. In a May 2009 episode of the USA series In Plain Sight, "A Stand-Up Triple", she guest starred as a mother of three children in the witness protection program. Beginning in April 2010, Watros joined the cast of the TV medical drama House for seven episodes as Samantha Carr, one of Dr. James Wilson's ex-wives.

Watros appeared in the 2012 indie film, Electrick Children. In May 2012, she guest-starred in episode 8.22 of Grey's Anatomy. In June 2013, she guest-starred in episode 4.17 of Warehouse 13. She played Mary Matrix, coach of the FPS Varsity team in the online series Video Game High School. Her character first appears in season two of the series, which started July 2013. Watros starred as Avery Jenning's self-obsessed aunt in Dog with a Blog on December 6, 2013.

In 2013, Watros joined the cast of the CBS soap opera The Young and the Restless, but left the show in early 2014; the character was recast. In July 2014, she joined the cast of the MTV series Finding Carter.

In 2019, Watros joined the cast of General Hospital as Nina Reeves, taking over the role from actress Michelle Stafford, who departed the role to return to the CBS soap opera The Young and the Restless.

Watros also made a guest appearance in the digital drama series Misguided, playing a waitress named Anne, a nod to her role as Annie Dutton on Guiding Light.

== Personal life ==
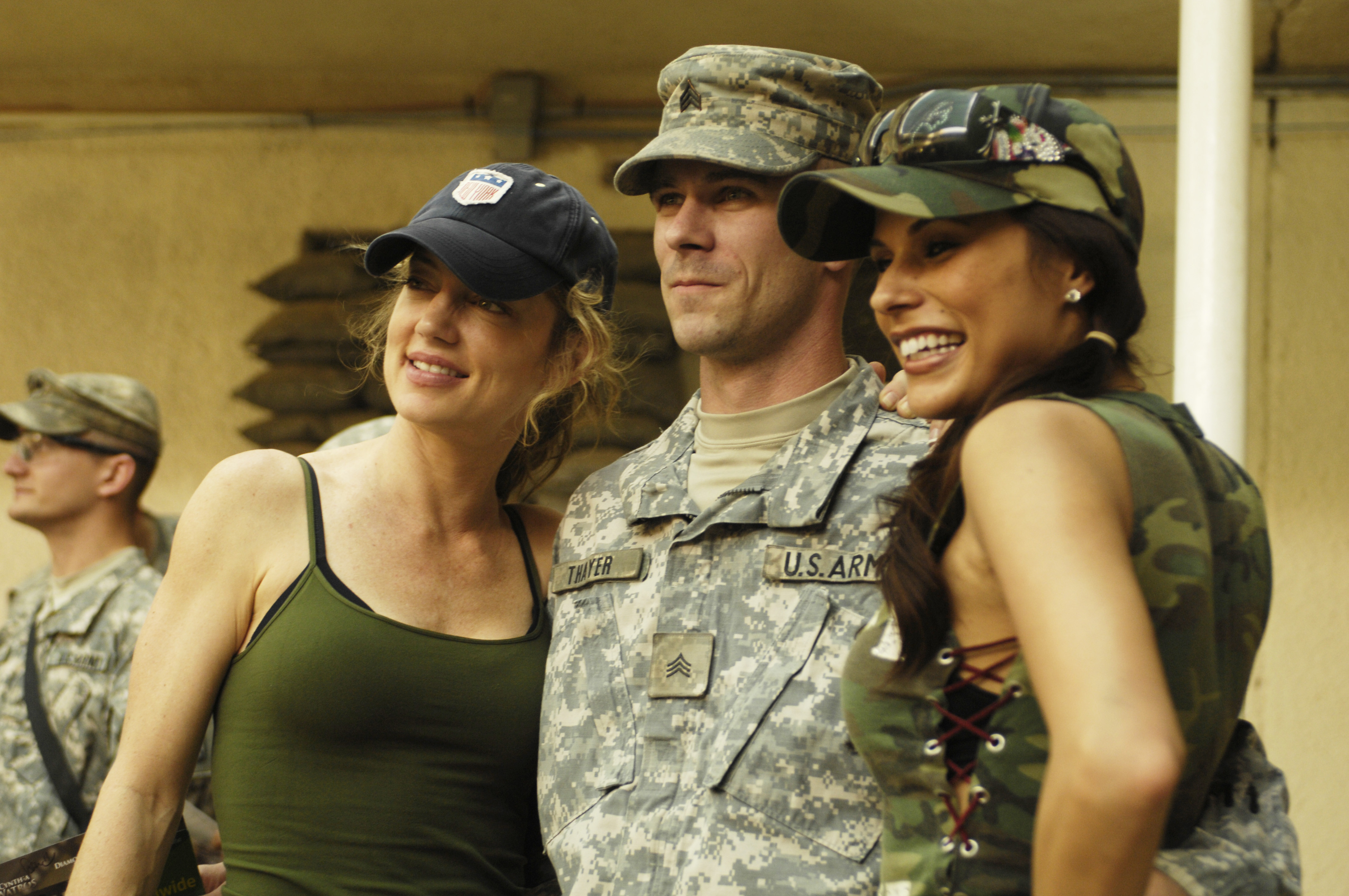
Watros and Bonnie-Jill Laflin posing with a serviceman on a USO tour

Watros was married to Curtis Gilliland from 1996 to 2020. They have twin daughters, born in 2001.

In 2005, Watros was arrested in Kailua for allegedly driving under the influence of an intoxicant.

In 2008, Watros participated in a USO tour to Iraq, visiting several bases, including COP Callahan in Baghdad's East Adamiyah area.

== Filmography ==
=== Film ===
Year	Title	Role	Notes
1995	Cafe Society	Dianna Harris	
1997	His & Hers	Pam	
1999	Blink of an Eye	—N/a	
2000	Mercy Streets	Sam	
2001	The Yellow Bird	Alma Tutwiler	Short film
2002	P.S. Your Cat Is Dead	Kate	
2004	Duane Incarnate	Connie	
2005	Just Pray	Perry Ann Lewis	Short film
2007	Frank	Jennifer York	
2008	American Crude	Jane	
2009	Calvin Marshall	Karen	
2010	Mars	Allison Guthrie	
2012	Electrick Children	Gay Lynn	
2013	Park City	Nina	
2014	Blood and Circumstance	Mrs. Stabler	
2017	Special Unit	Tara Small	
2017	Destruction: Los Angeles	Cathy Benson	
2017	Our Little Secret	Angela	

=== Television ===
Year	Title	Role	Notes
1994	New York Undercover	Reporter	Episode: "Missing"
1994–98	Guiding Light	Annie Dutton / Dee	Series regular
1997	Spin City	Gayley	Episode: "Striptease"
1998	Another World	Vicky Hudson	9 episodes
1998	Profiler	Helen Jefferies	Episode: "Perfect Helen"
2000–02, 2020	Titus	Erin Fitzpatrick	Main role, 54 episodes + 2 revival
2002	A Nero Wolfe Mystery	Phoebe Gunther	Episode: "The Silent Speaker"
2002–04	The Drew Carey Show	Kellie Newmark	Main role (Season 8–9), 52 episodes
2005	Washington Street	Maggie	Made-for-TV Movie
2005–07, 2010	Lost	Elizabeth "Libby" Smith	Main role (Season 2, "The End"); Guest star (Season 4, 6) - 24 episodes
2006	My Ex Life	Kate	Made-for-TV Movie
2007	Avenging Angel	Maggie	Made-for-TV Movie
2007	Raines	Sarah Carver	Episode: "Closure"
2007	Law & Order: Criminal Intent	Beth Hoyle	Episode: "Offense"
2007	The Rich Inner Life of Penelope Cloud	Eva	Made-for-TV Movie
2008	Fear Itself	Meredith Kane	Episode: "Spooked"
2008	Life Is Wild	Charlotte	Episode: "Rescue Me"
2008	The Bill Engvall Show	AJ	Episodes: "Susan's Best Friend"/"Bill Talks a Good Game"/"Snoop, Dog"
2009	Family Guy	Security System Voice	Episode: "Ocean's Three and a Half"
2009	In Plain Sight	Maureen Stewart / Maureen Sullivan	Episode: "A Stand-Up Triple"
2009	Gossip Girl	Young Celia Rhodes	Episode: "Valley Girls"
2009	CSI: Crime Scene Investigation	Barbie Aubrey	Episode: "All In"
2009	The Closer	Robin Milano	Episode: "Identity Theft"
2009	Criminal Minds	Heather Vanderwaal	Episode: "Reckoner"
2009	Men of a Certain Age	Erica	Episode: "Mind's Eye"
2010	The Secret Life of the American Teenager	Nicky	Episode: "The Second Time Around"
2010	House	Sam Carr	7 episodes
2010	Desperate Housewives	Tracy Miller	Episode: "Pleasant Little Kingdom"
2012	A Smile as Big as the Moon	Dr. Deborah Barnhart	Made-for-TV movie
2012	Grey's Anatomy	Liz Connor	Episode: "Let the Bad Times Roll"
2012	Hawaii Five-0	Katie Burgess	Episode: "Lana I Ka Moana"
2012	Retribution	Karen	Made-for-TV movie
2013	Warehouse 13	Janice Malloy	Episode: "What Matters Most"
2013	Cynthia Watros Gets Lost	As herself	4 pilot episodes on YouTube
2013	Dog with a Blog	Aunt Sigourney	Episode: "Twas the Flight Before Christmas"
2013–14	The Young and the Restless	Kelly Andrews	Recurring role
2013–14	Video Game High School	Mary Matrix	6 episodes
2014–15	Finding Carter	Elizabeth Wilson	Main role
2015	Stolen from the Suburbs	Katherine	Made-for-TV movie
2016	The Night Shift	Rebecca	Episode: "Three-Two-One"
2017	Deadly Exchange	Detective Hardy	Made-for-TV movie
2019	Misguided	Anne	2 Episodes
2019–present	General Hospital	Nina Reeves	Regular role

== Awards and nominations ==
Year	Award	Category	Work	Result	Ref.
1998	Daytime Emmy Award	Outstanding Lead Actress in a Drama Series	Guiding Light	Won	
1998	Soap Opera Digest Award	Outstanding Villainess in a Drama Series – Daytime	Guiding Light	Nominated	
2006	Screen Actors Guild Awards	Outstanding Performance by an Ensemble in a Drama Series	Lost	Won	
2020	Indie Series Award	Best Guest Actress - Drama	Misguided	Nominated	
2022	Daytime Emmy Award	Outstanding Lead Actress in a Drama Series	General Hospital	Nominated	
2024	Daytime Emmy Award	Outstanding Lead Actress in a Drama Series	General Hospital	Nominated	

First	Annie Dutton (role); 1994–98	Succeeded by Signy Coleman
Preceded by Michelle Stafford	Nina Reeves (role); 2019–present	Incumbent
