= The Monkey Kid =

- Theatrical poster
- Directed by: Wang Xiao-yen
- Written by: Wang Xiao-yen
- Produced by: Wei-Wei Wang
- Starring: Fu Di, Shu Fang
- Cinematography: Xiong Li
- Edited by: Wang Xiao-yen; Andy Martin; Yen Wang
- Music by: Jean-Pierre Tibi
- Release date: 1995
- Running time: 95 minutes
- Countries: China; United States
- Languages: Mandarin; English

The Monkey Kid (Chinese: 猴三儿) is a 1995 Chinese-American drama film directed by Wang Xiao-yen. The film concerns a child living through the Cultural Revolution. It was screened in the Un Certain Regard section at the 1995 Cannes Film Festival.

== Cast ==
- Fu Di as Shi-Wei
- Shu Fang as Mother
- Yang Guang as Xiao-Hua
- Lin Yang as Professor
- Chang Hung-mei as Xiao-Qing
- Yang Wang as Li-Li

== Filming ==
Prior to filming, Wang Xiao-yen proposed a script to the Chinese Censure Bureau. Following a review, the bureau instructed the director to remove a Mao quotation and inserting one of his poems. Despite doing so, Wang Xiao-yen failed to obtain official permission, resulting into a film that was made illegally. While in the early stages of production, Wang Xiao-yen and her husband hired children from an acting studio by contacting their parents outside the school. Prior to the film being smuggled by Xiao-yen and her family into the United States, she managed to edit it in China.

== Reception ==
Christopher Smith of the Bangor Daily News said that The Monkey Kid is a "must-see" film.

In a review for Variety magazine, Derek Elley wrote: "A neat idea gets a vigorous but incomplete workout in The Monkey Kid, a loose portrait of an ankle-biter's everyday life during the depths of the Cultural Revolution that has charm to spare. Though this feather-light indie production by California-based Xiao-yen Wang, based on her own childhood in Peking, has some darker resonances for those willing to dig for them, pic represents a marketing challenge beyond cable and other broadcast outings".

According to Julian Guthrie of the San Francisco Chronicle "The Monkey Kid is an unforgettable tale of a bright, enchanting young girl who grows up during the harsh era of Mao Zedong's Cultural Revolution".

Jay Carr of The Boston Globe praised the lead role by Fu Di, writing that "Fu Di devises ways of sliding out from under the death grip of the Revolution that will make you want to cheer".

Hubert Niogret said that the film is "[a] moving and sentimental chronicle of a distant childhood, The Monkey Kid is a short narration, produced with modest means, taking into account the difficulties that there are, today in China, to shoot a film in real settings on a time that we prefer to forget. Because the children are well photographed there, without tenderness or condescension, the film dispenses a certain charm, but the lightness of the historical analysis (wanted or obliged?)"

== Bibliography ==
- Andrew, Anita M. (2011). "The Monkey Kid: A Personal Glimpse into the Cultural Revolution". ASIANetwork Exchange. 18 (2). Open Library of Humanities: 108–111. doi:10.16995/ane.190. ISSN 1943-9946.
- Huot, Marie Claire (2000). China's New Cultural Scene: A Handbook of Changes. Durham, North Carolina: Duke University Press. pp. 65–67. ISBN 978-0-8223-2445-4.
- Reynaud, Bérénice (2005). "Wang Xiao-yen". In Davis, Edward L. (ed.). Encyclopedia of Contemporary Chinese Culture. Abingdon: Routledge. p. 65. ISBN 0-203-64506-5.
- "The Monkey Kid" (PDF). Boxoffice. September 1, 1995. Archived from the original (PDF) on July 12, 2021 – via ProQuest.
- Klein, Michael (May 3, 1996). "Get a close-up look at llamas and their tricks". The Philadelphia Inquirer. p. 181 – via Newspapers.com.
