= Becoming Mona =

2020 Dutch film

- Theatrical release poster
- Directed by: Sabine Lubbe Bakker; Niels van Koevorden
- Written by: Sabine Lubbe Bakker; Niels van Koevorden
- Produced by: Jeroen Bekker; Sabine Veenendaal
- Starring: Wine Dierickx; Valentijn Dhaenens
- Cinematography: Niels van Koevorden
- Edited by: Lot Rossmark
- Release date: September 26, 2020
- Running time: 93 minutes
- Countries: Belgium; Netherlands
- Language: Dutch

Becoming Mona (Dutch: Kom hier dat ik u kus) is a 2021 Belgian-Dutch drama film based on the bestselling novel by Griet Op De Beeck. The film premiered at the Seattle Film Festival where it won the Critics Prize. It also won the Grand Prix at the Molodist International Film Festival in Kyiv. It also played at the Chicago International Film Festival and at the Film Fest Gent In January 2021 it won an Ensor Award for best co-production.
