= Scott Patterson (director) =

Australian film director (born 1962)

- Born: 21 January 1962 (age 64); Crows Nest, Sydney, Australia
- Occupations: Film director, film editor
- Years active: 1988–current

Scott Patterson (born 21 January 1962) is an Australian film director and film editor.

Before moving towards directing and film producing, Patterson used to work for the Australian television production company, Ross Wood Productions. Patterson's debut feature film, A Wreck, A Tangle, received an Australian Film Institute Award nomination for 'Best Achievement in Sound' in 2000. It also won an Awgie Award from the Australian Writers' Guild in the category 'Feature Film – Original'.

His films have been screened at the Cannes Film Festival and Venice Film Festival, making him one of only a few Australian film directors to have films screened at both of these festivals. His short film Lessons in the Language of Love was screened in the Un Certain Regard section at the 1995 Cannes Film Festival. He edited TV commercials featuring Tina Turner from 1988-1995 before directing NRL TV commercials from 2005-2015. He also directed and edited his 1996 short film Pact which won the 'Premiere Award' at the Hamburg Short Film Festival. Pact also screened at the New Directors/New Films Festival at MOMA, New York, USA.

Patterson's 2004 feature film, The Crop, received the prize for 'Best International Feature Film' at the New York International Film Festival in 2005.

In 2019, Scott wrote a non-fiction book, The Oarsmen about the Australian diggers who won the King’s Cup for rowing at the 1919 Royal Henley Peace Regatta. The Oarsmen was shortlisted for the Prime Minister’s Literary Prize (Australian History) in 2020.

== Selected filmography ==
=== Director ===
- The Crop (2004) (feature film)
- The Birthday Party (2004) (short film)
- All Saints (2001–02) (TV series)
- Pact (2001) (short film)
- Shock Jock (2001) (TV series)
- Stingers (2000) (TV series)
- A Wreck, A Tangle (2000) (feature film)
- Fallen Angels (1997) (TV series)
- Eat My Shorts (1995) (TV series)
- Lessons in the Language of Love (1995) (short film)
- Hell's Half Hectare (1988) (short film)
