= Denise Calls Up =

- Directed by: Hal Salwen
- Written by: Hal Salwen
- Produced by: J. Todd Harris
- Starring: Tim Daly; Caroleen Feeney; Dan Gunther; Dana Wheeler-Nicholson; Liev Schreiber; Aida Turturro; Alanna Ubach; Jean La Marre; Mark Blum; Sylvia Miles
- Distributed by: Davis Entertainment; Rastar; Sony Pictures Classics
- Release dates: April 1995 (WorldFest-Houston); March 29, 1996 (United States)
- Running time: 80 minutes
- Language: English
- Box office: $148,121

Denise Calls Up is a 1995 American comedy film written and directed by Hal Salwen. It has an ensemble cast which includes Liev Schreiber, Timothy Daly, and Alanna Ubach. The plot revolves around a group of friends in New York City who, while working at their PCs and laptops and keeping in touch by phone and fax, never seem to be able to get together. The film won the Jury Prize at the Deauville American Film Festival and a Special Mention for the Camera d'Or at the Cannes Film Festival.

== Plot ==
Linda wakes up one morning to her ringing phone. Her friend, Gale wants to know how her party went last night. To her dismay, Linda tells her that no one showed up, "not a one." Thus begins Denise Calls Up, the story of seven friends living in New York City who no longer find it necessary to actually meet face to face due to the new age of the internet and wireless phones. But Gale is less upset about the absolute absenteeism, than about the fact that her friend Barbara never got to meet Jerry. Gale has been trying to set them up. So she calls Barbara, chastising her for not making it to Linda's and goading her into meeting Jerry. After protesting that she's just been too busy, Barbara eventually acquiesces. Meanwhile, Denise, who has gotten pregnant by an anonymous sperm insemination, locates the donor, Martin, and decides to call him. And so it goes, as the characters, via phone and fax, duck and miss each other time after time, using one excuse after the other to avoid meetings, births, and even a funeral until, finally, Frank, determined to finally get everyone together, plans a New Year's Eve party. All swear that they will be there.

== Cast ==
- Tim Daly as Frank Oliver
- Caroleen Feeney as Barbara Gorton
- Dan Gunther as Martin Weiner
- Dana Wheeler-Nicholson as Gale Donelly
- Liev Schreiber as Jerry Heckerman
  - Hal Salwen as young Jerry
- Aida Turturro as Linda
- Alanna Ubach as Denise Devaro
- Sylvia Miles as Sharon, Gale's Aunt
- Jean La Marre as Dalton Philips, cab driver
- Mark Blum as Dr. Brennan, Obstetrician

== Production ==
Hal Salwen allowed the actors to meet each other once before filming began, then had them shoot their phone scenes separately.

== Release ==
The film premiered at WorldFest-Houston in April 1995. It screened at the Cannes Film Festival Directors' Fortnight that May and played at Cinéfest Sudbury in September. It was given a limited theatrical release on March 29, 1996.

== Reception ==
Rotten Tomatoes gives the film a 72% rating based on 29 reviews.

Janet Maslin of The New York Times wrote: "Mr. Salwen's storytelling gambit may sound like a stunt, but he does a remarkably agile job of sustaining it throughout a sunny 80-minute comedy." The Washington Post was very positive, with Desson Thomson calling it "an amusing, soundbite-era satire about the dehumanizing link-up between deep human impulses (specifically love) and telephone/computer technology." He added, "What's funniest about the movie is the way information ricochets from person to person, through a combination of speed-dialing, conference calling and call waiting." Hal Hinson, also of The Post, called it a "stunning satire of yuppie life in Manhattan" and concluded "Salwen has captured and properly identified a very particular modern American species. His emergence as a filmmaker is a true event."

Owen Gleiberman of Entertainment Weekly gave the film a grade of C, but said he enjoyed the characters of Jerry and Barbara. In the San Francisco Examiner, Barbara Shulgasser said, "As witty as this film is, Salwen can't get around the fact that a movie about people who don't meet saddles a director with a lot of scenes focusing on one person talking to no one but a piece of machinery." Roger Ebert said the film’s idea was too slight for a full-length feature. In Variety, Emanuel Levy wrote, "At times, 'Denise Calls Up' feels like an overextended, one-joke movie, but the joke’s a good one."

== Awards ==
- Tied for Jury Prize at the Deauville American Film Festival with The Brothers McMullen
- Camera d'Or Special Mention at the 1995 Cannes Film Festival (the only American film to win an award at that year's competition)
