= Karim Dridi =

French film director and screenwriter (born 1961)

- Born: Tunis, Tunisia
- Occupations: Film director Screenwriter
- Years active: 1987-present

Karim Dridi is a French Tunisian prolific film director and screenwriter. He became known for his 1994 film Pigalle, followed in the following year by Bye-Bye.

== Early life ==
Karim Dridi was born in Tunis, in Tunisia.

== Career ==
Dridi emerged as a director when he was still a child. His debut short film was Dans le sac (1987). His next short, Zoé la boxeuse (1992) was selected for several film festivals and won at the Grenoble Outdoor Short Film Festival in Grenoble, France.

His 1994 debut feature film, the neo-noir Pigalle, was entered into the main competition at the 51st edition of the Venice Film Festival and was nominated for the César Award for Best Debut in 1996. His next film, Bye-Bye, was screened in the Un Certain Regard section at the 1995 Cannes Film Festival.

His 2000 musical road movie Cuba feliz was selected at the Directors' Fortnight in Cannes.

Antoine Raimbault's feature debut Conviction (2018) is based on Dridi's original idea.

His 2024 movie Lazy Girls won third prize in the main competition at the Bergamo Film Meeting 2025.

== Filmography ==
- Dans le sac (1987)
- Zoé la boxeuse (1992)
- Pigalle (1994)
- Bye-Bye (1995)
- Hors jeu (1998)
- Cuba feliz (2000)
- Fureur (2003)
- Gris blanc (2005)
- Khamsa (2008)
- The Last Flight (2009)
- Quatuor Galilee (2014)
- Chouf (2016)
- Hakawati (2019)
- Revivre (2023)
- Lazy Girls (2024)
