= Reunion Road Trip =

- Genre: Docuseries
- Country of origin: United States
- Original language: English

Production
- Executive producers: Greg Lipstone; Simon Knight; Adam Greener; Emily Mayer; Lauren Stevens
- Camera setup: Multi-camera
- Production companies: All3Media (Pilot); Studio Lambert (Event Series)

Original release
- Network: E!

Reunion Road Trip is a docuseries on the E! network that follows the reunions of various television casts, capturing their reflections on the iconic series that helped shape the television landscape. The show highlights the cast members as they reconnect, reminisce, and share behind-the-scenes stories.

The Jersey Shore reunion served as the pilot episode, premiering on August 20, 2017.

After 4 years in development hell, the show was announced to return as a four-episode event series on June 10, 2021. Amongst those reuniting are the casts of All My Children, the original Queer Eye for the Straight Guy, A Different World, and Scrubs.
