= Bye-Bye (film) =

1995 film

- Film poster
- Directed by: Karim Dridi
- Written by: Karim Dridi
- Produced by: Ilann Girard; Alain Rozanès
- Starring: Sami Bouajila
- Cinematography: John Mathieson
- Edited by: Lise Beaulieu
- Release date: May 1995
- Running time: 104 minutes
- Country: France
- Language: French

Bye-Bye is a 1995 French drama film directed by Karim Dridi. It was screened in the Un Certain Regard section at the 1995 Cannes Film Festival.

== Cast ==
- Sami Bouajila – Ismael
- Nozha Khouadra – Yasmine
- Philippe Ambrosini – Ludo
- Ouassini Embarek – Mouloud
- Sofiane Madjid Mammeri – Rhida (as Sofiane Mammeri)
- Jamila Darwich-Farah – La tante
- Benhaïssa Ahouari – L'oncle
- Moussa Maaskri – Renard
- Frédéric Andrau – Jacky
- Christian Mazucchini – Yvon
- Bernard Llopis – Popaul
- Marie Borowski – Bobo
- André Neyton – Marcel
- Emmanuel-Georges Delajoie – Mabrouk
- Bakhta Tayeb – La grand-mère
- Farida Melaab – Malika
