= Hal Salwen =

American film director

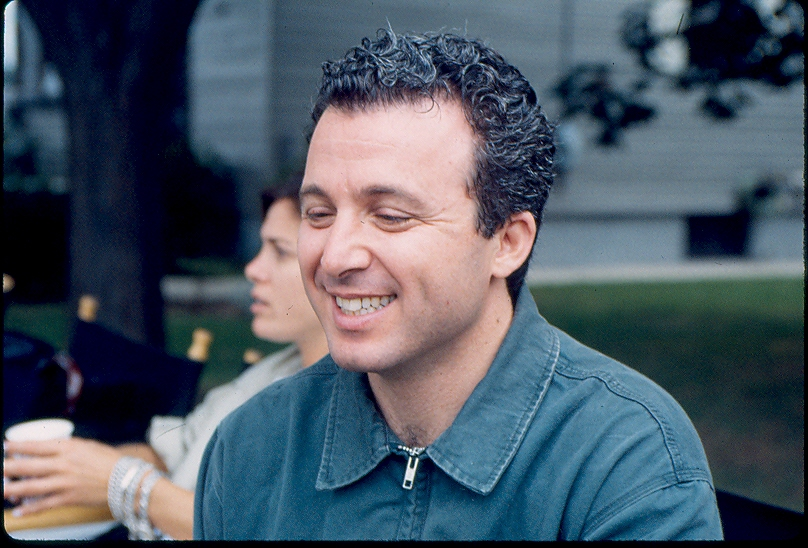
- Salwen in 1998
- Born: United States
- Education: New York University
- Occupations: Director, producer, writer

Hal Salwen is an American film director, producer, and writer. His films have received numerous awards and nominations, with Denise Calls Up notable for being the only American film to win an award at the 1995 Cannes Film Festival. With the premiere of his second film, "His & Hers", at the 1997 Sundance Film Festival, Salwen was named by Daily Variety as one of its "Top Ten Filmmakers To Watch" along with Mary Harron, Wes Anderson, and Alfonso Cuaron, among others.

== Biography ==
Based on a short student film, The Telephone, which he made while attending NYU Film School, Salwen was accepted into the American Film Institute's Director's Internship Program under the co-sponsorship of The American Academy of Motion Picture Arts and Sciences where he was placed to observe Sylvester Stallone direct Staying Alive. Following that experience (which he said did not heavily influence his directing style) Salwen began a career in television commercials in New York City, working in various capacities, from production assistant to producer, while simultaneously writing original screenplays on spec.

Although two of those scripts—Deadly Surveillance and Probable Cause—eventually found their way into production as made-for-cable movies for the Showtime Network, many remained unproduced. One in particular, Girls Talk, about three girls sharing an apartment in NYC that get an anonymous phone message from a woman claiming to be seeing one of their boyfriends, was optioned to Disney in a six-figure deal and later referenced in John Gregory Dunne's book, Monster: Living Off The Big Screen, as being among several projects Dunne had been offered to rewrite. This is of note as Salwen's first feature film, Denise Calls Up (along with the subject of his first student short) also deals with the results of technological interference on human relationships. Salwen explained how he came up with the idea:

"Denise Calls Up came to me during a time when I was frantically writing screenplays on spec—and anybody who has ever done it knows how tough and how isolating it is to be a freelancer. Now and then, I would call and talk to an old friend of mine over the phone as a break when my fingers would get tired. We'd talk about everything that had been going on in his life—he'd been in love, out of love, he'd changed careers, gone back to school—and then one day I was invited to a party in Brooklyn. When we finally met, I realized I hadn't actually seen him in three years. I went home and started playing with the idea of what it would be like if all the major events in a particular group of friend's lives happened between people who never met."

It took Salwen approximately three-and-a-half years to get Denise Calls Up made. The film was critically acclaimed in the US where it was picked up for distribution by Sony Pictures Classics, as well as Internationally where it was distributed by Alliance International to more than twenty countries. It was financially successful in many foreign territories, particularly in France, but was a box office disappointment in the U.S.

In 1997 Salwen was named by Daily Variety as one of its "Top Ten Filmmakers To Watch" along with Mary Harron, Wes Anderson and Alfonso Cuaron, among others. Salwen's films have received numerous awards and nominations, with His and Hers (1997), premiering at the Sundance Film Festival, and Duane Incarnate premiering at the Tribeca Film Festival, as well as the Deauville Film Festival where it was nominated for the Grand Special Prize. Denise Calls Up was nominated for eight awards across five international film festivals, winning six, and notable for being the only American film to win an award at the 1995 Cannes Film Festival.

== Films ==
- Deadly Surveillance (1991) (TV Movie, as co-writer only)
- Probable Cause (1994) (TV Movie, writer only)
- Denise Calls Up (1995)
- His & Hers (1997)
- Duane Incarnate (2008)
