= Chocolate Jesus =

Chocolate sculptures by Richard Manderson

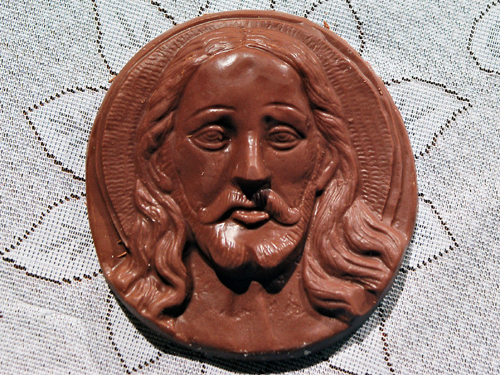
A chocolate relief of Head of Jesus.

Chocolate Jesus is the common name of chocolate sculptures by Richard Manderson in 1994, who called it Trans-substantiation 2; by George Heslop in 2006 who called his work Jesus on the Cross; and a third one by Cosimo Cavallaro in 2007 he called My Sweet Lord. It has also been used in literature and song.

== 1994: Richard Manderson's works ==
In 1991, Richard Manderson created a series of small raspberry fondant filled chocolate Jesuses, named "Sweet Jesus" that were sold for consumption to visitors of Gorman House Arts Centre in Canberra, an Australian cultural centre and heritage site that runs theatres, workshops, exhibition space, artists' studios, offices and a café.

When a US newspaper condemned his act of depicting Jesus on a chocolate, Manderson decided in answer to create an actual life-size chocolate Jesus he called Trans-substantiation 2. He did so by filling a plaster mold with fifty-five pounds (25kg) of melted chocolate. He used chocolate-dipped strings for hair and plastic Easter wrap for a loincloth. Manderson's work was exhibited in the public window of a civic building belonging to the Nolan Gallery for Easter in 1994, with Manderson inviting the public to come and eat his chocolate Jesus work after the exhibition.

== 2006: George Heslop's work ==
George Heslop, an English artist created the Jesus Crucifixion scene made of chocolate. His work was displayed in April 2006 in Bradford-on-Avon in Wiltshire as part of Ale and Porter gallery’s Chocolate exhibition. The exhibition also included chocolate reproductions of Michelangelo's David and Dalí's Venus. Heslop said he wanted to draw attention to the practice of "retail opportunism" that takes place during Easter.

== 2007: Cosimo Cavallaro's work ==
Cosimo Cavallaro's created an initial chocolate Jesus. But the work was damaged by rodents incidental to its storage in Brooklyn. Subsequently, he recreated in 2007 a work called My Sweet Lord for a Holy Week display at the Lab Gallery at the Roger Smith Hotel in Manhattan. His sculpture displayed an 'anatomically correct' Jesus with full frontal nudity in a crucifixion position, and with no artistic loincloth covering Jesus' private parts.

The planned exhibition resulted in many protests. In a famous confrontation between the artist and Bill Donohue, the president of the Catholic League commenting during a CNN show hosted by Anderson Cooper that Cavallaro's work was "one of the worst assaults on Christian sensibilities ever". The Catholic League also called it "hate speech". After Cacallaro received many objections and threats, and the Catholic League asked for boycotting the Roger Smith Hotel, Cavallaro decided to call off the controversial exhibition.

== In literature and music ==
- In 1997, author Stephen Jaramillo, published his fiction book Chocolate Jesus on Berkley Books. The plot revolves around Sydney Corbet, selling his idea for a chocolate Jesus to a candy company to pay off a gambling debt, but then is forced to reckon with stiff opposition and a crusade against the candy company.
- In 1999, Tom Waits recorded the song "Chocolate Jesus" that appeared on his album Mule Variations. It was co-written by Tom Waits and Kathleen Brennan. The song has been covered by a number of other recording artists.
- In 2010, Thomas Quinn described his encounter with a chocolate Jesus that led him to a spiritual questioning of Christian beliefs in What Do You Do with a Chocolate Jesus? An Irreverent History of Christianity published by BookSurge.

== See also ==
- List of statues of Jesus

== Notes ==
- The Jesus Question: A Brief History of Chocolate Jesus
