= John Santerineross =

American artist (born 1955)

John Santerineross (born 1955) is an American artist known for dark, often erotic imagery. In 2006, he had a solo exhibition at KFMK Gallery in New York City that garnered international attention.

John Santerineross was born in 1955 in the Bronx. He started his artistic career working as a ceramist from 1979 to 1989. In 1989, he helped form Artfux, a group which described itself as a "guerilla art group." The group's most famous antic was "The Trial of Sen. Jesse Helms" in 1990. In 1994, Santerineross began photographing professionally and his first book, Fruit of the Secret God, was released in 1999. Dream followed in 2004. Critical response to Santerineross's work has been mixed. Peter Marshall of about.com found Santerineross's photographs to be "initially impressive, but [with] a repetitive quality in its symbolism and manufactured mood that palled after a while." In contrast, PROFIFITO magazine called him "one of the world's leading neo-symbolist photographers of our time."

John Santerineross is mentioned extensively in Catholic League President Bill Donohue’s 2009 book entitled “Secular Sabotage: How Liberals Are Destroying Religion and Culture in America” (ISBN 978-0446547215) along with several other groundbreaking artists including Andres Serrano and Robert Mapplethorpe in Chapter 4: Artistic Sabotage. Donohue states:

In 2006 at KFMK Gallery in New York City, an exhibit of the work of John Santerineross featured a photo of a woman with her genitals cut and bleeding; a crucifix was placed below the woman, and the blood from her mutilated genitalia was shown running into a wine glass. Just so we got the point, the photo was dubbed “The Transformation of the Madonna”. These artistic assassins want to artistically assassinate Christianity, especially Catholicism. They are not artists who are simply making a statement. They are nihilists. Not to understand the difference between artists who protest Christianity’s teachings on sexuality, and moral anarchists out to sabotage Christianity altogether, is not only to miss what is at stake, it does an injustice to their work.”
