= Cosimo Cavallaro =

Italian-Canadian artist and filmmaker

Cosimo Cavallaro (born 1961) is an Italian-Canadian artist, filmmaker, and sculptor. Born in Montreal, Quebec, Canada, Cavallaro is known for his numerous installation art pieces involving real cheese, including a performance with the iconic 1960s model Twiggy covered in Easy Cheese. In 1999, he created "Hotel Room 114", covering an entire New York City hotel room with 5,000 lbs of melted Swiss cheese. In 2001 "The Wyoming Cheese House", an installation in which a house was completely covered inside and out with 20,000 lbs of pepper jack cheese. In 2019, "THIS IS NOT A WALL", a large-scale installation consisting of a 75-foot-long, 6-foot-high wall made out of Cotija cheese along the American-Mexican border.

== My Sweet Lord ==
In March 2007, the Lab Gallery at the Roger Smith Hotel in Manhattan announced that it was canceling its planned "My Sweet Lord" exhibition scheduled for Holy Week because the hotel had received death threats following a radio broadcast by Bill Donohue of the Catholic League. "My Sweet Lord" is a life-size and anatomically correct depiction of Jesus—with neither cross nor loincloth—in an attitude of crucifixion, and sculpted entirely from chocolate.

The sculpture in question is a new version of the original "My Sweet Lord," formed from 200 pounds of chocolate which had been damaged by rodents while it was in storage in Brooklyn. Cavallaro discarded the original piece and recast the sculpture. The new work is intended to be displayed with a group of chocolate saints, including St. Francis; Augustine; Michael, Jude, Anthony and Fermin—all made by Cavallaro from sweet chocolate.

Bill Donohue was quoted as describing this as "one of the worst assaults on Christian sensibilities ever" and told Cavallaro in a live interview on CNN "you're lucky I'm not like the Taliban, because you would lose more than your head" . Donohue even accused him of lying about being a Roman Catholic, and even a Christian at all.

Cavallaro won the 1990 Juno Award for Best Music Video for his video for Boomtown, by Canadian singer-songwriter Andrew Cash. He lives in New York City.

== See also ==
- Angela Singer
- Chris Savido
- David Černý
- Piss Christ
