= The Sounding =

- Film poster
- Directed by: Catherine Eaton
- Screenplay by: Catherine Eaton; Bryan Delaney
- Produced by: Caitlin Gold; Jessica Vale; Bryan Delaney; Catherine Eaton; Aliki Paraschis; Veronique Huyghebaert
- Starring: Catherine Eaton
- Cinematography: David Kruta
- Edited by: Marco Perez
- Music by: Siddhartha Khosla
- Production companies: Rag and Bone Pictures; Tanbark Pictures
- Distributed by: Giant Pictures (Domestic); HBO Europe (International)
- Release dates: March 2017 (Cinequest); October 20, 2020; (Streaming)
- Running time: 93 minutes
- Country: United States
- Language: English

The Sounding is a 2017 American drama film co-written and directed by Catherine Eaton, based on her stage play Corsetless. The film premiered in competition at the 2017 Cinequest Film Festival, and went on to receive over two dozen awards and nominations on the festival circuit. The film was subsequently distributed by Giant Pictures and HBO Europe.

== Plot ==
Set on a remote island off the coast of Maine, the film follows Liv (Catherine Eaton), a woman who has remained silent her entire life, communicating through gestures and actions. She lives under the care of her grandfather, Lionel (Harris Yulin), a retired neuropsychiatrist who has protected her from societal interventions. Following Lionel's death, Liv begins to speak, but exclusively in phrases derived from William Shakespeare. This sudden change concerns Lionel's friend, Michael (Teddy Sears), a neuropsychiatrist who perceives Liv's behavior as symptomatic of a mental disorder. Despite earlier promises to Lionel to protect Liv's autonomy, Michael arranges for her involuntary commitment to a psychiatric hospital. Within the institution, Liv resists conformity, her rebellion highlighting the tension between individual expression and social expectation. The film explores themes of individuality, communication, and the complexities of societal norms, challenging perceptions of normalcy and the right to self-expression.

== Cast ==
- Catherine Eaton as Liv
- Teddy Sears as Michael
- Harris Yulin as Lionel
- Frankie Faison as Roland
- Erin Darke as Christine
- Lucy Owen as Joan
- Danny Burstein as Dr. Anderson
- David Furr as Ed Knott

== Development ==
The Sounding was developed from Eaton's one-woman play Corsetless, which tells the story of Liv, a brilliant yet misunderstood woman struggling for her freedom within a psychiatric institution. The play was first presented in 2006 with a staged reading at Lincoln Center Theatre, directed by Austin Pendleton. It was subsequently produced in 2007 by the Irish Classical Theatre in Buffalo, New York, directed by Derek Campbell. Corsetless later played a sold-out Carnegie Hall in 2008, accompanied by an original score from award-winning concert pianist, Elaine Kwon. Later that year the play had a ten venue national tour throughout Ireland.

In 2010 Eaton was approached by John Knowles about staging Corsetless as an installation piece in the glassed-in storefront space of the Roger Smith Hotel in Midtown Manhattan. Eaton was hesitant at first, later recalling “So initially I said No way, I’m not going to do that. It’s like being a monkey in a cage - you’re in Manhattan. You’re in a box and people are walking by - thousands of people an hour.” However, she was subsequently convinced, and one year later the installation became a cult hit, routinely drawing crowds large enough to create a public safety hazard. During this run of the play, Eaton recalled

Every night this man would come in a tuxedo that I thought was a caterer because I didn’t know anyone else who would wear a tuxedo every day. He would sometimes come alone and sometimes with his family and he always had a peach colored Financial Times under his arm, so the guys in the back jokingly called him “the Financier.” They’d say, “Oh. Has the Financier come tonight?” On the last night of the play he waited for me afterwards and said, “I want to turn your play into a feature film.” He became the first investor and literally changed my life.

Corsetless was subsequently re-worked into a 2015 short film, which served as a proof of concept for the 2017 feature length film. Eaton would document this incremental process from stage to screen in a panel at the 2016 SXSW Festival entitled “Through Our Eyes: Female Filmmakers Tell All.” In 2018 the making of The Sounding would become the subject of a branded mini-doc by Stella Artois entitled “The Art of Living: Catherine Eaton,” which aired on Hulu.

== Production ==
The Sounding was shot entirely on Monhegan Island, a small, rocky island ten miles off the coast of Maine.

The film's co-screenwriter, Bryan Delaney, appears twice in the film: first as a guest during the funeral scene, and again as one of the lobstermen who helps pull Liv from the water.

== Release ==
The Sounding was originally acquired by myCinema for North American theatrical release in nationwide, but was ultimately cancelled due to the 2020 COVID-19 pandemic.

The film was released via VOD on AppleTV and Amazon Prime Video in the United States, and via streaming on HBO Europe on October 20, 2020.

== Reception ==
The Sounding received mostly positive reviews from critics, with particular praise for Eaton's direction and performance. The film currently holds a 70% “Fresh” rating on the review aggregator Rotten Tomatoes and 62% on Metacritic, indicating “Generally Favorable Reception.” In a review for The Wall Street Journal, Pulitzer Prize winning film critic Joe Morgenstern observed

"Nothing is simple in this lyrical and audacious debut feature… Ms. Eaton’s dramatic imagination is strong, (her) appetite for philosophy is strong too. She wants us to see her heroine as a paradigm of independence, a creature apart, and not because of what seems at the outset to be a disability, or a communication disorder. Liv presents questions for which no answers are available—why she chooses to live as she does, if indeed she has made a choice; how she thinks; and who she actually is in the secret synapses of her mind."

Kate Erbland of IndieWire offered similar praise, noting “Rich in its execution and careful in its approach, The Sounding resonates.”

Frank Scheck of The Hollywood Reporter gave the film more mixed review, writing, "that the film proves intriguing despite its overly familiar themes is a testament to the acting more than the writing." He goes on to praise Eaton's "compelling, highly physical performance," while criticizing the scripts "contrived plot mechanics." Ultimately, Scheck asserts that the film might have worked better on stage. Tomris Laffly of RogerEbert.com offered an equally mixed review, noting “The Sounding impresses more with its majestic and ageless feel than its vague ideas around the human mind.”

== Awards ==
Year	Association	Category	Nominee	Result	Ref.
2016	Tribeca Film Institute	IWC Filmmaker Award	Catherine Eaton	Runner-up	
2017	Cinequest Film & Creativity Festival	Feature Film - Drama	Catherine Eaton	Nominated	
2017	Palm Beach International Film Festival	Jury Prize - Best Narrative Feature Film	Catherine Eaton	Won	
2017	Minneapolis–Saint Paul International Film Festival	Jury Prize - Best Narrative Feature Film	Catherine Eaton	Won	
2017	Minneapolis–Saint Paul International Film Festival	New American Visions Audience Award	Catherine Eaton	Won	
2017	Arizona International Film Festival	Grand Prize	Catherine Eaton	Won	
2017	Brooklyn Film Festival	Audience Choice - Best Narrative Feature Film	Catherine Eaton	Won	
2017	Brooklyn Film Festival	Best New Voice	Catherine Eaton	Won	
2017	Maine International Film Festival	Audience Choice - Best Film	Catherine Eaton	Won	
2017	Woods Hole Film Festival	Best Feature Drama	Catherine Eaton	Runner-up	
2017	Stony Brook Film Festival	Jury Prize - Best Narrative Feature Film	Catherine Eaton	Won	
2017	SAMHSA (Substance Abuse and Mental Health Services Administration)	Voice Award	Catherine Eaton	Nominated	
2017	Hell's Half Mile Film & Music Festival	Best Feature Film	Catherine Eaton	Nominated	
2017	Hell's Half Mile Film & Music Festival	Best Screenplay	Catherine Eaton & Bryan Delaney	Nominated	
2017	Hell's Half Mile Film & Music Festival	Best Actress	Catherine Eaton	Nominated	
2017	Buffalo International Film Festival	Best Feature	Catherine Eaton	Nominated	
2017	Woodstock Film Festival	Best Cinematography	David Kruta	Won	
2017	YES Film Festival	Grand Prize	Catherine Eaton	Won	
2017	Naples International Film Festival	Audience Choice - Best Film	Catherine Eaton	Won	
2017	Denver Film Festival	Women+Film, Best Feature Film	Catherine Eaton	Nominated	
2017	Napa Valley Film Festival	Best Actress	Catherine Eaton	Nominated	
2018	Oxford International Film Festival	Best Narrative Feature	Catherine Eaton	Won	
2018	Oxford International Film Festival	Lisa Blount Memorial Acting Award	Catherine Eaton	Won	
2018	Manchester Film Festival	Best Actress	Catherine Eaton	Won	
2018	Santa Fe Film Festival	Grand Prize	Catherine Eaton	Won	
2018	Galway Film Fleadh	Best International Feature Film	Catherine Eaton	Nominated	
2020	Humanitas Prize	SAMHSA Voice Award	Catherine Eaton & Bryan Delaney	Nominated	
