= My Sweet Lord (disambiguation) =

"My Sweet Lord" is a song by George Harrison.

My Sweet Lord may also refer to:

- "My Sweet Lord", a short story by Victor Milán in the Wild Cards anthology Marked Cards
- My Sweet Lord, statue by Cosimo Cavallaro
