= Danny Burstein =

American actor (born 1964)

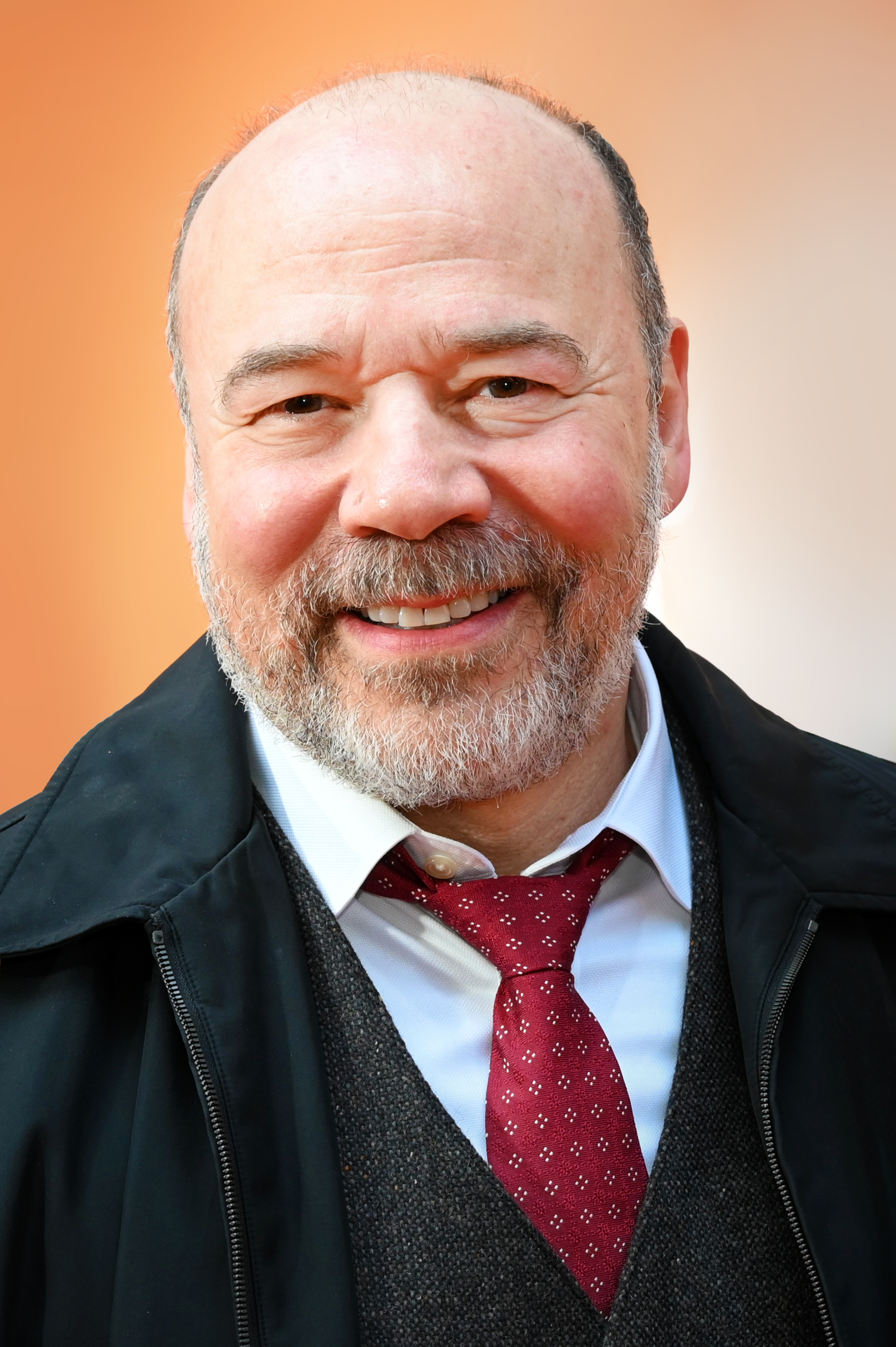
- Burstein in 2026
- Born: June 16, 1964 (age 62); Mt. Kisco, New York, U.S.
- Education: City University of New York, Queens (BA); University of California, San Diego (MFA)
- Occupations: Actor, singer
- Years active: 1986–present
- Spouses: Laura Debra Toma (m. 1987; div. 1998) Rebecca Luker (m. 2000; died 2020)
- Children: 2

Danny Burstein (born June 16, 1964) is an American actor and singer. Known for his work on Broadway stage, he has received numerous accolades including a Tony Award, a Drama League Award, and three Drama Desk Awards, in addition to nominations for four Grammy Awards.

A nine-time Tony Award nominee, Burstein won the 2020 Tony Award for Best Featured Actor in a Musical for his performance as Harold Zidler in Moulin Rouge! on Broadway. His other Tony-nominated roles were in The Drowsy Chaperone (2006), South Pacific (2008), Follies (2011), Golden Boy (2013), Cabaret (2014), Fiddler on the Roof (2015), Gypsy (2024), and Marjorie Prime (2025). Other notable Broadway credits include The Seagull (1992), Saint Joan (1993), Women on the Verge of a Nervous Breakdown (2010), and Pictures from Home (2023). He currently holds the record for the most Tony Award nominations by a male performer (9).

Burstein's television work includes a feature-length episode of the BBC sitcom Absolutely Fabulous (2002) and a Staten Island father in the first season of Louie (2010). He appeared as different characters in six episodes of the original run of the NBC drama series Law & Order (1995–2010), and also recurred as Lolly Steinman on the HBO series Boardwalk Empire (2010–2011) and as D.A. Lewis Cormier on the CBS series Evil (2019–2024). His film appearances include Transamerica (2005), Deception (2008), The Family Fang (2015), and Indignation (2016).

== Early life and education ==
Burstein was born in Mt. Kisco, New York, and was raised in New York City. Danny's parents separated when he was two months old. He was raised by his mother, Virginia (Vega), a painter, and his stepfather, Harvey Burstein, a professor of Greek philosophy. His mother, who is from Costa Rica, is Catholic and of Spanish descent, and his stepfather is Jewish. He was not raised in any particular faith and celebrated both Jewish and Christian holidays.

Burstein attended the High School of the Performing Arts. While in high school, he performed in community theatre and summer stock in New Hampshire for which he was paid $200 for the entire season. He graduated from Queens College in New York City, during which time he obtained his first professional acting job in the chorus of The Music Man at The Muny in St. Louis. He received an MFA from the graduate acting program at the University of California, San Diego in 1990. During his time in drama school at UCSD, he appeared in Macbeth at La Jolla Playhouse.

== Career ==
Burstein's early appearances on Broadway included A Little Hotel on the Side (1992), Yakov in The Seagull (1992–93), in Saint Joan and Three Men on a Horse (both in 1993), Paul in Company (1995), 1st Officer William Murdoch in Titanic (1997–99), and A Class Act (2001) at Manhattan Theatre Club. Other New York theatre performances in his early career included I Love You, You're Perfect, Now Change (1996 and 2002) at the Westside Theatre, Ru/Floor Monitor/Pianist in Merrily We Roll Along (1994) at the York Theatre at St. Peter's Church, All in the Timing (1994) at the John Houseman Theatre, Daniel in Alan Menken and David Spencer's Weird Romance (1992) at the WPA, Solomon in The Rothschilds (1990) and Hello Muddah, Hello Fadduh (1992), both at Circle in the Square, and The United Way at Ensemble Studio Theater.

Burstein appeared in the world premieres of A. R. Gurney's Mrs. Farnsworth (2004), opposite Sigourney Weaver and John Lithgow, at The Flea Theater and Psych (2001) at Playwrights Horizons. He has appeared in the Encores! (New York City Center) staged concert productions of Du Barry Was a Lady (1996), as Romeo Skragg in Li'l Abner (1998), as Tailor-Merchant in The Boys from Syracuse (1997), and as Mister Mister in The Cradle Will Rock (2013). He has appeared in four concerts at Carnegie Hall including the Ira Gershwin centennial, as Steward in Sail Away (1999), and in Candide (2018).

Burstein's early film roles included Duane Incarnate (2004), Transamerica (2005), and Deception (2008). He also appeared in several Law & Order series and the BBC's Absolutely Fabulous (2002). Burstein has lent his voice to a number of video games, including Grand Theft Auto: San Andreas, Manhunt 2, Grand Theft Auto IV, and Neverwinter Nights 2.

Burstein appeared on Broadway as Aldolpho in The Drowsy Chaperone (2006–07) and Luther Billis in South Pacific (2008–10), receiving Tony Award nominations for both. He also appeared as Taxi Driver in Women on the Verge of a Nervous Breakdown (2010–11). He was cast in HBO's Boardwalk Empire after director Martin Scorsese saw him in South Pacific, and after auditioning for three different characters, he landed the part of Lolly Steinman.

He played the role of Buddy Plummer in the Kennedy Center production of Follies, which ran from May 7, 2011, through June 19, 2011, at the Eisenhower Theater, co-starring with Bernadette Peters, Ron Raines, and Jan Maxwell. He reprised that role in the Broadway engagement of Follies at the Marquis Theatre from August 7, 2011 (in previews) through January 22, 2012, and continued with the production in its engagement at the Ahmanson Theatre in Los Angeles, California from May 3, 2012, through June 9, 2012. He won the Drama Desk Award and Outer Critics Circle Award for Outstanding Actor in a Musical and was nominated for the Tony Award for Best Actor in a Musical.

Burstein received Tony Award nominations for playing Tokio in Golden Boy (2012–2013) and Herr Schultz in the 2014 revival of Cabaret (2014–15), and also appeared on Broadway as Max in the Sharr White play The Snow Geese (2013). Burstein can be heard on the cast recordings of many musicals. Among his many recordings is the musical Sweet Little Devil in which he introduced three George Gershwin and Buddy DeSylva songs. The score originally went unrecorded in 1924 and was finally recorded by PS Classics, with Burstein playing the role of Sam in 2012. He made his Metropolitan Opera debut as Frosch in Die Fledermaus (2013–14 season). Burstein appeared in Talley's Folly (2013) opposite Sarah Paulson at The Roundabout Theater Company for which he was nominated for a Lucille Lortel Award and a Drama League Award.

Burstein serves on the Artists Committee of the Kennedy Center Honors and has been a guest lecturer teaching at many universities such as Yale, NYU, Juilliard, UCSD and Queens College.

Burstein played the role of Tevye in the 2015 Broadway revival of Fiddler on the Roof, at the Broadway Theatre, directed by Bartlett Sher. The revival began in previews on November 20, 2015, and officially opened on December 20, 2015, and closed on December 31, 2016. He received his sixth Tony Award nomination for his performance. He appeared in Rajiv Joseph's Describe the Night (2017) at the Atlantic Theater Company. In the summer of 2017, he played the role of Nick Bottom in the New York Public Theater's Shakespeare in the Park production of A Midsummer Night's Dream.

In the 2010s, Burstein appeared in films such Nor'easter (2013), Trust, Greed, Bullets and Bourbon (2013), American Milkshake (2013), Autumn Whispers (2013), Affluenza (2014), Blackhat (2015), directed by Michael Mann, The Family Fang (2015), opposite Nicole Kidman and directed by Jason Bateman, Construction (2015), Indignation (2016), written and directed by James Schamus, and The Sounding (2017), written and directed by Catherine Eaton. His television credits included guest starring on Tales of the City (2019), Fosse/Verdon (2019), The Blacklist (2019), Madam Secretary (2018), NCIS: New Orleans (2018), Instinct (2018), Elementary (2017), The Good Wife (2015), and the FX series Louie (2010).

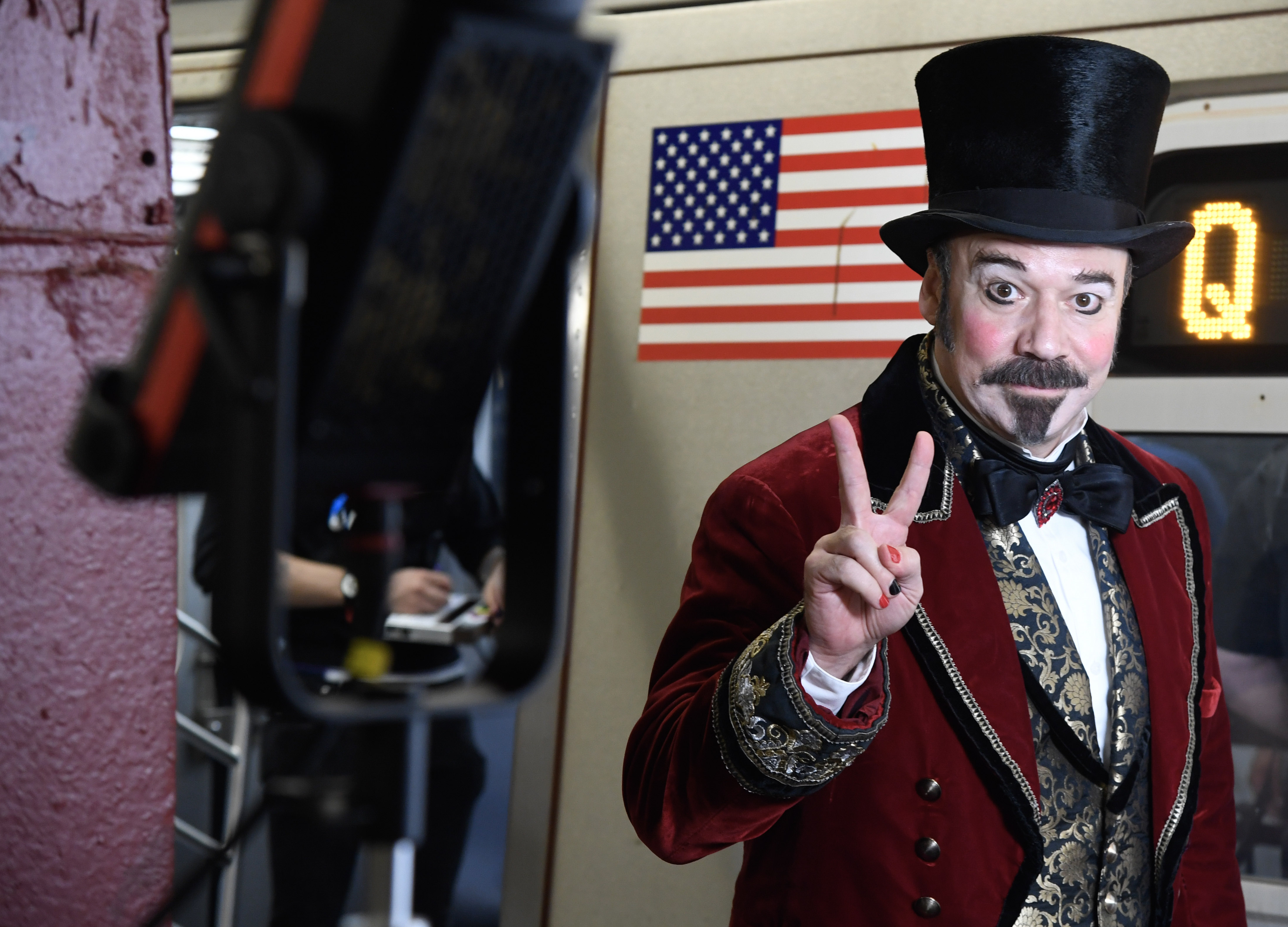
Burstein in costume as Harold Zidler, 2021

He appeared as Alfred P. Doolittle in the Broadway revival of My Fair Lady at Lincoln Center Theater starting January 8, 2019. He also originated the on-stage role of Harold Zidler in Moulin Rouge! at the Emerson Colonial Theatre in Boston from July 10, 2018, to August 19, 2018. He reprised the role on Broadway in 2019. In 2021, Burstein received the Tony Award for Best Featured Actor in a Musical for Moulin Rouge!

In 2021 he was nominated for an Audie Award for his narration of Stephen King's If It Bleeds. In recent years Burstein has had recurring roles on The Good Fight, Dr. Death, Evil as D.A. Lewis Cormier, and guest starred on the animated series Central Park as Dick Flake.

Burstein returned to the Broadway stage in the 2023 Sharr White memory play Pictures from Home alongside Nathan Lane and Zoë Wanamaker. The play is adapted from photographer Larry Sultan's photo memoir of the same name.

Burstein received Tony Award nominations for playing Herbie in Gypsy (2024–2025) and Jon in Marjorie Prime (2025).

== Personal life ==
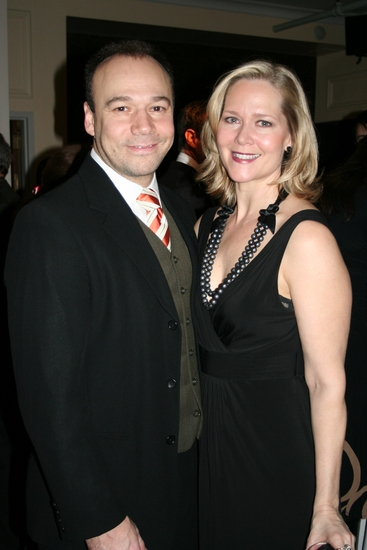
Burstein with wife Rebecca Luker, 2008

Burstein was married to actress Rebecca Luker from June 2000 until her death on December 23, 2020. He has two sons, Alexander and Zachary, from a previous marriage, and lives in Morningside Heights, Manhattan.

In March 2020, following the shutdown of all Broadway theatrical productions including Moulin Rouge!, in which he was starring, Burstein, along with several other cast members, contracted COVID-19. He was subsequently hospitalized at St. Luke's in the Morningside Heights section of Manhattan and recovered. Burstein discussed his experience with the disease in a column published in The Hollywood Reporter. He wrote in August 2020 of continued challenges with his post-COVID recovery while caring for his wife, who had ALS.

== Acting credits ==
=== Film ===
Year	Title	Role	Notes
1992	Giant Robo: The Animation	Professor Franken Von Vogler	Voice; English version Direct-to-video
1997	Jungle Emperor Leo	Minus	Voice; English version
2003	SW 2.5 (The Pitch Wars)	George Lucas / Rob Reiner / Kevin Smith / Mike W. / Pixar Director	Short film
2004	Duane Incarnate	George	
2005	Transamerica	Dr. Spikowsky	
2006	Spectropia	Ball Guest	
2008	Deception	Clute Controller	
2012	Nor'easter	Paul Moore	
2013	American Milkshake	Coach	
2013	Autumn Whispers	Gordon Murkle	Short film
2013	Trust, Greed, Bullets & Bourbon	Hector	
2014	Russian Broadway Shut Down	Luther Billis	Short film
2014	Affluenza	Ira Miller	
2015	Blackhat	Associate Warden Jeffries	
2015	The Family Fang	Eric Wilcox	
2015	Construction	Jay	
2015	Bad Dads	Unknown role	Short film
2016	Indignation	Max Messner	
2017	The Sounding	Anderson	
2018	Lucy in the Sky	Dan	Short film
2021	The Same Storm	Dr. Daniel Berg	
2021	Tick, Tick... Boom!	Al	
2022	Forty Winks	Mr. Monroe	
2023	Molli and Max in the Future	Max's dad	
2023	Dora and the Fantastical Creatures	Sol	Voice; Short film
2026	The Debut		

=== Television ===
Year	Title	Role	Notes
1995	Law & Order	Joe Garvey	Episode: "Cruel and Unusual"
1998	Law & Order	Howe	Episode: "Burden"
1999	Third Watch	Medic #2	Episode: "Welcome to Camelot"
2000	Law & Order: Special Victims Unit	Mr. Brookfield	Episode: "Honor"
2001	Santa, Baby!	Unknown role (voice)	Television movie
2001	Law & Order	Asst. DA Lester Rosenfeld	Episode: "Teenage Wasteland"
2002	Ed	Johnny Luggozzo	Episode: "Human Nature"
2002	Absolutely Fabulous	Martin	Episode: "Gay"
2002	Law & Order	Peter	Episode: "Oxymoron"
2004	Shura no Toki: Age of Chaos	Takuan Osho	Episode: "A Fighter Without Peer"; Voice; English version
2004	Phoenix	Sarutahiko / Dr. Saruta / Azaumi-no-muraji Saruta	Series regular (13 episodes); Voice; English version
2004	Hope & Faith	Moderator	Episode: "Just-In Time"
2004	Law & Order: Criminal Intent	Luke Vinton	Episode: "Shrink-Wrapped"
2006	Conviction	Unknown role	Episode: "Savasana"
2007	Law & Order: Criminal Intent	Leo Bernardi	Episode: "Seeds"
2009	Law & Order	Surrogate Murray	Episode: "Lucky Stiff"
2010	Law & Order	Judge Sam Murray	Episode: "Blackmail"
2010	Louie	Mike	Episode: "Bully"
2010	Live from Lincoln Center	Luther Billis	Episode: "South Pacific"
2010–2011	Boardwalk Empire	Lolly Steinman	Recurring role (5 episodes)
2011	Submissions Only	Jerry Labove	Episode: "Mean Like Me"
2015	Law & Order: Special Victims Unit	Eric Parker	Episode: "Transgender Bridge"
2015	The Good Wife	Dr. Ian Caine	Episode: "Bond"
2017	Elementary	Ted Winthrop	Episode: "Fly Into a Rage, Make a Bad Landing"
2018	Deception	Indar Danek	Episode: "Transposition"
2018	NCIS: New Orleans	Doctor Vincent Welles	Episode: "Pound of Flesh"
2018	The Marvelous Mrs. Maisel	Sewell	Episode: "Midnight at the Concord"
2019	Madam Secretary	Natan Dworsky	Episode: "Proxy War"
2019	The Blacklist	Mossad DC Station Chief	Episode: "The Osterman Umbrella Company (No. 6)"
2019	Fosse/Verdon	OB / GYN	Episode: "Nowadays"
2019	Tales of the City	Bradshaw	Episode: "Next Level Sh*t"
2019	Instinct	Brent	Episode: "Go Figure"
2019–2024	Evil	D. A. Lewis Cormier	6 episodes
2020	Central Park	Dick Flake	Voice; Episode: "A Fish Called Snakehead"
2021	Tell Me Your Secrets	Unknown role	Episode: "Once I Had a Love"
2021	Law & Order: Organized Crime	Vincent Weiss	Episode: "The Stuff That Dreams Are Made Of"
2021	Dr. Death	Ed Yarborough	2 episodes
2021–2022	The Good Fight	William Schultz	3 episodes
2021	F Is for Family	Officer Glanney	Voice; 4 episodes
2022	Winning Time: The Rise of the Lakers Dynasty	Vic Weiss	Episode: "The Best Is Yet to Come"
2022–2024	Tokyo Vice	Eddie Adelstein	3 episodes
2023	Will Trent	Faith's APD Partner	Episode: "Pilot"
2023	Grease: Rise of the Pink Ladies	Johnny Vavoom	4 episodes
2023	Julia	Stanley Lipschitz	6 episodes
2024–present	Dora	Grumpy Old Troll, Frog, Marmoset (voices)	78 episodes
2025	Long Story Short	Uncle Barry (voice)	3 episodes

=== Theatre ===
Year	Title	Role	Notes
1986	Joseph and the Amazing Technicolor Dreamcoat	The Muny	
1987	Fiddler on the Roof	Mendel	
1988	Grease	Sonny	
1992	Weird Romance	3rd Fan/Paramedic/Technician/Reporter/Film Director/Daniel	Off-Broadway
1992	A Little Hotel on the Side	Porter, Constable	Broadway
1992–1993	The Seagull	Yakov	Broadway
1993	Saint Joan	Page to Dunois	Broadway
1993	Three Men on a Horse	Delivery Boy	Broadway
1994	The Flowering Peach	Japheth (standby)	Broadway
1994	Merrily We Roll Along	Ru/Floor Monitor/Pianist	Off-Broadway
1995	Company	Paul	Broadway
1996	I Love You, You're Perfect, Now Change	Man #2	Off-Broadway
1996	Du Barry Was a Lady	Ensemble	Encores!/Off-Broadway
1997	The Boys from Syracuse	Tailor-Merchant	Encores!/Off-Broadway
1997	Harmony	"Rabbi" Josef Roman Cycowski	Regional
1997–1999	Titanic	William Murdoch/Passenger u/s Harold Bride	Broadway
1998	Li'l Abner	Romeo Skragg	Encores!/Off-Broadway
2001	A Class Act	Ed, Lehman (standby)	Broadway
2001	Psych	Bill/Michael/Gar/Advocate	Off-Broadway
2004	Mrs. Farnsworth	Gordon Bell	Off-Broadway
2005	The Sound of Music	Max Detweiler	The Muny
2006–2007	The Drowsy Chaperone	Aldolpho	Broadway
2008–2010	South Pacific	Luther Billis	Broadway
2010–2011	Women on the Verge of a Nervous Breakdown	Taxi Driver	Broadway
2011	Follies	Buddy Plummer	Pre-Broadway
2011–2012	Follies	Buddy Plummer	Broadway
2012	Follies	Buddy Plummer	Regional
2012–2013	Golden Boy	Tokio	Broadway
2013	Talley's Folly	Matt Friedman	Off-Broadway
2013	The Cradle Will Rock	Mister Mister	Encores!/Off-Broadway
2013	The Snow Geese	Max Hohmann	Broadway
2014–2015	Cabaret	Herr Schultz	Broadway
2015–2016	Fiddler on the Roof	Tevye	Broadway
2017	A Midsummer Night's Dream	Nick Bottom	Shakespeare in the Park
2017	Damn Yankees	Van Buren	Broadway Concert
2017	Describe the Night	Isaac	Off-Broadway
2018	Moulin Rouge!	Harold Zidler	Pre-Broadway
2019	My Fair Lady	Alfred P. Doolittle	Broadway
2019	Camelot	Pellinore	Broadway Concert
2019–2022	Moulin Rouge!	Harold Zidler	Broadway
2023	Pictures from Home	Larry Sultan	Broadway
2024	South Pacific	Luther Billis	Broadway Concert
2024–2025	Gypsy	Herbie	Broadway
2025	Marjorie Prime	Jon	Broadway
2026–2027	Awake and Sing!	Uncle Morty	Broadway

=== Video games ===
Year	Title	Role	Notes
2004	Grand Theft Auto: San Andreas	Darius Fontaine – Talk Radio / Radio Commercial	
2006	Neverwinter Nights 2	Khulmar Ironfist, Sir Grayson, Donler, Haeromos	
2007	Manhunt 2	The Legion	
2008	Grand Theft Auto IV	Middle Aged Gay Man	Credited under "The Crowd of Liberty City"

== Awards and nominations ==
Year	Award	Category	Work	Result	Ref.
2006	Tony Award	Best Featured Actor in a Musical	The Drowsy Chaperone	Nominated	
2008	Tony Award	Best Featured Actor in a Musical	South Pacific	Nominated	
2008	Drama Desk Award	Outstanding Featured Actor in a Musical	South Pacific	Nominated	
2008	Outer Critics Circle Award	Outstanding Featured Actor in a Musical	South Pacific	Won	
2012	Tony Award	Best Actor in a Musical	Follies	Nominated	
2012	Drama Desk Award	Outstanding Actor in a Musical	Follies	Won	
2012	Outer Critics Circle Award	Outstanding Actor in a Musical	Follies	Won	
2012	Astaire Award	Outstanding Male Dancer in a Broadway Show	Follies	Nominated	
2013	Tony Award	Best Featured Actor in a Play	Golden Boy	Nominated	
2013	Outer Critics Circle Award	Outstanding Featured Actor in a Play	Golden Boy	Nominated	
2013	Drama League Award	Distinguished Performance	Talley's Folly	Nominated	
2013	Lucille Lortel Award	Outstanding Lead Actor	Talley's Folly	Nominated	
2013	Grammy Award	Best Musical Theater Album	Follies	Nominated	
2014	Tony Award	Best Featured Actor in a Musical	Cabaret	Nominated	
2014	Drama Desk Award	Outstanding Featured Actor in a Musical	Cabaret	Nominated	
2014	Outer Critics Circle Award	Outstanding Featured Actor in a Musical	Cabaret	Nominated	
2016	Tony Award	Best Actor in a Musical	Fiddler on the Roof	Nominated	
2016	Drama Desk Award	Outstanding Actor in a Musical	Fiddler on the Roof	Won	
2016	Drama League Award	Distinguished Performance	Fiddler on the Roof	Nominated	
2016	Outer Critics Circle Award	Outstanding Actor in a Musical	Fiddler on the Roof	Won	
2017	Grammy Award	Best Musical Theater Album	Fiddler on the Roof	Nominated	
2019	IRNE Award	Best Supporting Actor in a Musical	Moulin Rouge!	Won	
2020	Tony Award	Best Featured Actor in a Musical	Moulin Rouge!	Won	
2020	Drama League Award	Distinguished Performance	Moulin Rouge!	Won	
2020	Outer Critics Circle Award	Outstanding Featured Actor in a Musical	Moulin Rouge!	Honored	
2020	Grammy Award	Best Musical Theater Album	Moulin Rouge!	Nominated	
2025	Tony Award	Best Featured Actor in a Musical	Gypsy	Nominated	
2025	Outer Critics Circle Award	Outstanding Featured Performer in a Broadway Musical	Gypsy	Nominated	
2026	Grammy Award	Best Musical Theater Album	Gypsy	Nominated	
2026	Tony Award	Best Featured Actor in a Play	Marjorie Prime	Nominated	
2026	Dorian Award	Outstanding Featured Performance in a Broadway Play	Marjorie Prime	Nominated	
2026	Outer Critics Circle Award	Outstanding Featured Performer in a Broadway Play	Marjorie Prime	Nominated	

== See also ==
- List of Tony Award records
