= Catherine Eaton =

Native-American actress and filmmaker

- Born: Essex Junction, Vermont
- Education: Cornell University (BA); University of Minnesota (MFA)
- Occupations: Filmmaker; actress
- Years active: 1998–present
- Awards: Emmy Award (2008)

Catherine Eaton is an American actress and filmmaker. She appeared in the original Broadway company of Sharr White’s The Snow Geese at Manhattan Theater Club. In 2019 she appeared in Ella Hickson’s play Oil at the Olney Theatre Center, for which she was nominated for the Helen Hayes Award for Outstanding Lead Performance in a Play.

In 2008 she won a Primetime Emmy Award for Outstanding Documentary for Deadly Brew: The Human Toll for Ethanol, which aired on Bloomberg Television. In 2017 she wrote, directed, and starred in her first narrative feature, The Sounding, which received over two dozen awards and nominations on the festival circuit. Eaton regularly teaches directing and screenwriting at Harvard Summer School.

== Early life and education ==
Catherine Eaton was born and raised in Essex Junction, Vermont. She earned a BA in International Law from Cornell University, and an MFA in Acting from the University of Minnesota. She is a graduate of Mountview Academy of Theatre Arts in London, England.

== Career ==
Eaton made her professional stage debut in 1998 as Titania in A Midsummer Night's Dream at the Guthrie Theater, directed by Joe Dowling. She would go on to spend three seasons as a resident company member, appearing in Oscar Wilde's The Importance of Being Earnest, Carlo Goldoni's The Venetian Twins, Charles Dickens' A Christmas Carol, and William Shakespeare's Julius Caesar. In 2000 Eaton reprised her role in A Midsummer Night's Dream for a Guthrie Theater National Tour.

In 2004 Eaton made her Off-Broadway debut as Anna/Sister Margaret in Thomas Gibbon's Bee-Luther-Hatchee at Blue Heron Theatre. That same year she appeared as Adriana in William Shakespeare's The Comedy of Errors at the Hamptons Shakespeare Festival. The following year she appeared as Frances in Vincent Sessa's A Child's Guide to Innocence at New Jersey Repertory Theater, and Lily in Brian Delaney's The Cobbler at the Irish Classical Theatre in Buffalo, NY. The latter performance earned her a Katharine Cornell Award for Outstanding Contribution by a Visiting Artist at the 2005 Artie Awards, presented by Buffalo Toronto Public Media. In 2006 Eaton appeared as Caroline in the American premiere of Samuel Adamson's Clocks and Whistles at Origin Theatre Company. The following year she returned to the Irish Classical Theatre to star as Josie in Eugene O'Neill's A Moon for the Misbegotten. She would return to the Irish Classical Theatre once more in 2009 to portray the titular role in Henrik Ibsen's Hedda Gabler. The following year she collaborated again with Irish playwright Brian Delaney, appearing in his play The Bohemians at Carnegie Hall.

In 2011 she appeared as Allie in Bob Clyman's The Exceptionals at Merrimack Repertory Theatre; as Anna in Joseph Lauinger's Michael Archangel at Fulton Theatre; and as the titular role in Sophocles' Electra at the Pittsburgh Public Theater. For her performance in the former she earned a Best Actress nomination at the 2012 IRNE Awards. The following year she portrayed Karen Weston in Tracy Letts' Pulitzer Prize winning August: Osage County at Fulton Theatre. Eaton made her Broadway debut in 2013 in Sharr White's The Snow Geese at Manhattan Theatre Club, understudying the roles of Elizabeth Gaesling and Clarissa Hohmann for Mary Louise Parker and Victoria Clark, respectively. Five years later, in 2018 she appeared May in the American premiere of Ella Hickson's Oil at the Olney Theatre Center. For her turn she earned a nomination for Outstanding Lead Performance in a Play at the 2019 Helen Hayes Awards.

In addition to her work on stage, Eaton's film credits include With or Without You (1998), The Tempest (2001), and Last Seen (2002). Her television credits include All My Children, Person of Interest, and Switch. In 2018 she appeared in a four part VR adaptation of Sigmund Freud's The Interpretation of Dreams. Part one debuted at the 2018 Tribeca Film Festival, while part four premiered at the Vancouver Film Festival. The series was subsequently distributed by Samsung.

=== Corsetless ===
In 2005 Eaton relocated to her hometown of Essex Junction, Vermont to help care for her injured mother. While at home, she got the idea for a one-woman stage play. The result wasCorsetless, which tells the story of Liv, a brilliant yet misunderstood woman struggling for her freedom within a psychiatric institution. Confined and isolated, Liv refuses to abandon her unique voice, speaking only in the words of William Shakespeare, as she fiercely defends her sanity against the doctors determined to conceal her.

The play was first presented in 2006 with a staged reading at Lincoln Center Theatre, directed by Austin Pendleton. It was subsequently produced in 2007 by the Irish Classical Theatre in Buffalo, New York, directed by Derek Campbell. Corsetless later played a sold-out Carnegie Hall in 2008, accompanied by an original score from award-winning concert pianist, Elaine Kwon. Later that year the play had a ten venue national tour throughout Ireland. Corsetless would later be adapted for screen, resulting in Eaton's 2017 feature The Sounding.

=== The Sounding ===
In 2010 Eaton was approached by John Knowles about staging Corsetless as an installation piece in the glassed-in storefront space of the Roger Smith Hotel in Midtown Manhattan. While hesitant at first, Eaton was subsequently convinced, and one year later the installation became a cult hit, routinely drawing crowds large enough to create a public safety hazard. During this run of the play, Eaton recalled

Every night this man would come in a tuxedo that I thought was a caterer because I didn’t know anyone else who would wear a tuxedo every day. He would sometimes come alone and sometimes with his family and he always had a peach colored Financial Times under his arm, so the guys in the back jokingly called him “the Financier.” They’d say, “Oh. Has the Financier come tonight?” On the last night of the play he waited for me afterwards and said, “I want to turn your play into a feature film.” He became the first investor and literally changed my life.

Corsetless was subsequently re-worked into a 2015 short film, which served as a proof of concept for the 2017 feature length film. Eaton would document this incremental process from stage to screen in a panel at the 2016 SXSW Festival entitled “Through Our Eyes: Female Filmmakers Tell All.” In 2018 the making of The Sounding would become the subject of a branded mini-doc by Stella Artois entitled “The Art of Living: Catherine Eaton,” which aired on Hulu.

The Sounding premiered in competition at the 2017 Cinequest Film Festival, and went on to receive over two dozen awards and nominations on the festival circuit. The film was subsequently distributed by Giant Pictures and HBO Europe.

=== Directing ===
After 2015, Eaton began to concentrate on writing and directing for film, television, and radio. In 2016, she was awarded a "Through Her Lens" Grant from the Tribeca Film Institute / Chanel for her pilot "On The Outs." The following year she was selected as a shadowing director for Ryan Murphy's "Half Program," working on the first season of the hit Fox series 9-1-1. In 2019 her pilot "Breaking News" - based on her personal experience working with freelance news crews in conflict zones – was selected for The Gotham Film & Media Institute's Independent Film Week Project Forum, and named a finalist for the Sundance Institute's Television Lab. In 2023 her pilot "Flawless: A Feminist Fairytale" was awarded Best TV Screenplay at the Santa Barbara International Film Festival. Additionally, Eaton is a Statera Mentee under Showrunner Kit Steinkellner, and an inaugural Avalon: Story Fellow. Since 2020 she has served as a writer and director for Next Chapter Podcasts, where she has directed seven fiction episodes and written/adapted 75+ episodes in collaboration with Marcus Gardley, Jeff Whitty, and others.

== Personal life ==
Eaton is of mixed European and Native American ancestry. In 2023 she wan named an inaugural filmmaker of reGen media, "the first and only Indigenous owned and women led" film incubator of its kind.

== Acting credits ==
=== Film ===
Year	Title	Role	Notes
1998	With or Without You	Zanne	
2001	The Tempest	Venus	
2002	Last Seen	Kelly Ann	
2017	The Sounding	Olivia	

=== Television ===
Year	Title	Role	Notes
2008	All My Children	Sherry	Recurring, Season 38
2013	Person of Interest	Jillian	Episode: "Reasonable Doubt"
2018	The Interpretation Of Dreams	Various	4 episodes
2018	Switch	Belladonna	7 episodes

=== Stage ===
Year	Title	Role	Playwright	Venue	Ref.
1998	A Midsummer Night's Dream	Titania	William Shakespeare	Guthrie Theater	
1998	The Importance of Being Earnest	Miss Prism	Oscar Wilde	Guthrie Theater	
1998	The Venetian Twins	Rosaura	Carlo Goldoni / Kevin Kling	Guthrie Theater	
1998	A Christmas Carol	Mrs. Cratchit	Charles Dickens	Guthrie Theater	
1999	Julius Caesar	Calpurnia	William Shakespeare	Guthrie Theater	
2000	A Midsummer Night's Dream	Titania	William Shakespeare	National Tour	
2004	The Comedy of Errors	Adriana	William Shakespeare	Hamptons Shakespeare Festival	
2004	Bee-Luther-Hatchee	Anna/Sister Margaret	Thomas Gibbons	Blue Heron Theatre	
2005	A Child's Guide to Innocence	Frances	Vincent Sessa	New Jersey Repertory Theater	
2005	The Cobbler	Lily	Brian Delaney	Irish Classical Theatre	
2006	Clocks and Whistles	Caroline	Samuel Adamson	Origin Theatre Company	
2007	A Moon for the Misbegotten	Josie	Eugene O'Neill	Irish Classical Theatre	
2007	Corsetless	Liv	Catherine Eaton	Irish Classical Theatre	
2008	Corsetless	Liv	Catherine Eaton	Carnegie Hall	
2009	Corsetless	Liv	Catherine Eaton	Irish National Tour	
2009	Hedda Gabler	Hedda Gabler	Henrik Ibsen / Andrew Upton	Irish Classical Theatre	
2010	The Bohemians	Woman	Brian Delaney	Carnegie Hall	
2011	The Exceptionals	Allie	Bob Clyman	Merrimack Repertory Theater	
2011	Michael Archangel	Anna	Joseph Lauinger	Fulton Theatre	
2011	Electra	Electra / Frank McGuinness	Sophocles	Pittsburgh Public Theater	
2012	August: Osage County	Karen Weston	Tracy Letts	Fulton Theatre	
2012	Corsetless	Liv	Catherine Eaton	Roger Smith Hotel	
2013	The Snow Geese	Elizabeth Gaesling / Clarissa Hohmann (u/s)	Sharr White	Manhattan Theatre Club	
2019	Oil	May	Ella Hickson	Olney Theatre Center	

== Filmmaking credits ==
Year	Title	Director	Writer	Producer	Notes
2008	Deadly Brew: The Human Toll for Ethanol	No	Yes	Yes	Bloomberg Television
2017	The Sounding	Yes	Yes	Yes	Giant Pictures / HBO Europe
2025	The Mohawk Trail †	No	Yes	No	Post-production
TBA	The Control Room †	Yes	Yes	Yes	Pre-production

Key
†	Denotes films that have not yet been released

== Awards ==
Year	Association	Category	Work	Result	Ref.
2005	Artie Awards	Katharine Cornell Award	The Cobbler	Won	
2008	Emmy Awards	Outstanding Documentary	Deadly Brew: The Human Toll for Ethanol	Won	
2009	New York Foundation for the Arts	Artist Fellowship	Corsetless	Won	
2012	IRNE Awards	Best Actress	The Exceptionals	Nominated	
2016	Tribeca Film Institute	Through Her Lens	On The Outs	Won	
2016	Tribeca Film Institute	IWC Filmmaker Award	The Sounding	Runner-up	
2017	Cinequest Film & Creativity Festival	Feature Film - Drama	The Sounding	Nominated	
2017	Palm Beach International Film Festival	Jury Prize - Best Narrative Feature Film	The Sounding	Won	
2017	Minneapolis–Saint Paul International Film Festival	Jury Prize - Best Narrative Feature Film	The Sounding	Won	
2017	Minneapolis–Saint Paul International Film Festival	New American Visions Audience Award	The Sounding	Won	
2017	Arizona International Film Festival	Grand Prize	The Sounding	Won	
2017	Brooklyn Film Festival	Audience Choice - Best Narrative Feature Film	The Sounding	Won	
2017	Brooklyn Film Festival	Best New Voice	The Sounding	Won	
2017	Maine International Film Festival	Audience Choice - Best Film	The Sounding	Won	
2017	Woods Hole Film Festival	Best Feature Drama	The Sounding	Runner-up	
2017	Stony Brook Film Festival	Jury Prize - Best Narrative Feature Film	The Sounding	Won	
2017	Hell's Half Mile Film & Music Festival	Best Feature Film	The Sounding	Nominated	
2017	Hell's Half Mile Film & Music Festival	Best Screenplay	The Sounding	Nominated	
2017	Hell's Half Mile Film & Music Festival	Best Actress	The Sounding	Nominated	
2017	Buffalo International Film Festival	Best Feature	The Sounding	Nominated	
2017	Woodstock Film Festival	Best Cinematography	The Sounding	Won	
2017	YES Film Festival	Grand Prize	The Sounding	Won	
2017	Naples International Film Festival	Audience Choice - Best Film	The Sounding	Won	
2017	Denver Film Festival	Women+Film, Best Feature Film	The Sounding	Nominated	
2017	Napa Valley Film Festival	Best Actress	The Sounding	Nominated	
2018	Oxford International Film Festival	Best Narrative Feature	The Sounding	Won	
2018	Oxford International Film Festival	Lisa Blount Memorial Acting Award	The Sounding	Won	
2018	Manchester Film Festival	Best Actress	The Sounding	Won	
2018	Santa Fe Film Festival	Grand Prize	The Sounding	Won	
2018	Galway Film Fleadh	Best International Feature Film	The Sounding	Nominated	
2019	Helen Hayes Awards	Outstanding Lead Performance	Oil	Nominated	
2020	Humanitas Prize	SAMHSA Voice Award	The Sounding	Nominated	
2023	Santa Barbara International Film Festival	Best TV Screenplay	Flawless: A Feminist Fairytale	Won	
