= Chris Savido =

American painter

Chris Savido is an American artist whose acrylic portrait of George W. Bush composed of monkeys created controversy when the managers of Chelsea Market closed down the "ANIMAL'S PARADISE" art exhibition there because of it. It was later auctioned on eBay.

There was debate over whether the closing of the show constituted censorship. Supporters of the managers claimed that Chelsea Market was private, and thus management had a right to exclude the painting, while supporters of Savido "[looked] into the degree to which the Chelsea Market walkways are legally definable as 'public space,' and, as such, fully protected by the First Amendment."

Anonymous donors later paid for a digital billboard over the Holland Tunnel to show a detail of the painting.

== See also ==
- David Černý
- Angela Singer
- Cosimo Cavallaro
