= Virgil Blum =

American Jesuit

The Reverend Father Virgil Blum SJ
- Born: Virgil Clarence Blum; March 27, 1913; Defiance, Iowa, US
- Died: April 5, 1990 (aged 77); Milwaukee, Wisconsin, US
- Known for: Founding the Catholic League

Ecclesiastical career
- Religion: Christianity (Roman Catholic)
- Church: Latin Church
- Ordained: 1947 (priest)

Academic background
- Education: St. Stanislaus Seminary; Saint Louis University
- Thesis: Legal Aspects of Equality and Religious Liberty (1953)

Academic work
- Discipline: Political science
- Institutions: Marquette University
- Main interests: American constitutional law; interest-group politics

Virgil Clarence Blum SJ (1913–1990) was an American Jesuit and professor of political science at Marquette University.

== Early life and education ==
Virgil Clarence Blum was born on March 27, 1913, in Defiance, Iowa, one of twelve children of John and Elizabeth Blum. He entered the Society of Jesus in 1934 and was ordained to the priesthood in 1947. In 1938 Blum received a bachelor's degree in Latin and English from St. Stanislaus Seminary at Florissant, Missouri. In 1945 he earned a master's degree in history and political science from Saint Louis University. Blum returned to Saint Louis University in 1950 for doctoral studies, earning a Doctor of Philosophy degree in political science and US history in 1954. His area of expertise was American constitutional law and interest-group politics.

== Teaching career ==
From 1953 to 1956 Blum taught at Creighton University. In 1956 he joined the political science faculty at Marquette University, receiving promotion to associate professor in 1958 and full professor in 1961. Blum served as chairman of the political science department from 1962 to 1974. In 1978 he was named professor emeritus. During his years at Marquette, Blum served on many university committees, and he received the institution's Teaching Excellence Award in 1966. Blum published twelve books and nearly 400 articles.

== Civil rights activism ==
Embodying the Jesuit ideal of the "contemplative in action", Blum pursued public advocacy on behalf of educational reform and religious and civil rights. He advocated for parental choice in education through school vouchers for students in private schools. In 1961 Blum helped to found the Wisconsin chapter of Citizens for Educational Freedom (CEF), and he was also active in the national organization, serving on its board of directors and executive committee and, for a time, as its national executive director. Blum traveled the United States giving talks to civil and religious groups, and he often contributed editorials to newspapers throughout the country.

In 1973 Blum founded the Catholic League for Religious and Civil Rights and served as its president until 1989. Modeled on the American Civil Liberties Union and Anti-Defamation League, the Catholic League sought to safeguard the religious freedom and free speech of Catholics. In 1983 Pope John Paul II recognized Blum's service by naming him a Knight of the Equestrian Order of the Holy Sepulchre of Jerusalem.

== Later life ==
In 1989 Blum was diagnosed with cancer, and he died on April 5, 1990, in his room at Marquette University's Jesuit Residence.

== Archival collections ==
Rev. Virgil C. Blum, S.J., Papers, 1947-1990

The collection documents Blum's service activities both within and outside Marquette University. It contains no materials from his life prior to ordination in the Society of Jesus. The university-related papers make up only a fraction of the whole: a majority of the collection pertains to Blum's involvement in Citizens for Educational Freedom (CEF) and The Catholic League for Religious and Civil Rights. The collection also contains manuscripts of Blum's articles and presentations as well as copies of his published articles, mostly from popular journals and newspapers. Many of the manuscripts are undated. The collection also contains a variety of audiovisual materials, including some sound recordings of Blum's speaking engagements and video recordings of his television appearances.

Blum was a voluminous correspondent, and letters are the most abundant type of document in the collection. He mixed his incoming and outgoing correspondence, and he appears to have maintained several different filing schemes for his letters. Correspondence is scattered throughout the collection. Because Blum's personal and professional lives were so closely intertwined, researchers will find correspondence related to his public advocacy efforts among files labeled as personal correspondence.
