= Catholic League (U.S.) =

Roman Catholic advocacy organization in the United States

- Catholic League for Religious and Civil Rights
- Logo of the Catholic League
- Formation: 1973; 53 years ago
- Founder: Virgil Blum
- Founded at: Milwaukee, Wisconsin, US
- Legal status: 501(c)(3) organization
- Headquarters: New York City, New York, US
- Region served: United States
- President: Bill Donohue
- Chairman: Walter Knysz Jr.
- Revenue: US$3.5 million (2019)
- Expenses: US$3.3 million (2019)
- Endowment: US$30.8 million (2019)
- Staff: 10
- Website: https://www.catholicleague.org/

The Catholic League for Religious and Civil Rights, often shortened to the Catholic League, is an American Catholic organization whose stated purpose is to "defend the right of Catholics – lay and clergy alike – to participate in American public life without defamation or discrimination." The Catholic League states that it is "motivated by the letter and the spirit of the First Amendment ... to safeguard both the religious freedom rights and the free speech rights of Catholics whenever and wherever they are threatened." According to the Encyclopedia of American Religion and Politics, the league "is regarded by many as the preeminent organization representing the views of American lay Catholics."

Founded in 1973 by the Jesuit priest Virgil Blum, the Catholic League was formed to counter discrimination against Catholics in American government and popular culture. The low-profile group initiated public education campaigns and some lawsuits. In 1993 the group became much more aggressive with a new president, the former sociology professor Bill Donohue, who also increased its size to become the largest Catholic advocacy organization in the US. The Catholic League is known for press releases about what it views as anti-Catholic and anti-Christian themes in mass media.

The Catholic League has taken a stand against anything they perceive as anti-Catholic, including the entertainment industry, certain art exhibits, school programs for sex education, government-funded contraception and abortion, media bias, restrictions against anti-abortion activism, and restrictions on religious schools. It publishes a journal, Catalyst, and operates a website.

The league under Donohue's leadership is criticized for its conservatism and for its combative responses to high-profile media stories. Besides education campaigns, the group issues condemnations, initiates boycotts and protests, defends priests against accusations of child sexual abuse, fights proposed legislation and threatens legal action against what it sees as bigotry against Catholics, irreverence against religious figures, and attacks on Catholic dogma. However, the Catholic League stresses that "it does not speak authoritatively for the Church as a whole."

== Organizational overview ==
=== Foundation and early years ===
The league was founded in Milwaukee on May 12, 1973, by Virgil Blum. Blum served as president of the Catholic League until 1988. John Tierney served as president from 1990 to 1993.

=== Bill Donohue ===
Since 1993, the league has been led by its board of directors president, Bill Donohue, who works with a small number of organizational staffers. In a 1999 New York Times article, a reporter said Donohue is pragmatic in regards to religion, "media savvy" and "steers clear of divisive debates on theological doctrines and secular politics". The article said Donohue "fans simmering anger with inflammatory news releases, a Web site and newsletter" with "scathing attacks on the blasphemous and the irreverent". In a 2007 interview, Salon Life staff writer Rebecca Traister discussed Donohue with Frances Kissling, former head of the organization Catholics for Choice, which opposes Catholic teaching on abortion, who characterized Donohue as "abusive", and stated she avoided doing media interviews with him for this reason.

=== Operations and organization ===
The league is organized under a board of directors chaired by Walter Knysz. The league also has board of advisors, consisting of prominent lay Catholics like Brent Bozell, Linda Chavez, Mary Ann Glendon, Alan Keyes, Tom Monaghan, and George Weigel. The league issues a journal, Catalyst, as well as reports, such as Pope Pius XII and the Holocaust, books, brochures and an annual Report on Anti-Catholicism.

=== Association with the Catholic Church ===
The Catholic League is a lay Catholic organization that is independent of the Catholic Church. However, it is listed in The Official Catholic Directory (see the Miscellaneous section under the Archdiocese of New York). According to a New York Times interviewer, the organization "maintains close ties to the New York Archdiocese leadership. Several bishops make personal donations. John Cardinal O'Connor spoke at the group's 25th anniversary reception in 1998 and vacated part of his suite for its expanding operations, said Joseph Zwilling, a spokesman for the Archdiocese of New York." Timothy Cardinal Dolan spoke at the Catholic League's 50th anniversary celebration on April 27, 2023. The league includes on its website endorsements from many prominent clerics.

=== Membership ===
The New York Times reported that the Catholic League had 11,000 members when Donohue took over the group in 1993. By 1999, membership had grown to 350,000, two-thirds of whom were paying members. This is the last estimate of overall membership that the league made. The league's 2003 statement showed 15,000 members in Nassau and Suffolk counties of New York alone. Annual donations entitle members to home delivery of the print version of Catalyst, the group's monthly journal, which is also available for free on the Catholic League's website.

=== Political alignment ===
The Catholic League says it is politically neutral, which is mostly required of non-profits. The website states, "The League wishes to be neither left nor right, liberal or conservative, revolutionary or reactionary." Although often characterized as conservative the league has at times been at odds with conservative figures and organizations. For example, they criticized the anti-illegal immigration group, the Minutemen, for opposing a San Diego priest's facilitation of employment for Latino immigrants and for condemning the church as a whole in public statements about the matter. The Catholic League also condemned pastor and televangelist John Hagee for what they called "anti-Catholic hate speech" and called upon John McCain's 2008 presidential campaign to renounce this alleged bigotry.

Christian Leftist John Swomley criticized the Catholic League as the "most dangerous of the far-right organizations." Donohue has been called "right-wing" and "a conservative reactionary who wants to undo the work of Vatican II and suppress varying opinions within the Church."

== Activities ==
=== Joan Osborne ===
In 1996, Donohue took issue with Joan Osborne over her song "One of Us", which explores the question of what it would be like if God were a human being. Donohue questioned the point of the song and brought up her activism calling for support of Rock for Choice and other pro-choice groups stating, "It is no wonder that Joan Osborne instructs her fans to donate their time and money to Planned Parenthood. It is of a piece with her politics and her prejudices. Her songs and videos offer a curious mix of both, the effect of which is to dance awfully close to the line of Catholic baiting." Religious educator Paul Moses stated that Donohue's was a "tortured reading" and he saw Osborne as having "the Catholic imagination" with the song "awakening ... spiritual hunger". Osborne said, in a letter to fans, that "the church's attitudes toward women and gays make the pope look far more ridiculous than any pop song could" and that she did not write the song, which "speaks of the pope only with respect." Donohue also admitted that he was treating the issue in a "kind of a prophylactic approach" because "cultures are changed as a result of patterns."

=== Nothing Sacred ===
In 1997, Donohue declared the ABC show Nothing Sacred as deeply offensive to Catholicism, although not anti-Catholic in the traditional sense. Calling for a boycott, he stated that the show portrayed Catholics with a traditional view as cold or cruel while glorifying more the maverick, irreverent voices in the community. However, the show was defended by some Catholics and had been written with the consultation of Jesuits, from which it later won the Humanitas Prize. Many Catholics agreed with him that the show was hostile to the beliefs and values of the Catholic Church, and ABC canceled Nothing Sacred after less than a season, reportedly for poor ratings. Observers think Donohue may have played a significant role in the show's rapid demise as advertisers often become leery of shows deemed "controversial". With regard to the controversy, Henry Herx, director of the United States Conference of Catholic Bishops' Office of Film and Broadcast (successor to the National Legion of Decency), emphasized that the Catholic League is not an official agency of the church.

=== Dogma ===
The year 1999 saw the release of Kevin Smith's controversial film Dogma. Smith was a practicing Catholic, as Kevin Smith confirmed in an interview on the film's DVD. Several religious groups, especially the Catholic League, said the film was anti-Catholic and blasphemous, and organized protests, including one that took place at the October 4 premiere of the film at Lincoln Center in New York City.

Smith said that several of the protests occurred before the film was even finished, suggesting that the protests were more about media attention for the groups than for whatever was controversial about the film. The Catholic League's main complaints were that the film's main character is supposedly a descendant of Mary, who happens to work in an abortion clinic, which were seen as ironic conventions for a Catholic. The film's distributor, Miramax, removed its name from the production, and hired attorney Dan Petrocelli to defend it publicly. Petrocelli accused Donohue of trying to stir a violent reaction to the film. Donohue responded by taking out an op-ed ad in the New York Times on September 12, 1999, quoting attempts by Petrocelli and Smith to stifle his free speech.

According to Smith, "[Donohue] actually invited me out to have a beer after making my life hell for six months."

=== The Passion of the Christ ===
Donohue is a staunch defender of Mel Gibson's film The Passion of the Christ. On the December 8, 2004, broadcast of Scarborough Country, he stated: "Hollywood is controlled by secular Jews who hate Christianity in general and Catholicism in particular. It's not a secret, OK? And I'm not afraid to say it. That's why they hate this movie. It's about Jesus Christ, and it's about truth. It's about the Messiah."

In Donohue's book, Secular Sabotage: How Liberals Are Destroying Religion and Culture in America, he responded to what he believed was a misrepresentation of his comments via taking them out of context. For example, in that same interview, he said the following: "You have got secular Jews. You have got a lot of ex-Catholic priests who hate the Catholic Church, wacko Protestants in the same group." Later in the debate, in that same segment of the interview, he said, "There are secularists from every ethnic and religious stock," emphasizing that when people talk about Hollywood, they are "talking mostly about secular Jews."

In his book, Donohue also wrote the following: "The Forward, a Jewish weekly, published an editorial in 2004 saying it was merely a 'sociological observation' to note that 'Jews run Hollywood.' The newspaper quite rightly said that to say 'the Jews run Hollywood' is an entirely different matter, one that smacks of anti-Semitism. So it concluded that 'No, 'the Jews' don't run Hollywood. But Jews do, just as Koreans predominate in New York dry-cleaning and blacks rule in basketball.'"

=== Bush holiday cards ===
After US President George W. Bush used the term "Holidays" instead of "Christmas" on the White House 2005 Christmas cards, Donohue stated "The Bush administration has suffered a loss of will and ... they have capitulated to the worst elements in our culture."

=== John Edwards campaign staffers ===
Donohue demanded that John Edwards fire two of his presidential campaign staffers in February 2007, charging that they were "anti-Catholic, vulgar, trash-talking bigots." He cited a blog written by Amanda Marcotte regarding the church's opposition to birth control, saying it forces women "to bear more tithing Catholics". He also cited another posting called "Pope and Fascists". Donohue also objected to one of the staffers describing President Bush's "wingnut Christofacist base".

Donohue called the statements "incendiary" and "inflammatory", saying, "It's scurrilous and has no place being part of someone's resume who's going to work for a potential presidential contender." On February 8, John Edwards addressed the writings of the staffers, Amanda Marcotte and Melissa McEwan, saying "that kind of intolerant language will not be permitted from anyone on my campaign, whether it's intended as satire, humor or anything else." Donohue insisted that Edwards fire the pair immediately.

After the complaints, Marcotte wrote, "The Christian version of the virgin birth is generally interpreted as super-patriarchal where God is viewed as so powerful he can impregnate without befouling himself by touching a woman, and women are nothing but vessels." After Marcotte parted with the campaign, Donohue stated, "It is not enough that one foul-mouthed anti-Christian bigot, Amanda Marcotte, has quit. Melissa McEwan must go as well. Either Edwards shows her the door or she bolts on her own. There is no third choice – the Catholic League will see to it that this issue won't go away." He continued, "The Edwards campaign is in total disarray and the meltdown will continue unless McEwan is removed from his staff. The fact that Marcotte had to quit suggests that Edwards doesn't have the guts to do what is morally right." McEwan resigned on February 13, 2007, citing the hostility of the Catholic League and emails threatening rape and murder.

=== Kathy Griffin ===
On September 8, 2007, Kathy Griffin won her first Emmy for season two of reality show Kathy Griffin: My Life on the D-List. Griffin stirred up controversy with her acceptance speech, saying that "a lot of people come up here and thank Jesus for this award. I want you to know that no one had less to do with this award than Jesus. He didn't help me a bit." She went on to hold up her Emmy and say, "Suck it, Jesus, this award is my god now!"

Her remarks were quickly condemned by Donohue, who urged the TV academy to "denounce Griffin's obscene and blasphemous comment." After the Academy of Television Arts & Sciences decided to censor Griffin's remark, Donohue said, "The Academy of Television Arts & Sciences reacted responsibly to our criticism of Kathy Griffin's verbal assault on 85 percent of the US population. The ball is now in Griffin's court. The self-described 'complete militant atheist' needs to make a swift and unequivocal apology to Christians. If she does, she will get this issue behind her. If she does not, she will be remembered as a foul-mouthed bigot for the rest of her life."

In a statement issued by her publicist, Griffin responded to the denouncement by the Catholic League with a question: "Am I the only Catholic left with a sense of humor?"

=== The Golden Compass ===
As part of a two-month protest campaign, Donohue called for a boycott of the film The Golden Compass, believing that while the religious elements of the film would be "watered down" from the source novels, the film would still encourage children to read the series, which Donohue says "denigrates Christianity" and promotes "atheism for kids", citing author Philip Pullman as saying that he is "trying to undermine the basis of Christian belief." Donohue hopes that "the film [will fail] to meet box office expectations and that [Pullman's] books attract few buyers." The call for a boycott resulted in action by some Catholic groups in the US and Canada, and a Catholic school board in Ontario has ordered the source novel removed from its library shelves. Pullman has since said that the books do not have a religious agenda, saying of Donohue's call for a boycott, "Why don't we trust readers? Why don't we trust filmgoers? Oh, it causes me to shake my head with sorrow that such nitwits could be loose in the world." Pullman described the Catholic League as "a tiny, unrepresentative organisation," suggesting that "the only person Bill Donohue represents is himself."

A lay person who reviews movies for the bishops' conference gave the movie high marks, but after the protest by the Catholic League, the bishops ordered this review to be withdrawn.

Other evangelical groups, such as The Christian Film and Television Commission, adopted a "wait-and-see" approach to the film before deciding upon any action, as did the Roman Catholic Church in Britain.

Some commentators indicated that they believed the criticism would prove ultimately impotent and that the negative publicity would prove a boon for the film's box office.

According to Donohue, this prediction proved to be false. The movie did so poorly at the box office, Donohue says, that Pullman decided not to go forward with the sequels and blamed Donohue for his decision.

Donohue's position on this controversy was spelled out in a 31-page booklet, "The Golden Compass: Agenda Unmasked". It details his objections to what he said were Pullman's anti-Catholic comments, his books, and the movie.

=== Eucharist incident ===
In July 2008, a controversy arose surrounding a Communion rite altercation involving Webster Cook, a student and member of the University of Central Florida (UCF) student senate. Cook attended a Catholic Mass on campus and was given the Eucharist but walked out without consuming it. This action was allegedly related to his protest of the use of public funds for organized worship in the student union hall. According to Donohue, Cook's actions were a form of desecration of the sacrament. Cook was proposed for censure by the student senate and was criticized by local media. He also received numerous death threats.

On his blog Pharyngula, biologist and University of Minnesota Morris (UMM) professor PZ Myers publicly expressed support for Cook as well as outrage that Fox News appeared to be inciting readers to cause further problems for the student. Myers invited readers to acquire some consecrated Eucharistic Hosts, which he described as "crackers", for him to treat "with profound disrespect."

The Catholic League accused Myers of anti-Catholic bigotry and asked UMM and the Minnesota State Legislature to take action against Myers. Myers then also received threats and hate mail. The Catholic League also called for Cook to be expelled from the university, with Donohue describing his confiscation of the Eucharist as a hate crime as well as a form of kidnapping. Donohue also accused those who supported Cook of anti-Catholic bigotry, and sent a letter to the UCF asking them to take legal action against Cook. A week after the initial communion Cook apologized and returned the Host. The Catholic League, however, continued to lobby the university for his expulsion.

=== Boycott of Roger Smith Hotel ===
In March 2007, a sculpture created by the Italian-Canadian artist Cosimo Cavallaro was to be displayed at Manhattan's Roger Smith Hotel. The sculpture, entitled "My Sweet Lord", was of a crucified Christ, nude, in molded chocolate. Although the artist is a practicing Catholic, Bill Donohue decried the work as "hate speech", "garbage", and "one of the worst assaults on Christian sensibilities ever," describing Cavallaro as a "loser artist" and telling him in a television interview on Anderson Cooper 360, "You're lucky I'm not like the Taliban, because you would lose more than your head."

Under the leadership of Donohue, the Catholic League organized a boycott of the hotel aimed at forcing it to remove the statue. The hotel's management stating that the protests "brought to our attention the unintended reaction of you and other conscientious friends", eventually agreed to the league's calls, prompting the curator of the gallery, Matt Semler, to resign in protest. Semler said the six-foot sculpture was the victim of "a strong-arming from people who haven't seen the show, seen what we're doing. They jumped to conclusions completely contrary to our intentions."

=== Church child sex abuse issue ===
Donohue said, in October 2009, that the Catholic Church has a "homosexual", not a "pedophilia", problem, citing the John Jay Report. The Catholic League has blamed the Survivors Network of those Abused by Priests (SNAP), for having "hired, hidden, defended, enabled, ignored and concealed the crimes of child molesters." The Catholic League defended attacking SNAP on the grounds that they were "a menace to the Catholic Church."

In a November 18, 2009, Politics Daily column about Smith's research, David Gibson reported that sexual identity should be "separated from the problem of sexual abuse," according to criminologist Margaret Smith. Smith said, "we do not find a connection between homosexual identity and an increased likelihood of sexual abuse." Nevertheless, Donohue says that this is a homosexual problem in the Catholic Church and not a pedophile one.

Donohue has been asked to respond to Smith's position many times. He argues that "if the acts were of a homosexual nature, and we know they were, it does not matter what the self-perception of the victimizers were."

==== Irish Child Abuse Commission ====
On May 20, 2009, Reuters reported the results of a nine-year investigation by the Commission to Inquire into Child Abuse, which looked into decades of endemic sexual abuse against children in Catholic-run reform schools in Ireland. In reaction to this report, popularly known as the Ryan Report, Donohue issued a statement downplaying the seriousness of the cases, questioning the inclusion of voyeurism and "inappropriate sexual talk" as instances of sexual abuse along with the more serious charge of rape. Donohue said that rape constituted only 12 percent of the listed sexual abuse cases in the Ryan report, and that priests committed only 12 percent of the listed rapes – the other 88 percent were committed by laypersons and religious brothers.

Since the Ryan Report was released, Donohue has been defending the church and saying that much of the outrage is "moral hysteria". While stating that he agrees that rape and physical abuse are wrong and that he would not defend those actions, he says the report has conflated these abuses with "lesser" forms of punishment and is therefore not as serious. He also says many of the purported forms of abuse found by the commission were present and acceptable in the time period.

The Irish politician and child rape victim Colm O'Gorman was highly critical of such statements made by Donohue on the Irish radio show The Last Word. O'Gorman later wrote that Donohue's analysis was shockingly "simplistic".

=== Bon Secours Mother and Baby Home ===
In 2014, in the face of a public pressure campaign calling for the Commission of Investigation into Mother and Baby Homes and certain related matters in Ireland, Bill Donohue began his own campaign to challenge the prevailing narrative, going so far as to author a special report on the subject. Donohue largely dismissed the critics as being motivated by politics or liking "to bash the Church." Donohue took exception with the findings presented by Catherine Corless, who he described as "an amateur historian." Donohue and Corless debated on Irish radio, and he wrote extensively challenging her work and her credentials. Additionally, Donohue found flaws with how the media portrayed the mass graves found at the Mother and Baby Home, claiming that "the statement issued by the Mother and Baby Commission was disturbing, but it never mentioned anything about a mass grave." From 2014 to 2017, Donohue issued two special reports and numerous pieces exploring why he believed this story was evidence of anti-Catholicism.

=== Harry Knox and the White House faith-based office ===
When President Barack Obama named gay activist Harry Knox to the White House Office of Faith-Based and Neighborhood Partnerships in 2009, Donohue termed Knox "an anti-Catholic bigot who has called the pope a liar."

=== David Wojnarowicz and National Portrait Gallery ===
In November 2010, a portion of a video by the late artist David Wojnarowicz, which was included in an exhibit focused on gay-themed art, "Hide/Seek: Difference and Desire in American Portraiture" at the National Portrait Gallery, was removed after complaints from the Catholic League. Columnist Frank Rich said of the intervention and removal that the Smithsonian had been "bullied by bigots" and quoted the Los Angeles Times art critic, Christopher Knight, to the same effect. Tracing the evolution of the issue, Rich cited a piece by Kriston Capps which in turn said "the role of Penny Starr remains hazy. [However, a]...reporter and conservative advocate, [Starr] deserves much credit for both instigating" the negative attention to the piece of art amongst a number in the show.

Donohue's central complaint was the content of the "vile video", as he called it. He objected to the video because it showed "large ants eating away at Jesus on a crucifix," and was hosted in a museum funded by taxpayers.

=== Mortara case ===
Responding to David Kertzer's book and Alfred Uhry's play about the Mortara case, in which a Jewish boy was kidnapped on the order of the Supreme Sacred Congregation of the Roman and Universal Inquisition, the Catholic League charged: "Whether it's based on fact or fiction, or whether it’s portrayed on the stage or on the screen, the Catholic bashers are a busy lot these days. They are as good at twisting the facts as they are at developing fictional accounts. Truth doesn’t matter. What matters is results."

What Donohue said was as follows.

Why was Mortara baptized in the first place? Because the servant girl thought he was dying and was in need of salvation. Why was he taken from his family? Because it was the considered judgment of the Church at the time that a baptized Christian could not be raised in a Jewish home. He had to be removed lest the Church be party to apostasy. The validity of Baptism was also being tested. And so what happened to this poor kid? As he grew up he developed a father-son relationship with Pope Pius IX. He even became a priest.

=== Walt's Disenchanted Kingdom ===
In January 2023, the Catholic League released Walt's Disenchanted Kingdom. This documentary recounts the cultural shift at Disney. The film was written and directed by Jason Killian Meath. Bill Donohue served as the executive producer. It is hosted by Mercedes Schlapp and features interviews with Donohue, Tony Perkins, Ben Carson, Vivek Ramaswamy, Miranda Devine, Brent Bozell, David Horowitz, and Christian Toto. The film was initially released to SalemNow, YouTube, Rumble, and Amazon Prime Video.

Walt's Disenchanted Kingdom has been aired at several film festivals, including the Indie Short Fest where it won technical awards for "best editing" and "best sound editing" along with an Outstanding Achievement Award.

=== Los Angeles Dodgers ===
When the Los Angeles Dodgers planned their annual Pride Night in 2023, they invited the Sisters of Perpetual Indulgence, a charity group of gay men who dress up as nuns to bring attention to sexual intolerance and gender. The team received backlash from the Catholic League, Sen. Marco Rubio, and Catholic Vote. Catholic League president Bill Donohue sent a letter to commissioner Rob Manfred comparing the group's performances to blackface. The Dodgers subsequently disinvited the group, likely owing to the large Catholic population of the city. KNBC reported that "the Dodgers pulled the Sisters from their Pride Night the day after Bill Donohue, president and CEO of the Catholic League for Religious and Civil Rights, had emailed Major League Baseball Commissioner Rob Manfred to urge the team to yank the group."

In response, the Los Angeles LGBT Center, the ACLU, County Supervisor Lindsey Horvath, City Councilmember Eunisses Hernandez, State Senator Scott Wiener, and the Sisters called for the group to be reinvited, and the LGBT Center and LA Pride backed out of Pride Night. The nearby Los Angeles Angels even promised to invite the group to their Pride Night instead. However, the Dodgers reversed their decision on May 22, 2023, and announced the Sisters of Perpetual Indulgence were once again welcome at the event. The group accepted the team's apology.

Following the decision to reinvite the Sisters of Perpetual Indulgence, the Catholic League called for a boycott of the Dodgers' Pride Night. The Catholic League took out 50 radio ads on KABC and contacted many prominent stakeholders in Los Angeles. These efforts purportedly helped contribute to a dip in attendance for the game against the San Francisco Giants.

=== Gretchen Whitmer ===
In October 2024, Donohue criticized Michigan Governor Gretchen Whitmer after she posted an online video of a skit that mocked the Catholic sacrament of the Eucharist. Donohue said in performing the stunt Whitmer "insulted Catholics nationwide" and that "there is no way to understand this stunt other than as an expression of vintage anti-Catholic bigotry." He also criticized Whitmer's attempt to justify the skit saying "Whitmer's team, and her allies in the media, are trying to distort what she did."

=== Cos Cob School ===
In August 2022 Donohue spoke out after a hidden camera investigation by Project Veritas caught Jeremy Boland, assistant principal of Cos Cob Elementary School in Connecticut, admitting that he refused to hire Catholics. Donohue said that Boland was "spewing anti-Catholic vitriol" and demanded that he be immediately be fired. He also called for a full investigation of the school. Several other agencies had opened investigations into the matter, including the Connecticut Attorney General and the Cos Cob Superintendent of Schools Boland was put on administrative leave shortly after the Project Veritas video surfaced and resigned his position in June 2023.

=== 2024 Paris Olympics Stunt ===
In July 2024, Donohue spoke out against a controversial skit at the opening ceremony of the 2024 Summer Olympics in Paris where a group of drag queens staged a parody version of The Last Supper. In response, Donohue denounced the parody and sent a letter to Thomas Bach, the president of the International Olympic Committee asking for him to conduct an investigation into the stunt.

=== Carrie Prejean Boller ===
In February 2026, Donohue voiced concern with comments made former Miss California Carrie Prejean Boller, who was chosen by President Trump to be on his newly established Religious Liberty Commission. At a February 2026 hearing on anti-Semitism, Boller made controversial comments regarding the state of Israel while also wearing a Palestinian flag pin. Donohue requested that Boller be removed from the commission calling her comments "presumptuous." As a result of her comments, Boller was removed from the Commission on February 11.

=== Sean Hannity & Brian Kilmeade ===
Donohue criticized Fox News host Sean Hannity over comments he made on his April 16, 2026 show. Hannity claimed that he ""I left the Catholic church in large part due to the institutionalized corruption, and it was at the parish level, to the bishop level, cardinals, all the way to Rome." He also claimed that the scandal was "frankly not only unchecked, they never fully corrected it or dealt with it." In a statement, Donohue said Hannity's claims do not hold up to scrutiny, saying that between July 1, 2023 to June 30, 2024, only .004% of clergy members had a substantiated case of abuse made against them, compared to 4% of clergy between 1950 and 2002.

In April 2026, Donohue was critical of Fox News host Brian Kilmeade for false comments he made about Pope Pius XII's role in the Holocaust. Kilmeade claimed that "Pope Pius XII did nothing knowing, documents show that 6 million Jews were being slaughtered" and that the Vatican "signed a deal with the Nazis not to invade.” Donohue called Kilmeade "dead wrong" and provided evidence that Pope Pius XII helped save the lives of Jewish people.

=== Zohran Mamdani ===
Donohue has spoken out against New York City Mayor Zohran Mamdani. In February 2026, Donohue criticized Mamdani for not attending the installation of Archbishop of New York Ronald Hicks. Donohue responded by saying that "Mamdani's professed interest in diversity and inclusion obviously hits a brick wall when it comes to Catholics" and that "he wants nothing to do with them." Donohue also criticized Mamdani for his comments at a 2026 St. Patrick's Day event, where he made comments concerning Palestine. He criticized the mayor for turning a message about St. Patrick into "a radical Muslim rant."

On May 26, 2026, Donohue spoke at an interfaith rally against Mamdani at Gracie Mansion sponsored by the group End Jew Hatred. In his remarks, Donohue called out Mamdani's anti-Semitic ideologies and his hostility to religious liberty. In particular, he criticized Mamdani for his refusal to condemn recent attacks on Jewish synagogues and houses of worship in New York City.

On September 8, 2026, Donohue took part in two rallies protesting Mamdani's decision to attend the September 11 ceremony. The first rally was organized by families of victims of 9/11 and took place at New York City Hall. The second rally was sponsored by End Jew Hatred and took place outside the headquarters of the New York Democratic Socialists of America. At both rallies Donohue urged Mamdani to stay home from the September 11 memorial ceremony. He also called out Mamdani's concern for Islamophobia than for those who lost their lives in the attacks.

== Criticism ==
In 1997, David Carlin of Commonweal criticized Donohue and the Catholic League for being overly sensitive in the identification of anti-Catholicism. In 1999, the Jesuit priest James Martin, the associate editor of the Catholic magazine America wrote "Often their criticism is right on target, but frequently they speak without seeing or experiencing what they are critiquing, and that undercuts their credibility. Unfortunately, that type of response gives people the idea that the Catholic Church is unreflective." Andrew Ferguson argued that Donohue was doing the cause of anti-Catholicism a service by his overly aggressive tactics, arguing, "The Catholic League president is doing more to discredit the Catholic church than perhaps anyone else.".

Donohue responded to Ferguson in his book, The Truth about Clergy Sexual Abuse: Clarifying the Facts and the Causes. He criticized Ferguson for citing the Pennsylvania grand jury report of 2018 as though it was authoritative.

In fact, none of what is in a grand-jury report should be assumed to be factual.

Former Harvard Law professor Alan Dershowitz knows better:

“The grand jury has a specific function. It’s supposed to only indict or not indict. Indeed, prosecutors generally don’t issue reports for that reason because they only hear one side of the case. They don’t hear the other side. There’s no cross examination of witnesses. That’s why it is regarded as wrong for prosecutors to issue reports.”

It is precisely because grand-jury reports are not factual that the Catholic League filed an amicus brief challenging the right of the Pennsylvania grand-jury report to make public the names of eleven priests who claimed that doing so would violate their reputational rights as guaranteed by the state constitution. On December 3, 2018, our case, handled by Pittsburgh lawyers from Jones Day, won: the Pennsylvania Supreme Court ruled 6-1 in our favor. In November 2019, a Pennsylvania Supreme Court task force, which had been empaneled two years earlier, vindicated our effort: it recommended abolishing grand-jury reports.

== See also ==
- Anti-clericalism
- Alliance Defending Freedom
