= Bill Donohue =

American Catholic layman

- Born: William Anthony Donohue; July 18, 1947 (age 79); Manhattan, New York, U.S.
- Education: New York University (PhD)
- Occupation: President of the Catholic League

William Anthony Donohue (born July 18, 1947) is an American Catholic layman who has been president of the Catholic League in the United States since 1993.

== Life and career ==
Donohue was born in the borough of Manhattan in New York City. He began his teaching career in the 1970s working at St. Lucy's School in Spanish Harlem. In 1977, he took a teaching position at La Roche College in McCandless, Pennsylvania. In 1980, he received his doctorate in sociology from New York University. Donohue is divorced and has two adult children from his marriage.

His first book was The Politics of the American Civil Liberties Union. He became associated with the conservative Heritage Foundation, where he is an adjunct scholar.

While Donohue was in college in New York, Virgil C. Blum, a Jesuit at Marquette University in Milwaukee, Wisconsin, founded the Catholic League to counter anti-Catholicism in American culture. Blum died in 1990; in 1993, Donohue became the organization's director.

Donohue publishes The Catalyst, the Catholic League's journal. He formerly served on the board of directors of the National Association of Scholars. He serves on the board of advisers of the Washington Legal Foundation, the Howard Center for Family, Religion and Society, the Society of Catholic Social Scientists, Catholics United for the Faith, the Ave Maria Institute, the Christian Film and Television Commission and Catholic War Veterans. He received the 2005 St. Thomas More Award for Catholic Citizenship from Catholic Citizens of Illinois.

In 2022, Donohue was awarded an Honorary Doctorate of Laws from Ave Maria School of Law. He also gave the commencement address to the graduating class.

== Activism ==
Donohue campaigns against what he perceives as the discrimination and defamation of Catholics and Catholicism. In doing so he has targeted a diverse array of organizations and individuals in entertainment, politics, and the arts. His work has produced divergent assessments. Legatus Magazine, the monthly publication of an organization for Catholic business executives, wrote:

At 66 years old, Bill Donohue might just be the hardest-working man in the Catholic Church—with the exception of Pope Francis, of course. Not only has the New York City native been at the helm of the Catholic League for a full 20 years, but he is busy writing a new book—while regularly riding to the defense of Catholics across the country beset by a hostile culture and media.

USA Today once characterized Donohue, reporting that, "Donohue serves as Santa to his membership of 350,000 and Scrooge to those who run afoul of him." In 2000, an editorial in America, a Jesuit magazine, noted Donohue's bi-partisanship and willingness to break ranks with Republicans who aligned with him on most issues: "once he was cheered by Catholic neo-conservatives for attacking the media, the entertainment industry and pro-choice groups, now he was excommunicated as a loose cannon because he was shooting at their allies. Mr. Donohue's refusal to be controlled by either party is one of his most attractive qualities." One critic described him as an "identity politics ambulance chaser" and another said he represented a "right-wing publicity mill". Others found that his defense of Catholicism sometimes crossed into attacks on other groups, and he has been accused of homophobia or even "anti-gay bullying" and antisemitism.

=== Pedophilia ===
In 2025, Bill Donohue wrote an article asserting that pedophilia is limited to sexual attraction to prepubescent children, and therefore argued that sexual abuse of post-pubescent minors does not meet the clinical definition of pedophilia, despite remaining a serious crime.

=== Free speech ===
In 2015, Al-Qaeda in the Arabian Peninsula took responsibility for a terror attack on Charlie Hebdo that killed 17 people and wounded 12 in Paris, including the editor of Charlie Hebdo, who had been on an Al-Qaeda hit list. Commenting on the attack, Donohue wrote an article titled "Muslims are right to be angry":

What unites Muslims in their anger against Charlie Hebdo is the vulgar manner in which Muhammad has been portrayed. What they object to is being intentionally insulted over the course of many years. On this aspect, I am in total agreement with them. ...Stephane Charbonnier, the paper's publisher, was killed today in the slaughter. It is too bad that he didn't understand the role he played in his tragic death. In 2012, when asked why he insults Muslims, he said, 'Muhammad isn't sacred to me.' Had he not been so narcissistic, he may still be alive. Muhammad isn't sacred to me, either, but it would never occur to me to deliberately insult Muslims by trashing him.

In 2015, Donohue said on Fox News, "Self censorship is the friend of freedom" and that free speech should not permit "obscene portrayal of religious figures". Hugh Hewitt, a conservative Catholic talk show host, called Donohue "an embarrassment" to Catholics for his statement, saying "You blamed the victim before their bodies were cold" and "You are standing over the bodies of twelve dead people, including two policemen, one yesterday and one today, who knows who else is going to get killed in France during the course of this thing, and you are saying they were justified because they were insulted".

However, author Timothy J. Gordon observed that "Donohue came prepared to defend his statement in a logical and genteel (at least initially) manner" while Hewitt sounded "beleaguered and clearly intellectually overmatched." Gordon concludes that "one remains unconvinced that outfits like Hewitt or Fox News—throughout all their abuse of Donohue, as well as their full-hearted self-congratulations for their own stance, last week—will deal with Islam in any more subtle or sophisticated a way than Donohue."

John Bacon noted in USA Today that Pope Francis made a related argument at the time. Bacon quoted the pope as saying, "It's normal, you cannot provoke. You cannot insult the faith of others. You cannot make fun of the faith of others. There is a limit. Every religion has its dignity." In this light, Donohue's comments are more in keeping with a traditional Catholic worldview.

=== The Pope ===
In 2015, in response to Laudato si', Donohue described Pope Francis as "the ultimate maverick" on The Alan Colmes Show, saying "the left is going to like the fact that he has more of a socialist model in terms of his vision of the structure of the economy. He's anti-market in the encyclical." Donohue criticised The New York Times editorial board, saying they want "the pope to shove his teachings down" the throats of Republican legislators.

=== Marriage ===
Donohue believes marriage is "not about love" or "making people happy" but that one fundamental and inextricable purpose of marriage is to have a family.

=== Sexual abuse by priests ===
In 2009, after the release of the official report of the Ryan Commission, whose findings included multiple instances of rape and persuasive evidence of endemic sexual, emotional, and physical abuse throughout the Catholic School system in Ireland, Donohue publicly denied these criminal charges and characterized the media response to the Ryan Report as "hysterical". He argued that most offenses occurred before 1970 when "corporal punishment", as Donohue termed it, was not thought unacceptable, and referred to the victims as "miscreants". He noted the report's broad definitions of abuse, which included neglect and emotional abuse. Since the majority of priests are not rapists, he judged news headlines like Reuters' "Irish Priests Beat, Raped Children" were "wild and irresponsible", regardless of whether or not the headlines were true. He blamed the report and the journalists in turn.

On March 30, 2010, Donohue appeared on CNN's Larry King Live on a panel discussing sexual abuse of children by priests. Donohue contended that the decades-old problem consisted mostly of offenses involving post-pubescent boys aged 12 or more, which offenses therefore, according to Donohue, should be considered the acts of homosexual priests, rather than the actions of pedophiles. (Note: A Commonweal story discussed the available statistics and the use of the term postpubescent. It quoted a well-known study: "The largest group of alleged victims (50.9%) was between the ages of 11 and 14, 27.3% were 15–17, 16% were 8–10 and nearly 6% were under age 7. Overall, 81% of victims were male and 19% female." It concluded that since "73 percent of all victims were under 14 years of age", the label pedophilia was appropriate and the label homosexual was not.) Donohue also pointed to the independent John Jay Report, which stated that 81% of the victims were male and 78% were post pubescent.

In August 2018, Donohue responded to a report by a Pennsylvania grand jury that revealed rampant sexual abuse of children by some 300 priests by stating that the victims weren't raped because they were only groped, not penetrated.

"There is no ongoing crisis," he tweeted. "In fact, there is no institution, private or public, that has less of a problem with the sexual abuse of minors today than the Catholic Church." Several individuals quickly condemned his statement; John Podhoretz, editor of Commentary magazine, said, "Bill Donohue's soul quickly leaked out of his body." Jim Lokay, an anchor for Fox affiliate WTTG-TV in Washington, D.C., tweeted that the Catholic League's statement was "One of the most shameful, ignorant, tone-deaf, arrogant tweets I've ever seen."

Donohue was so incensed by these attacks that he wrote a book arguing that by 2018, the Catholic Church had indeed posted the best record on handling cases of the sexual abuse of minors of any institution in the United States. He amassed over 800 footnotes in his book, The Truth about Clergy Sexual Abuse: Clarifying the Facts and the Causes, to demonstrate the validity of his position.

=== Television and film ===
In 1995, Donohue, joined by evangelical leaders, called for a boycott of Disney for distributing the British film Priest, which depicted one priest struggling with his homosexuality and another involved in an affair with a woman. Donohue said the film was "designed intentionally to insult the Catholic Church and Catholics nationwide". The boycott had no impact, but helped Disney recognize the market for entertainment with religious themes.

For months in 1997 Donohue promoted a boycott of the advertisers of the television show Nothing Sacred, the story of "a sexy Catholic priest, Father Ray, who sometimes doubts his faith". Cardinal Roger Mahony of Los Angeles and the National Catholic Reporter opposed Donohue's efforts. Some advertisers stopped placing ads with the show because of the controversy, but the show found replacements.

One study of the show said that the television series The Simpsons presented Catholicism with humor that had an "undeniably hostile, sometimes gratuitous edge to it" for years. Donohue objected to some dialogue in a November 1998 episode (Note: The child Bart asks his mother if their family can become Catholic and she replies: "No one is going Catholic. Three children is enough, thank you.") and other material in a January 1999 show that, in his view, made Catholicism the butt of a joke. In one case network executives substituted the name of a Protestant denomination for Catholic in later rebroadcasts.

In 1999, before the release of Kevin Smith's film Dogma, Donohue reported that he had read the script and found it objectionable. (Note: The plot concerned a pair of angels "banished from heaven to Wisconsin" who devise a scheme to win re-admittance to heaven.) He said: "Quite naturally, the actors and film critics who like the movie are not disturbed by the anti-Catholicism that they themselves acknowledge, however unwittingly." After viewing the film in November, he wrote:

That film critics like The New York Times reviewer, Janet Maslin, and Time magazine's Richard Corliss, thought it a gas means either that they will laugh at anything, or they can't resist giving high marks to any movie that insults Catholicism. The only way to find out for sure is for someone in Hollywood to make a stupid comedy that insults Protestants or Jews (preferably both), and then run it by the likes of Maslin and Corliss.

Smith later said that the film proved less offensive than its critics had anticipated and that Donohue "actually invited me out to have a beer after making my life hell for six months".

In December 2004, Donohue discussed Mel Gibson's movie The Passion of the Christ. During a discussion of the film on the television show Scarborough Country, Donohue said:

Hollywood is controlled by secular Jews who hate Christianity in general and Catholicism in particular. It's not a secret, OK? And I'm not afraid to say it. That's why they hate this movie. It's about Jesus Christ, and it's about truth. It's about the Messiah.

When Rabbi Shmuley Boteach responded calling Donohue's statement "anti-Semitic garbage", and saying: "I have got to tell you that Bill Donohue ... ought to be ashamed of himself, the way he’s spoken about secular Jews hating Christians. That is a bunch of crap, OK?”, Donohue said:

In short, I did not single out secular Jews as some have said. Nonetheless, I do regret using the verb "controlled", and that is because it suggests that there is some kind of cabal among secular Jews. That's nonsense. But is there a segment of the secular Jewish community that is anti-Catholic? Absolutely.

In November 2005, he criticized an episode of CSI: Crime Scene Investigation for promoting "a pro-abortion rights agenda by portraying those who are opposed to abortion as religious nuts not to be taken seriously".

In the spring of 2006, after Comedy Central refused to allow its animated television series South Park to show an image of Muhammad, Donohue said the show's creators Trey Parker and Matt Stone, whom he had frequently criticized, should have protested that censorship by resigning, but instead "Like little whores, they'll sit there and grab the bucks. They'll sit there and they'll whine and they'll take their shot at Jesus. That's their stock in trade." The next season, South Park parodied Donohue in the episode "Fantastic Easter Special". The episode depicts Donohue as a power-hungry Catholic official who usurps the Pope and sentences Jesus to death as a heretic; he is eventually killed by Jesus. Donohue took the episode in good humor, displaying a still from it in his office depicting him wearing the pope's miter. Describing the episode's plot to The New York Times, he said "... they have me overthrow the pope because the pope is a wimp, and then I take over the church and give it some guts. ...But in the end, Jesus kills me."

Donohue, along with a number of other religious leaders, criticized the children's fantasy epic The Golden Compass. Donohue said that the trilogy of books on which the screenplay was based, His Dark Materials, "denigrate Christianity, thrash the Catholic Church and sell the virtues of atheism". Though the film eliminated what he found offensive, he deemed it a "stealth campaign" to sell the books to readers unaware of their content. The impact of the resulting controversy on the film's commercial performance was uncertain.

=== War on Christmas ===
Donohue has regularly campaigned against the secularization of Christmas, which he describes as "the diluting and dumbing down of the cultural and religious significance of Christmas." An Associated Press story once explained: "As it is for millions of people, Christmas is Bill Donohue's busy season. While others spend time wrapping and shopping, Donohue stays busy sniping." He described the challenge: "It's political correctness run amok. Every day I'm putting out a statement about the latest absurdity. ...This time of year, you can just bank on it."

In December 2005, he criticized Christmas cards sent by U.S. President George W. Bush for using the term "holiday season" and not mentioning "Christmas". He said: "This clearly demonstrates that the Bush administration has suffered a loss of will and that they have capitulated to the worst elements in our culture." In 2010, after an atheists organization used a billboard at the entrance to the Lincoln Tunnel to display the message "You KNOW it's a myth!" across the scene of the magi traveling to the manger at Bethlehem, the Catholic League responded with a billboard of its own. Donohue said "We can't enjoy the Christmas season without someone trying to dumb it down or neuter it" and added: "Talk about a myth. They believe in nothing. They stand for nothing. They think we came from nothing. They're the ones who really are living in some other hollow world."

In 2013, he announced plans for a billboard reading "Send Modern-Day Scrooges a Message: Celebrate the Prince of Peace". As "a tongue-in-cheek statement against political correctness", he proposed a list of "Office Party Rules to Ignore" that included eliminating dress rules so women could display cleavage and scheduling the affair for a Friday to encourage alcohol consumption. It concluded: "We happen to be Irish Catholics, a lot of us here, we're going to play to the stereotype."

In December 2023, Donohue announced that the Catholic League placed a billboard in New York's Times Square that offered a positive message at Christmastime. The billboard, featuring an image of the Holy family, read, "Celebrate Religious Diversity; Celebrate Christmas!"

In December 2024 Donohue and the League placed another billboard in Wisconsin's capital of Madison. The billboard, which was a response to the Freedom from Religion Foundation's winter solstice display in the Wisconsin State Capitol, read that "Atheists strike out at Christmas" and that "Celebrating Winter Solstice is a Child's Game."

=== Homosexuality ===
Donohue has been a consistent critic of same-sex marriage.

In 2010, Frank Rich said that when Donohue extended his criticism of an art exhibit from one work he considered anti-religious and complained that it included "pornographic images of gay men", he "was just using his 'religious' objections as a perfunctory cover for the homophobia actually driving his complaint".

=== Walt's Disenchanted Kingdom ===
In January 2023, the Catholic League released Walt's Disenchanted Kingdom. This documentary recounts the cultural shift at Disney. The film was written and directed by Jason Killian Meath. Bill Donohue served as the executive producer. It is hosted by Mercedes Schlapp and features interviews with Donohue, Tony Perkins, Ben Carson, Vivek Ramaswamy, Miranda Devine, Brent Bozell, David Horowitz, and Christian Toto. The film was initially released to SalemNow, YouTube, Rumble, and Amazon Prime Video.

Walt's Disenchanted Kingdom has been aired at several film festivals, including the Indie Short Fest where it won technical awards for "best editing" and "best sound editing" along with an Outstanding Achievement Award.

=== Los Angeles Dodgers ===
When the Los Angeles Dodgers planned their annual Pride Night in 2023, they invited the Sisters of Perpetual Indulgence, a charity group of gay men who dress up as nuns to bring attention to sexual intolerance and gender. The team received backlash from the Catholic League, Sen. Marco Rubio, and Catholic Vote. Catholic League president Bill Donohue sent a letter to commissioner Rob Manfred comparing the group's performances to blackface. The Dodgers subsequently disinvited the group, likely owing to the large Catholic population of the city. KNBC reported that "the Dodgers pulled the Sisters from their Pride Night the day after Bill Donohue, president and CEO of the Catholic League for Religious and Civil Rights, had emailed Major League Baseball Commissioner Rob Manfred to urge the team to yank the group."

In response, the Los Angeles LGBT Center, the ACLU, County Supervisor Lindsey Horvath, City Councilmember Eunisses Hernandez, State Senator Scott Wiener, and the Sisters called for the group to be reinvited, and the LGBT Center and LA Pride backed out of Pride Night. The nearby Los Angeles Angels even promised to invite the group to their Pride Night instead. However, the Dodgers reversed their decision on May 22, 2023 and announced the Sisters of Perpetual Indulgence were once again welcome at the event. The group accepted the team's apology.

=== 2016 Anthony Weiner sexting scandal ===
Bill Donohue has stated he played a critical role in triggering the FBI's investigation of Anthony Weiner's laptop resulting in the discovery of thousands of Hillary Clinton's emails. After seeing lewd photos of Weiner with his toddler son sleeping next to him in the New York Post, Donohue filed a complaint with the New York City branch of the New York State Office of Children and Family Services (ACS) asking for an investigation of Weiner for exploiting his young child. On September 26, Donohue says he was informed by ACS that his complaint had been accepted and that Weiner would be investigated. A week after Donohue's complaint had been accepted, the FBI seized Weiner's electronic devices and found thousands of Hillary Clinton's emails, prompting FBI director James Comey to reopen that investigation late into the 2016 US presidential election. Hillary Clinton has cited Comey's decision as one reason why she lost the election to Trump.

=== Bon Secours Mother and Baby Home ===
In 2014, in the face of a public pressure campaign calling for the Commission of Investigation into Mother and Baby Homes and certain related matters in Ireland, Bill Donohue began his own campaign to challenge the prevailing narrative, going so far as to author a special report on the subject. Donohue largely dismissed the critics as being motivated by politics or liking "to bash the Church." Donohue took exception with the findings presented by Catherine Corless, who he described as "an amateur historian." Donohue and Corless debated on Irish radio, and he wrote extensively challenging her work and her credentials. Additionally, Donohue found flaws with how the media portrayed the mass graves found at the Mother and Baby Home, claiming that "the statement issued by the Mother and Baby Commission was disturbing, but it never mentioned anything about a mass grave." From 2014 to 2017, Donohue issued two special reports and numerous pieces exploring why he believed this story was evidence of anti-Catholicism.

=== Politics ===
Early in the 2000 presidential campaign, Donohue criticized President George W. Bush for appearing at Bob Jones University, whose head once called Catholicism "the religion of the Antichrist and a satanic system." He welcomed Bush's letter of apology for failing to make his opposition to the school's anti-Catholicism clear, saying: "One of the great touchstones of Catholicism is forgiveness for the wrongdoer who admits that he or she is wrong, and there's nothing to be gained by beating this dead horse." He also criticized some of his co-religionists: "There are some Catholics who are so desperate to get a Republican back in the White House, they're willing to overlook anything. Our feeling is, let the pus come to the surface." He raised a similar issue a few weeks later when the Republican leadership of the U.S. House of Representatives appointed a Protestant chaplain rather than the Catholic priest who received the greatest support from the bipartisan committee charged with the selection. Donohue ignored suggestions that he was not helping calm the situation by protesting. He said: "There is a segment of the evangelical Protestant community that is anti-Catholic. It has been there for a long, long time. Everyone is saying, 'Let's not talk about it.' I don't want a strain between Catholics and Protestants, but I'm not going to paper this over." Within a few weeks, the Protestant chaplain withdrew and Hastert appointed the House's first Catholic chaplain, though not the original candidate.

Later in 2000, he condemned Patrick Buchanan for launching his presidential campaign at Bob Jones: "Buchanan is not alone among Catholics who have no problem recognizing anti-Catholicism when it stems from the academy or Hollywood, but are utterly unable to do so when it comes from their 'friends.' The Catholic League does not suffer from this disability and that is why we will continue to denounce anti-Catholic bigotry independent of its origins." By contrast, he excused John Ashcroft for accepting an honorary degree before Bob Jones' views became widely known.

In December 2007, he objected to a television commercial that former Arkansas governor Mike Huckabee was using in his campaign for the Republican presidential nomination. The ad showed the candidate seated in front of a stained glass window that displayed, in Donohue's view, an image of the cross while Huckabee described the importance of Christmas and family. Donohue said: "This is just injecting religion into politics even too far for guys like me." He believed Huckabee was identifying his religion to attack Mitt Romney's Mormon faith.

During the 2008 presidential race, Donohue called for Obama to disband his campaign's Catholic National Advisory Council, which he said represented only "dissident Catholics," most with perfect ratings from the National Abortion Rights Action League.

In March 2009, he criticized President Obama's selection of Kansas Governor Kathleen Sebelius to head the Department of Health and Human Services calling her "one of the most extreme pro-abortion zealots in the nation".

In June 2016, following the close of the New York State legislature without action on legislation designed to help survivors of childhood sexual abuse, Donohue wrote: "The bill was sold as justice for the victims of sexual abuse, when, in fact, it was a sham: the proposed legislation that failed to make it to the floor of the New York State legislature in the wee hours of Saturday ... was a vindictive bill pushed by lawyers and activists out to rape the Catholic Church."

In February 2026, Donohue voiced concern with comments made former Miss California Carrie Prejean Boller, who was chosen by President Trump to be on his newly established Religious Liberty Commission. At a February 2026 hearing on anti-Semitism, Boller made controversial comments regarding the state of Israel while also wearing a Palestinian flag pin. Donohue requested that Boller be removed from the commission calling her comments "presumptuous." As a result of her comments, Boller was removed from the Commission on February 11.

Donohue has spoken out against New York City Mayor Zohran Mamdani. In February 2026, Donohue criticized Mamdani for not attending the installation of Archbishop of New York Ronald Hicks. Donohue responded by saying that "Mamdani's professed interest in diversity and inclusion obviously hits a brick wall when it comes to Catholics" and that "he wants nothing to do with them." Donohue also criticized Mamdani for his comments at a 2026 St. Patrick's Day event, where he made comments concerning Palestine. He criticized the mayor for turning a message about St. Patrick into "a radical Muslim rant."

On May 26, 2026, Donohue spoke at an interfaith rally against Mamdani at Gracie Mansion sponsored by the group End Jew Hatred. In his remarks, Donohue attacked Mamdani's alleged anti-Semitic ideology and hostility to religious liberty. In particular, he criticized Mamdani for his refusal to condemn recent attacks on Jewish synagogues and houses of worship in New York City.

On September 8, 2026, Donohue took part in two rallies protesting Mamdani's decision to attend the September 11 ceremony. The first rally was organized by families of victims of 9/11 and took place at New York City Hall. The second rally was sponsored by End Jew Hatred and took place outside the headquarters of the New York Democratic Socialists of America. At both rallies Donohue urged Mamdani to stay home from the September 11 memorial ceremony. He also called out Mamdani's concern for Islamophobia than for those who lost their lives in the attacks.

=== Catholic higher education ===
Donohue called the decision of the University of Notre Dame to award an honorary degree to President Obama in 2009 "a slap in the face to the bishops" of the U.S. "given what the bishops have clearly asked of Catholic institutions".

=== Anti-Catholicism ===
He protested against what he considers employment discrimination against Catholics, in the case of a woman required by her supervisor to remove the Ash Wednesday ashes from her forehead in 2005. In 2007, when a substitute high school teacher in Georgia wiped the ashes from a student's forehead and berated her, Donohue called for the teacher to be disciplined. When school officials reported that the teacher had been "counseled and cautioned", Donohue called the teacher's behavior "morally reprehensible" and asked state education officials to investigate the incident.

He faulted the owners of the Empire State Building for failing to honor Mother Teresa in 2010 and Cardinal Timothy Dolan in 2012. He said: "There's no question that they're much more at home honoring mass murderers there at the Empire State Building and I'm not being facetious. They honored Mao Zedong and others for the 60th anniversary of the Communist Revolution here a few years ago, who took with him 77 million innocent Chinese men, women, and children".

In October 2024, Donohue criticized Michigan Governor Gretchen Whitmer after she posted an online video of a skit that mocked the Catholic sacrament of the Eucharist. Donohue said in performing the stunt Whitmer "insulted Catholics nationwide" and that "there is no way to understand this stunt other than as an expression of vintage anti-Catholic bigotry." He also criticized Whitmer's attempt to justify the skit saying "Whitmer's team, and her allies in the media, are trying to distort what she did."

In August 2022 Donohue spoke out after a hidden camera investigation by Project Veritas caught Jeremy Boland, assistant principal of Cos Cob Elementary School in Connecticut, admitting that he refused to hire Catholics. Donohue said that Boland was "spewing anti-Catholic vitriol" and demanded that he be immediately be fired. He also called for a full investigation of the school. Several other agencies had opened investigations into the matter, including the Connecticut Attorney General and the Cos Cob Superintendent of Schools Boland was put on administrative leave shortly after the Project Veritas video surfaced and resigned his position in June 2023.

In July 2024, Donohue spoke out against a controversial skit at the opening ceremony of the 2024 Summer Olympics in Paris where a group of drag queens staged a parody version of The Last Supper. In response, Donohue denounced the parody and sent a letter to Thomas Bach, the president of the International Olympic Committee asking for him to conduct an investigation into the stunt.

=== Public art ===
In 1999, Donohue called for people to picket the Brooklyn Museum of Art to protest its display of a painting by Chris Ofili titled The Holy Virgin Mary that, according to The New York Times, depicted "a black Madonna with a clump of elephant dung on one breast and cutouts of genitalia from pornographic magazines in the background".

On November 30, 2010, Donohue denounced a piece of video art, A Fire in My Belly by David Wojnarowicz, that was included in an exhibition of gay and lesbian portraiture at the Smithsonian Institution's National Portrait Gallery. The piece included a scene with ants crawling on a crucifix. Donohue called the video "anti-Christian hate speech" and called for its removal, which the Smithsonian did. Frank Rich described the work as consistent with the use of religious imagery in the Western tradition: "A crucifix is besieged by ants that evoke frantic souls scurrying in panic as a seemingly impassive God looked on." During an interview with National Public Radio about the incident, Donohue questioned the Smithsonian's status as a tax-supported institution:

Why should the working class pay for the leisure of the elite when in fact one of the things the working class likes to do for leisure is to go to professional wrestling? And if I suggested we should have federal funds for professional wrestling to lower the cost of the ticket, people would think I'm insane. I don't go to museums any more than any Americans do.

The Association of Art Museum Directors called the Smithsonian's decision "extremely regrettable", and Olga Viso, director of the Walker Art Center and formerly of the Smithsonian, said her former employer had "perhaps lost touch with some of the core principles and spirit of its establishment". One of the exhibit's curators said that Donohue represented an anti-Semitic hate group that viewed gays and lesbians as "raw meat" in the culture wars.

In 2012, a Manhattan art gallery displayed "Immersion (Piss Christ)", a photograph by Andres Serrano that depicts a small plastic crucifix submerged in the artist's urine. Donohue protested at a news conference outside the gallery and was then denied admission. He pointed out that the Obama administration had recently criticized a film critical of Islam, Innocence of Muslims, but said nothing about Serrano's work. He made his own video of an Obama bobblehead doll with a brown substance, actually "brown Play-Doh", he said, to demonstrate "that the cultural and political elite are basically secularist; they don't believe in God." Pointing to the jar in the video he said: "This is their god."

=== Individuals ===
Donohue has had a long-running dispute with political and social commentator Bill Maher.

Comedian Kathy Griffin in her 2007 Primetime Emmy acceptance speech, mocked award recipients who thanked God when accepting awards by saying "So all I can say is suck it, Jesus, this award is my god now!" Donohue called her language "obscene and blasphemous" and said: "It is a sure bet that if Griffin had said, 'Suck it, Muhammad,' there would have been a very different reaction".

In 2010, after the openly gay pop star Elton John described Jesus as a "compassionate, super-intelligent gay man who understood human problems", Donohue objected:

Jesus was certainly compassionate, but to say he was 'super-intelligent' is to compare the son of God to a successful game-show contestant. More seriously, to call Jesus a homosexual is to label him a sexual deviant. But what else would we expect from a man who previously said, "From my point of view, I would ban religion completely."

Discussing Christopher Hitchens's study of Mother Teresa, he termed the author "totally overrated as a scholar ... sloppy in his research", but nevertheless found much to admire, saying: "[I]n many respects he was a brilliant guy, he was quick, he was a provocateur, and that's the part of Christopher Hitchens that I loved. But when it came to the facts it didn't seem to matter to him." Donohue said he and Hitchens agreed on abortion, though Hitchens' views on abortion were not exactly those of Donohue. In 1993, Hitchens characterized his thinking as "I have my doubts about abortion. I find I'm very squeamish on the subject".

On December 6, 2013, Jon David Couzens filed a defamation lawsuit against Donohue. Couzens claimed he had sustained injuries following several statements made by Donohue. In October 2015, a federal district court dismissed charges of defamation, invasion of privacy, and intentional and negligent infliction of emotional distress against Donohue. In April 2015, the 8th Circuit of Appeals upheld this ruling.

Donohue criticized Fox News host Sean Hannity over comments he made on his April 16, 2026 show. Hannity claimed that he ""I left the Catholic church in large part due to the institutionalized corruption, and it was at the parish level, to the bishop level, cardinals, all the way to Rome." He also claimed that the scandal was "frankly not only unchecked, they never fully corrected it or dealt with it." In a statement, Donohue said Hannity's claims do not hold up to scrutiny, saying that between July 1, 2023 to June 30, 2024, only .004% of clergy members had a substantiated case of abuse made against them, compared to 4% of clergy between 1950 and 2001.

In April 2026, Donohue was critical of Fox News host Brian Kilmeade for false comments he made about Pope Pius XII's role in the Holocaust. Kilmeade claimed that "Pope Pius XII did nothing knowing, documents show that 6 million Jews were being slaughtered" and that the Vatican "signed a deal with the Nazis not to invade.” Donohue called Kilmeade "dead wrong" and provided evidence that Pope Pius XII helped save the lives of Jewish people.

== Writings ==
- The Politics of the American Civil Liberties Union (Transaction Publishers, 1985), ISBN 978-0-887-38021-1
- The New Freedom: Individualism and Collectivism in the Social Lives of Americans (Transaction Publishers, 1991)
- Twilight of Liberty: The Legacy of the ACLU, (1994)
- Secular Sabotage: How Liberals Are Destroying Religion and Culture in America (NY: FaithWords, 2009), ISBN 978-0-446-54721-5
- Why Catholicism Matters: How Catholic Virtues Can Reshape Society in the Twenty-First Century (2012)
- The Catholic Advantage: Why Health, Happiness, and Heaven Await the Faithful (2015)
- Unmasking Mother Teresa's Critics (2016)
- Common Sense Catholicism: How to Resolve Our Cultural Crisis (2019)
- The Truth About Clergy Sexual Abuse: Clarifying the Facts and Causes (2021)
- War on Virtue: How the Ruling Class Is Killing the American Dream (2023)
- Cultural Meltdown: The Secular Roots of Our Moral Crisis (2024)
- Christianity in the Crosshairs: Ruling Class and Radicals Find a Common Enemy (2026)
