= Maine International Film Festival =

- MIFF Logo
- Location: Waterville, Maine, United States
- Founded: 1998
- Most recent: 2025
- Awards: Audience Favorite Award; Tourmaline Prize (Feature); Tourmaline Prize (Short)
- Language: English
- Website: miff.org

The Maine International Film Festival, or MIFF, is a 10-day film festival held annually in Waterville, Maine. The festival runs in the third week of July at Maine Film Center and the Waterville Opera House. Founded in 1998, the festival showcases independent and international films, with a special focus on Maine and New England themed productions.

== Awards ==
=== Midlife Achievement Award ===
The MIFF Midlife Achievement Award is given annually to an actor or filmmaker whose contributions to independent cinema merit recognition. Past honorees include directors Jonathan Demme, Terrence Malick, and Walter Hill, and actors Gabriel Byrne, John Turturro, Ed Harris, Peter Fonda, Lili Taylor, Sissy Spacek, Dominique Sanda, and Michael Murphy. Additionally, Oscar-winning film editor Thelma Schoonmaker was honored in 2012.

=== Achievement Award Honorees ===
Highlights of the honorees' work are incorporated into the festival programming. In 2017, the festival honored Roger Deakins with the inaugural Karl Struss Legacy Award for Distinguished Achievement in Cinematography, named for and dedicated to the eponymous pioneering Maine-connected Hollywood cinematographer.

=== Audience favorite ===
The festival has historically given an audience favorite is determined each year by a balloting process. Past audience favorites include: George Washington (2000), The Wild Parrots of Telegraph Hill (2005), The Brand New Testament (2016) and The Children Act (2018).

=== Tourmaline Prize ===
More recently, the Tourmaline Prize (named after Maine’s state gem) is a jury selection for best Maine feature length and shorts award, $5,000 and $2,500 respectively, given annually.
