= Angela Singer =

New Zealand artist and animal rights activist (born 1966)

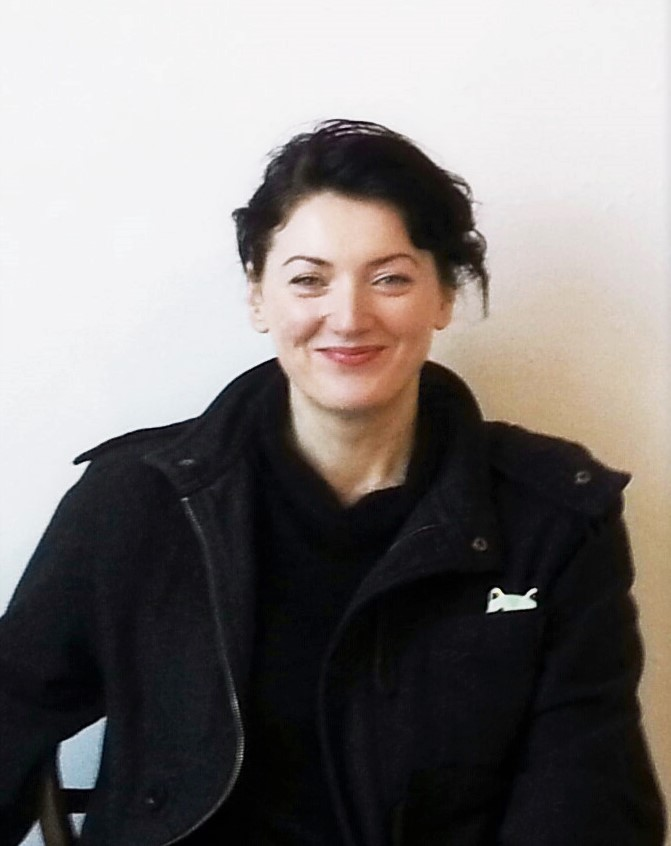
- Born: Essex, England
- Known for: Sculpture

Angela Singer (born 1966 in Essex) is an artist of British and New Zealand nationality who lives in Wellington, New Zealand. An animal rights activist, she addresses the way in which people exploit animals and the environment through the repurposing and remodelling of vintage taxidermy, a process she calls "de-taxidermy". Since the 1990s her work has been exhibited both in New Zealand and internationally.

She is not related to Peter Singer, the animal rights activist and philosopher.

== Education ==
Singer graduated in 2002 from the Elam School of Fine Arts, University of Auckland with an MFA.

== Art ==
Since the mid-1990s, Singer's art has explored the human and non-human animal relationship, driven by her concern with the ethical and epistemological consequences of humans using non-human life, and the role that humans play in the exploitation and destruction of animals and our environment. Singer sees the boundaries separating other species from humans as permeable.

Singer is known for working with vintage hunting trophy taxidermy, which she recycles into new sculptural forms to explore the human/animal divide. She calls this practice "de-taxidermy", a process which involves revealing the wounds inflicted on the animal, wounds that are obscured by the taxidermy process and its attempted "rescue from time". Singer recognizes the irony in brutally ripping apart the bodies of these animals in order to comment on our violence towards them. So, she incorporates into her work some of the history of the death of the animal, which she obtains from those who give her the vintage taxidermy. In this way, she honors the animal after its death.

A quote from Singer, regarding her use of taxidermy as an art form:

I think using taxidermy is a way for me to honour the animals' life, because all the taxidermy I use was once a trophy kill. ...The very idea of a trophy animal is sickening to me.

Like Karen Knorr, Singer uses old hunting trophies or vintage taxidermy that natural history museums have thrown away. Some of the trophy taxidermy Singer uses is found discarded in dumpsters and garbage piles. Curator Jo-Ann Conklin writes:

New Zealand artist and animal activist Angela Singer rails against trophy hunting. Her latest work, Spurts (2015), depicts a decapitated deer with cartoony yet still gruesome bubble-gum pink "blood" spurting from its neck.

Singer sculpts in various media including modelling clay, wax, fibre, ceramics, gemstones, and vintage jewelry, as well as wool and silk. Many of her sculptural works combine mixed media with vintage taxidermy. Aside from critiquing how humans hurt animals, Singer explores other aspects of the human-animal relationship. Singer's Ghost Cat ceramics speak to humans relationships with their dead pets. Her Ecotopia series, which combines taxidermy and ceramics, comments on the phenomenon of biologically mutated animals, and how we humans have domesticated a majority of the mammal population.

== Activism ==
Singer is an artist and an animal advocate. Like other artists such as Sue Coe, she is concerned with the ethics of using live animals in art. She will not work with living animals or have living creatures harmed or killed for her art. In the early 1990s she worked with the animal rights group Animal Liberation Victoria, Australia (ALV) antivivisection campaign.

== Feminism ==
Angela Singer's work sometimes touches upon feminism and makes female-animal comparisons. In Sore (2003), a male de-antlered deer is drenched in red pigmented wax, making it appear like a skinned female. The presentation of this deer as female is also supported by the use of blood, referencing menstruation, as well as the title Sore, which refers to a four year old female deer. Singer, by presenting this born-male deer as a suffering female, questions the difference between sexes, and objectifies the deer itself. Singer has spoken at length about how she most commonly acquires unwanted taxidermied animals from a specific group of people — white, male hunters — most of whom make it clear that they disagree with the concept of animal rights. With the idea in mind that these men see animals as 'other', Singer draws a connection in her work between the objectification of women and the objectification of animals, specifically with works like Sore (2003), Catch/Caught (2007), and Dripsy Dropsy (2007). She subverts the objectifying impact of traditional taxidermy by making the animal's violent death is the thing on display, rather than the animal itself.

== Personal life ==
Singer lives with her partner, artist Daniel Unverricht, in Wellington, New Zealand. The two have exhibited together at least once, for the Zzzooonotic exhibition in Wellington.

== Exhibitions ==
- Curious Creatures & Marvellous Monsters. Museum of New Zealand Te Papa Tongarewa, Wellington, New Zealand. 18 Aug – 4 Nov 2018
- The Sexual Politics of Meat. The Animal Museum, Los Angeles, USA. 25 Feb – 30 April 2017
- Dead Animals, or the Curious Occurrence of Taxidermy in Contemporary Art. David Winton Bell Gallery, List Art Center, Providence, Rhode Island, USA. 23 Jan – 27 Mar 2016
- Ecce animalia. Museum of Contemporary Sculpture, Poland. 8 March – 15 June 2014
- Points de vue d'artistes. Universcience Cité des sciences et de l'industrie, Paris, France. 23 September 2013 – 1 March 2014
- Unnatural Natural History. Royal West of England Academy (RWA), Bristol, UK. 14 July – 23 Sept 2012
- Controversy: The power of art. Mornington Peninsula Regional Gallery, Victoria, Australia. 21 June – 12 Aug 2012
- The Enchanted Forest. Strychnin Gallery, Berlin, Germany, May 13 – 5 June, and Musei Civici, Palazzo S. Francesco, Reggio Emilia, Italy, 17 June – 31 Aug 2011
- Reconstructing the Animal. Plimsoll Gallery, University of Tasmania, Centre for the Arts, Australia. 18 March – 15 April 2011
- The Enchanted Palace. Cabinet of Curiosities. Kensington Palace, London. Mar–Nov, 2010
- Creature Discomforts. The Suter Art Gallery Te Aratoi o Whakatū, Nelson, NZ. 13 May – 21 June 2009
- The Idea of the Animal. Melbourne International Arts Festival. RMIT Gallery, RMIT University, Melbourne, Australia. 12 Aug – 18 Nov 2006
- Animal Nature. Miller Gallery at Carnegie Mellon University, Pittsburgh, USA. 26 Aug – 2 Oct, 2005
- Animality. Blue Oyster Art Project Space, Dunedin, New Zealand. 24 June – 5 July 2003
- Zzzooonotic, {Suite} Wellington, Wellington, New Zealand. 3 – 27 June 2022

== See also ==
- Mark Dion
- Maurizio Cattelan
- Annette Messager
- Joan Fontcuberta
