= Roger Smith Hotel =

Hotel in Manhattan, New York

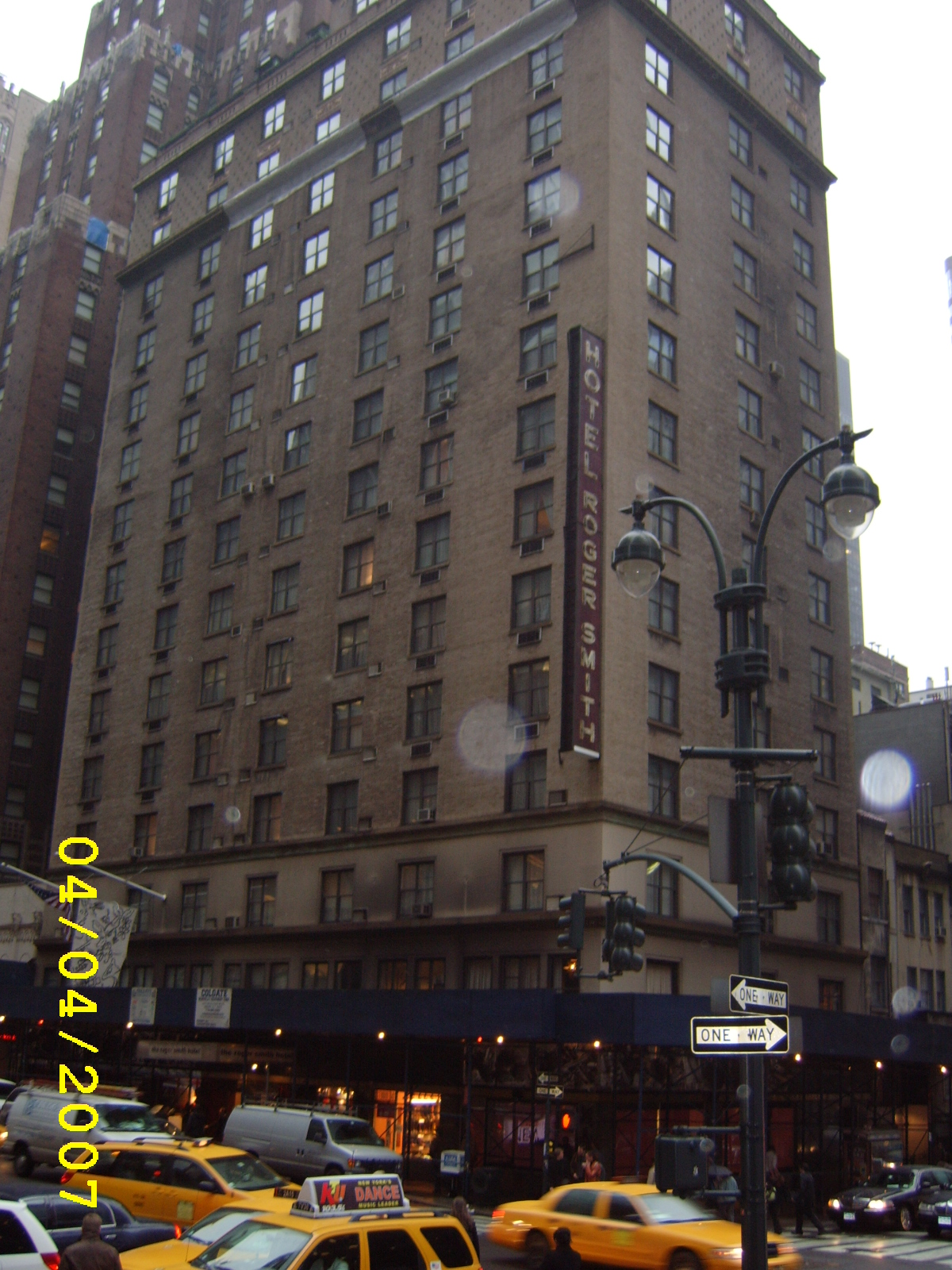
- The Roger Smith Hotel
- Interactive map of the Roger Smith Hotel area

General information
- Location: Manhattan, New York City, 501 Lexington Ave
- Coordinates: 40°45′17″N 73°58′24″W
- Opening: 1929
- Management: Roger Smith Corp.

Design and construction
- Architects: Hearn & Erich

Other information
- Number of rooms: 136

Website
- Official website

The Roger Smith Hotel was a family-run hotel established in 1929 and located at 501 Lexington Avenue in Midtown Manhattan, New York City.

== History ==
The hotel was built as part of a chain of Roger Smith Hotels. The Roger Smith Corporation opened the first Roger Smith hotel in Stamford, Connecticut on December 29, 1928 with Frederick Charlton as its first manager. They went on to add seven other hotels to the chain over the next ten years. The Elton Hotel in Waterbury, Connecticut, was a Roger Smith property when John F. Kennedy made an important campaign stop there November 6, 1960, just before his election. The Stamford branch was demolished in 1981. The Roger Smith Corporation bought the Behriont Hotel, located in White Plains, New York, and Hotel Brittany in 1931. The Brewster Hotel and the Hotel Cameron were acquired in 1934. Other hotels were added to the Roger Smith chain in Holyoke, Massachusetts in 1937, New Brunswick, New Jersey and Washington, D.C.

The current Roger Smith Hotel, located on 47th Street and Lexington Avenue in Manhattan, was taken over by the Roger Smith Corporation in 1938. Prior to that it was called the Hotel Winthrop, whose building had been constructed by Hearn & Erich in 1926. The hotels in the chain were either destroyed due to dilapidation or changed ownership, as was the case of the White Plains branch. James Knowles took over the management of the Manhattan hotel in 1988 and it is perhaps the only of the eight hotels still bearing the name Roger Smith. Knowles is a painter and sculptor. He graduated from Yale and the University of Pennsylvania with degrees in painting and sculpture. His father-in-law was Oscar de Lima, who had run the Roger Smith before him. Knowles took over the property after de Lima's death in 1987.

The hotel closed in 2021 and was sold to a timeshare company in 2022. The vacant building was resold in January 2024 to another timeshare company, Holiday Inn Club.

== Architecture ==
The current structure features 136 rooms. The building's facade is made of bricks. The decor is heavily influenced by art and features artistic pieces created by Knowles, who is both the hotel's president and artist-in-residence. Two pairs of bronze statues adorn the main entrance.
