= List of CSI: Miami episodes =

Episodes of American television series CSI: Miami

This is an episode list for the American police procedural television series CSI: Miami, which premiered on CBS on September 23, 2002.

The first three seasons of CSI: Miami consisted of 24 episodes each, while season four has 25 episodes. The fifth season once again consisted of 24 episodes, while the sixth season only has 21 episodes, due to the 2007–08 Writers Guild of America strike. The seventh season, like the fourth, has 25 episodes, while the eighth has 24 episodes. The ninth season consisted of 22 episodes, and the tenth and final season, which premiered on September 25, 2011, has 19 episodes.

During the course of the series, 232 episodes of CSI: Miami aired, concluding on April 8, 2012.

== Series overview ==
Season	Episodes	Originally released		Rank	Viewers (in millions)
Season	Episodes	First released	Last released	Rank	Viewers (in millions)
Backdoor pilot		May 9, 2002		—N/a	—N/a
1	24	September 23, 2002	May 19, 2003	12	16.45
2	24	September 22, 2003	May 24, 2004	9	18.06
3	24	September 20, 2004	May 23, 2005	7	19.00
4	25	September 19, 2005	May 22, 2006	9	18.12
5	24	September 18, 2006	May 14, 2007	12	16.98
6	21	September 24, 2007	May 19, 2008	16	13.91
7	25	September 22, 2008	May 18, 2009	13	14.26
8	24	September 21, 2009	May 24, 2010	24	12.65
9	22	October 3, 2010	May 8, 2011	27	11.75
10	19	September 25, 2011	April 8, 2012	36	10.84

== Episodes ==
=== Backdoor pilot (2002) ===
For the backdoor pilot, "No. overall" and "No. in season" refer to the episode's place in the order of episodes of the parent series CSI: Crime Scene Investigation.

No. overall	No. in season	Title	Directed by	Written by	Original release date	US viewers (millions)
45	22	"Cross Jurisdictions"	Danny Cannon	Anthony E. Zuiker & Ann Donahue & Carol Mendelsohn	May 9, 2002	27.12
The former police chief of Las Vegas is found murdered and his 7-year-old daughter is found alive in Miami. Catherine Willows and Warrick Brown then travel to Florida, where they assist the Miami CSIs led by Horatio Caine in hunting down the killer.

=== Season 1 (2002–03) ===
David Caruso, Emily Procter, Adam Rodriguez, Khandi Alexander, Rory Cochrane, and Kim Delaney star. Kim Delaney departs the cast following the tenth episode. Rex Linn and Sofia Milos both begin continuous recurring arcs this season.

No. overall	No. in season	Title	Directed by	Written by	Original release date	Prod. code	US viewers (millions)
1	1	"Golden Parachute"	Joe Chappelle	Steven Maeda	September 23, 2002	101	23.10
2	2	"Losing Face"	Joe Chappelle	Steven Maeda & Gwendolyn M. Parker	September 30, 2002	104	19.80
3	3	"Wet Foot/Dry Foot"	Tucker Gates	Eddie Guerra	October 7, 2002	102	17.18
4	4	"Just One Kiss"	Scott Brazil	Laurie McCarthy & Matt Witten	October 14, 2002	103	19.03
5	5	"Ashes to Ashes"	Bryan Spicer	Mark Israel	October 21, 2002	105	18.54
6	6	"Broken"	Deran Sarafian	Ildy Modrovich & Laurence Walsh	October 28, 2002	106	18.75
7	7	"Breathless"	Charlie Correll	Steven Maeda & Gwendolyn Parker	November 4, 2002	107	17.94
8	8	"Slaughterhouse"	Dick Pearce	Laurie McCarthy	November 11, 2002	108	20.06
9	9	"Kill Zone"	Daniel Attias	Mark Israel & Lois Johnson	November 18, 2002	109	17.16
10	10	"A Horrible Mind"	Greg Yaitanes	Ildy Modrovich & Laurence Walsh	November 25, 2002	110	18.84
11	11	"Camp Fear"	Deran Sarafian	Eddie Guerra & Steven Maeda	December 16, 2002	111	18.16
12	12	"Entrance Wound"	David Grossman	Laurie McCarthy & Gwendolyn M. Parker	January 6, 2003	112	17.52
13	13	"Bunk"	Charlie Correll	Elizabeth Devine	January 27, 2003	113	16.87
14	14	"Forced Entry"	Artie Mandelberg	Mark Israel & Lois Johnson	February 3, 2003	114	18.17
15	15	"Dead Woman Walking"	Jeannot Szwarc	Ildy Modrovich & Laurence Walsh	February 10, 2003	115	17.51
16	16	"Evidence of Things Unseen"	Joe Chappelle	David Black	February 17, 2003	116	18.32
17	17	"Simple Man"	Greg Yaitanes	Steven Maeda	February 24, 2003	117	19.11
18	18	"Dispo Day"	David Grossman	Story by : Ildy Modrovich & Laurence Walsh; Teleplay by : Elizabeth Devine	March 10, 2003	118	18.95
19	19	"Double Cap"	Joe Chappelle	Marc Dube	March 31, 2003	119	16.97
20	20	"Grave Young Men"	Peter Markle	Lois Johnson	April 14, 2003	120	14.90
21	21	"Spring Break"	Deran Sarafian	Steven Maeda	April 28, 2003	121	17.18
22	22	"Tinder Box"	Charlie Correll	Corey Miller	May 5, 2003	122	14.46
23	23	"Freaks and Tweaks"	Deran Sarafian	Story by : John Haynes; Teleplay by : Elizabeth Devine	May 12, 2003	123	17.23
24	24	"Body Count"	Joe Chappelle	Story by : Steven Maeda; Teleplay by : Idly Modrovich & Laurence Walsh	May 19, 2003	124	19.30

=== Season 2 (2003–04) ===
David Caruso, Emily Procter, Adam Rodriguez, Khandi Alexander, and Rory Cochrane star. Rex Linn and Sofia Milos both continue their recurring arcs. "MIA/NYC NonStop" serves as the pilot episode of CSI: NY, and stars Gary Sinise and Melina Kanakaredes.

No. overall	No. in season	Title	Directed by	Written by	Original release date	Prod. code	US viewers (millions)
25	1	"Blood Brothers"	Danny Cannon	Ann Donahue	September 22, 2003	201	17.40
26	2	"Dead Zone"	Joe Chappelle	Michael Ostrowski	September 29, 2003	202	17.33
27	3	"Hard Time"	David Grossman	Steven Maeda	October 6, 2003	204	18.13
28	4	"Death Grip"	Deran Sarafian	Elizabeth Devine	October 13, 2003	203	17.64
29	5	"The Best Defense"	Scott Lautanen	Shane Brennan	October 20, 2003	205	17.55
30	6	"Hurricane Anthony"	Joe Chappelle	Ildy Modrovich & Laurence Walsh	November 3, 2003	206	19.52
31	7	"Grand Prix"	David Grossman	Michael Ostrowski & Steven Maeda	November 10, 2003	207	18.44
32	8	"Big Brother"	Joe Chappelle	Ann Donahue & Jonathan Glassner	November 17, 2003	208	18.87
33	9	"Bait"	Deran Sarafian	Steven Maeda & Shane Brennan	November 24, 2003	209	19.73
34	10	"Extreme"	Karen Gaviola	Elizabeth Devine & John Haynes	December 15, 2003	210	19.21
35	11	"Complications"	Scott Lautanen	Sunil Nayar & Corey Miller	January 5, 2004	211	20.40
36	12	"Witness to Murder"	Duane Clark	Story by : Michael Ostrowski; Teleplay by : Ildy Modrovich & Laurence Walsh	January 12, 2004	212	19.73
37	13	"Blood Moon"	Scott Lautanen	Jonathan Glassner & Marc Dube	February 2, 2004	213	20.60
38	14	"Slow Burn"	Joe Chappelle	Shane Brennan & Michael Ostrowski	February 9, 2004	216	21.76
39	15	"Stalkerazzi"	Deran Sarafian	Elizabeth Devine & Steven Maeda	February 16, 2004	214	19.63
40	16	"Invasion"	Félix Enríquez Alcalá	Brian Davidson & Jonathan Glassner	February 23, 2004	215	20.34
41	17	"Money for Nothing"	Karen Gaviola	Marc Dube	March 1, 2004	217	19.90
42	18	"Wannabe"	Fred Keller	Story by : John Haynes; Teleplay by : Elizabeth Devine & Steven Maeda	March 22, 2004	218	20.33
43	19	"Deadline"	Deran Sarafian	Story by : Sunil Nayar; Teleplay by : Ildy Modrovich & Laurence Walsh	March 29, 2004	219	19.68
44	20	"The Oath"	Duane Clark	Alison Lea Bingeman	April 19, 2004	220	21.02
45	21	"Not Landing"	Joe Chappelle	Story by : Jonathan Glassner; Teleplay by : Shane Brennan & Marc Dube	May 3, 2004	221	17.62
46	22	"Rap Sheet"	David Grossman	Ildy Modrovich & Corey Miller	May 10, 2004	222	20.94
47	23	"MIA/NYC NonStop"	Danny Cannon	Anthony E. Zuiker & Ann Donahue & Carol Mendelsohn	May 17, 2004	223	23.08
48	24	"Innocent"	Joe Chappelle	Story by : John Haynes; Teleplay by : Steven Maeda & Sunil Nayar	May 24, 2004	224	21.30

=== Season 3 (2004–05) ===
David Caruso, Emily Procter, Adam Rodriguez, Khandi Alexander, and Rory Cochrane star. Cochrane departs the main cast after the first episode. Jonathan Togo and Sofia Milos join the main cast, while Milos departs again at the end of the season. Rex Linn continues to recur.

No. overall	No. in season	Title	Directed by	Written by	Original release date	Prod. code	US viewers (millions)
49	1	"Lost Son"	Duane Clark	Ann Donahue & Elizabeth Devine	September 20, 2004	301	22.46
50	2	"Pro Per"	Karen Gaviola	John Haynes & Steven Maeda	September 27, 2004	302	19.72
51	3	"Under the Influence"	Scott Lautanen	Marc Dube & Corey Miller	October 4, 2004	303	20.75
52	4	"Murder in a Flash"	Fred Keller	Anne McGrail & Sunil Nayar	October 11, 2004	304	21.94
53	5	"Legal"	Duane Clark	Michael Ostrowski & Ildy Modrovich	October 18, 2004	305	19.81
54	6	"Hell Night"	Scott Lautanen	Steven Maeda & Corey Miller	October 25, 2004	306	21.91
55	7	"Crime Wave"	Karen Gaviola	Elizabeth Devine	November 8, 2004	307	22.09
56	8	"Speed Kills"	Fred Keller	Sunil Nayar & Marc Dube	November 15, 2004	308	22.48
57	9	"Pirated"	Duane Clark	Michael Ostrowski & Steven Maeda	November 22, 2004	309	22.12
58	10	"After the Fall"	Scott Lautanen	Ildy Modrovich & Marc Dube	November 29, 2004	310	22.71
59	11	"Addiction"	Steven DePaul	Charles Holland	December 13, 2004	311	20.54
60	12	"Shootout"	Norberto Barba	Corey Miller & Sunil Nayar	January 3, 2005	312	18.49
61	13	"Cop Killer"	Jonathan Glassner	Steven Maeda & Krystal Houghton	January 17, 2005	313	22.04
62	14	"One Night Stand"	Greg Yaitanes	Michael Ostrowski & John Haynes	February 7, 2005	314	18.82
63	15	"Identity"	Gloria Muzio	Ann Donahue & Ildy Modrovich	February 14, 2005	315	19.35
64	16	"Nothing to Lose"	Karen Gaviola	Elizabeth Devine & Marc Dube	February 21, 2005	316	19.48
65	17	"Money Plane"	Scott Lautanen	Sunil Nayar & Steven Maeda	March 7, 2005	317	21.68
66	18	"Game Over"	Jonathan Glassner	Michael Ostrowski & Corey Miller	March 21, 2005	318	18.93
67	19	"Sex & Taxes"	Scott Shiffman	Ildy Modrovich & Brian Davidson	April 11, 2005	319	20.67
68	20	"Killer Date"	Karen Gaviola	Elizabeth Devine & John Haynes	April 18, 2005	320	20.11
69	21	"Recoil"	Joe Chappelle	Steven Maeda & Marc Dube	May 2, 2005	321	20.70
70	22	"Vengeance"	Norberto Barba	Corey Miller & Sunil Nayar	May 9, 2005	322	20.02
71	23	"Whacked"	Scott Lautanen	Ann Donahue & Elizabeth Devine	May 16, 2005	323	22.98
72	24	"10-7"	Joe Chappelle	Story by : Michael Ostrowski; Teleplay by : Ann Donahue & Elizabeth Devine	May 23, 2005	324	21.22

=== Season 4 (2005–06) ===
David Caruso, Emily Procter, Adam Rodriguez, Khandi Alexander, and Jonathan Togo star. Rex Linn continues to recur, Eva LaRue begins a continuous arc.

No. overall	No. in season	Title	Directed by	Written by	Original release date	Prod. code	US viewers (millions)
73	1	"From the Grave"	Karen Gaviola	Ann Donahue & Elizabeth Devine	September 19, 2005	401	19.21
74	2	"Blood in the Water"	Duane Clark	Dean Widenmann & Sunil Nayar	September 26, 2005	402	17.38
75	3	"Prey"	Scott Lautanen	Corey Miller & Barry O'Brien	October 3, 2005	403	18.67
76	4	"48 Hours to Life"	Norberto Barba	John Haynes & Marc Dube	October 10, 2005	404	18.49
77	5	"Three-Way"	Jonathan Glassner	Marc Guggenheim & Ildy Modrovich	October 17, 2005	405	17.91
78	6	"Under Suspicion"	Sam Hill	Sunil Nayar & Barry O'Brien	October 24, 2005	406	19.94
79	7	"Felony Flight"	Scott Lautanen	Elizabeth Devine & Anthony E. Zuiker & Ann Donahue	November 7, 2005	407	18.39
80	8	"Nailed"	Karen Gaviola	Corey Miller & Barry O'Brien	November 14, 2005	408	19.36
81	9	"Urban Hellraisers"	Matt Earl Beesley	Dean Widenmann & Marc Guggenheim	November 21, 2005	409	19.36
82	10	"Shattered"	Scott Lautanen	Ildy Modrovich	November 28, 2005	410	19.77
83	11	"Payback"	Sam Hill	Story by : Marc Dube & Ildy Modrovich & Marc Guggenheim; Teleplay by : Marc Dube	December 19, 2005	411	20.33
84	12	"The Score"	Jonathan Glassner	Barry O'Brien	January 9, 2006	412	20.15
85	13	"Silencer"	Ernest R. Dickerson	Sunil Nayar	January 23, 2006	413	19.69
86	14	"Fade Out"	Scott Lautanen	Corey Miller	January 30, 2006	414	20.43
87	15	"Skeletons"	Karen Gaviola	John Haynes & Elizabeth Devine	February 6, 2006	415	18.68
88	16	"Deviant"	Scott Lautanen	Krystal Houghton	February 27, 2006	416	18.44
89	17	"Collision"	Sam Hill	Dean Widenmann	March 6, 2006	417	18.61
90	18	"Double Jeopardy"	Scott Lautanen	Brian Davidson	March 13, 2006	418	19.01
91	19	"Driven"	Eagle Egilsson	Ildy Modrovich	March 20, 2006	419	19.86
92	20	"Free Fall"	Scott Lautanen	Marc Dube	April 10, 2006	420	17.16
93	21	"Dead Air"	Sam Hill	John Haynes	April 24, 2006	421	18.74
94	22	"Open Water"	Scott Lautanen	Marc Dube & Ildy Modrovich	May 1, 2006	422	19.31
95	23	"Shock"	Karen Gaviola	Brian Davidson & Corey Miller	May 8, 2006	423	19.96
96	24	"Rampage"	Duane Clark	Ann Donahue & Sunil Nayar	May 15, 2006	424	17.50
97	25	"One of Our Own"	Matt Earl Beesley	Story by : Elizabeth Devine; Teleplay by : Barry O'Brien & Krystal Houghton	May 22, 2006	425	19.96

=== Season 5 (2006–07) ===
David Caruso, Emily Procter, Adam Rodriguez, Khandi Alexander, and Jonathan Togo star. Rex Linn and Eva LaRue join the main cast. Sofia Milos guest stars.

No. overall	No. in season	Title	Directed by	Written by	Original release date	US viewers (millions)
98	1	"Rio"	Joe Chappelle	Sunil Nayar	September 18, 2006	17.62
99	2	"Going Under"	Matt Earl Beesley	Marc Dube & John Haynes	September 25, 2006	17.79
100	3	"Death Pool 100"	Sam Hill	Ann Donahue & Elizabeth Devine	October 2, 2006	17.90
101	4	"If Looks Could Kill"	Scott Lautanen	Ildy Modrovich & Barry O'Brien	October 9, 2006	17.61
102	5	"Death Eminent"	Eagle Egilsson	Corey Miller & Brian Davidson	October 16, 2006	18.12
103	6	"Curse of the Coffin"	Joe Chappelle	Sunil Nayar & Krystal Houghton	October 23, 2006	17.83
104	7	"High Octane"	Sam Hill	Marc Dube	November 6, 2006	16.80
105	8	"Darkroom"	Karen Gaviola	John Haynes	November 13, 2006	18.77
106	9	"Going, Going, Gone"	Matt Earl Beesley	Elizabeth Devine	November 20, 2006	18.54
107	10	"Come as You Are"	Joe Chappelle	Brian Davidson	November 27, 2006	17.13
108	11	"Backstabbers"	Gina Lamar	Barry O'Brien	December 11, 2006	16.00
109	12	"Internal Affairs"	Scott Lautanen	Corey Miller	January 8, 2007	16.01
110	13	"Throwing Heat"	Joe Chappelle	Krystal Houghton	January 22, 2007	18.86
111	14	"No Man's Land"	Scott Lautanen	Dominic Abeyta	February 5, 2007	18.43
112	15	"Man Down"	Karen Gaviola	Ildy Modrovich	February 12, 2007	19.90
113	16	"Broken Home"	Sam Hill	Barry O'Brien & Krystal Houghton	February 19, 2007	19.23
114	17	"A Grizzly Murder"	Eagle Egilsson	Elizabeth Devine & Brian Davidson	February 26, 2007	17.42
115	18	"Triple Threat"	Scott Lautanen	Corey Miller & Sunil Nayar	March 19, 2007	17.66
116	19	"Bloodline"	Carey Meyer	John Haynes & Marc Dube	April 9, 2007	16.11
117	20	"Rush"	Sam Hill	Ildy Modrovich & Krystal Houghton	April 16, 2007	15.36
118	21	"Just Murdered"	Eagle Egilsson	Ty Scott	April 23, 2007	17.03
119	22	"Burned"	Anthony Hemingway	Corey Evett & Matt Partney	April 30, 2007	17.24
120	23	"Kill Switch"	Scott Lautanen	Corey Miller & Marc Dube	May 7, 2007	17.18
121	24	"Born to Kill"	Karen Gaviola	Sunil Nayar & Ann Donahue	May 14, 2007	16.63

=== Season 6 (2007–08) ===
David Caruso, Emily Procter, Adam Rodriguez, Khandi Alexander, Jonathan Togo, Rex Linn, and Eva LaRue star. Khandi Alexander departs the main cast at the end of the season. Rory Cochrane and Sofia Milos guest star.

No. overall	No. in season	Title	Directed by	Written by	Original release date	Prod. code	US viewers (millions)
122	1	"Dangerous Son"	Sam Hill	Marc Dube & Krystal Houghton	September 24, 2007	601	15.08
123	2	"Cyber-lebrity"	Matt Earl Beesley	Corey Evett & Matt Partney	October 1, 2007	602	14.72
124	3	"Inside Out"	Gina Lamar	Sunil Nayar & John Haynes	October 8, 2007	603	14.45
125	4	"Bang, Bang, Your Debt"	Karen Gaviola	Brian Davidson & Barry O'Brien	October 15, 2007	604	15.59
126	5	"Deep Freeze"	Sam Hill	Elizabeth Devine	October 22, 2007	605	15.67
127	6	"Sunblock"	Christine Moore	Corey Miller	October 29, 2007	606	14.85
128	7	"Chain Reaction"	Scott Lautanen	Brian Davidson & Matt Partney & Corey Evett	November 5, 2007	607	14.07
129	8	"Permanent Vacation"	Eagle Egilsson	Barry O'Brien & Krystal Houghton	November 12, 2007	608	15.46
130	9	"Stand Your Ground"	Joe Chappelle	Marc Dube & John Haynes	November 19, 2007	609	15.83
131	10	"CSI: My Nanny"	Jonathan Glassner	Corey Miller & Krystal Houghton	November 26, 2007	610	15.58
132	11	"Guerillas in the Mist"	Carey Meyer	Barry O'Brien & Brian Davidson	December 10, 2007	611	14.11
133	12	"Miami Confidential"	Sam Hill	Marc Dube	December 17, 2007	612	14.01
134	13	"Raising Caine"	Gina Lamar	Sunil Nayar	January 14, 2008	613	14.80
135	14	"You May Now Kill the Bride"	Eagle Egilsson	Barry O'Brien	March 24, 2008	614	16.07
136	15	"Ambush"	Sam Hill	Corey Evett & Matt Partney	March 31, 2008	615	15.65
137	16	"All In"	Joe Chappelle	Krystal Houghton	April 1, 2008	616	14.23
138	17	"To Kill a Predator"	Matt Earl Beesley	Brian Davidson	April 21, 2008	617	14.38
139	18	"Tunnel Vision"	Karen Gaviola	Tamara Jaron	April 28, 2008	618	13.88
140	19	"Rock and a Hard Place"	Gina Lamar	Marc Dube	May 5, 2008	619	14.11
141	20	"Down to the Wire"	Eagle Egilsson	Sunil Nayar	May 12, 2008	620	13.92
142	21	"Going Ballistic"	Sam Hill	Corey Miller	May 19, 2008	621	16.27

=== Season 7 (2008–09) ===
David Caruso, Emily Procter, Adam Rodriguez, Jonathan Togo, Rex Linn, and Eva LaRue star. Megalyn Echikunwoke joins the main cast, and departs again at the end of the season. Khandi Alexander and Sofia Milos guest star.

No. overall	No. in season	Title	Directed by	Written by	Original release date	US viewers (millions)
143	1	"Resurrection"	Joe Chappelle	Barry O'Brien	September 22, 2008	17.23
144	2	"Won't Get Fueled Again"	Matt Earl Beesley	Corey Evett & Matt Partney	September 29, 2008	14.35
145	3	"And How Does That Make You Kill?"	Sam Hill	Tamara Jaron	October 6, 2008	13.88
146	4	"Raging Cannibal"	Gina Lamar	Brian Davidson	October 13, 2008	13.22
147	5	"Bombshell"	Eric Mirich	Marc Dube	October 20, 2008	13.51
148	6	"Wrecking Crew"	Joe Chappelle	Corey Miller	November 3, 2008	12.74
149	7	"Cheating Death"	Sam Hill	Krystal Houghton	November 10, 2008	13.82
150	8	"Gone Baby Gone"	Carey Meyer	Dominic Abeyta	November 17, 2008	15.46
151	9	"Power Trip"	Joe Chappelle	Corey Evett & Matt Partney	November 24, 2008	14.33
152	10	"The DeLuca Motel"	Gina Lamar	Sunil Nayar	December 8, 2008	13.79
153	11	"Tipping Point"	Marco Black	Brian Davidson	December 15, 2008	14.56
154	12	"Head Case"	Sam Hill	Tamara Jaron	January 12, 2009	15.83
155	13	"And They're Offed"	Matt Earl Beesley	Barry O'Brien	January 19, 2009	14.58
156	14	"Smoke Gets in Your CSI's"	Joe Chappelle	Krystal Houghton	February 2, 2009	16.10
157	15	"Presumed Guilty"	Larry Detwiler	Corey Miller	February 9, 2009	13.81
158	16	"Sink or Swim"	Sam Hill	Marc Dube	March 2, 2009	13.42
159	17	"Divorce Party"	Karen Gaviola	Corey Evett & Matt Partney	March 9, 2009	14.22
160	18	"Flight Risk"	Joe Chappelle	Sunil Nayar	March 16, 2009	13.61
161	19	"Target Specific"	Sam Hill	Tamara Jaron	March 23, 2009	13.67
162	20	"Wolfe In Sheep's Clothing"	Carey Meyer	Krystal Houghton	March 30, 2009	13.46
163	21	"Chip/Tuck"	Allison Liddi-Brown	Brian Davidson	April 13, 2009	13.39
164	22	"Dead on Arrival"	Gina Lamar	Corey Miller	April 27, 2009	12.12
165	23	"Collateral Damage"	Sam Hill	Marc Dube	May 4, 2009	13.72
166	24	"Dissolved"	Matt Earl Beesley	Corey Evett & Matt Partney	May 11, 2009	13.59
167	25	"Seeing Red"	Joe Chappelle	Barry O'Brien	May 18, 2009	14.20

=== Season 8 (2009–10) ===
David Caruso, Emily Procter, Adam Rodriguez, Jonathan Togo, Rex Linn, and Eva LaRue star. Eddie Cibrian and Omar Miller join the main cast, with Cibrian departing at the end of the season. Rodriguez leaves the main cast in episode five, recurring thereafter. Khandi Alexander guest stars.

No. overall	No. in season	Title	Directed by	Written by	Original release date	US viewers (millions)
168	1	"Out of Time"	Sam Hill	Tamara Jaron	September 21, 2009	14.20
169	2	"Hostile Takeover"	Allison Liddi-Brown	Corey Evett & Matt Partney	September 28, 2009	13.96
170	3	"Bolt Action"	Gina Lamar	Melissa Scrivner	October 5, 2009	13.43
171	4	"In Plane Sight"	Larry Detwiler	Robert Hornak	October 12, 2009	13.27
172	5	"Bad Seed"	Matt Earl Beesley	Brian Davidson	October 19, 2009	13.16
173	6	"Dude, Where's My Groom?"	Carey Meyer	Brett Mahoney	November 2, 2009	12.52
174	7	"Bone Voyage"	Sam Hill	Barry O'Brien	November 9, 2009	14.38
175	8	"Point of Impact"	Eric Mirich	Krystal Houghton	November 16, 2009	13.26
176	9	"Kill Clause"	Scott Lautanen	Jeremy R. Littman	November 23, 2009	13.22
177	10	"Count Me Out"	Marco Black	Marc Dube	December 7, 2009	12.72
178	11	"Delko for the Defense"	Gina Lamar	Tamara Jaron	December 14, 2009	14.18
179	12	"Show Stopper"	Sam Hill	Corey Evett & Matt Partney	January 11, 2010	13.65
180	13	"Die by the Sword"	Matt Earl Beesley	Melissa Scrivner	January 18, 2010	13.22
181	14	"In the Wind"	Allison Liddi-Brown	Brett Mahoney	February 1, 2010	13.44
182	15	"Miami, We Have a Problem"	Sam Hill	Brian Davidson	February 8, 2010	13.53
183	16	"L.A."	Rob Zombie	Barry O'Brien	March 1, 2010	12.07
184	17	"Getting Axed"	Carey Meyer	Krystal Houghton	March 8, 2010	11.93
185	18	"Dishonor"	Sam Hill	Marc Dube	March 22, 2010	10.80
186	19	"Spring Breakdown"	Larry Detwiler	Corey Evett & Matt Partney	April 12, 2010	10.78
187	20	"Backfire"	Don Tardino	Tamara Jaron & Melissa Scrivner	April 19, 2010	11.66
188	21	"Meltdown"	Matt Earl Beesley	K. David Bena & Brian Davidson	May 3, 2010	9.62
189	22	"Mommie Deadest"	Gina Lamar	Krystal Houghton & Brett Mahoney	May 10, 2010	11.01
190	23	"Time Bomb"	Sam Hill	Corey Evett & Matt Partney	May 17, 2010	10.52
191	24	"All Fall Down"	Joe Chappelle	Barry O'Brien & Marc Dube	May 24, 2010	12.38

=== Season 9 (2010–11) ===
David Caruso, Emily Procter, Jonathan Togo, Rex Linn, Eva LaRue, and Omar Miller star. Eddie Cibrian guest stars, while Adam Rodriguez rejoins the main cast.

No. overall	No. in season	Title	Directed by	Written by	Original release date	US viewers (millions)
192	1	"Fallen"	Sam Hill	Tamara Jaron	October 3, 2010	11.75
193	2	"Sudden Death"	Matt Earl Beesley	Corey Evett & Matt Partney	October 10, 2010	9.48
194	3	"See No Evil"	Gina Lamar	Krystal Houghton	October 17, 2010	10.89
195	4	"Manhunt"	Don Tardino	Marc Dube	October 24, 2010	10.00
196	5	"Sleepless in Miami"	Sam Hill	Brian Davidson	October 31, 2010	9.67
197	6	"Reality Kills"	Marco Black	Melissa Scrivner	November 14, 2010	10.26
198	7	"On the Hook"	Tim Story	Scott Landy	November 21, 2010	10.57
199	8	"Happy Birthday"	Sam Hill	Barry O'Brien & Marc Dube	December 5, 2010	10.66
200	9	"Blood Sugar"	Rod Holcomb	Gregory Bassenian	December 12, 2010	9.89
201	10	"Match Made in Hell"	Eric Mirich	Brett Mahoney	January 2, 2011	10.92
202	11	"F-T-F"	David Arquette	Melissa Scrivner & K. David Bena	January 9, 2011	12.00
203	12	"Wheels Up"	Sam Hill	Corey Evett & Matt Partney	January 16, 2011	10.91
204	13	"Last Stand"	Matt Earl Beesley	Brian Davidson	February 20, 2011	10.47
205	14	"Stoned Cold"	Allison Liddi	Tamara Jaron	February 27, 2011	8.24
206	15	"Blood Lust"	Gina Lamar	Krystal Houghton Ziv	March 6, 2011	10.65
207	16	"Hunting Ground"	Adam Rodriguez	Adam Rodriguez	March 13, 2011	11.85
208	17	"Special Delivery"	Allison Liddi	Michael McGrale	March 20, 2011	10.93
209	18	"About Face"	Sam Hill	Corey Evett & Matt Partney	March 27, 2011	11.19
210	19	"Caged"	Larry Detwiler	Tamara Jaron & K. David Bena	April 10, 2011	9.98
211	20	"Paint It Black"	Gina Lamar	Krystal Houghton Ziv & Melissa Scrivner	April 17, 2011	9.97
212	21	"G.O."	Matt Earl Beesley	Brett Mahoney	May 1, 2011	7.65
213	22	"Mayday"	Sam Hill	Marc Dube & Barry O'Brien	May 8, 2011	9.85

=== Season 10 (2011–12) ===
David Caruso, Emily Procter, Jonathan Togo, Rex Linn, Eva LaRue, Omar Miller, and Adam Rodriguez star.

No. overall	No. in season	Title	Directed by	Written by	Original release date	US viewers (millions)
214	1	"Countermeasures"	Sam Hill	Marc Dube & Barry O'Brien	September 25, 2011	9.89
215	2	"Stiff"	Gina Lamar	Doreen J. Blauschild	October 2, 2011	10.34
216	3	"Blown Away"	Don Tardino	Brian Davidson	October 9, 2011	10.23
217	4	"Look Who’s Taunting"	Marco Black	Krystal Houghton	October 16, 2011	10.64
218	5	"Killer Regrets"	Sam Hill	Brett Mahoney	October 23, 2011	9.77
219	6	"By the Book"	Gina Lamar	Melissa Scrivner	October 30, 2011	9.97
220	7	"Sinner Takes All"	Larry Detwiler	Michael McGrale & Greg Bassenian	November 6, 2011	8.67
221	8	"Dead Ringer"	Sam Hill	Tamara Jaron	November 13, 2011	9.77
222	9	"A Few Dead Men"	Don Tardino	K. David Bena	November 20, 2011	9.55
223	10	"Long Gone"	James Wilcox	Marc Dube & Barry O'Brien	December 4, 2011	10.43
224	11	"Crowned"	Gina Lamar	Brett Mahoney & Krystal Houghton Ziv	December 11, 2011	10.16
225	12	"Friendly Fire"	Sam Hill	Tamara Jaron & Greg Bassenian	January 8, 2012	10.46
226	13	"Terminal Velocity"	Sylvain White	Robert Hornak & Brian Davidson	January 29, 2012	10.57
227	14	"Last Straw"	Bill Gierhart	Melissa Scrivner & Michael McGrale	February 19, 2012	10.03
228	15	"No Good Deed"	Matt Earl Beesley	Grace DeVuono	March 4, 2012	10.14
229	16	"Rest in Pieces"	Sam Hill	Marc Dube & Barry O'Brien	March 11, 2012	10.72
230	17	"At Risk"	Adam Rodriguez	Adam Rodriguez	March 18, 2012	8.54
231	18	"Law and Disorder"	Allison Liddi Brown	Michael McGrale & Greg Bassenian	March 25, 2012	9.29
232	19	"Habeas Corpse"	Sam Hill	Barry O'Brien & Marc Dube	April 8, 2012	7.94

== Ratings ==
CSI: Miami : U.S. viewers per episode (millions)

Season	Episode number																								
Season	1	2	3	4	5	6	7	8	9	10	11	12	13	14	15	16	17	18	19	20	21	22	23	24	25
1	23.10	19.80	17.18	19.03	18.54	18.75	17.94	20.06	17.16	18.84	18.16	17.52	16.87	18.17	17.51	18.32	19.11	18.95	16.97	14.90	17.18	14.46	17.23	19.30	–
2	17.40	17.33	18.13	17.64	17.55	19.52	18.44	16.57	19.73	19.21	20.40	19.73	20.60	21.76	19.63	20.34	19.90	20.33	19.69	21.02	17.62	20.94	23.08	21.30	–
3	22.46	19.72	20.75	21.94	19.81	21.91	22.09	22.48	22.12	22.71	20.54	18.49	22.04	18.82	19.35	19.46	21.68	18.93	20.67	20.11	20.70	20.02	22.98	21.22	–
4	19.21	17.38	18.67	18.49	17.91	19.94	18.39	19.36	19.36	19.77	20.33	20.15	19.69	20.43	18.68	18.43	18.61	19.01	19.86	17.16	18.74	19.31	19.96	17.50	19.96
5	17.62	17.79	17.90	17.61	18.12	17.83	16.80	18.77	18.54	17.13	16.00	16.01	18.86	18.43	19.90	19.23	17.42	17.66	16.11	15.36	17.03	17.24	17.18	16.63	–
6	15.08	14.72	14.45	15.59	15.67	14.85	14.07	15.46	15.83	15.58	14.11	14.01	14.80	16.07	15.65	14.23	14.38	13.88	14.11	13.92	16.27	–			
7	17.23	14.35	13.88	13.22	13.51	12.74	13.82	15.46	14.33	13.79	14.56	15.83	15.58	16.10	13.81	13.42	14.22	13.61	16.67	13.46	13.39	12.12	13.72	13.59	14.20
8	14.20	13.96	13.43	13.27	13.16	12.52	14.38	13.26	13.22	12.72	14.18	13.65	13.22	13.44	13.53	12.07	11.93	10.80	10.78	11.66	9.62	11.01	10.52	12.38	–
9	11.75	9.48	10.89	10.00	9.67	10.26	10.57	10.66	9.89	10.92	12.00	10.91	10.47	8.24	10.65	11.85	10.93	11.19	9.98	9.97	7.65	9.85	–		
10	9.89	10.34	10.23	10.64	9.77	9.97	8.67	9.77	9.55	10.43	10.16	10.46	10.57	10.03	10.14	10.72	8.54	9.29	7.94	–					

Audience measurement performed by Nielsen Media Research

== Home video releases ==
Region 4 (Australia) releases all contain 6 discs with the exception of season five which contains 5 discs.

Season	Episodes	DVD release dates			
Season	Episodes	Region 1	Region 2	Region 4	Discs
Pilot	1	September 2, 2003	March 15, 2004	November 8, 2006	6
1	24	June 29, 2004	February 21, 2005	November 8, 2006	7
2	24	January 4, 2005	February 20, 2006	February 7, 2007	7
3	24	November 22, 2005	October 23, 2006	October 16, 2007	7
4	25	October 31, 2006	October 15, 2007	July 9, 2008	7
5	24	October 30, 2007	September 21, 2008	March 4, 2009	6
6	21	September 9, 2008	July 27, 2009	March 10, 2010	6
7	25	September 15, 2009	June 7, 2010	March 16, 2011	7
8	24	October 12, 2010	July 25, 2011	April 18, 2012	7
9	22	September 27, 2011	June 25, 2012	September 12, 2012	6
10	19	September 25, 2012	April 1, 2013	October 16, 2013	5
Total	232	November 14, 2017	August 4, 2014	TBA	52

== See also ==
- CSI (franchise)
- List of CSI: Crime Scene Investigation episodes
- List of CSI: NY episodes
- List of CSI: Cyber episodes
