= Tom Hillmann =

American actor

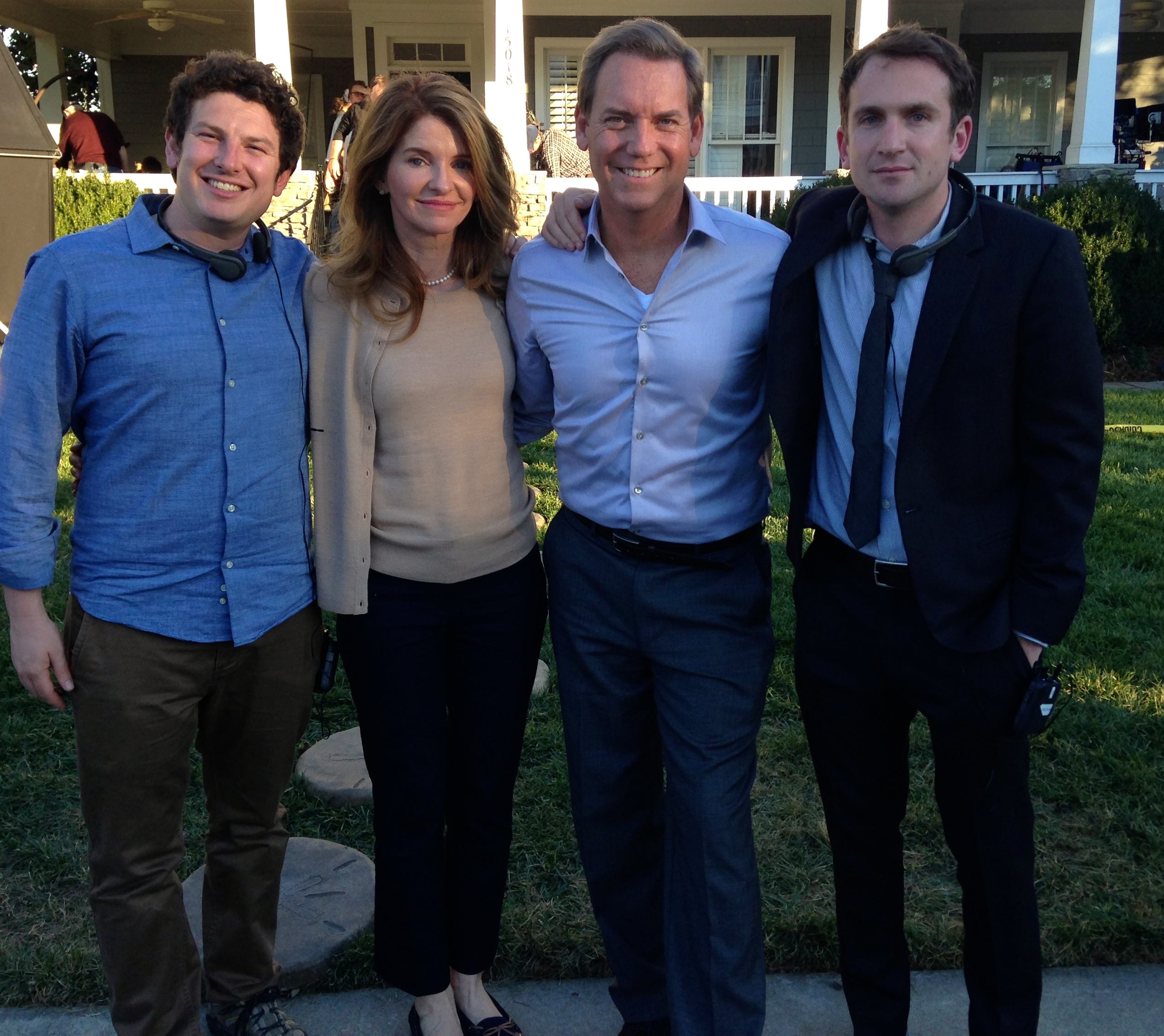
- Hillmann (second from right) on the set of Paper Towns
- Citizenship: United States of America
- Occupations: Film and television actor
- Known for: Greaser in Concession Stand in The Outsiders

Tom Hillmann is an American film and television actor best known for his role in The Outsiders. He has guest starred on The CW show Star-Crossed as Grayson's father. He has worked opposite David Caruso recurring as Special Agent Sackheim on the CBS crime series CSI: Miami as well as Denzel Washington in Out of Time.

In the 2015 theatrical release Paper Towns, he plays the father of the character played by Cara Delevingne.

== Filmography ==
=== Film ===
Year	Title	Role	Notes
1983	The Outsiders	Greaser in Concession Stand	
1995	Project: Metalbeast	Agent Berger	
2003	Out of Time	Living Gift Salesman	
2006	Larry the Cable Guy: Health Inspector	Tad	
2011	Battle Los Angeles	Reporter on TV	
2012	Hell and Mr. Fudge	Simon Clarage	
2014	Dolphin Tale 2	Mel Prince	
2015	Paper Towns	Mr. Spiegelman	
2019	Marriage Killer	Principal Brightman	

=== Television ===
Year	Title	Role	Notes
2001	Sheena	Ben	Episode: "Marabunta"
2002	CSI: Crime Scene Investigation	Special Agent Sackheim	Episode: "Cross Jurisdictions"
2002	America's Most Wanted	Detective Lee	Episode: "Jesus Maldonado"
2003-2004	CSI: Miami	Special Agent Sackheim	2 episodes
2006	South Beach	Doctor	Episode: "It Looked Like Somebody's Nightmare"
2007	K-Ville	Dr. Schmidt	Episode: "Melissa"
2008	Recount	Brad Blakeman	TV movie
2008	One Tree Hill	Lon	Episode: "Choosing My Own Way of Life"
2008	Army Wives	Dr. Harwood	3 episodes
2009	Ace Ventura Jr.: Pet Detective	Trooper	TV movie
2010	Burn Notice	Lieutenant Briggs	Episode: "Dead or Alive"
2014	Star-Crossed	Mr. Montrose	4 episodes
2014	Resurrection	Principal Hayes	Episode: "Multiple"
2014	Sleepy Hollow	Richard Weiss	Episode: "Go Where I Send Thee"
