= CSI: Miami season 1 =

Season of American television series CSI: Miami

CSI: Miami
- Season 1
- DVD cover
- Starring: David Caruso; Emily Procter; Adam Rodriguez; Khandi Alexander; Rory Cochrane; Kim Delaney
- No. of episodes: 24

Release
- Original network: CBS
- Original release: September 23, 2002 – May 19, 2003

Season chronology
- Next → Season 2

The first season of CSI: Miami premiered on CBS on September 23, 2002, and ended on May 19, 2003. The show's regular time slot was Mondays at 10:00 pm. The series stars David Caruso, Emily Procter, and Kim Delaney.

== Cast and characters ==
=== Main characters ===
- Lieutenant Horatio "H" Caine (David Caruso); an explosives and armaments specialist who was fundamental in establishing CSI in 1997. He recently became Director of the MDPD Crime Lab, after several years as a Supervisor.
- Lieutenant Megan Donner (Kim Delaney); the previous Director of the MDPD Crime Lab returning from six months' extended leave. She is Horatio's partner, though the two have a professional rivalry. (Episodes 1–10)
- Detective Calleigh Duquesne (Emily Procter); a ballistics specialist and a founding member of Crime Scene Investigations. She's worked in the lab since 1997, also specializing in DNA recovery.
- Detective Eric Delko (Adam Rodriguez); the newest member of the CSI team, joining in early 2002. He's a finger-print and drugs specialist who has recently completed his probationary patrol period.
- Detective Timothy 'Tim' "Speed" Speedle (Rory Cochrane); a Senior Detective hired at the recommendation of Jesse Cardoza in the late '90s. He is a specialist in trace and impressions.
- Assistant Chief Medical Examiner Dr. Alexx Woods (Khandi Alexander); a Miami Dade County Coroner who works alongside the Day Shift CSIs. She is extremely compassionate and oftentimes speaks to dead bodies.

=== Special guest appearances ===
- Sofia Milos as Detective Yelina Salas; Horatio's sister-in-law and a senior Robbery-Homicide Division (RHD) Detective assigned to assist the CSI's.
- Rex Linn as Detective Frank Tripp; a senior Robbery-Homicide Division (RHD) Detective assigned to assist the CSI's.

=== Guest starring ===
- Wanda de Jesus as Adelle Sevilla; an MDPD Robbery-Homicide Division (RHD) Detective assigned to assist the CSI's.
- Holt McCallany as John Hagen; a senior MDPD Robbery-Homicide Division (RHD) Detective assigned to assist the CSI's.
- Michael Whaley as Bernstein; an MDPD Robbery-Homicide Division (RHD) Detective assigned to assist the CSI's.

== Episodes ==
No. overall	No. in season	Title	Directed by	Written by	Original release date	Prod. code	US viewers (millions)
1	1	"Golden Parachute"	Joe Chappelle	Steven Maeda	September 23, 2002	101	23.10
Megan Donner returns to the CSI unit in time to work on a jet crash in the Everglades. While searching for survivors, they inexplicably discover a female victim found five miles from the crash site. When the only survivor says the woman opened the plane's hatch in order to commit suicide, Horatio is suspicious. The team must now recreate what happened on that fatal flight, especially when the pieces do not quite fit together.
2	2	"Losing Face"	Joe Chappelle	Steven Maeda & Gwendolyn M. Parker	September 30, 2002	104	19.80
A necklace bomb explodes, killing a man and a good friend of Horatio's. With his friend (and mentor) gone, Horatio works doubly hard in this case, worrying Megan, who lost her husband in the line of duty. With three more bombs, they are put to the test to find out who is doing it and who are the targets. With evidence in hand, they search a Colombian port and discover things about the workers that they think will help the case. However, new evidence suggests that the bomber is after the bomb squad.
3	3	"Wet Foot/Dry Foot"	Tucker Gates	Eddie Guerra	October 7, 2002	102	17.18
Horatio and his crew investigate the discovery of a man's partial torso by a group of fisherman who slit open a shark they caught, only to have the man's remains spill out. Megan soon realizes the man was murdered when she discovers a bullet wound on the corpse. Later, a second victim is found floating in an inner tube.
4	4	"Just One Kiss"	Scott Brazil	Laurie McCarthy & Matt Witten	October 14, 2002	103	19.03
A dead man with a slit throat and a partially burned face is discovered on a Miami beach, along with an unconscious young girl who was beaten and thrown into the ocean. The investigation leads Horatio to a prominent Florida family and its steely patriarch, who was once involved in a mysterious case that has plagued Horatio for years.
5	5	"Ashes to Ashes"	Bryan Spicer	Mark Israel	October 21, 2002	105	18.54
When a priest is found dead in his rectory after being brutally shot, Megan, Calleigh and Speedle must untangle a messy web of familial issues that lead to his death. Elsewhere, Horatio and Eric attempt to solve the emotional case of an exploded vehicle, which was home to a mother with child.
6	6	"Broken"	Deran Sarafian	Ildy Modrovich & Laurence Walsh	October 28, 2002	106	18.75
The whole team investigates the crime scene of an indoor amusement park when a young girl is found suffocated in the bathroom. They must track down the relentless man responsible for the heinous crime quicker than usual, as everyone on location has been detained until they can be cleared. What looks to be like a regular attempted kidnapping turns out to be much more than any of the detectives had bargained for.
7	7	"Breathless"	Charlie Correll	Steven Maeda & Gwendolyn Parker	November 4, 2002	107	17.94
The naked body of a male stripper who performed during a private party at a Coconut Grove estate is found the next morning in a nearby rose garden, and the CSIs have difficulty determining the cause of death. Meanwhile, Megan and Eric investigate the case of a male swimmer who suddenly dropped dead from a stab wound after climbing aboard a boat seven miles out in the Atlantic.
8	8	"Slaughterhouse"	Dick Pearce	Laurie McCarthy	November 11, 2002	108	20.06
Horatio and his team must uncover the evidence in the brutal murder of an entire family in their own home. The only survivors are a blood-soaked toddler, and the father who is in surgery. The immediate assumption is that the mother is responsible—postpartum depression—but the evidence discloses a shocking, different outcome.
9	9	"Kill Zone"	Daniel Attias	Mark Israel & Lois Johnson	November 18, 2002	109	17.16
A sniper is targeting downtown Miami and Horatio and his team must rush to stop the killer before he strikes again.
10	10	"A Horrible Mind"	Greg Yaitanes	Ildy Modrovich & Laurence Walsh	November 25, 2002	110	18.84
Horatio, Speedle and Calleigh root through the evidence in the homicide of a strange, unorthodox college professor when they find him tortured and hung onto a tree. Their suspicions are immediately directed towards his thirteen cult-like students. Elsewhere, Delko and Megan investigate a car found in the water with a dead body in the trunk, and immediately suspect an insurance scam.
11	11	"Camp Fear"	Deran Sarafian	Eddie Guerra & Steven Maeda	December 16, 2002	111	18.16
The CSIs investigate the death of a young model, whose body was found near a juvenile detention camp for girls. Across town, Delko and Speedle probe the bizarre death of a man who was apparently burned from the inside. Meanwhile, unable to handle the job anymore and feeling that it reminds her of her dead husband's work, Lieutenant Donner resigns from the team for good, leaving Horatio a note.
12	12	"Entrance Wound"	David Grossman	Laurie McCarthy & Gwendolyn M. Parker	January 6, 2003	112	17.52
A married man and his co-worker looking for a little extracurricular fun have their ardor drowned when they find a dead woman—a prostitute—in their bungalow, which leads to a family man who has been hiding a shady past. The team handles a car jacking in which a German tourist was killed, but the circumstances look more like murder as the wife was left unharmed after the shooting.
13	13	"Bunk"	Charlie Correll	Elizabeth Devine	January 27, 2003	113	16.87
The team investigate the manufacture of lethal drugs at mobile labs, and an elderly woman is murdered at a senior home.
14	14	"Forced Entry"	Artie Mandelberg	Mark Israel & Lois Johnson	February 3, 2003	114	18.17
A nude man is found tied to his bed, having suffocated while he was being sexually assaulted. Concurrently, a crematorium owner is found murdered. When they investigate, they discover dozens of bodies that were never cremated.
15	15	"Dead Woman Walking"	Jeannot Szwarc	Ildy Modrovich & Laurence Walsh	February 10, 2003	115	17.51
A mugger is found dead on the street, his neck broken. But Horatio's team has a bigger problem on their hands as during the autopsy, Alexx and Horatio realize the man was exposed to radiation. Now the team must race against time to find the man's killer before the next victim, an environmental lawyer, dies from radiation poisoning.
16	16	"Evidence of Things Unseen"	Joe Chappelle	David Black	February 17, 2003	116	18.32
The team investigate a Russian immigrant who is stabbed to death. The only witness to the crime was a stripper who was performing for him.
17	17	"Simple Man"	Greg Yaitanes	Steven Maeda	February 24, 2003	117	19.11
Before Horatio is set to testify at a murder case in which the defendant is the husband of a city councilwoman, he's given new facts that could prove the man is innocent. There is also new information which revolves around the discovery of a second victim who would match the alleged killer's profile—if the man on trial isn't guilty.
18	18	"Dispo Day"	David Grossman	Story by : Ildy Modrovich & Laurence Walsh; Teleplay by : Elizabeth Devine	March 10, 2003	118	18.95
The investigation into a drug heist offers brief glimpses into the private lives of the CSIs, whose nerves are on edge when they become suspects in the crime they are trying to solve.
19	19	"Double Cap"	Joe Chappelle	Marc Dube	March 31, 2003	119	16.97
Horatio battles the FBI and U.S. Marshals as he tries to uncover why a beautiful woman was murdered poolside at a ritzy hotel. Evidence suggests it was a professional hit, and the case becomes really puzzling when the feds take an interest. Elsewhere, Calleigh confronts her dad about his drinking problem.
20	20	"Grave Young Men"	Peter Markle	Lois Johnson	April 14, 2003	120	14.90
Horatio is approached by a parolee he helped put away several years ago, who begs for the lawman's assistance in finding his missing teenage son. As the investigation gets underway, Horatio discovers that the boy may be planning a deadly assault. Elsewhere, Speedle becomes attracted to a sexy model who may be involved in her boyfriend's death.
21	21	"Spring Break"	Deran Sarafian	Steven Maeda	April 28, 2003	121	17.18
Horatio and his crew investigate the deaths of two college students who were in Miami on spring break. The first is a teen girl found dead on a beach with her neck broken and human bite marks on her legs. The second is a young man found on the bottom of a motel swimming pool who apparently died before he hit the water.
22	22	"Tinder Box"	Charlie Correll	Corey Miller	May 5, 2003	122	14.46
Speedle and Delko are present when a trendy nightclub catches fire, apparently from a DJ's pyrotechnics display, killing 16 people and injuring dozens of others. But the ensuing investigation reveals it may have been arson to cover up a murder. Also: Horatio probes the death of a prostitute who is found dead in a judge's bathroom in his home.
23	23	"Freaks and Tweaks"	Deran Sarafian	Story by : John Haynes; Teleplay by : Elizabeth Devine	May 12, 2003	123	17.23
An explosion in a rundown barn nearly kills Horatio and his crew just after they find a dead man inside, bound with duct tape. The case gets personal for Horatio when it is discovered that the leading suspect knew his late brother. At the lab, Alexx is shocked to learn that her best friend's husband has been murdered, apparently the victim of a random shooting.
24	24	"Body Count"	Joe Chappelle	Story by : Steven Maeda; Teleplay by : Idly Modrovich & Laurence Walsh	May 19, 2003	124	19.30
The trouble begins when an inmate is stabbed to death in the prison yard. Shortly after Horatio arrives on the scene, a helicopter appears above the correctional facility. He immediately fears that the murder was a decoy to set up an escape. That's confirmed as three prisoners hop aboard the chopper and flee. As the investigation gets underway, the identities of the fugitives become known and a horrible realization sweeps over Horatio: Two of the escapees are cold-blooded killers who already have their next victims picked out.
