= Golden Parachute (CSI: Miami) =

- CSI: Miami episode
- Episode no.: Season 1 Episode 1
- Directed by: Joe Chappelle
- Written by: Steve Maeda
- Production code: 101
- Original air date: September 23, 2002

Guest appearances
- Julie Dretzin; Tim Sampson; Michael McGrady; Sam Anderson; Anne Betancourt; William Haze; David Labiosa; Bhetty Waldron; Michael Canavan

Episode chronology
← Previous —	Next → "Losing Face"

"Golden Parachute" is the first episode of the first season of the American crime drama CSI: Miami. The episode first aired on September 23, 2002 on CBS. This was the first of only 10 episodes featuring Kim Delaney as Megan Donner.

== Summary ==
Two men are fishing in the Everglades when they hear a plane approaching too loudly. The plane flies by, smoking, and crashes into the water. Horatio and Eric then arrive in an airboat looking for survivors. After a brief debate with NTSB over procedure, they find a survivor. Delko tries to save him, but he dies.

Back on shore, Calleigh gives Horatio information about the flight while Eric continues to look for body parts and money floating in the water. Megan Donnor arrives and meets with Tim Speedle. He welcomes her back but she wants to get to work. Megan discusses procedure with Horatio who stands his ground. He apologizes for having her job. Alexx is putting pieces of the victims together and finds what appears to be a bullet hole in one of them. She tells Horatio who asks Calleigh to find the bullet in the wreckage. A detective interviews one of the anglers as Speedle listens. Speedle tells Megan about the angler's poaching rifle. Eric dives for evidence while Speedle documents it. Horatio shows Megan what appears to be shoddy equipment from the plane. As Eric and Speedle bicker, Horatio finds an undamaged seat belt and an empty briefcase. Eric yells out that he has found someone still alive.

While the paramedics are taking the survivor, Horatio notices the man did not wear his seat belt. Megan tells Horatio about a dead woman, 5 miles out. Alexx examines the new body and wonders how she got so far from wreckage. Alexx determines that the dead woman also did not wear her seatbelt and that her clothes are very expensive. Horatio zones in on some marks on the victim's hand. Horatio talks with the dead woman's mother. As Calleigh searches for the bullet, she finds suspicious damage to the plane's door. Speedle fills Horatio in on what the passengers of the plane were doing. Calleigh tells them the door opened during the flight, which explains how the dead woman fell so far away.

The plane was bringing a group of company executives to Washington, D.C. to meet the SEC. Horatio interrogates the plane's technician and finds out the door did not come off by itself; someone opened it. Megan and Horatio question the survivor. He suggests the dead woman committed suicide. As Eric and Speedle argue about Megan; Eric says Megan walked right back in after being gone so long, but Speedle tells him her husband died. Horatio and Megan recreate a scene in the plane. They determine that the dead woman had been thrown out of the plane. Eric and Speedle find out the angler had stolen the plane's black box and quickly nab it from the angler's alligator pond. On the black box, they hear the crash, but no gunshot. They also hear the dead woman screaming for help.

Speedle looks into the victim's life, Calleigh looks for the bullet, and Eric tries to find out how the plane crashed. Speedle concludes that the victim did not commit suicide, Calleigh discovers a rivet, not a bullet, had hit the pilot, and Eric finds a very expensive woman's shoe in the plane's engine. They recreate the scene again but cannot prove the survivor killed the woman. Horatio remembers the marks on the woman's hand and links them to a fire extinguisher the survivor used to break the woman's grip on the door. The survivor killed the woman because she was a whistleblower to the fraud the company committed. They find the survivor at his house after he hangs himself. Horatio gives the victim's mother a damaging letter her daughter wrote about the survivor and the others from the crash.

== See also ==
- List of CSI: Miami episodes

== Notes ==
- Parts of the episode are similar to the incident of ValuJet Flight 592, which occurred 6 years before.

== Reviews ==
- Robert Bianco (September 23, 2002). "Case closed: Caruso's intensity powers 'CSI: Miami'". USA Today. p. D03.
- Caryn James (September 23, 2002). "How to Fight Lawlessness? Subdivide Crime Shows". The New York Times. p. E6.
