= SkyOne Federal Credit Union =

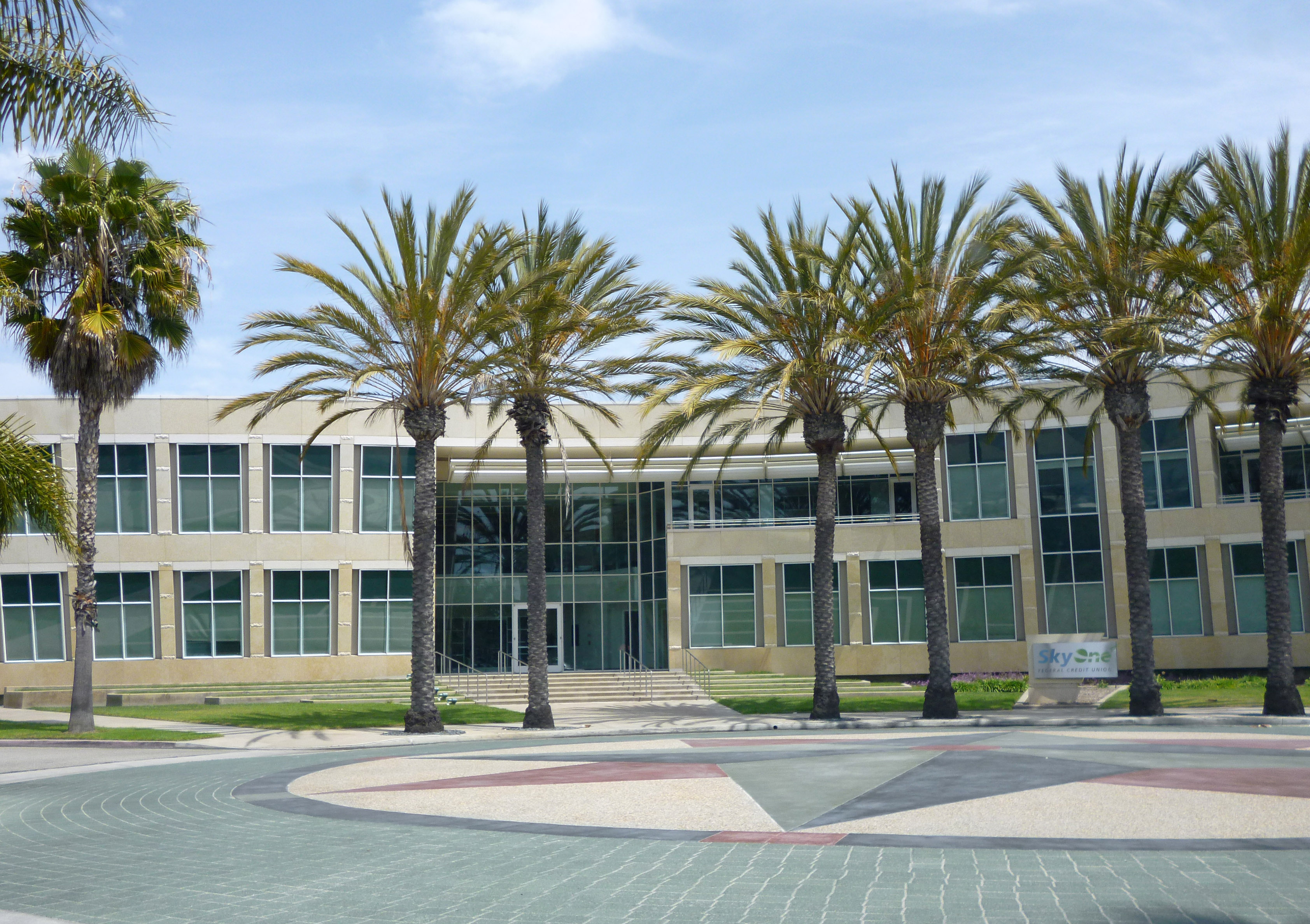
- SkyOne headquarters in Hawthorne
- Type: Credit union
- Industry: Financial services
- Founded: 1949; 77 years ago
- Headquarters: Hawthorne, California, United States
- Key people: Joseph Whitaker (President/CEO), Theodore P. Byrne (Chairman)
- Products: Savings; checking; consumer loans; mortgages; credit; Certificates; IRAs; and Financial Planning.
- Website: www.skyone.org

SkyOne Federal Credit Union is an American credit union that serves employees working in the aeronautics and space sector and their relatives. The credit union is headquartered in Hawthorne, California and is federally insured by the National Credit Union Administration and is an Equal Housing Lender. It offers financial services to all who qualify.

== History ==
SkyOne Federal Credit Union was founded in July 1949 as CAA First Federal Credit Union with eight members consisting of Civil Aeronautics Administration employees and their dependents. In 1978, the credit union changed its name from CAA to FAA and was serving FAA employees in 13 Western states.

In January 2010 FAA First FCU changed its name to SkyOne FCU. The new branding helped the credit union to better identify with its membership which was open to those working in the air transportation industry.

As of 2024, SkyOne FCU had $1 billion in assets and over 60,000 members worldwide.

== Membership ==
SkyOne's field of membership is set by the National Credit Union Administration. As with all credit unions, membership in SkyOne used to be limited to individuals sharing the common bond defined in its credit union charter. Membership in SkyOne is no longer limited to air transportation employees and their dependents who live and work in the United States. Anyone in good standing with ChexSystems can join by selecting either CA PTA, Surfrider Foundation, American Consumer Council, or Friends of Madrona Marsh when applying. Members must also be in good standing with SkyOne Federal Credit Union.

== Services ==
SkyOne offers account services offered by most financial institutions, including checking and savings accounts, individual retirement accounts, money market accounts, auto and motorcycle loans, personal loans, lines of credit options, real estate loans, mortgage loans, home equity loans, certificates, and credit cards. The company also provides online and mobile banking, insurance, financial planning, investment, and online bill pay options.

== Awards and recognition ==
- 2014: Received the Marketing award from the Internet Marketing Association.
- 2015: Awarded for outstanding communications by the Marketing Association of Credit Unions
- 2016: Honored with a Diamond award by the Credit Union National Association.

The SkyOne FCU building was used as the exterior shots of the Miami-Dade Crime Lab in CSI: Miami from 2002 to 2012. This is where the building got its most notable recognition.
