= Sunil Nayar =

Sunil Nayar is an Indian American television writer and producer, most notable for his work on CSI: Miami. For its third season onward, Nayar has been appointed main-showrunner and executive producer of the ABC television series Revenge. He currently oversees two CBS Television Studios/Warner Bros. Television co-productions The Red Line and All Rise.

== TV work includes ==
- Oz
  - "Next Stop, Valhalla" (2002)
  - "Wheel of Fortune" (2002)
  - "See No Evil, Hear No Evil, Smell No Evil" (2003)
  - "Sonata da Oz" (2003)
  - "A Day in the Death..." (2003)
- CSI: Miami:
  - "Complications" (2004)
  - "Innocent" (2004)
  - "Murder in a Flash" (2004)
  - "Speed Kills" (2004)
  - "Shootout" (2005)
  - "Money Plane" (2005)
  - "Vengeance" (2005)
  - "Blood in the Water" (2005)
  - "Under Suspicion" (2005)
  - "Silencer" (2006)
  - "Rampage" (2006)
  - "Rio" (2006)
  - "Curse of the Coffin" (2006)
  - "Triple Threat" (2007)
  - "Born to Kill" (2007)
  - "Inside Out" (2007)
  - "Raising Caine" (2007)
  - "Down to the Wire" (2008)
  - "The DeLuca Motel" (2008)
  - ”Flightrisk” (2009)
- Three Rivers
  - ”Good Intentions” (2009)
  - ”Case Histories” (2010)
- Body of Proof
  - "Buried Secrets" (2011)
  - "Hard Knocks" (2011)
  - "Sympathy for the Devil" (2012)
- Revenge
  - "Forgiveness" (2012)
  - "Collusion" (2013)
  - "Masquerade" (2013)
  - "Fear" (2013)
  - "Exodus" (2013)
  - "Payback" (2014)
  - "Revolution" (2014)
  - "Execution" (2014)
  - "Renaissance" (2014)
- The Red Line
  - "I Must Tell You What We Have Inherited" (2019)
- All Rise
  - "Sweet Bird of Truth" (2019)
  - "Uncommon Women and Mothers" (2019)
- 4400
  - "Group Efforts" (2022)
  - "Present is Prologue" (2022)
