= David Caruso =

American actor and producer (born 1956)

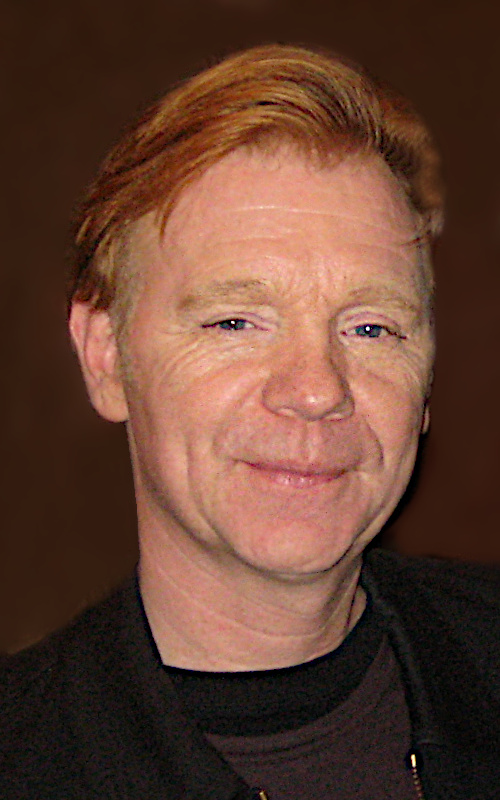
- Caruso at the 2008 Emmy Awards
- Born: David Stephen Caruso; January 7, 1956 (age 70); New York City, U.S.
- Occupations: Actor; television producer
- Years active: 1975–2012
- Known for: Horatio Caine on CSI: Miami; John Kelly on NYPD Blue
- Spouses: Cheri Maugans (m. 1979; div. 1984) Rachel Ticotin (m. 1984; div. 1987) Margaret Buckley (m. 1996; div. 2007)
- Partner: Liza Marquez (separated)
- Children: 3

David Stephen Caruso (born January 7, 1956) is a retired American actor and producer, best known for his roles as Detective John Kelly on the ABC crime drama NYPD Blue (1993–1994) and Lieutenant Horatio Caine on the CBS series CSI: Miami (2002–2012). Caruso appeared in the feature films An Officer and a Gentleman (1982), First Blood (1982, the first film in the Rambo franchise), Twins (1988), King of New York (1990), Hudson Hawk (1991), Kiss of Death (1995), and Proof of Life (2000).

== Early life ==
David Stephen Caruso was born on January 7, 1956, in Forest Hills, Queens, New York, New York, the son of Joan, a librarian, and Charles Caruso, a magazine and newspaper editor. He is of Irish and Italian (Sicilian & Neapolitan) descent. Charles left the family when David was two years old, resulting in him "end[ing] up fathering myself." Raised as a Roman Catholic, Caruso attended Our Lady Queen of Martyrs Catholic School in Forest Hills, then Archbishop Molloy High School in nearby Briarwood, graduating in 1974.

Caruso worked as a cinema usher, where he claimed to have seen up to 80 movies a week. Caruso said that he and his co-workers would act out scenes from some of these movies while they were at the back of the theater. In this job, Caruso found his role models in Humphrey Bogart, James Cagney and Edward G. Robinson. He said:

"The ethics of certain actors certainly had a power over me. These guys taught me how to be what I consider the real scum of the earth."

== Career ==
=== 1980s ===
Caruso's first movie appearance was in the 1980 film Getting Wasted as Danny. He credits his role as Topper Daniels, "the cadet who nearly drowned", in An Officer and a Gentleman (1982) as what got him noticed. In First Blood (1982), the first installment of the Rambo franchise, Caruso played Deputy Mitch Rogers, the youngest and only sympathetic member of Sheriff Teasle's (Brian Dennehy) department, who protests the abuse of John Rambo (Sylvester Stallone) but is unable to prevent it and is later wounded by Rambo during the forest pursuit. Caruso spent the rest of the decade in supporting roles in films including Blue City (1986), China Girl (1987) and Twins (1988).

On television, Caruso had a recurring role as Tommy Mann, leader of the street gang The Shamrocks, in seven episodes of the NBC police drama series Hill Street Blues (1981–83). He portrayed U.S. Olympian James Brendan Connolly in the 1984 miniseries, The First Olympics: Athens 1896, and also appeared in two episodes of the series Crime Story.

Caruso featured in the music video for the song "Voyage, voyage" by the French singer Desireless, released in 1986.

=== 1990s ===
Caruso had supporting roles as a police officer in the crime films King of New York (1990) and Mad Dog and Glory (1993). While filming 1991's Hudson Hawk, he employed method acting, refusing to talk to anyone on set because his character, Kit-Kat, was mute, having had his tongue bitten off.

In 1993, Caruso landed his first major role as Detective John Kelly in the police procedural series NYPD Blue, for which he won a Golden Globe Award. TV Guide named Caruso as one of the six new stars to watch in the 1993–1994 season. He made news by leaving the highly rated show the following year (only four episodes into the second season) after failing to obtain the raise he wanted. Caruso's decision to leave the series would later be listed in a 2010 issue of TV Guide as #6 on a list of TV's 10 biggest "blunders".

Caruso was unable to establish himself as a leading man in films. His appearances in the 1995 thrillers Kiss of Death and Jade were met with a negative reception from critics, with both films receiving mixed reviews and poor box-office takings, and Caruso was nominated for the Golden Raspberry Award for Worst New Star for these two roles.

In 1997, Caruso returned to television as a New York City-based federal prosecutor in the short-lived CBS law drama series Michael Hayes, which aired for one season.

=== 2000s and CSI: Miami ===
Caruso returned to film with a supporting role as Russell Crowe's mercenary associate in Proof of Life (2000). In 2001, Caruso had a lead role in the cult psychological horror film Session 9, directed by Brad Anderson. Dave Kehr, writing in The New York Times, praises his performance, stating that "it is good to see David Caruso back in action, with a little more technique and a little less ego."

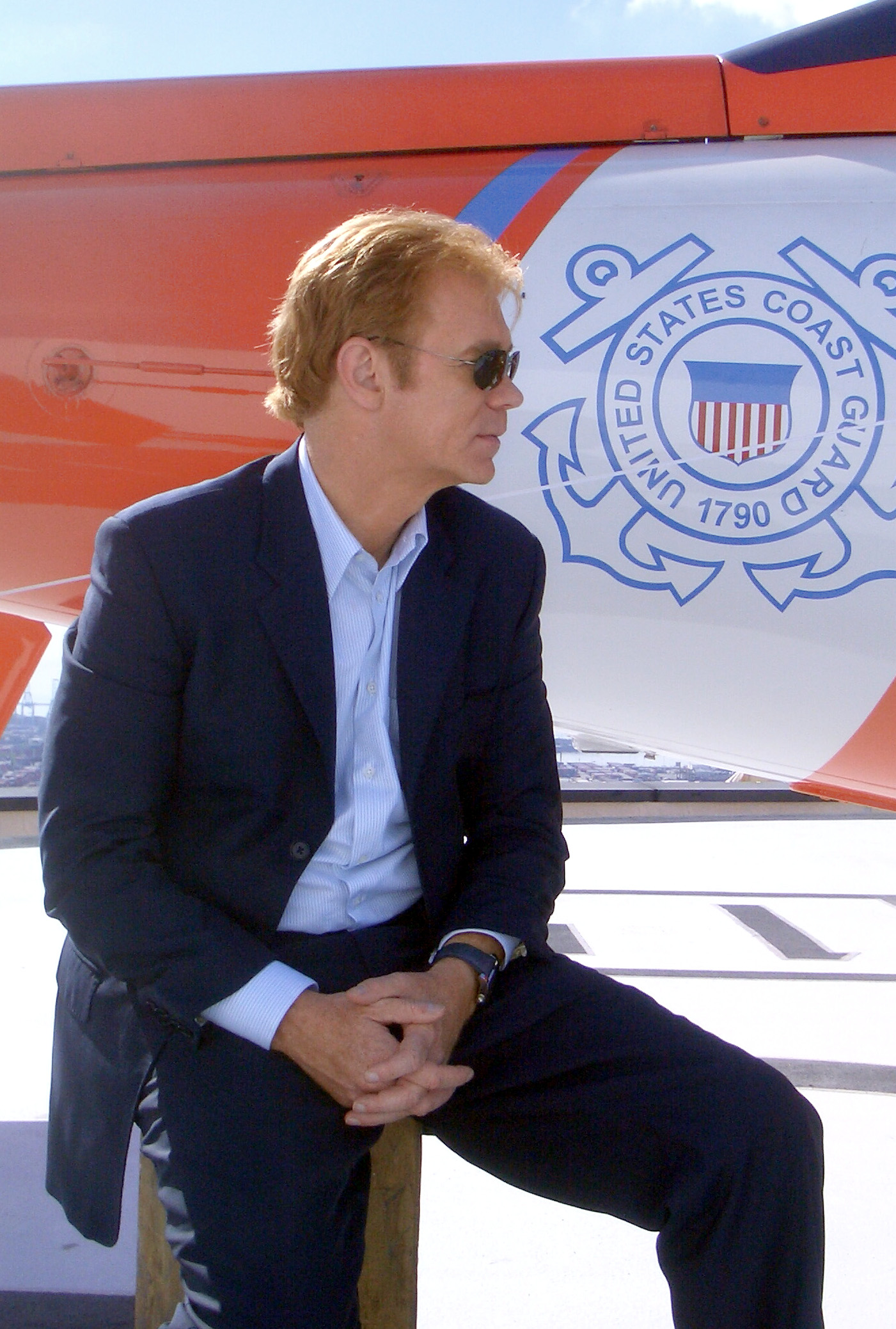
Caruso as Horatio Caine in November 2004

In 2002, Caruso returned to television in his first successful role since NYPD Blue, starring as police Lieutenant Horatio Caine in the CSI spin-off series CSI: Miami. Caruso was the first actor in the franchise to appear as the same character on three of the five CSI programs. He was known for frequently using one-liners at the beginning of each episode. Many of these include Caruso putting on his trademark sunglasses mid-sentence, then walking off-screen just as the main theme starts. On an episode of the Late Show with David Letterman that aired on March 8, 2007, actor and comedian Jim Carrey professed to being a fan of the show and went on to do an impersonation of Caruso, asking for an "intense close-up" from the camera, speaking in a raspy voice and putting on sunglasses. Caruso later said in an interview with CBS that he was impressed with the impersonation.

In 2012, CSI: Miami was cancelled after 10 seasons due to a decline in ratings and the climbing cost of production. Caruso was the only actor to appear in all 232 episodes of the series.

=== After acting ===
After CSI: Miami, Caruso quietly retired from acting and became involved in the art business. He is the founder of DavidCarusoTelevision.tv and LexiconDigital.tv. Caruso is also the co-owner of Steam on Sunset, a clothing store in South Miami.

== Personal life ==
Caruso was married to his first wife Cheri Maugans from 1979 until they divorced in 1984. Caruso was married to his second wife Rachel Ticotin from 1984 to 1987, with whom he has a daughter, Greta.

Margaret Buckley was married to Caruso from 1996 to 2007. Caruso and former girlfriend Liza Marquez have two children together: Marquez and Paloma. In April 2009, Marquez filed papers against Caruso for fraud, breach of their settlement agreement, and emotional distress.

In March 2009, a woman was placed in custody in Tyrol, Austria, on charges of stalking Caruso. She had twice failed to appear in court to answer the charges before fleeing to Mexico. Following her deportation from Mexico, Austrian officials took her into custody to await trial on the stalking charges.

== Awards and nominations ==
In 1994, Caruso won a Golden Globe Award for his John Kelly role on NYPD Blue for which he was also nominated for a Primetime Emmy Award for Outstanding Lead Actor in a Drama Series. In 2001, Caruso was nominated for the Blockbuster Entertainment Award for Favorite Supporting Actor – Suspense for his role as Dino in the film Proof of Life.

== Filmography ==
=== Film ===
| Year | Title | Role | Notes |
|---|---|---|---|
| 1980 | Getting Wasted | Danny | |
| 1980 | Without Warning | Tom | |
| 1982 | An Officer and a Gentleman | 'Topper' Daniels | |
| 1982 | First Blood | Deputy Mitch Rogers | First film in the Rambo franchise |
| 1984 | Thief of Hearts | Buddy Calamara | |
| 1986 | Blue City | Joey Rayford | |
| 1987 | China Girl | 'Mercury' | |
| 1988 | Twins | Al Greco | |
| 1990 | King of New York | Detective Dennis Gilley | |
| 1991 | Hudson Hawk | 'Kit Kat' | |
| 1993 | Mad Dog and Glory | Mike | |
| 1995 | Kiss of Death | Jimmy Kilmartin | Nominated—Golden Raspberry Award for Worst New Star |
| 1995 | Jade | Lieutenant David Corelli | Nominated—Golden Raspberry Award for Worst New Star |
| 1997 | Cold Around the Heart | Ned Tash | |
| 1998 | Body Count | Hobbs | |
| 2000 | Proof of Life | Dino | Nominated—Blockbuster Entertainment Award for Favorite Supporting Actor – Suspense |
| 2001 | Session 9 | Phil | |
| 2001 | Black Point | John Hawkins | (final film role) |

=== Television ===
| Year | Title | Role | Notes |
|---|---|---|---|
| 1976 | Ryan's Hope | Bellboy (uncredited) | 1 episode (#378) |
| 1981 | Crazy Times | Bobby Shea | Television movie |
| 1981 | Palmerstown, U.S.A. | Donnie Muller | 2 episodes |
| 1981–1983 | Hill Street Blues | Shamrock Leader Tommy Mann | 7 episodes |
| 1983 | CHiPs | Charlie | Episode: "Hot Date" |
| 1983 | T. J. Hooker | Jennings | Episode: "Requiem for a Cop" |
| 1983 | The Paper Chase | Bennett | Episode: "Commitments" |
| 1983 | For Love and Honor | Private Rusty Burger | Episode: "Pilot" |
| 1984 | The First Olympics: Athens 1896 | James Connolly | Television miniseries |
| 1986–1988 | Crime Story | Johnny O'Donnell | 2 episodes |
| 1987 | Into the Homeland | Ryder | Television movie |
| 1990 | H.E.L.P. | Frank Sordoni | 6 episodes |
| 1990 | Parker Kane | Joey Torregrossa | Television movie |
| 1990 | Rainbow Drive | Larry Hammond | Television movie |
| 1991 | Mission of the Shark: The Saga of the U.S.S. Indianapolis | Wilkes | Television movie |
| 1993 | Judgment Day: The John List Story | Chief Bob Richland | Television movie |
| 1993–1994 | NYPD Blue | Detective John Kelly | Main (Season 1–2) 26 episodes Golden Globe Award for Best Actor – Television Series Drama; Nominated—Primetime Emmy Award for Outstanding Lead Actor in a Drama Series; Nominated—Viewers for Quality Television Award for Best Actor in a Quality Drama Series |
| 1997 | Gold Coast | Maguire | Television movie |
| 1997–1998 | Michael Hayes | Michael Hayes | 21 episodes |
| 2000 | Deadlocked | Ned Stark | Television movie |
| 2002 | CSI: Crime Scene Investigation | Lieutenant Horatio Caine | Episode: "Cross Jurisdictions" |
| 2002–2012 | CSI: Miami | Lieutenant Horatio Caine | Main (10 Seasons) 232 episodes (final appearance) |
| 2005 | CSI: NY | Lieutenant Horatio Caine | Episode: "Manhattan Manhunt" |

=== Music videos ===
| Year | Title | Artist(s) | Ref. |
|---|---|---|---|
| 1986 | "Voyage, voyage" | Desireless | |

== See also ==
- List of people from Queens
