= CSI: Miami =

American police procedural drama TV series (2002–2012)

- Genre: Police procedural; Crime drama
- Created by: Anthony E. Zuiker; Ann Donahue; Carol Mendelsohn
- Starring: David Caruso; Emily Procter; Adam Rodriguez; Khandi Alexander; Rory Cochrane; Kim Delaney; Sofia Milos; Jonathan Togo; Rex Linn; Eva LaRue; Megalyn Echikunwoke; Eddie Cibrian; Omar Benson Miller
- Opening theme: "Won't Get Fooled Again" by The Who
- Composers: Jeff Cardoni; Kevin Kiner; Graeme Revell; Clint Mansell; Youssef Guezoum; Alexander Judd; David E. Russo
- Country of origin: United States
- Original language: English
- No. of seasons: 10
- No. of episodes: 232 (list of episodes)

Production
- Executive producers: Carol Mendelsohn; Jerry Bruckheimer; Anthony E. Zuiker; Ann Donahue; Barry O'Brien; Stephen Zito; Danny Cannon; Jonathan Littman; Nancy Miller; Sam Strangis; David Black; Sunil Nayar
- Producer: Marc Dube
- Running time: 39–45 minutes; ~63 minutes (2 episodes)
- Production companies: Jerry Bruckheimer Television; Alliance Atlantis (2002–2008); CBS Television Studios (Note: Known as CBS Productions from Seasons 1–4 and CBS Paramount Network Television from Seasons 5–7.)

Original release
- Network: CBS
- Release: September 23, 2002 – April 8, 2012

Related
- CSI: Crime Scene Investigation; CSI: NY; CSI: Cyber; CSI: Vegas; Cold Case; Without a Trace

CSI: Miami (Crime Scene Investigation: Miami) is an American police procedural television series that aired on CBS from September 23, 2002, to April 8, 2012. Featuring David Caruso as Lieutenant Horatio Caine, Emily Procter as Detective Calleigh Duquesne, and Adam Rodriguez as Detective Eric Delko, the series is the first direct spin-off of CSI: Crime Scene Investigation, "transplanting the same template and trickery—gory crimes, procedural plot and dazzling graphics—into a new city while retaining the essence of the original idea".

CSI: Miami was executive produced by Carol Mendelsohn, Anthony E. Zuiker, and Ann Donahue, with the latter acting as showrunner. The series ended on April 8, 2012, after 10 seasons and 232 episodes. Following the series finale, Nina Tassler credited CSI: Miami as a "key player in CBS's rise to the top", stating that the series "leaves an amazing television legacy—a signature look and style [and] global popularity". In 2006, BBC News published an article stating that CSI: Miami was the world's most popular television series, featuring in more countries' top ten rankings for 2005 than any other series.

On May 8, 2024, CBS announced that the series would be revived as a true-crime series known as The Real CSI: Miami, which premiered in June 2024.

David Caruso is the only actor to appear in all 232 episodes of the television series.

== Premise ==
CSI: Miami follows a group of detectives assigned to the Miami-Dade Police Department (MDPD for short)'s Crime Scene Investigations (CSI for short) Unit, an elite unit operating out of the (fictional) "Miami Dade police headquarters, with its eerie blue light and flickering screens".

The team is led by Lieutenant Horatio Caine (David Caruso), who, through his history as a bomb-disposal expert, has gained specialized knowledge in explosive forensics. Horatio believes that "evil is" and lives "between the perpetrators of this evil and the people who try and come between that evil and the citizen". In his pursuit of justice, he has proven that "he can handle himself on the street and he's not a person to be messed with".

The New York Sun has described Caine as an amalgam of "the spirits of all the laconic American law men who preceded him", while the New York Post describes Caine's partner Detective Calleigh Duquesne (Emily Procter) as "a bilingual Southern beauty with a specialty in ballistics".

Together, Caine and Duquesne head a team of forensic investigators that includes Lieutenant Megan Donner (Kim Delaney), conceived as "a strong woman [who could] duplicate the chemistry that Caruso displayed with Marg Helgenberger" during "Cross Jurisdictions", Detective Eric Delko (Adam Rodriguez), an underwater recovery expert, Walter Simmons (Omar Miller), a detective who forces the "CSIs to do more science and research instead of relying on databases", Los Angeles Police transfer Jesse Cardoza (Eddie Cibrian), former FBI agent Natalia Boa Vista (Eva LaRue), and Ryan Wolfe (Jonathan Togo), a master of genetics recruited following the death of Detective Timothy Speedle (Rory Cochrane). The team are assisted by Medical Examiner Alexx Woods (Khandi Alexander), who began her career as a medical Examiner in New York, and her replacement Tara Price (Megalyn Echikunwoke), Miami Dade Police Sergeant Frank Tripp (Rex Linn), and Horatio's sister-in-law, Detective Yelina Salas (Sofia Milos).

During their investigations, the team cooperate with both allies and nemeses, including Internal Affairs Lieutenant Rick Stetler (David Lee Smith), States Attorney Rebecca Nevins (Christina Chang), Medical Examiner Tom Loman (Christian Clemenson), and newly minted detective Sam Owens (Taylor Cole).

== Production ==
=== Concept and development ===
On April 17, 2002, CBS Television Studios announced plans to launch a series originally titled CSI: Miami-Dade, a spin-off to the hit procedural CSI. On the location choice, co-creator Carol Mendelsohn stated that "[she, Anthony E. Zuiker, and Ann Donahue] felt Miami was the most happening place [...] Miami is so rich as a character. There is so much water. There are so many different cultures here all colliding. Its politics are so interesting. All that gives Miami an edge."

CBS ordered 22 episodes of the series, with Anthony Zuiker stating that whilst he intended for the series to look "ridiculously gorgeous", he felt that the "show [was] not about women walking around in bikinis. It's about science." The series was launched as a second-season episode of CSI: Crime Scene Investigation, and originally featured a cast led by Caruso, Procter, Rodriguez, Alexander, with Cochrane. Delaney joined the series following the pilot episode's broadcast.

The series is executive produced by creators Carol Mendelsohn, Anthony E. Zuiker, and Ann Donahue, with Ann Donahue acting as show-runner. Jerry Bruckheimer also executive-produces the series. CSI: Crime Scene Investigation stars William Petersen and Marg Helgenberger expressed their displeasure at CBS' launch of Miami, with Petersen stating that "[they] should have waited five years for a CSI spinoff." Helgenberger supported Petersen's comments during an Emmy acceptance speech, noting that "as far as [she was] concerned, there's only one CSI." Petersen jestingly referred to the series NYPDCSI, as it initially featured both Caruso and Delaney, of NYPD Blue fame.

=== Casting ===
In 2002, CSI executive producer Anthony Zuiker began casting for the then-unnamed Miami based spin-off. First cast was Procter, as Calleigh Duquesne. Regarding her decision to leave The West Wing and join Miami, Procter stated that "It was like choosing between a boyfriend that wants to be with you casually or a man that says I love you." She described her character as "a weird girl [...] bright and very nerdy. She wears a lot of boot-cut corduroy pants and turquoise necklaces and looks like a hippie. I just like to pretend I'm Velma in Scooby-Doo."

Rodriguez, Cochrane, and Alexander were cast alongside Procter, completing the supporting ensemble. For the lead, CBS suggested Caruso. Zuiker, who stated that he had "heard about the NYPD Blue thing", was initially hesitant. Elaborating, Zuiker stated that he "sort of jumped in and said, 'Naw, I don't know about this guy. The show's tough enough to get off the ground and I don't want to walk into any problems."

CBS president Les Moonves had announced in January that a Miami spin-off was imminent, yet "It wasn't until we sort of, like, at the eleventh hour, really started to look at our options as to who was going to play Horatio, [Zuiker, Mendelsohn, and Donahue] revisited Caruso. And [they] said, 'Yeah, we'll have him come out for dinner, see what he's about.'" Caruso was later cast as Caine. He was the last pilot cast member to be contracted to series.

Following the back-door pilot, Zuiker stated that he believed the series "needed a little more balance in terms of a leading woman". Executives offered Sela Ward the part of Megan Donner, a lieutenant and Horatio's former boss. Ward turned down the role, and producers later cast Delaney (Ward would later take a role in the subsequent spin-off CSI: NY).

Ann Donahue described Delaney's casting as "a no-brainer", stating that "when Kim became available, we knew in a heartbeat that we wanted her." Zuiker elaborated, noting that "Kim brings a level of maturity, a level of balance with David Caruso [...] We just felt we were missing something in the whole picture – we needed a strong female in the cast." The New York Times reported that original lead Procter would "now follow Ms. Delaney in the credits."

In late 2002, despite receiving excellent feedback from producers, Delaney departed the cast after ten episodes. CBS issued a statement noting that Delaney's character had become less integral to the series as it progressed, "they had hoped to duplicate the sparks between William Petersen and Marg Helgenberger on the original CSI," noted EW, but Delaney and Caruso's chemistry was lackluster. Delaney's departure allowed for "younger Emily Procter's profile" to be raised to that of "leading female".

Sofia Milos was cast in a recurring role to "fill the void" supposed to have been created by Delaney's departure. In season three, Milos was promoted to series regular. TV Guide reported that Milos would depart after one season as a main cast member. Also in the third season, Jonathan Togo was cast as Ryan Wolfe, a character created to replace an unnamed "member of the CSI team" expected to "die in the line of duty". This cast member was later announced as Rory Cochrane.

On April 10, 2006, Ann Donahue announced that recurring cast members Rex Linn and Eva LaRue were also joining the main cast, after recurring since season one, and season four, respectively. The fourth main cast member to depart the series was Khandi Alexander, in the series' sixth season. Alexander was replaced by Megalyn Echikunwoke, who departed after a single season. Adam Rodriguez departed in season eight, though he returned in season nine. During Rodriguez's temporary departure, Eddie Cibrian appeared as a series regular, though in June 2010 he was let go from his contract. Omar Miller also joined the cast in season eight.

=== Locations ===
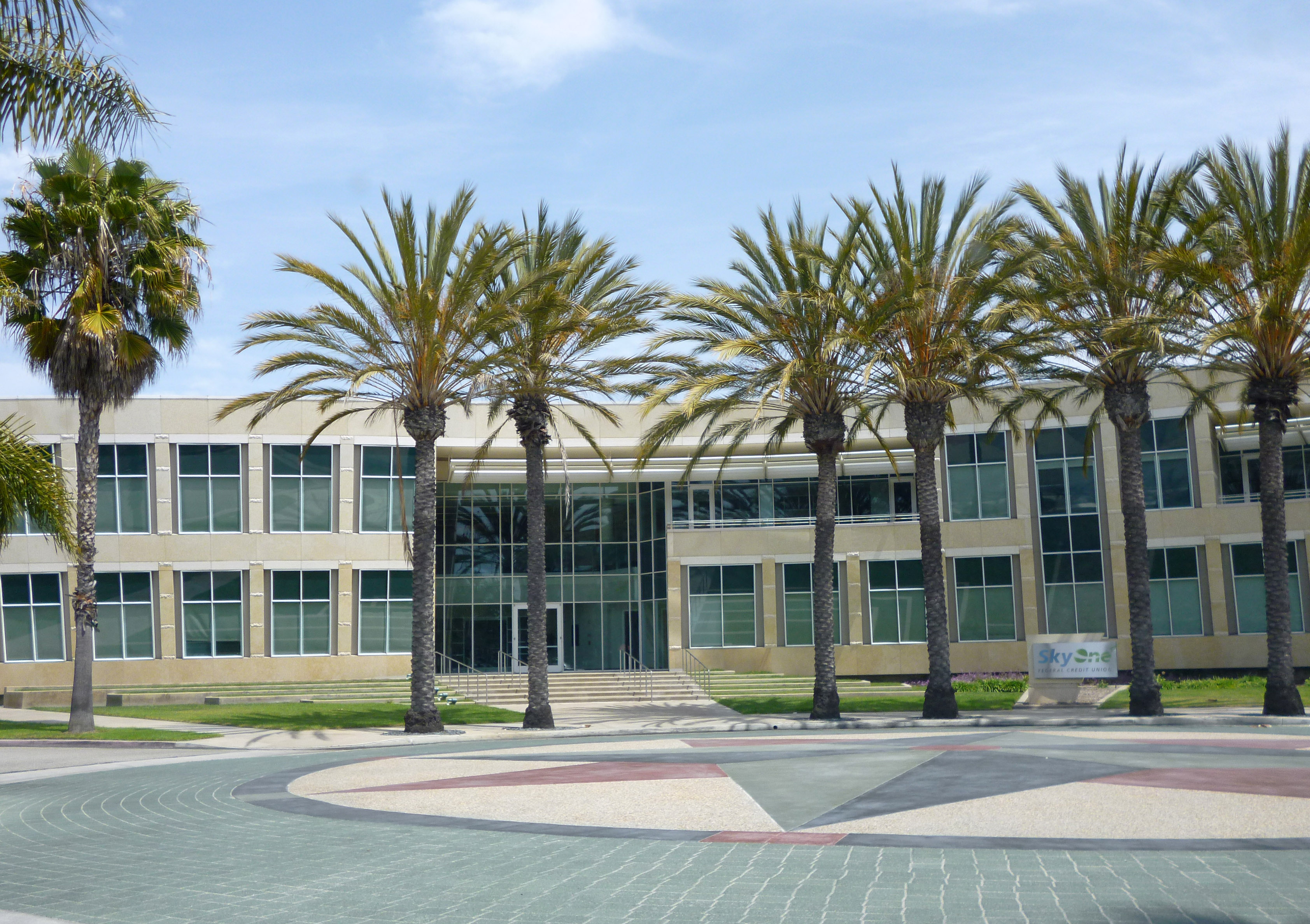
The SkyOne headquarters regularly used for exterior views of the crime lab.

CSI: Miami was filmed primarily in California. Indoor scenes were shot at Raleigh Manhattan Studios in Manhattan Beach, California. Most outdoor scenes were filmed in Long Beach, as well as portions of Manhattan Beach and Redondo Beach. Beach areas of Marina Green Park and Rainbow Lagoon Park in downtown Long Beach were often used for other outdoor scenes, as the newly constructed high-rise condos there gave the appearance of being in Miami.

The sculptured walkway paying tribute to the old Pike Roller Coaster can be seen in the background in the episodes "Wrecking Crew" and "Under The Influence". Footage from the Biscayne Courthouse, visible prominently in the episode "Recoil", among others, was filmed at the Water Garden Park in Santa Monica, at 34.028728, −118.471331.

Other locations around Long Beach are used, such as the Naples district, whose canals and upscale homes featuring large boat docks and palm trees impart a Miami-like atmosphere. The building used for exterior shots of the Miami-Dade Police Department crime lab is actually the SkyOne Federal Credit Union headquarters located at 14600 Aviation Boulevard in Hawthorne, California.

Many outdoor location shots were also filmed in Miami-Dade County, Florida, including Coconut Grove, Coral Gables, and Miami Beach.

=== Music ===
CSI: Miami's main theme is "Won't Get Fooled Again", written and performed by The Who, who also perform the theme songs of CSI: Crime Scene Investigation, CSI: NY, CSI: Cyber and CSI: Vegas. Prior to the opening credits, Horatio Caine delivers a "one-liner", or witticism, relating to the crime committed.

=== Cancellation ===
On February 1, 2012, CBS announced that the 10th season of CSI: Miami would have its episode order reduced to 19 episodes, in order to make room on the schedule for mid-season replacement NYC 22. On May 13, 2012, both series were canceled.

Procter later stated that "the cancellation was kind of shocking for everyone because they had given an indication that CSI: NY might go, so people would have been prepared and we just weren't prepared." Procter had previously commented on the longevity of the series, commenting that "I remember sitting around with David in the parking lot during season one, getting ready for the first episode to air. We said [...] 'we are going to spend the rest of our lives together. For better or worse.'" Eva LaRue later echoed Procter's sentiments, stating that she "was sad because we did not get a chance to say goodbye to the fans or to each other".

CBS Entertainment President Nina Tassler issued a statement noting that "when the slightly different budgets and ratings concerns for the CSI spin-offs were factored in, there was no distinction — at least in terms of numbers. They were very close, looking at them forensically, they were very close. It was an indiscernible difference . . . it was just a matter of looking at the schedule and what looked better". "In the end, NY won that particular duel simply because it features New York City, which helped CBS create a Friday night NYC-fest".

== Cast and characters ==
=== Main ===
- David Caruso as Horatio "H" Caine; the "iconic" director of the Miami Dade Crime Lab and a police lieutenant. Rising through the ranks as a bomb squad technician, Caine is an expert in explosive forensics and is incredibly protective of his team. He often goes to extraordinary lengths to save evidence or a potential victim. Throughout the course of the series, he becomes more jaded and less ethical, developing a far more serious, direct, and to-the-point attitude, though he maintains his ability to communicate well with children who have suffered traumatic ordeals. He is also a skilled marksman.
- Emily Procter as Calleigh Duquesne; a CSI Level 3 and Horatio's Assistant Supervisor. Duquesne is a veteran MDPD Detective and the longest serving member of the crime lab. She is a ballistics specialist. Her slight build, blonde hair, and Southern belle accent often lead others to underestimate her, but she is a brilliant and a dedicated scientist. She develops a romantic relationship with fellow CSI Eric Delko, and, in the show's final season, adopts two children.
- Adam Rodriguez as Eric Delko; a fingerprint and drug expert of Cuban and Russian descent. Detective Delko first encountered the CSI team while working as a tow-truck driver. Caine persuaded him to join the MDPD, and the two became good friends. Eric has three sisters. One of them, Marisol, married Caine and was killed at the end of season 4. Because of this he builds strong bonds where he works, developing a strong friendship with Tim Speedle, and a romantic interest in Calleigh. (seasons 1–8, 9–10; recurring: season 8)
- Khandi Alexander as Alexx Woods; a medical examiner for Miami Dade County. Alexx began her medical career in New York as a physician and became a medical examiner with the CSI team after moving to Miami for personal reasons. She is a very emotional person, and is more of a "mother" figure for the CSI team, showing great concern for them. She also often talks to the dead bodies. Alexx eventually leaves CSI in order to spend more time with the living. (seasons 1–6; guest star: seasons 7–8)
- Rory Cochrane as Tim Speedle, known affectionately as "Speed"; a trace evidence and impressions expert from Syracuse, New York. He worked for the St. Petersburg PD in 1997, and had a degree in biology from Columbia University. Speed joined the team at the recommendation of Jesse Cardoza, and became an invaluable asset. Speed often failed to comply to departmental standards, however, and was killed as a result of his badly cleaned weapon misfiring during a shootout. (seasons 1–3; guest star: season 6)
- Kim Delaney as Megan Donner; Horatio's first partner and a respected MDPD Police Lieutenant. She was the director of the MDPD Crime Lab prior to taking indefinite leave due to the death of her husband, who was killed in the line of duty. She believes in following the evidence, and as such is often seen as adversarial to Horatio's go-with-the-gut detective style. As a result of this, Megan resigns, finding the pressure of the job to now be more than she could handle. (season 1)
- Sofia Milos as Yelina Salas; a Colombian homicide detective frequently attached to CSI investigations, and the widow of Horatio's brother Raymond Caine. She later starts a relationship with IAB Sergeant Rick Stetler. Yelina leaves the team and moves to Rio with her family, although she later returns to Miami as a private investigator. (recurring: seasons 1–2; season 3; guest star: seasons 5–7)
- Jonathan Togo as Ryan Wolfe; a Detective attached to Horatio's team. Ryan was working as a police officer at the time he was hired for the lab by Caine, who noted Ryan's immaculate care of his gun, likely due to Wolfe having OCD. Ryan was replacing fallen CSI Tim Speedle, who died in the line of duty as a direct result of his poor gun maintenance. The team, and Eric in particular, are hostile to Ryan at first, though they later warm to him. (seasons 3–10; recurring: season 3)
- Rex Linn as Frank Tripp; a Texas-born homicide detective who accompanies the team to the crime scenes. He is known for interrogating suspects in his typical sarcastic manner and has a good working relationship with all the CSIs. He is divorced with three kids, and has known Horatio since at least 1997. Over the course of the series, he is promoted to sergeant, taking on a more prominent role within the MDPD, and spending a short time in uniform. (recurring: seasons 1–4; seasons 5–10)
- Eva LaRue as Natalia Boa Vista; an MDPD Detective and DNA specialist hired by Caine. Upon her arrival, she was only allowed to work on cold or unsolved cases due to the restrictions of her federal grant, although it is later revealed she is in fact an FBI Special Agent working undercover. She later applies to join the team permanently, much to the initial chagrin of Delko and Wolfe. She was a victim of domestic abuse during her marriage. (recurring: season 4; seasons 5–10)
- Megalyn Echikunwoke as Tara Price; the day-shift medical examiner who replaces Alexx following her departure. She is initially well received by the team, until she is shown to steal a bottle of Oxycodone (an opioid analgesic medication) from a victim in the morgue. Ryan Wolfe confronts Tara about the stolen pills in her locker, and she is later arrested and dismissed from the team. Tara is replaced shortly thereafter by Dr. Tom Loman. (season 7; recurring: season 7)
- Eddie Cibrian as Jesse Cardoza; an MDPD Detective who worked with Horatio and Megan prior to the formation of the CSI team. He returns to Miami following a stint as a LAPD officer in order to track the man who murdered his wife. Cardoza builds strong friendships within the team but is killed in the line of duty during a halon attack on the lab. Walter is particularly hurt by his loss. (season 8; guest star: season 9)
- Omar Benson Miller as Walter Simmons; "a Louisiana native and art theft specialist who transfers over from the night-shift to join Horatio's team". Simmons' large build is often intimidating to suspects. However, he is shown to be one of the most caring and compassionate members of the team. He is extremely close to both Ryan and Jesse, and develops a friendship with LVPD CSI Raymond Langston. (seasons 8–10; recurring: season 8)

=== Recurring ===
- Holt McCallany as John Hagen; a MPD Homicide Detective who had emotional and psychological problems. He was the partner of Caine's presumed-dead brother. Hagen kills himself in front of Calleigh. (seasons 1–3)
- Boti Bliss as Maxine Valera; a DNA technician who works on Caine's team. She is incredibly capable but has an unfortunate habit of taking shortcuts whilst processing evidence. (seasons 2–8)
- Johnny Whitworth as Jake Berkeley; originally an MDPD Narcotics Detective, Jake transfers to Homicide following a stint in undercover. He and Calleigh were in a relationship in the academy, and later rekindle this. (seasons 5–8)
- Christian Clemenson as Tom Loman: Miami's newest medical examiner and the second replacement for Dr. Alexx Woods. Loman is socially awkward but invaluable to the team, developing strong bonds throughout his tenure. (seasons 8–10)
- Taylor Cole as Samantha Owens; an MDPD Detective who is assigned to Horatio's CSI team. Formerly a lab technician, Owens develops a flirtatious relationship with Wolfe. (season 10)

== Episodes ==
Season	Episodes	Originally released		Rank	Viewers (in millions)
Season	Episodes	First released	Last released	Rank	Viewers (in millions)
Backdoor pilot		May 9, 2002		—N/a	—N/a
1	24	September 23, 2002	May 19, 2003	12	16.45
2	24	September 22, 2003	May 24, 2004	9	18.06
3	24	September 20, 2004	May 23, 2005	7	19.00
4	25	September 19, 2005	May 22, 2006	9	18.12
5	24	September 18, 2006	May 14, 2007	12	16.98
6	21	September 24, 2007	May 19, 2008	16	13.91
7	25	September 22, 2008	May 18, 2009	13	14.26
8	24	September 21, 2009	May 24, 2010	24	12.65
9	22	October 3, 2010	May 8, 2011	27	11.75
10	19	September 25, 2011	April 8, 2012	36	10.84

=== Crossover with CSI: NY ===
On Monday November 7, 2005, and Wednesday November 9, 2005, CBS aired the first crossover within the CSI franchise, with a CSI: Miami episode titled "Felony Flight", and a CSI: NY episode titled "Manhattan Manhunt". The episodes see an escaped prisoner embark on a killing "spree that, quite naturally, brings together Lt. Horatio Caine and his team and Detective Mac Taylor (of CSI: NY) and his team, a spree that eventually mounts to 13 bodies in the two episodes."

Anthony Zuiker described the event as "virtually a movie", while CSI: Miami's show-runner Ann Donahue stated that, despite a crossover being planned earlier, she had "held off on this because [she] wanted to wait until 'New York' had distinguished itself" from its predecessors. Zuiker noted that as well as being a "tremendous treat for viewers", the crossover would provide "a chance to sample other CSI shows and casts and mysteries on other nights", particularly due to the "complete visual makeover" undertaken during CSI: NY's second season, "in terms of the lighting style, the colors, and the new labs." He also described the crossover as " the event that the franchise needed at this point, not only for CSI: NY, but [for] the viewers. And it's, I feel, some of our best work if not the best."

=== Crossover with CSI: Crime Scene Investigation ===
In 2005, prior to the airing of "Felony Flight", Ann Donahue stated that "you never know" when a three-way crossover will be produced, with Zuiker stating that "the beauty of this franchise is it's very interchangeable in terms of how crossover combinations will work". In 2009, CBS commissioned a three-part crossover starring CSI: Crime Scene Investigation star Laurence Fishburne, an event that EW dubbed the "Great CSI Crossover Experiment That William Petersen Never Would Have Agreed To". The Miami segment of the crossover, titled "Bone Voyage", aired on November 9, 2009.

== Broadcast ==
The series was originally broadcast on CBS in the United States, airing on Mondays at 10/9 for the first eight seasons, then moving to Sundays at 10/9C for its final two seasons. CBS frequently repeats CSI: Miami on weekends during the Crimetime Saturday slot, while CBS also owns syndication rights to the series, with CBS Entertainment President Nina Tassler stating that she intends to air CSI: Miami "in syndication for years to come".

Similarly, CSI: Miami has been syndicated on A&E Network since 2005, on late Sunday nights/Early Monday mornings at 11:00 PM. While on December 2, 2011, AMC acquired syndication rights of the series, and began airing the episodes on January 2, 2012. The show airs regularly at 5/4C on weekdays. In August 2012 WE tv started airing reruns of the show. Both A&E and Spike TV share the return rights to the crossover episodes (with CSI: NY), Felony Flight and Manhattan Manhunt. As of January 2026, The Show is currently airing on Charge!.

In Australia Nine Network aired new episodes of CSI: Miami, and repeats were shown on satellite channel TVH!TS (formerly TV1).

== Reception ==
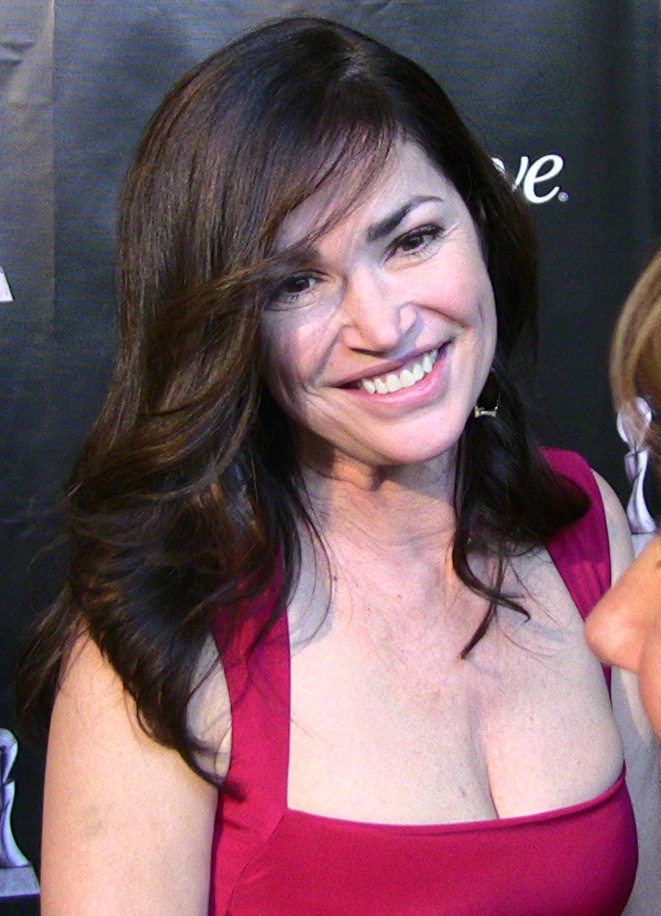
Kim Delaney was praised for her "edgy" performance as Lieutenant Megan Donner. Despite this, she only appeared in the first half of the show's first season

The reviews for CSI: Miami received were generally positive, with the website Metacritic giving the series a weighted average score of 63 out of 100 based on 30 reviews, indicating "generally favorable" reviews. In 2002, Ann Hodges of The Houston Chronicle stated that "the clone could turn out to be better than the original", while Aaron Barnhart of The Kansas City Star commented that CSI: Miami "just feels like the show CSI should have been all along". Tim Goodman noted that "There probably isn't a bigger slam-dunk victor on the fall schedule than CSI: Miami," describing it as "on its own, a very fine show".

Following the series finale, Nina Tassler credited CSI: Miami with being a "key player in CBS's rise to the top", stating that the series "leaves an amazing television legacy—a signature look and style [and] global popularity". CBS News described CSI: Miami as "one of TV's biggest hits".

Brendan Bernhard of The New York Sun stated that, with repeat viewing,

"Mr. Caruso's mannerisms become less annoying than soothing as they melt into all those hypnotic patterns of shadow and light, and your critical faculties melt along with them. It's like a real estate show with characters and a plot, and it can hook you. The pristine settings, the stunning aerial views of harbors and yachts, the gorgeous homes and burnished floors, and then . . . a flash of anger, a gush of blood. At which point, enter Miami-Dade Head Investigator, Lieutenant Horatio Caine, world's most popular cop. And not by chance, an American".

Tim Goodman stated that "Caruso reminds everyone why he's good on the small screen, as the confident, dispassionate and slightly cynical Horatio." Nina Tassler later credited Caruso for leading a talented cast for "ten outstanding seasons". Similarly, Goodman described Delaney's portrayal of Megan Donner as "edgy enough to keep up with [Caruso]" and the Chicago Tribune credits Delaney with leading a "strong cast" and a "slickly produced series". SF Gate commented that she should be credited for "saving [a fledgling] new series".

In 2006, BBC News published an article stating that CSI: Miami was the world's most popular television series. The article cites a study, conducted by Informa and published by Radio Times magazine, that collected television viewing data in 20 countries, revealing that CSI: Miami was featured in more top-10 viewing charts than any other series. Adam Thomas, the media research manager responsible for the study, explained:

"The objective of our research was to find the most consistently successful programme worldwide in terms of attracting viewers. We were not therefore concerned with shows that performed extremely well in a relatively small number of markets. CSI: Miami was therefore named the most popular programme because it featured in more countries' top ten rankings for 2005 than any other".

Nearly all episodes of the series had a cold open which ended with Caruso putting on sunglasses and making a quip or pun related to the newfound crime, before the show cut to the scream of "Yeah!" in "Won't Be Fooled Again" for the opening credits. This imagery became a common meme on the Internet, typically in response to a similar pun made on user forums.

== Accolades ==
=== Awards ===
ALMA Awards
- 2011: Outstanding Actor in a Drama Series: Adam Rodriguez

ASCAP Award

- 2005-06, 09: Top TV Series Score – Jeff Cardoni

ASC Awards

- 2003: Outstanding Achievement in Cinematography (Pilot) – "Cross Jurisdictions"

BMI Film & TV Awards

- 2003-05, 08-09: TV Music Award - Pete Townshend

Primetime Emmy Awards

- 2003: Outstanding Cinematography – "A Simple Man"
- 2007: Outstanding Stunt Co-Ordination – "Rush"

California On Location

- 2007: Assistant Location Manager of the Year – Adam Robinson

Image Awards

- 2005: Outstanding Supporting Actress in a Drama – Khandi Alexander

Imagen Foundation Awards

- 2011: Best Supporting Actress on Television – Eva LaRue
- 2012: Best Supporting Actress on Television – Eva LaRue

Motion Picture Sound Editors

- 2005: Best Sound Editing in Long Form – Effects & Foley – "Crime Wave"
- 2007: Best Sound Editing in Short Form – Music – "Rio"
- 2009: Best Sound Editing in Short Form – Music – "Tipping Point"

People's Choice Awards

- 2003: Favorite New TV Dramatic Series

Teen Choice Awards

- 2012: Choice TV Actor – Adam Rodriguez
- 2012: Choice TV Series – Action

=== Nominations ===
ALMA Awards
- 2008-09: Outstanding Actor in a Drama Series – Adam Rodriguez"2009 ALMA nominations" (PDF). ALMA.
- 2009, 11: Outstanding Actress in a Drama Series – Eva LaRue
- 2011: Favorite TV Series

ASC Awards

- 2008: Outstanding Achievement in Cinematography – "Darkroom"
- 2009: Outstanding Achievement in Cinematography – "Inside Out"

Crime Thriller Award

- 2008: Best International TV Drama

Edgar Award

- 2009: Best TV Episode Teleplay – "You May Now Kill The Bride"

Primetime Emmy Awards

- 2005: Outstanding Sound Editing – "Lost Son"
- 2007: Outstanding Sound Editing – "No Man's Land"
- 2012: Outstanding Sound Editing – "Blown Away"

Golden Camera Awards

- 2009: Best US Television Series

Golden Reel Sound Editors Guild Awards

- 2004: Best Sound Editing – Episodic Television

Imagen Awards

- 2004: Outstanding Drama Series
- 2005: Outstanding Supporting Actress in a Drama – Khandi Alexander
- 2006: Outstanding Drama Series
- 2006: Outstanding Supporting Actress in a Drama – Khandi Alexander
- 2007: Outstanding Supporting Actress in a Drama – Khandi Alexander

Imagen Foundation Awards

- 2005: Best Supporting Actor in a Drama – Adam Rodriguez
- 2006: Best Supporting Actress in a Drama – Eva LaRue
- 2007: Best Supporting Actress in a Drama – Eva LaRue
- 2009: Best Supporting Actress in a Drama – Eva LaRue

Motion Picture Sound Editors

- 2004: Best Sound Editing in Short Form – Effects & Foley – "Grand Prix"
- 2005: Best Sound Editing in Short Form – Effects & Foley – "Lost Son"
- 2006: Best Sound Editing in Short Form – Dialog & ADR – "Three-Way"
- 2006: Best Sound Editing in Short Form – Effects & Foley – "Urban Hellraisers"
- 2007: Best Sound Editing in Short Form – Effects & Foley – "Come As You Are"
- 2010: Best Sound Editing in Short Form – Effects & Foley – "Point of Impact
- 2010: Best Sound Editing in Short Form – Dialog & ADR – "Point of Impact"
- 2011: Best Sound Editing in Short Form – Music – "L.A."
- 2012: Best Sound Editing in Short Form – Music – "Crowned"
- 2013: Best Sound Editing in Long Form

Prism Award

- 2010: Best Depiction of Mental Health in a Drama Series – "Head Case"

Young Artist Awards

- 2003: Guest Star – Male – Raja Fenske
- 2003: Guest Star – Male – Seth Adkins
- 2004: Guest Star – Female – Sara Paxton
- 2005: Guest Star – Male – Alex Black
- 2008: Guest Star – Female – Cole Petersen
- 2010: Guest Star – 13 and Under – Scotty Noyd, Jr.
- 2011: Guest Star – 11–13 – Colin Ford
- 2012: Guest Star – 11–13 – Maxim Knight
- 2012: Guest Star – 17–21 – Erin Sanders
- 2012: Guest Star – 10 and Under – Danielle Parker

== Adaptations and spin-offs ==
Sunil Nayar, an executive producer of CSI: Miami has stated that "navigating a show like CSI: Miami is not unlike commanding a ship in a fleet. Its obligation to the bigger CSI franchise is almost like the obligation one feels towards one's siblings". Like CSI: Crime Scene Investigation, CSI: Miami has spawned a series of comic books, novels, and video games based on the show.

CSI has also been released as a series of mobile games. In 2007, CBS teamed up with game developer Gameloft to bring CSI to mobile phones. The first of the series to be published was CSI: Miami. The game features actual cast members such as Caine, Woods and Duquesne who are trying to solve a murder in South Beach with the player's assistance. The game is also available for download on various iPod devices.

=== CSI: NY ===
In December 2003, Entertainment Weekly reported that "there are rumblings that co-creator Anthony Zuiker and company are planning a third franchise, to be set in New York City". In 2004, CBS commissioned the New York-set CSI series, starring Gary Sinise as a detective named Mac Taylor. Mac, a veteran officer "who lost his wife during the terror attacks on September 11", was expected to "make a guest appearance on CSI: Miami" in May 2004.

On March 23, 2004, Melina Kanakaredes was cast as Stella, "a crime scene unit detective". Kanakaredes was cast following her signing a talent deal with CBS in August 2003. The Futon Critic noted that Kanakaredes "was initially set up as the lead of the drama project I.C.E., about the Bureau of Immigration and Customs Enforcement, a wing of the Dept. of Homeland Security. With I.C.E.'s development stalled, Kanakaredes was free to join NY". Vanessa Ferlito and Carmine Giovinazzo were also cast in lead roles. The pilot episode for CSI: NY, titled "MIA/NYC NonStop" aired on May 17, 2004, and also featured Hill Harper.

On the aesthetic difference between CSI: Miami and CSI: NY, senior writer Andrew Lipsitz stated that "all cities are fantasies, made up of the dreams of individual inhabitants. New York is its own fantasy—it's the great fantasy of anyone who came here from another country. It may or may not be more real, it may or may not be baked in the sun, but it's an amalgam of everyone's dreams."

Anthony Zuiker also stated that, while "Miami feature[s] self-contained episodes that favor solving crimes over exploring characters' lives... NY [will] be more character-driven". USA Today later observed that "structurally, the CSIs bear striking similarities. Each unit, which uses advanced forensic techniques to solve crimes, is headed by a veteran male, joined by a leading female", yet "climate offers variation. NY offers the prospect of frozen corpses."
