= Atsuko Yuya =

Japanese actress and voice actress (born 1968)

- 湯屋 敦子
- Born: September 1, 1968 (age 58); Nagasaki, Japan
- Occupations: Actress; voice actress
- Years active: 1993–present
- Agent: Gekidan Subaru
- Height: 170 cm (5 ft 7 in)

Atsuko Yuya (湯屋 敦子, Yuya Atsuko; born September 1, 1968) is a Japanese actress and voice actress who works for Gekidan Subaru. Yuya is originally from Nagasaki. She voices Jill Valentine in the Resident Evil series and officer Miwako Sato in the long-running anime series Case Closed. She is the official Japanese voice dub-over artist for actresses Angelina Jolie and Natasha Henstridge.

== Filmography ==
=== Anime ===
List of voice performances in anime
Year	Title	Role	Notes	Source
1996	The Story of Cinderella	Misha, Queen ミーシャ / 王妃		
1996	B't X	Aramis		
1997	The Kindaichi Case Files	Morning Momoko / Yang Li 轟美和子 / 楊麗俐		
1997	Mach GoGoGo	Mary Stuart (Ep. 32)		
1997–present	Case Closed/Detective Conan	Tomomi Sakaguchi (Eps. 63), Miwako Sato		
1999	Shukan Storyland ja:週刊ストーリーランド	Yumiko Hirose 広瀬由美子		
2001	Banner of the Stars II	Fazun		
2001	Hikaru no Go	Chieko Sakurano		
2003	Wolf's Rain	Cole		
2003	Beast Fighter - The Apocalypse	Shizue Kuruma "Shinichi's Mother"		
2003	Detective School Q	Miri Murasaki		
2004	Kita e	Yuki		
2004	Daphne in the Brilliant Blue	Prime minister		
2004	Midori Days	Rin Sawamura		
2004	Kurau Phantom Memory	Mother		
2004	Maria-sama ga Miteru: Spring	Eiko Hoshina		
2004	Zoids: Fuzors	Sandra		
2004	Yakitate!! Japan	Yukino Azusagawa		
2005	Gallery Fake	Assarama アッサラマ		
2005	Trinity Blood	Mother Laura ローウ司祭		
2005	Angel Heart	Haruka Kōnomi		
2006	Ergo Proxy	Quinn		
2006	Witchblade	Kyoko Sasaki		
2006	Coyote Ragtime Show	Angelica Burns		
2006	Night Head Genesis	Yamashita 山下		
2006	Pumpkin Scissors	Muzé Kauplan		
2006	009-1	Kay ケイ		
2006	Katekyo Hitman Reborn	Giggionero's Boss, Aria ジッリョネロのボス / アリア		
2007	Nodame Cantabile	Yoko Noda 野田陽子		
2007	Kishin Taisen Gigantic Formula	Isabel イザベル		
2007	Dennou Coil	Canna's mother		
2008	Dazzle	Romario's mother		
2009	Mainichi Kaasan	Chinatsu-chan's Mom / Taka-kun's Mom 千夏ちゃんのママ / タカくんのママ		
2010	Nodame Cantabile Finale	Yoko Noda 野田洋子		
2010	Katanagatari	Meisai Tsuruga		
2010	HeartCatch PreCure!	Tsubaki Myoudouin		
2010	Big Windup! Summer Tournament Edition	Misaki Abe 阿部美佐枝		
2011	Hanasaku Iroha	Kojo Wajima 輪島君子		
2011	Bleach	Jackie Tristan		
2013	DokiDoki! PreCure	Ryoko Hishikawa		
2013–2014	Silver Spoon	Fuji-sensei	2 seasons	
2014	Barakamon	Cat wife's wife 猫屋敷の奥さん		
2014	Your Lie in April	Samurai's mother 武士の母		
2015	Rin-ne	Soul diet 魂食王		
2016	Natsume's Book of Friends	The girl's mother 少女の母		
2019	Fruits Basket	Kyo's Mother		
2025	Lazarus	Carla		
2025	New Panty & Stocking with Garterbelt	Silk		
2026	Daemons of the Shadow Realm	Iori Shingo		

=== Film ===
List of voice performances in film
Year	Title	Role	Notes	Source
2000	Case Closed: Captured in Her Eyes	Miwako Sato		
2003	Detective Conan: Crossroad in the Ancient Capital	Miwako Sato		
2005	Detective Conan: Strategy Above the Depths	Miwako Sato		
2006	Origin: Spirits of the Past	Jessica		
2006	Detective Conan: The Private Eyes' Requiem	Miwako Sato		
2007	Detective Conan: Jolly Roger in the Deep Azure	Miwako Sato		
2008	Detective Conan: Full Score of Fear	Miwako Sato		
2009	Detective Conan: The Raven Chaser	Miwako Sato		
2010	Detective Conan: The Lost Ship in the Sky	Miwako Sato		
2011	Detective Conan: Quarter of Silence	Miwako Sato		
2011	Friends - Nagi of Mononoke Island friends -フレンズ- もののけ島のナキ	Akeno 明野		
2012	Detective Conan: The Eleventh Striker	Miwako Sato		
2013	Detective Conan: Private Eye in the Distant Sea	Miwako Sato		
2013	DokiDoki! Precure the Movie: Mana's Getting Married!!? The Dress of Hope Tied to the Future	Ryoko Hishikawa		
2013	Lupin the 3rd vs. Detective Conan: The Movie	Miwako Sato		
2014	Detective Conan: Dimensional Sniper	Miwako Sato		

=== Video games ===
List of voice performances in video games
Year	Title	Role	Notes	Source
1998	Panzer Dragoon Saga	Rug ラグ	SS	
2000	Meitantei Conan: 3 Nin no Meisuiri	Miwako Sato	PlayStation	
2002	Meitantei Conan: Saikou no Aibou	Miwako Sato, Keeper	PlayStation	
2005	Perfect Dark Zero	Chandra Sekhar	Xbox 360	
2007	Nodame Cantabile	Yoko Noda 野田洋子	PS1/PS2	
2009	Gears of War 2	Anya Stroud	Xbox 360	
2011	Marvel vs. Capcom 3: Fate of Two Worlds	Jill Valentine	Also Ultimate	
2012	Resident Evil: Revelations	Jill Valentine		
2012	Project X Zone	Jill Valentine	3DS	
2013	Meitantei Conan: Marionetto Kōkyōkyoku (Shinfonī)	Miwako Sato	Nintendo 3DS	
2014	Meitantei Conan: Fantomu Kyōshikyoku (Rapusodī)	Miwako Sato	Nintendo 3DS	
2014	Resident Evil HD Remaster	Jill Valentine		
2015	Project X Zone 2	Jill Valentine	3DS	
2019	Teppen	Jill Valentine		
2020	Resident Evil 3	Jill Valentine		
	Perfect Dark	Chandra Sekhar	Xbox 360	

=== Drama CD ===
List of voice performances in audio recordings
Year	Title	Role	Notes	Source
	Sakura Taisen	Various characters	Drama CD	

=== Tokusatsu ===
List of voice performances in anime
Year	Title	Role	Notes	Source
2010	Samurai Sentai Shinkenger	Ayakashi Yomotsugari ヨモツガリ	Ep. 44	

=== Dubbing ===
List of voice performances in other dubbing (Live-action)
Title	Role	Voice dub for	Notes	Source
Girl, Interrupted	Lisa Rowe	Angelina Jolie		
The Bone Collector	Police Officer Amelia Donaghy	Angelina Jolie		
Lara Croft: Tomb Raider	Lara Croft	Angelina Jolie		
Lara Croft: Tomb Raider – The Cradle of Life	Lara Croft	Angelina Jolie		
Mr. & Mrs. Smith	Jane Smith	Angelina Jolie		
The Good Shepherd	Margaret "Clover" Russell Wilson	Angelina Jolie		
Wanted	Fox	Angelina Jolie		
Changeling	Christine Collins	Angelina Jolie		
The Tourist	Elise Clifton-Ward	Angelina Jolie		
Salt	Evelyn Salt	Angelina Jolie		
By the Sea	Vanessa	Angelina Jolie		
Species	Sil	Natasha Henstridge		
Maximum Risk	Alex Minetti	Natasha Henstridge		
Species II	Eve	Natasha Henstridge		
Bounce	Mimi Prager	Natasha Henstridge		
Ghosts of Mars	Lieutenant Melanie Ballard	Natasha Henstridge		
Species III	Eve	Natasha Henstridge		
Michel Vaillant	Julie Wood	Diane Kruger		
National Treasure	Dr. Abigail Chase	Diane Kruger		
National Treasure: Book of Secrets	Dr. Abigail Chase	Diane Kruger		
The Hunting Party	Mirjana	Diane Kruger		
The Bridge	Sonya Cross	Diane Kruger		
The 355	Marie Schmidt	Diane Kruger		
30 Days of Night	Stella Oleson	Melissa George		
300	Queen Gorgo	Lena Headey		
300: Rise of an Empire	Queen Gorgo	Lena Headey		
88 Minutes	Kim Cummings	Alicia Witt		
Aliens vs. Predator: Requiem	Kelly O'Brien	Reiko Aylesworth		
The Amityville Horror	Kathy Lutz	Melissa George		
Austenland	Jane Hayes	Keri Russell		
Autumn in My Heart	Yoon/Choi Eun-suh	Song Hye-kyo		
Big Night	Phyllis	Minnie Driver		
Blue Thunder	Kate	Candy Clark		
The Bourne Identity	Marie Kreutz	Franka Potente		
The Bourne Supremacy	Marie Kreutz	Franka Potente		
Bulworth	Nina	Halle Berry		
Chronicles of the Ghostly Tribe	Yang Ping / Shirley Yang	Yao Chen		
Cliffhanger	Sarah	Michelle Joyner	1997 NTV edition	
The Conjuring 2	Peggy Hodgson	Frances O'Connor		
The Constant Gardener	Tessa Abbott-Quayle	Rachel Weisz		
Cookie's Fortune	Emma Duvall	Liv Tyler		
Daddy Day Care	Kimberly Hinton	Regina King		
The Deaths of Ian Stone	Medea	Jaime Murray		
Disobedience	Ronit Krushka	Rachel Weisz		
Doomsday	Major Eden Sinclair	Rhona Mitra		
Dragon	Yu	Tang Wei		
The Dukes of Hazzard	Daisy Duke	Jessica Simpson		
Eraser	Lee Cullen	Vanessa Williams		
Firestorm	Law Yin-bing	Yao Chen		
Frost/Nixon	Caroline Cushing	Rebecca Hall		
Get Shorty	Karen Flores	Rene Russo		
Godsend	Jessie Duncan	Rebecca Romijn		
Hope Springs	Karen	Elisabeth Shue		
Infernal Affairs	Mary	Sammi Cheng		
The Jackal	Isabella Celia Zancona	Mathilda May		
Keeping Up with the Joneses	Natalie Jones	Gal Gadot		
Kit Kittredge: An American Girl	Margaret Kittredge	Julia Ormond		
Lucky Number Slevin	Lindsey	Lucy Liu		
Marvel Zombies	Melina Vostokoff	Kari Wahlgren		
Mercenary for Justice	Maxine Barnol	Jacqueline Lord		
Monster Hunt	Female Head Chef	Yao Chen		
The Natural	Memo Paris	Kim Basinger		
Nick of Time	Krista Brooks	Gloria Reuben		
The Ninth Gate	The Girl	Emmanuelle Seigner		
Octopus	Dr. Lisa Finch	Carolyn Lowery		
Olympus Has Fallen	Leah Banning	Radha Mitchell		
Out of Reach	Kasia Lato	Agnieszka Wagner		
Perfect Stranger	Josie	Daniella van Graas		
Pollock	Lee Krasner	Marcia Gay Harden		
Plunkett & Macleane	Lady Rebecca Gibson	Liv Tyler		
Powder	Lindsey Kelloway	Missy Crider		
Requiem for a Dream	Marion Silver	Jennifer Connelly		
Resident Evil: Apocalypse	Jill Valentine	Sienna Guillory		
Resident Evil: Retribution	Jill Valentine	Sienna Guillory		
Rush Hour 2	Agent Isabella Molina	Roselyn Sánchez		
Serenity	Zoe Washburne	Gina Torres		
Shooter	Sarah Fenn	Kate Mara		
Shopgirl	Mirabelle Buttersfield	Claire Danes		
Species III	Sara	Sunny Mabrey		
The Tailor of Panama	Marta	Leonor Varela		
Tokyo Raiders	Saori	Cecilia Cheung		
Top Gun	Charlotte "Charlie" Blackwood	Kelly McGillis	2005 DVD edition	
The X-Files: I Want to Believe	Dakota Whitney	Amanda Peet		
The Yards	Erica Soltz	Charlize Theron		
Youth	Lena Ballinger	Rachel Weisz		

List of voice performances in overseas dubs (Animation)
Year	Title	Role	Notes	Source
2003	The Matrix Revolutions	No name 役名なし		
2012	Frankenweenie	Susan Frankenstein		
2023	Resident Evil: Death Island	Jill Valentine		
