= Species (franchise) =

Science-fiction horror film series

- Official franchise logo
- Created by: Dennis Feldman
- Original work: Species (1995)
- Owner: Amazon MGM Studios
- Years: 1995–2007

Films and television
- Films: Species (1995); Species II (1998)
- Television films: Species III (2004); Species – The Awakening (2007)

Audio
- Soundtracks: List of soundtracks

Species is a science fiction action horror media franchise created by Dennis Feldman consisting of four related films.

== Films ==
Film	U.S. release date	Director(s)	Screenwriter(s)	Producer(s)
Species	July 7, 1995	Roger Donaldson	Dennis Feldman	Frank Mancuso Jr. Dennis Feldman
Species II	April 10, 1998	Peter Medak	Chris Brancato	Frank Mancuso Jr.
Species III	November 27, 2004	Brad Turner	Ben Ripley	David Dwiggins
Species – The Awakening	September 29, 2007	Nick Lyon	Ben Ripley	Frank Mancuso Jr. Lorenzo O'Brien

=== Species (1995) ===
A group of scientists try to track down and trap a killer alien seductress before she successfully mates with a human.

=== Species II (1998) ===
An astronaut gets infected with alien DNA during the first mission on Mars and runs amok on earth. Preston and Laura team up with a peaceful, genetically re-engineered Sil to track the monster down.

=== Species III (2004) ===
As her species decays succumbing to infections and illnesses, an alien seductress immunologically stronger becomes the only hope for them to live on.

=== Species – The Awakening (2007) ===
When she reaches the end of her lifespan, a scientist rushes to Mexico, in order to save the half-breed alien seductress he raised as his docile niece, but soon awakens the deadly, sexual predator inside her.

== Cast and crew ==
=== Cast ===
Key
List indicators

This section includes characters who will appear or have appeared in the franchise.

- An empty grey cell indicates the character was not in the film, or that the character's official presence has not yet been confirmed.
- ^{A} indicates an appearance through archival footage or audio.
- ^{C} indicates a cameo role.
- ^{U} indicates an uncredited appearance.
- ^{V} indicates a voice-only role.
- ^{Y} indicates a younger version of the character.

Characters	Films			
Characters	Species	Species II	Species III	Species – The Awakening
Characters	1995	1998	2004	2007
Creatures
Sil	Natasha Henstridge Michelle Williams^{Y} Dana Hee^{Y} Frank Welker^{V}	Mentioned	Natasha Henstridge^{A}	
Eve		Natasha Henstridge Monica Staggs	Natasha Henstridge	
Patrick Ross		Justin Lazard Vincent Hammond		
Portus		Nicholas Vota^{Y}	Joel Stoffer Christopher R. Gillum^{Y}	
Sara			Sunny Mabrey Savanna Fields ^{Y}	
Amelia			Amelia Cooke	
Miranda Hollander				Helena Mattsson
Azura				Marlene Favela
Humans
Preston "Press" Lennox	Michael Madsen	Michael Madsen		
Dr. Laura Baker	Marg Helgenberger	Marg Helgenberger		
Xavier Fitch	Ben Kingsley		Mentioned	
Dr. Stephen Arden	Alfred Molina			
Dan Smithson	Forest Whitaker			
John Carey	Whip Hubley			
U.S. Senator Judson Ross		James Cromwell		
Dennis Gamble		Mykelti Williamson		
Col. Carter Burgess Jr.		George Dzundza		
Dean			Robin Dunne	
Dr. Bruce Abbot			Robert Knepper	
Hastings			John Paul Pitoc	
Tom Hollander				Ben Cross
Forbes Maguire				Dominic Keating

=== Additional crew and production details ===
Film	Crew/detail					
Film	Composer	Cinematographer	Editor	Production companies	Distribution companies	Running time
Species	Christopher Young	Andrzej Bartkowiak	Conrad Buff	Frank Mancuso Productions	Metro-Goldwyn-Mayer	108 minutes
Species II	Edward Shearmur	Matthew F. Leonetti	Richard Nord	FGM Entertainment	Metro-Goldwyn-Mayer	93 minutes
Species III	Elia Cmiral	James Coblentz	Christian Sebaldt	MGM Television FGM Entertainment	Syfy	112 minutes
Species – The Awakening	Kevin Haskins Paul Cristo	Jaime Reynoso	Robert Komatsu	MGM Television 360 Pictures	Syfy	98 minutes

== Reception ==
=== Box office performance ===
Film	Year	North America	Other territories	Worldwide	Budget	Ref.
Species	1995	$60,074,103	$53,300,000	$113,374,103	$35 million	
Species II	1998	$19,217,565	$7,600,000	$26,817,565	$35 million	
Total		$79,291,668	$60,900,000	$140,191,668	$70 million	

=== Critical and public response ===
Film	Rotten Tomatoes	Metacritic	CinemaScore
Species	42% (73 reviews)	49 (25 reviews)	B-
Species II	9% (34 reviews)	19 (13 reviews)	C
Species III	17% (6 reviews)	—N/a	—N/a
Species – The Awakening	N/A (2 reviews)	—N/a	—N/a

== Music ==
Soundtracks to Species films
Title	U.S. release date	Length	Composed by	Label
Species (Original Motion Picture Soundtrack)	October 6, 2008	—N/a	Christopher Young	Intrada
Species II (Original MGM Motion Picture Soundtrack)	April 14, 1998	—N/a	Edward Shearmur	TVT
