= Species – The Awakening =

Species: The Awakening
- Official DVD cover
- Based on: Characters by Dennis Feldman
- Written by: Ben Ripley
- Directed by: Nick Lyon
- Starring: Ben Cross; Helena Mattsson; Dominic Keating; Marlene Favela
- Music by: Kevin Haskins; Paul Cristo
- Country of origin: United States
- Original language: English

Production
- Executive producer: Johnny O. Lopez
- Producers: Frank Mancuso Jr.; Lorenzo O'Brien
- Cinematography: Jaime Reynoso
- Editor: Robert Komatsu
- Running time: 98 minutes
- Production companies: MGM Television; 360 Pictures

Original release
- Network: Syfy
- Release: September 29, 2007

Related
- Species III (2004)

Species – The Awakening is a 2007 American science fiction action thriller television film, and the fourth and final installment of the Species franchise. The film was directed by Nick Lyon and stars Ben Cross, Helena Mattsson, Dominic Keating and Marlene Favela. It is a standalone sequel to Species III (2004) and the only film of the Species franchise that does not involve Natasha Henstridge at all. The film premiered on the American broadcast, the Sci Fi Channel on September 29, 2007 and was released on DVD on October 2.

== Plot ==
Miranda Hollander is a college professor who lives with her "uncle", Tom Hollander, who works in a museum. Miranda can read books by touch, without needing to open them. Miranda believes that her parents were killed in an accident while she was a baby. After her birthday, Miranda passes out and is sent to a local hospital. Tom is notified by the police. At the hospital, Miranda transforms into an alien form and kills several people. When Tom arrives the following morning, he finds bodies everywhere. Tom locates Miranda, injects her with human hormones and drives her to Mexico. On the way, Miranda wakes up, asking for the cause of her illness. Tom tells Miranda that she is the result of an experiment that combined human and alien DNA, conducted with his friend Forbes McGuire while they were in college. Tom has been injecting her with human hormones since her childhood to suppress her alien DNA. Her parents were a fiction created by Tom to help build Miranda's normal life. Tom and Forbes parted ways because of differences of opinion over their creation.

In Mexico, Tom and Miranda locate Forbes, who lives with his recent experiment Azura, another human and alien DNA hybrid who serves as his assistant and lover. Forbes supports his experiment by creating half-alien facsimiles of dead pets and relatives for paying clients. Forbes checks Miranda's condition, and finds out that she will die in days; her changes to alien form are her body's way of fighting back, as her human form has a weaker immune system. The only cure is to inject fresh human DNA into Miranda. Miranda will not allow that to happen, when she realizes it will result in a human sacrifice. Miranda becomes unconscious and Tom goes searching for a "donor", and is mugged. Azura incapacitates the mugger. Collette and the two bring her back to Forbes' lab, where they succeed in extending Miranda's life.

But Miranda starts acting odd, joking about having sex with Azura. Tom checks her blood as she invites him to get drunk and have sex in their hotel room; he tells her to rest, believing that she is delirious from the procedure. She leaves in a huff. Tom finds out Forbes did a sloppy job; Miranda's hormones are unstable, causing her alien side to become increasingly dominant. Driven by her alien sex drive, Miranda seduces the innkeeper Calderon, another hybrid; but she kills him mid-process upon finding he is sterile. She goes to a bar for potential mates, stealing a provocative red dress from a bar singer.

Tom wishes to sedate Miranda, so that they can fix the imbalance in her DNA. Forbes gives him a near-lethal dose to use, but warns that she is "100% pure creature". Investigating a church, Tom is attacked by Azura; she is angry that his arrival changed things. He knocks her out by dropping a large cross on her, leaving Azura to heal and regain consciousness. Forbes tracks Miranda to an abandoned warehouse, where she strips naked; Miranda reveals that Forbes has wanted to have sex with her since they met. Forbes gives into his lust, allowing Miranda to copulate with him. Once finished, Miranda changes into alien form and sends her tongue down Forbes' throat, suffocating him. Tom finds them later.

Tom takes Miranda back to Forbes' house, where he discovers via X-ray that a hybrid child is rapidly growing in her womb. Miranda says that her humanity is dying and that she does not want to be pure alien. Azura returns in alien form; Tom is forced to fight her. When Azura has Tom cornered, Miranda attacks and apparently kills Azura, but Azura rises again and fatally impales Miranda, before Tom kills Azura with a shotgun. In human form, Miranda thanks Tom for giving her life before dying. A saddened Tom turns on all the gas burners and tanks in Forbes' house, and leaves. As he walks away, the house explodes.

== Cast ==
- Ben Cross as Tom Hollander
- Helena Mattsson as Miranda Hollander
- Dominic Keating as Forbes Maguire
- Marlene Favela as Azura
- Meagen Fay as Celeste
- Roger Cudney as Leland Fisk
- Marco Bacuzzi as Rinaldo
- Edy Arellano as Calderon
- Cynthia Francesconi as Collette
- Mauricio Martinez as Dalton

== Production ==
=== Development ===
In 2006, Metro-Goldwyn-Mayer began production of another sequel to Species. An MGM/360 production, filming commenced in October, with Frank Mancuso Jr. returning as producer.

The producers wanted to go back to H. R. Giger's designs of the alien creature due to popularity with fans and the absence of these designs in the last installment Species III. The original look is apparent but with different color variations and new spikes on the aliens' wrists of the nemesis. It is also the first in the series that a half-human, half-alien character does not change fully into the alien creature but has prosthetic eyebrows, veins and contacts for a long period of time in more than one scene.

=== Title ===
The film's title underwent several changes, starting as Species IV, Species: Quattro and finally Species – The Awakening. During pre-production the film was referred to as Species IV on movie websites. When an online trailer was released the film was called Species: Quattro. Eventually Nick Lyon, the director of the film, gave the film's final name on his official website. Like the previous films, the original film's logo is used for the main title.

== Reception ==
Den of Geek gave the film a positive review, saying it exceeded his expectations for a straight-to-DVD release.
