= Frank Mancuso Sr. =

American film studio executive (1933–2026)

- Born: Frank George Mancuso; July 25, 1933; Buffalo, New York, U.S.
- Died: October 1, 2026 (aged 93); Los Angeles, California, U.S.
- Occupation: Studio executive
- Known for: Chairman and CEO of Paramount Pictures; Chairman and CEO of Metro-Goldwyn-Mayer
- Spouse: Fay Mancuso (m. 1957)
- Children: 2, including Frank Mancuso Jr.

Frank George Mancuso Sr. (July 25, 1933 – October 1, 2026) was an American film studio executive. He was the chairman and CEO of Paramount Pictures between 1984 and 1991, and Metro-Goldwyn-Mayer between 1993 and 1999, when he retired.

== Early life and career ==
Frank George Mancuso was born in Buffalo, New York, on July 25, 1933. He started as an usher in a theater in Buffalo and eventually ran the programming for the company's 50 theatres.

He joined Paramount Pictures in 1962, booking films from their Buffalo office. He worked his way up through their sales division before becoming vice-president of domestic distribution in March 1977. He became senior vice-president in August 1978. In April 1979, he was promoted to executive vice-president for distribution and marketing, taking over marketing responsibilities. In August 1980, he became president of Paramount's new Distribution division, which also became responsible for acquiring films for distribution.

In 1983, Mancuso was promoted to president of Paramount's motion picture division and in September 1984 he was chosen instead of COO Michael Eisner to take over from the departing Barry Diller as chairman and chief executive officer. He appointed Ned Tanen to head the motion picture division. After falling from first place in 1984 to fourth in 1985, Paramount became the number one studio again in 1986 and 1987 with hits including Top Gun, Crocodile Dundee (the top two grossing films of 1986), Star Trek IV: The Voyage Home, Beverly Hills Cop II, The Untouchables and Fatal Attraction.

Mancuso became a Governor of the Academy of Motion Picture Arts and Sciences in 1986, and in 1992, he became its secretary.

In March 1991, Mancuso left Paramount soon after Stanley Jaffe had joined and filed a $45 million lawsuit for breach of contract.

In 1993, Mancuso became chairman and CEO of Metro-Goldwyn-Mayer until his retirement in 1999. He was the chairman of the Motion Picture and Television Fund Corporate Board of Directors.

== Personal life and death ==
Mancuso married his wife, Fay, in 1957. They had two children: producer Frank Mancuso Jr., and Maria Mancuso Gersh.

Mancuso died from lung cancer at his home in Los Angeles, on October 1, 2026, at the age of 93.

== Awards and recognition ==
In 2010, Mancuso received a star on the Italian Walk of Fame in Toronto, Ontario, Canada.

In 2011, Mancuso was awarded the National Italian American Foundation (NIAF) Jack Valenti Institute Award.

== Filmography ==
=== Film ===
Year	Film	Credit	Notes
1998	The Man in the Iron Mask	Executive producer	Uncredited
