= Alien Agent =

- Directed by: Jesse V. Johnson
- Written by: Vlady Pildysh
- Produced by: Martin J. Barab
- Starring: Mark Dacascos; Billy Zane; Amelia Cooke
- Cinematography: C. Kim Miles
- Edited by: Asim Nuraney; Gordon Williams
- Music by: Michael Richard Plowman
- Distributed by: Alien Films
- Release date: 2007
- Running time: 95 minutes
- Countries: Canada; United States
- Language: English
- Budget: CAD 4,000,000 (estimated)

Alien Agent is a 2007 Canadian-American science fiction action film directed by Jesse V. Johnson and starring Mark Dacascos, Emma Lahana with Billy Zane and Amelia Cooke.

== Plot ==
Rykker is an intergalactic warrior trapped on Earth, constantly fighting a gang of ruthless aliens known as The Syndicate, an alien fifth column plotting to take over the planet. The film opens with a high speed chase, with Rykker killing several syndicate agents.

Saylon is a top syndicate leader who crash-lands on Earth. His mission is to build a wormhole portal between Earth and his home planet - allowing a full-scale invasion of the Earth. Isis is the Syndicate's sexy and ruthless leader. During a series of robberies for parts to build the portal, Isis becomes determined to destroy Rykker.

Fifteen-year-old Julie's family was killed when a truck carrying materials for the portal was hijacked. Left alone in the world, she plots to avenge her family. Julie and Rykker hook up, though he tries to leave her behind for her own safety. But she keeps showing up, even saving Rykker's life one time. They go on a cross country journey, with Isis and her army in pursuit. The final showdown inside a nuclear reactor, has Rykker and Julie battling Isis, Saylon and their army of killers in an attempt to destroy the portal and stop the invasion.

== Cast ==
- Mark Dacascos as Rykker
- Amelia Cooke as Isis
- Emma Lahana as Julie
- William MacDonald as Sheriff Devlin
- Kim Coates as Carl Roderick
- Billy Zane as Tom Hanson / Saylon
- Dominiquie Vandenberg as Sartek
- Annabel Kershaw as Aunt Lorry
- Jim Shield as Jack Braden
- John Tench as C.C.
- Keith Gordey as Uncle Jim
- Meghan Flather as Amber
- Sean O. Roberts as Jerry
- Darren Shahlavi as Kaylor
- Derek Hamilton as Joe
- Lindsay Maxwell as Monica

== Reception ==
The film was not well received by critics. Adam-Troy Castro in Sci Fi Weekly described the work as "a not-very-interesting alien invasion fought by a not-very-interesting hero and not-very-interesting heroine." Leah Holmes from SFX magazine gave it 1.5/5, saying "It's stupid and nonsensical, but at least it's funny" and George Tiller of PopMatters gave it just 1/10.
