= Anytown (film) =

- Film poster
- Directed by: Dave Rodriguez
- Written by: Zak Meyers; Dave Rodriguez
- Produced by: Matt Keith; George M. Kostuch; Dave Rodriguez
- Starring: Matt O'Leary; Marshall Allman; Jonathan Halyalkar; Sam Murphy; Ross Britz; Brooke Johnson; Meghan Stansfield; Paul Ben-Victor; Natasha Henstridge
- Cinematography: John Barr
- Edited by: Lauren A. Schaffer
- Music by: Phil Symonds
- Release date: April 10, 2009
- Country: United States
- Language: English

Anytown is a 2009 drama film written and directed by Dave Rodriguez. The film has won three film awards. "Best Picture" at the Charleston International Film Festival, "Excellence in Filmmaking" at the Method Fest Independent Film Festival and "Best Screenplay" at the Long Island International Film Expo. The film was later released under the title American Bully. The story revolves around the outcomes of war in Iraq and the effects on an individual.

== Cast ==
- Matt O'Leary as Brandon O'Leary
- Marshall Allman as Mike Grossman
- Jonathan Halyalkar as Eric Singh
- Sam Murphy as Bo Aznabev
- Ross Britz as Kyle Castranovo
- Brooke Johnson as Michelle
- Meghan Stansfield as Charlotte
- Paul Ben-Victor as Principal Wheeler
- Natasha Henstridge as Carol Mills
- Brendan Aguillard as Young Boy I

== Reception ==
In his review for Variety, Robert Koehler said that "repping a major improvement for director/co-writer Dave Rodriguez on his previous project, 2006’s Push, the new drama tightens the screws and generates some wrenching tension, some of it apparently influenced by the more grueling films of Michael Haneke."
