= Not Since You =

2009 romantic drama film

- Film poster
- Directed by: Jeff Stephenson
- Written by: Jane Kelly Kosek; Brent Laffoon; Jeff Stephenson
- Produced by: Jane Kelly Kosek
- Starring: Desmond Harrington; Kathleen Robertson; Christian Kane; Jon Abrahams; Sunny Mabrey; Will Estes; Elden Henson
- Cinematography: Helge Gerull
- Edited by: Avril Beukes
- Music by: Christopher Brady
- Release dates: October 25, 2009 (Hollywood Film Festival); May 14, 2010
- Running time: 90 minutes
- Country: United States
- Language: English

Not Since You is a 2009 romantic drama film directed by Jeff Stephenson and starring Desmond Harrington and Elden Henson. The film premiered at the 2009 Hollywood Film Festival, and released to theatres in Athens, Georgia, on April 2, 2010.

== Plot ==
A romantic drama about a tight-knit group of college friends who graduated from New York University the year of 9/11 and reunite years later for a weekend wedding in Georgia. Unresolved conflicts and love affairs spark again into the reality of the group. Old wounds are brought to the surface. Several uncanny similarities to "The Big Chill", where college friends gather for the funeral of one of their group, in a southern locale.

== Cast ==
- Desmond Harrington as Sam Nelson
- Kathleen Robertson as Amy Smith
- Christian Kane as Ryan Roberts
- Jon Abrahams as Howard Stieglitz
- Sunny Mabrey as Victoria Gary
- Will Estes as Billy Sweetzer
- Elden Henson as Joey 'Fudge' Fudgler
- Sara Rue as Sarah 'Doogs' Doogins
- Barry Corbin as Uncle Dennis
- Liane Balaban as Heather
