= The Last Witness (1999 film) =

- Screenplay by: Craig Smith
- Directed by: Graeme Clifford
- Starring: Natasha Henstridge; Johnathon Schaech; Lauren Hutton
- Music by: Christophe Beck
- Country of origin: United States
- Original language: English

Production
- Producers: Armand Mastroianni; Karl Malone; Frank Siracusz; Jeffrey Martin
- Cinematography: Bill Wong
- Editor: Stan Cole
- Running time: 88 minutes
- Production company: Citadel Entertainment

Original release
- Network: HBO
- Release: December 1999

The Last Witness is a 1999 made-for-TV movie which was originally titled Caracara. It was written by Craig Smith and directed by Graeme Clifford. Release date was 1 December 1999. The cast included Natasha Henstridge, Johnathon Schaech, and Lauren Hutton.

== Plot ==
In New York City, museum ornithologist Rachel Sutherland is fully engrossed in her work, with no time for outside interests or romance, when she is approached by FBI agents who ask to use her apartment as a command post to track and apprehend a South African operative who is planning to assassinate SA President Nelson Mandela. As this tracking operation unfolds, Sutherland finds herself attracted to McMillan, the apparent leader of the group, but along the way she comes to realize that, instead of being an FBI agent, McMillan is actually the SA operative, who is maneuvering to eliminate all witnesses to the planned operation, including Sutherland herself. She manages to escape, even while thwarting his attempts to assassinate the others who are aware.

== Production ==
This film was made on an unusually modest budget, filmed in Canada as a stand-in for New York City. It was shown on television HBO (with an R rating) under the title Caracara, which is described in the movie as a 'species of peregrine falcon', and which supposedly was the type of bird that was housed in Sutherland's flat. In fact, the term 'peregrine falcon' is a stand-alone species, and also the bird used for this production was a Harris's hawk and only superficially resembles a true caracara.

== Cast ==
- Natasha Henstridge as Rachel Sutherland
- Johnathon Schaech as David J. McMillan
- Michael Filipowich as Jack Pellegrino
- David McIlwraith as Alan Crancer
- Robin Brûlé as Christy Dyer
- Lauren Hutton as Cynthia Kirkman Sutherland
- Kate Greenhouse as Detective Deena Mason
