= Trapped Ashes =

2006 American horror anthology film

- Directed by: Sean S. Cunningham; Joe Dante; Monte Hellman; Ken Russell; John Gaeta
- Written by: Dennis Bartok
- Starring: Jayce Bartok; Amelia Cooke; Lara Harris; Ryo Ishibashi; Scott Lowell; Luke Macfarlane; Michéle-Barbara Pelletier; Tahmoh Penikett; Tygh Runyan; Rachel Veltri; John Saxon; Henry Gibson
- Cinematography: Zoran Popovic; Makoto Watanabe
- Edited by: Marcus Manton
- Music by: Kenji Kawai
- Distributed by: Independent Film Fund; Cinema Investment; Tokyo Broadcasting System
- Release date: September 12, 2006
- Running time: 105 minutes
- Country: United States
- Language: English

Trapped Ashes is a 2006 American anthology horror film with segments directed by Sean S. Cunningham, Joe Dante, Monte Hellman, Ken Russell, and John Gaeta, and stars Jayce Bartok, Henry Gibson, and Lara Harris.

== Plot ==
"Wraparound" (Joe Dante)
In the frame story seven strangers visiting Hollywood movie studios are brought to an ill-famed House of Horror by Desmond the tour guide (Henry Gibson) and find themselves locked inside. To leave the trap alive, they have to tell their most terrifying stories.
"The Girl with Golden Breasts" (Ken Russell)
Phoebe (Rachel Veltri) receives breast implants made of reconstituted human corpse tissue but the implants exhibit an appetite for human blood.
"Jibaku" (Sean S. Cunningham)
Henry (Scott Lowell) and Julia (Lara Harris) visit Japan, where Julia is seduced by a spirit attempting to draw her into Jigoku.
"Stanley's Girlfriend" (Monte Hellman)
Leo (Tahmoh Penikett) has an affair with fellow filmmaker Stanley's (Tygh Runyan) girlfriend Nina (Amelia Cooke), a witch who drinks the blood of her lovers to gain immortality.
"My Twin, the Worm" (John Gaeta)

Natalie's mother Martine (Michèle-Barbara Pelletier) cannot treat her tapeworm without losing her unborn child and must allow them both to grow inside her. Once born, Natalie continues to be compelled to feed the worm.

== Cast ==
- Jayce Bartok as Andy
- Henry Gibson as Tour Guide
- Lara Harris as Julia
- Scott Lowell as Henry
- Dick Miller as Max
- Rachel Veltri as Phoebe
- Michèle-Barbara Pelletier as Nathalie / Martine
  - Matreya Fedor as Young Nathalie
- John Saxon as Leo
  - Tahmoh Penikett as Young Leo
- Andy Maton as Stanley
  - Tygh Runyan as Young Stanley
- Yoshinori Hiruma as Seishin
- Amelia Cooke as Nina
- Ryo Ishibashi as Head Monk
- Luke Macfarlane as Vincent
- Richard Ian Cox as Doug
- Ken Russell as Lucy
- Deanna Milligan as Annie
- Jerry Wasserman as Stengel

== Reception ==
The film received a 33% approval rating on a Rotten Tomatoes review (average rating 4.3/10).
