= Rachel Veltri =

American actress and model (born 1978)

- Born: February 26, 1978 (age 47); Chicago, Illinois, United States
- Occupations: Actress; Model
- Years active: 2004–present
- Parent: Michael Veltri

Rachel Veltri (born February 26, 1978, in Chicago, Illinois) is an American actress and model. Veltri came to prominence on the television show, For Love or Money. To coincide with the release of American Pie Presents: Band Camp, she posed nude for Playboy magazine in the December 2005 issue.

== Filmography ==
- The Director's Choice (short) (2010) - Director's Assistant
- Bones (2010) TV Series - Harriet Soloway (1 episode)
- Rodney (2008) - Flight Attendant (1 episode)
- Trapped Ashes (2006) - Phoebe
- Pray for Morning (2005) - Bunny
- The King of Queens (2005) TV Series - Vanessa (1 episode)
- American Pie Presents: Band Camp (2005) (V) - Dani
- For Love or Money seasons 3 and 4 (2004) TV Series - Herself
