= Dennis Feldman =

American film producer

- Born: Dennis Jeffrey Feldman; 1946 (age 79–80); United States
- Occupations: Screenwriter, producer, director, photographer

Dennis Jeffrey Feldman (born 1946) is an American screenwriter, photographer, film producer and director.

== Biography ==
=== Early life and photography ===
Feldman is the son of Phil Feldman, an attorney who became a Hollywood producer and executive. He has three brothers, Ken, Gary and Randy. Dennis even worked on Phil's best known, 1969's The Wild Bunch, with a small appearance on the opening Texas town sequence.

Feldman graduated from Harvard University, where he became interested in photography and design, partly due to his upbringing close to the film industry. He worked a while as a documentary photographer, then studied graphic design at the Yale School of Art and Architecture. Feldman went on to earn acclaim as a still photographer, teaching photography for ten years at San Francisco City College, Boston University and UCLA. He has released two photography books: American Images (1977), the result of an eleven-month travel on 49 of the 50 United States; and Hollywood Boulevard, 1969–1972 (2015), which he described as "a '70s version of what Robert Frank and Walker Evans" did in the '50s", registering the people who wandered through Hollywood Boulevard – which Feldman frequently visited as his wife has a store there.

=== Film career ===
Feldman then decided to work in the film industry, first with the help of fellow writer brother Randy, with both doing script doctoring. Feldman's first film credit was Just One of the Guys (1985), co-written with Jeff Franklin. Afterwards his screenplay The Golden Child attracted a bidding war that was won by Paramount Pictures. Feldman was paid about $330,000 up front for the script and had the option to direct, but eventually the studio picked Michael Ritchie for the task. Originally titled The Rose of Tibet, it was planned to be "a Raymond Chandler movie with supernatural elements", but the eventual film, released in 1986, became a comedy starring Eddie Murphy. Feldman then had his directing debut adapting his script Real Men (1987) and produced Dead Again (1991), which he also developed the story with Scott Frank. In 1995 Feldman wrote and co-produced Species, based on a script idea he had in 1985. He also penned a comic book adaptation of the film by Dark Horse Comics and helped Yvonne Navarro write the film's novelization. In the 1990s, he attempted to write a film version of the Foundation Trilogy for New Line Cinema, but it never came to fruition. His latest screenwriter credit is Virus (1999), which Feldman contributed some drafts after the ones made by Chuck Pfarrer, author of the original comic.

Feldman has also been part of the Writers Guild of America, West board from 1998 to 2003, being part of the Screenwriters Council, Public Presence Subcommittee, and heading the WGAW Awards Committee and show.

== Filmography ==
Year	Title	Director	Producer	Writer	Notes
1985	Just One of the Guys	No	Co-producer	Yes	
1986	The Golden Child	No	Co-producer	Yes	
1987	Real Men	Yes	No	Yes	
1991	Dead Again	No	Co-producer	No	
1995	Species	No	Yes	Yes	
1998	Species II	No	Executive	Yes	
1999	Virus	No	No	Yes	
2004	Species III	No	No	Yes	TV movie
2007	Species – The Awakening	No	No	Yes	TV movie

Acting roles

Year	Title	Role	Notes
1969	The Wild Bunch	Townsperson	Uncredited
2017	Broken Chains	Night Club Patron	

Other credits

Year	Title	Role
1985	The New Kids	Production executive
2011	Ticking Clock	Special thanks
