= Frank Mancuso Jr. =

American film producer (born 1958)

- Born: Frank G. Mancuso; October 9, 1958 (age 68); Buffalo, New York, United States
- Occupations: Film producer, studio executive
- Spouse: Kimberly Mancuso
- Children: Gio, Mila
- Parent(s): Frank Mancuso Sr. Fay Mancuso

Frank G. Mancuso Jr. (born October 9, 1958) is an American film producer.

Mancuso, the son of the former Paramount Pictures president Frank Mancuso Sr., was born in Buffalo, New York. Mancuso produced sequels to Friday the 13th and co-created Friday the 13th: The Series.

Mancuso later produced Cool World, which he had heavily rewritten during production, Internal Affairs, the Species franchise, Hoodlum, Stigmata, Ronin, I Know Who Killed Me, Shorts and Road to Paloma.

== Filmography ==
He was a producer in all films unless otherwise noted.

=== Film ===
Year	Film	Credit	Notes
1981	Friday the 13th Part 2	Associate producer	
1982	Friday the 13th Part III		
1983	The Man Who Wasn't There		
1983	Off the Wall		
1984	Friday the 13th: The Final Chapter		
1985	Friday the 13th: A New Beginning	Executive producer	
1986	April Fool's Day		
1987	Back to the Beach		
1988	Permanent Record		
1988	Friday the 13th Part VII: The New Blood	Executive producer	Uncredited
1990	Internal Affairs		
1991	He Said, She Said		
1991	Body Parts		
1992	Cool World		
1995	Species		
1996	Fled		
1997	Hoodlum		
1998	Species II		
1998	Ronin		
1999	Stigmata		
2002	New Best Friend		
2005	The Lost City	Executive producer	
2006	Crossover		
2007	I Know Who Killed Me		
2008	April Fool's Day		Direct-to-video
2009	Shorts		
2011	Restless	Executive producer	
2011	10 Years	Executive producer	
2016	Johnny Frank Garrett's Last Word		
2026	Diamond		

As an actor

Year	Film	Role
1990	Internal Affairs	Radio Cop
2013	Crystal Lake Memories: The Complete History of Friday the 13th	Himself

Location management

Year	Film	Role
1980	Urban Cowboy	Location assistant

=== Television ===
Year	Title	Credit	Notes
1989−90	War of the Worlds	Executive producer	Second season
1987−90	Friday the 13th: The Series	Executive producer	Also co-creator
1996	The Limbic Region	Executive producer	Television film
1998	The Escape	Executive producer	Television film
2004	Species III	Executive producer	Television film
2007	Species – The Awakening		Television film

As writer

Year	Title
1987−90	Friday the 13th: The Series
