= Yvonne Navarro =

American author (born 1957)

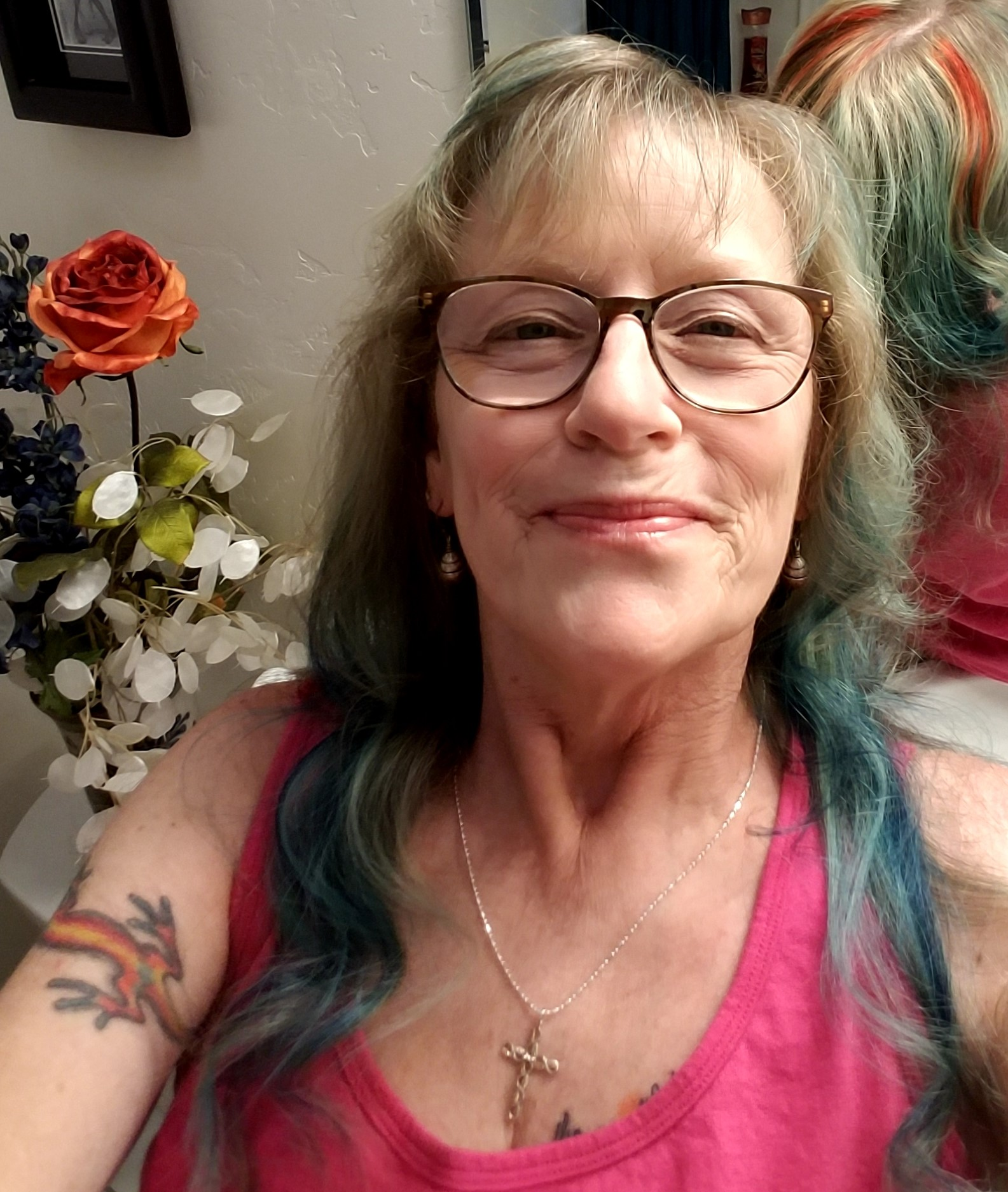
- Navarro in 2019
- Born: 1957 (age 67–68) Chicago, Illinois, U.S.
- Occupation: Author
- Notable awards: Bram Stoker Award (2002)
- Spouse: Weston Ochse (died 2023)

Website
- www.yvonnenavarro.com

Yvonne Navarro (born 1957 in Chicago, Illinois) is an American author who has published over twenty novels. Of those twenty, the titles AfterAge, deadrush, Final Impact, Red Shadows, DeadTimes, That's Not My Name and Mirror Me were solo novels, or fiction created solely by her. Her most recent works Highborn and Concrete Savior are also solo novels and are part of The Dark Redemption Series. She lives in Sierra Vista, Arizona and was married to author Weston Ochse.

== Awards ==
AfterAge was a finalist for the Horror Writers Association's 1993 Bram Stoker Award for Best First Novel. deadrush was a finalist for the Horror Writers Association's 1995 Bram Stoker Award, in the category of Superior Achievement in a Novel. Her 'Buffyverse' novel, The Willow Files, Vol. 2, won the 2002 Bram Stoker Award in the category of Works for Young Readers. Final Impact won the 1997 Chicago Women in Publishing Award for Excellence in Adult Fiction, and the Rocky Mountain News "Unreal Worlds" Award for Best Horror Paperback of 1997.

That's Not My Name was the First Place Winner of the Illinois Women's Press Association's 2001 Mate E. Palmer Communications Contest in the Fiction Novel Category. That's Not My Name was also the First Place Winner of the National Federation of Press Women's 2001 Communications Contest in the Fiction Novel Category. Buffy the Vampire Slayer: Paleo was the First Place Winner in the Illinois Women's Press Association's 2001 Mate E. Palmer Communications Contest in the Juvenile Book Category, and the Third Place Winner, National Federation of Press Women's 2001 Communications Contest in the Juvenile Book Category.

== Bibliography ==
=== Buffyverse ===
Yvonne Navarro has written seven novels related to the fictional 'Buffyverse':

- Wicked Willow. These include The Darkening, Shattered Twilight and Broken Sunrise.
- Paleo
- Tempted Champions
- The Willow Files, Vols. 1 and 2

She has contributed 'Buffyverse' short stories to:

- Tales of the Slayer Vols. 1 (2 stories) and 3
- How I Survived My Summer Vacation
- The Longest Night (2 stories)

=== Other tie-ins ===
She has written a number of media tie-in novels, including Elektra, Species, Species II, Aliens: Music of the Spears, Ultraviolet, and the first Hellboy. Her most recent original tie-in novel was Supernatural: The Usual Sacrifices, published by Titan Books on June 27, 2017.

=== Short stories and artwork ===
She contributed the story "Meet Me on the Other Side" to the collection The Children of Cthulhu. She has had well over a hundred other short stories published in small press magazines and professional anthologies. A number of her black and white illustrations also appeared in small press magazines in the 1990s.
