= Amelia Cooke =

American actress

- Born: May 24, 1979 (age 46); Colorado Springs, Colorado, USA
- Occupation(s): Model; Actress
- Years active: 2001–present

Amelia Webb Cooke (born May 24, 1979, in Colorado Springs, Colorado) is an American model, actress, and former professional ballet dancer. She made her film debut with Species III, and later starred in the 2007 science fiction action film Alien Agent. She also starred in the television series Tilt.

== Biography ==
Though born in Colorado Springs, she was raised in Toronto, Ontario, Canada. Prior to acting, Cooke studied at the Canadian National Ballet for ten years and toured with the organization as a student. She was awarded the "Outstanding Athlete of the Year" in Toronto in 1997. She later won the "Elite Look of the Year" model search in Canada and went on to work as a model in Germany, Paris and Milan in Europe, Tokyo in Japan, and Australia.

Her older brother is video game designer Jeramy Cooke.

She is married with two children and lives in Pupukia, Hawaii.

== Filmography ==
Film and television
Year	Title	Role	Notes
2001–2002	The Bold and the Beautiful	Fantasy Model	"1.3695", "1.3704"
2004	CSI: Miami	Katrina Hanagan	"Under the Influence"
2004	Species III	Amelia	Television film
2005	Tilt	Dee	Television series
2006	Trapped Ashes	Nina	Segment: "Stanley's Girlfriend"
2007	Alien Agent	Isis	Direct-to-video
2019–2020	Hawaii Five-0	Lead Doctor / Doctor	2 episodes
