= Species II =

- Theatrical release poster
- Directed by: Peter Medak
- Written by: Chris Brancato
- Based on: Characters by Dennis Feldman
- Produced by: Frank Mancuso Jr.
- Starring: Michael Madsen; Natasha Henstridge; Marg Helgenberger; Mykelti Williamson; George Dzundza; James Cromwell; Justin Lazard
- Cinematography: Matthew F. Leonetti
- Edited by: Richard Nord
- Music by: Edward Shearmur
- Production company: FGM Entertainment
- Distributed by: Metro-Goldwyn-Mayer Pictures
- Release date: April 10, 1998
- Running time: 93 minutes
- Country: United States
- Language: English
- Budget: $35 Million
- Box office: $19.2 million

Species II is a 1998 American science fiction horror thriller film directed by Peter Medak. The film is a sequel to Species (1995) and the second installment of the Species franchise. The film stars Michael Madsen, Natasha Henstridge, Marg Helgenberger, Mykelti Williamson, George Dzundza, James Cromwell and Justin Lazard. In addition to Madsen and Helgenberger reprising their roles, Henstridge also returned for the sequel as a new character. The plot has Patrick Ross, the astronaut son of Senator Judson Ross, being infected by an extraterrestrial organism during a mission to Mars and causing the deaths of many women upon his return. To stop him, the scientists who created the human-extraterrestrial hybrid Sil in the original Species try using a more docile clone of hers, Eve.

The film was theatrically released on April 10, 1998. It received negative reviews and grossed $19.2 million worldwide. A television film sequel, Species III, was released in 2004.

== Plot ==
While participating in a human mission to Mars, astronauts led by Commander Patrick Ross, Anne Sampas and Dennis Gamble collect soil samples. While returning to Earth, the soil thaws and releases an alien substance that contaminates them and causes a brief contact gap with mission control. The trio return to Earth to public celebration, but an institutionalized former scientist, Dr. Herman Cromwell, reacts to their return with violent panic. They are examined and quarantined to prevent them from engaging in sexual activity for ten days. However, Ross blatantly disregards this and has sex with two women, Marcy and Claudia. To his horror, the pair undergo accelerated pregnancies and die giving birth to human/alien hybrids, which he hides in his father, Senator Judson Ross', remote shed.

Meanwhile, under military supervision, scientists led by Dr. Laura Baker have created a more docile clone of Sil named Eve in an effort to understand the alien life form and prepare for defense should it ever arrive on Earth. While in isolation and undergoing tests, Eve shows signs of great physiological excitement every time Patrick engaged in sex. At the space center, Patrick sneaks into the lab and kills Dr. Orinsky, who was trying to contact Dr. Cromwell about the astronauts' blood samples. Analysis of the corpse reveals the presence of alien DNA, similar to, yet distinct from, Eve's. Baker reunites with former colleague Preston "Press" Lennox to contain the new threat and contact Cromwell, who reveals Mars was rendered uninhabitable by an alien species, he was institutionalized to silence his opposition to the Mars mission, and Orinsky tried to call him to confirm his fears.

Press and Laura find Sampas as she has sex with her husband Harry, only to suddenly become impregnated with an alien newborn, which kills the couple before Press and Baker kill it in turn. After government agents determine Gamble was not infected, the latter joins Baker and Press in their mission. Concurrently, Ross awakens to find his fiancée Melissa Evans dead, having given birth to another hybrid. Horrified, he attemps suicide, but his alien DNA fully takes over and regenerates his body before going on a killing spree to produce more offspring.

The scientists activate Eve's alien DNA so she can telepathically track Ross. Aware of this, he surrenders to Press and Gamble to infiltrate the lab and reach Eve as she goes into heat. However, he is chased off by Laura, Gamble and Press with a gaseous weapon. That night, Ross commands his offspring to form a cocoon so they can reach their adult stages and repeat the cycle on a global scale. After Baker discovers Gamble resisted infection because of his sickle cell trait, she plans to kill Ross with Gamble's DNA as the alien lacks immunity to human genetic diseases.

As Eve escapes to find him, the team track her to Ross's nest, where she and Ross mate until they are interrupted by Press. The team kill most of Ross's offspring. Baker begs Eve to help them, which she does, but a betrayed Patrick seemingly kills her. Press uses a pitchfork to draw Gamble's blood and attacks Ross, killing him. While the military arrive to escort the team away, Eve is loaded into an ambulance, where she is joined by Ross's remaining offspring, Portus, while her womb rapidly swells; the screen then goes black, leading to the events of the third film.

== Cast ==
- Natasha Henstridge as Eve
  - Monica Staggs as Alien Eve
- Michael Madsen as Preston "Press" Lennox
- Marg Helgenberger as Dr. Laura Baker
- Mykelti Williamson as Dennis Gamble
- George Dzundza as Colonel Carter Burgess Jr.
- James Cromwell as U.S. Senator Judson Ross
- Myriam Cyr as Anne Sampas
- Sarah Wynter as Melissa Evans
- Baxter Harris as Dr. Orinsky
- Justin Lazard as Patrick Ross
  - Vincent Hammond as Alien Patrick Ross
- Scott Morgan as Harry Sampas
- Nancy La Scala as Marcy
- Raquel Gardner as Claudia
- Robert Hogan as Pentagon personnel
- Ted Sutton as Pentagon personnel
- Kim Adams as Darlene
- Susan Duvall as a shopper
- Nat Benchley as squad leader
- Bill Boggs as himself
- Richard Belzer as U.S. President
- Peter Boyle as Dr. Herman Cromwell (uncredited)

== Production ==
Writer Chris Brancato was working with MGM on The Outer Limits, and knew the studio was interested in making a follow-up to Species. He pitched an idea to executive Greg Foster where this time two hybrid alien women would strike. Foster liked it, but once Brancato went to Species producer Frank Mancuso Jr., he asked to "approach this from a different angle, so that we don't have a tired retread of the original, as sequels often are". With that in mind, Brancato took inspiration from The Manchurian Candidate, where "somebody on a mission comes back, apparently a hero, but actually with some terrible demon inside", and as "the notion of a grand, unexplored place was the planet Mars", he made, Patrick Ross, the first astronaut on Mars – as according to NASA scientists consulted by Brancato, human exploration of Mars was "a possibility – just a very expensive one" – be infected by alien DNA. Mancuso approved the idea, and thus Brancato explored how this new villain was one "for whom we can briefly feel a strange, Wolf Man-like sympathy – he's not responsible for having been turned into a monster" and had him face an alien woman similar to Sil, raising the doubt on whether they would battle or mate. As Natasha Henstridge was unconfirmed to return, Brancato wrote the new female, Eve, as if it was "either Natasha or a similarly beautiful woman". Henstridge still liked the script enough and the idea of working with director Peter Medak to sign for the sequel. Brancato decided to bring back two of the surviving characters from Species, Michael Madsen's Press Lennox and Marg Helgenberger's Dr. Laura Baker feeling they "were essential to bring the audience back in", but knowing Forest Whitaker was probably too busy to return as Dan Smithson, he wrote a similar African American character, Dennis Gamble, eventually portrayed by Mykelti Williamson. Mancuso had another script done simultaneously to Brancato's, which reportedly explored the cliffhanger ending of Species where a rat was infected after eating Sil's remains. Mancuso brought in Peter Medak, responsible for the 1980 horror film The Changeling.

The nature of the alien species is explored to a slightly greater extent in the second film. Scientist and professor Dr. Herman Cromwell (Peter Boyle) claims that they originated in the Large Magellanic Cloud (also called the Magellanic Galaxy), due to it apparently being the only other place carbon-based life forms have been discovered. It is also stipulated that they were a "cancerous" race that visited Mars millions of years ago and annihilated all life on its surface (which is described in the film as being Earth-like at that time) before leaving a remnant of their own DNA in its soil. This DNA was intended to be picked up by other visitors so that their species could continue to infect other inhabited planets.

The aliens basically appear to be bipedal (humanoid) forms. Unlike other aliens in the Species series, however, Patrick Ross (Justin Lazard) has two types of alien forms: mating form and combat form. Patrick's alien form for copulation is bipedal, humanoid, and male version of Eve's, while Patrick's alien form for combat (so-called "Fighting Patrick") is quadrupedal, bigger, and more "brutish" in appearance than Eve. His second stage appearance is also similar to the Xenomorphs of the Alien films; both were designed with input from H. R. Giger.

== Release ==
=== Home media ===
Species II was released on VHS and DVD on October 20, 1998.

== Reception ==
=== Box office ===
The film ranked number four on its opening weekend behind City of Angels, Lost in Space and Titanic, with earnings of $7.4 million. Domestically, the film grossed only $19.2 million and $26,817,565 worldwide.

=== Critical response ===
On Rotten Tomatoes, it has an approval rating of 9% at based on 34 reviews. The site's critical consensus reads: "Clumsily exploitative and sloppily assembled, Species II fails to clear the rather low bar set by its less-than-stellar predecessor". On Metacritic, the film has a score of 19% based on reviews from 13 critics, indicating "overwhelming dislike". Audiences polled by CinemaScore gave the film an average grade of "C" on an A+ to F scale. At the 1998 Stinkers Bad Movie Awards, the film was nominated for Worst Sequel but lost to I Still Know What You Did Last Summer.

Dwayne E. Leslie from Box Office Magazine gave the film 1 out of 5 stars calling it "a sequel that doesn't measure up", also heavily criticizing the film's predictable and open ending. Joe Leydon from Variety magazine called the film "a half-baked rehash". He praised the special effects and technical aspects of the film but added "that's not nearly enough to camouflage the inherent crumminess". James Berardinelli described the film as awful but added "there's enough blood, gore, simulated sex, and bare flesh to prevent it from ever becoming boring".

Co-star Michael Madsen was displeased with the film according to his statement in a 2004 interview. In the DVD commentary director, Peter Medak praised the films' special effects. He expressed his opinion that audiences had too much expectation as this was a very different sequel due to not continuing from the story with the alien-infected rat that survived the finale, which hinted at a sequel in the 1995 original. Medak also admitted being uncomfortable with the amount of nudity in the film but said it was for the purpose of the story.

== Sequel ==
A sequel titled Species III, was released in 2004.

== Other media ==
=== Merchandise ===
To coincide with the film, McFarlane Toys released an Eve and Patrick (in their alien form) action figure as part of their inaugural series of Movie Maniacs action figures. Both action figures came with a replica of the film's poster with skulls and bones base. Eve came with an alternate head. Two Eve action figures were produced which was dubbed the PG and R rated version. The R rated Eve action figure (in her alien form) had nipples on her breasts while the PG figure didn't. The R rated figure was released only in comic book and other collectable stores while the PG figure was released in toy stores.

The film's soundtrack on CD includes a track by B. B. King, one by Apollo 440 and 9 score pieces composed by Edward Shearmur.

=== Novelization ===
As with the first film, Yvonne Navarro wrote a novelization based on the original screenplay which gives plot and character details not seen in the film. For example, the book tells how, due to limited knowledge of the outside world, Eve does not know if Superman is a real life personality or not. It is also hinted that she was able to learn a degree of martial arts by watching old action films. In the film, Eve is shot by soldiers, but after being briefly incapacitated her body regenerates and she continues to escape. Soldiers continue to shoot at her, but Eve manages to run past them; why she is unharmed is left unexplained. The book explains that her skin adapts (in a way similar to how her body adapts to the gas test earlier in the film), becoming bulletproof.

== See also ==
- Life (2017 film)
- List of films set on Mars
