= Real Men (film) =

1987 film by Dennis Feldman

- Theatrical release poster
- Directed by: Dennis Feldman
- Written by: Dennis Feldman
- Produced by: Martin Bregman
- Starring: James Belushi; John Ritter
- Cinematography: John A. Alonzo
- Edited by: Malcolm Campbell; Glenn Farr
- Music by: Miles Goodman
- Production company: Martin Bregman Productions
- Distributed by: United Artists
- Release date: September 25, 1987
- Running time: 85 minutes
- Country: United States
- Language: English
- Box office: $873,903

Real Men is a 1987 American science fiction comedy film by Dennis Feldman, starring James Belushi and John Ritter as the heroes: suave, womanizing CIA agent Nick Pirandello (Belushi) and weak and ineffectual insurance agent Bob Wilson (Ritter).

== Plot ==
After scientists accidentally spill a deadly chemical into the ocean that will eventually kill all life on earth, a group of aliens offer to help humanity. They offer a choice: the 'Good Package' to clean up the mess, or the 'Big Gun', a weapon capable of destroying the planet. The aliens only ask for a glass of water in return, which must be delivered by CIA agent Pillbox, the only human they entirely trust.

While on a run-thru of the alien meetup, agent Pillbox is shot and killed in a forest by an unseen assassin in an inside-job. FBI computers find Bob Wilson, an insurance agent who looks just like Pillbox, and suggest sending Wilson in Pillbox's place. However, Wilson is a meek office worker who we initially see being easily pushed around by a group of local bullies and by a milkman who is trying to seduce his wife.

Tough guy government agent Nick Pirandello is sent to recruit Wilson and escort him to the meeting; he is also to build-up Wilson's confidence and decrease his insecurities. He meets Wilson at Wilson's home, with Russian agents close on his tail, who want a unique map to the meeting place. Wilson thinks Pirandello is an intruder and tries ineffectively to attack him, culminating in a shoot-out with the Russians that devastates Wilson's house.

Pirandello explains the mission as the pair head to meet the aliens near Washington, D.C. Wilson doesn't believe the story, and instead believes that Pirandello is insane. He repeatedly tries to escape, forcing Pirandello to stop and try to convince him the aliens are real. After a series of rather unconvincing demonstrations, he finally convinces Wilson of their authenticity.

Wilson is then willing to do the job, but lacks skills and confidence. The pair meet corrupt CIA agents dressed as clowns, part of a splinter group that would rather receive the Big Gun. Pirandello tells Wilson that he is in fact a Russian sleeper "Super Agent", at which point Wilson charges into battle and is knocked out with one punch. Pirandello defeats the clowns, but leads the waking/groggy Wilson to believe he did it. Wilson gains a new macho attitude.

Pirandello, weakened by love for a dominatrix he meets in a bar in Pittsburgh, abandons the mission, leaving Wilson on his own. During a final shootout between the rogue CIA element and Wilson, Pirandello comes to his senses and rejoins the mission; together they defeat the others, including Pirandello's boss. Wilson meets with the aliens and receives the Good Package to save humanity.

Wilson returns to his home, which has been repaired. With his new-found machismo, he deals with the bullies and the amorous milkman, bringing the film to an end.

== Cast ==
- Jim Belushi as Nick Pirandello (credited as James Belushi)
- John Ritter as Bob Wilson
- Barbara Barrie as Mom Pirandello
- Bill Morey as Millard Cunard
- Isa Jank as Dolly (credited as Isa Anderson)
- Gail Barle as Sherry
- Mark Herrier as Bradshaw
- Matthew Brooks as Bob Wilson Jr.
- Mariah Dobson as Heather Wilson
- Stephen Corvin as Russian Agent
- Charles Walker as Mahoney
- Dyanne Thorne as Dad Pirandello
- Don Dolan as Ufoe
- Suzee Slater as Woman In Bed
- James Le Gros as Buddy MacGruder (credited as James LeGros)
- Bruce M. Fischer as Steelworker
- Hardy Rawls as Cop
- Isabella Hofmann as Barbara Wilson
- Buck Kartalian as Produce Hawker
- Jophery Brown as Clown (uncredited)

== Production ==
Real Men was barely released theatrically. The distributor, United Artists, was still suffering the aftereffects of the Heaven's Gate (1980) fiasco and financial troubles were still in full force.

== Reception ==
Upon release, the film received mediocre to poor reviews. In particular, the plot was panned as not credible.

Years later, The A.V. Club retrospectively described the film as one of the most underrated comedies of the 1980s.
