= Species III =

2004 American science fiction thriller television film

- Promotional release poster
- Based on: Characters by Dennis Feldman
- Written by: Ben Ripley
- Directed by: Brad Turner
- Starring: Robin Dunne; Robert Knepper; Amelia Cooke; J.P. Pitoc; Michael Warren; Christopher Neame; Natasha Henstridge; Sunny Mabrey
- Music by: Elia Cmiral
- Country of origin: United States
- Original language: English

Production
- Executive producer: Frank Mancuso Jr.
- Producer: David Dwiggins
- Cinematography: Christian Sebaldt
- Editor: James Coblentz
- Running time: 112 minutes
- Production companies: MGM Television; FGM Entertainment

Original release
- Network: Syfy
- Release: November 27, 2004

Related
- Species II (1998); Species – The Awakening (2007)

Species III is a 2004 American science fiction action thriller television film. The film is a sequel to Species II (1998) and the third installment of the Species franchise. Directed by Brad Turner, it stars Robin Dunne, Robert Knepper, Sunny Mabrey, Amelia Cooke and John Paul Pitoc. Natasha Henstridge, who was contracted to a trilogy commencing with the first Species film, briefly reprises the role of Eve in the opening scene.

The film premiered on the American Sci Fi Channel on November 27, 2004, and released on DVD on December 7, in both a standard and an unrated version. The film was shot in HD video.

== Plot ==
The ambulance transporting Eve's corpse becomes lost. (Note: This story takes place hours after the events of the previous film.) However, when the co-driver Robert Kelley tries to radio their superiors, the driver, Dr. Bruce Abbot, stops and holds him at gunpoint. They are ambushed by Portus, who kills Kelley with his tongue. Abbot discovers Portus and Eve alive in the back of the ambulance; Portus strangles Eve to death while she gives birth to a newborn alien, which Abbot flees with. Government agent Wasach orders an autopsy, discovering Eve's pregnancy, then orders the burning of her body.

Abbot returns to his usual job teaching biochemistry at a university. He also raises Eve's child, who grows into a young girl; Abbot names her Sara. One night, Portus, who has dramatically aged and is critically ill, visits Abbot's office. Abbot tries to treat Portus, who demands to see Sara and reveals that there are other half-breeds suffering from similar illnesses. Portus soon dies while sitting in the chair. Meanwhile Abbot's funding for an experimental power plant project is in jeopardy. Abbot asks for his student Dean's aid in perfecting the alien DNA to save the species. In return, Abbot promises Dean a share of any funding or awards their work receives.

In Abbot's absence, Sara pupates inside a cocoon and emerges as an adult. Abbot's superior, Dr. Nicholas Turner, arrives at the house seeking Abbot and comes across Sara. She initially tries to seduce Turner but then rejects him. He attempts to rape Sara, who kills him and leaves to seek a mate. Abbot returns home, sees evidence of Sara's transformation and disposes of Turner's body. Sara eventually connects with Yosef, another half-breed, but discovers his illnesses and knocks his tooth out. Abbot and Dean later continue their experiments on Sara. Abbot informs Dean of the government's "Project Athena", which previously created Sil, (Note: As depicted in the first film.) and Sara's heritage as the child of Patrick Ross infected with alien DNA from Mars and Eve, Sil's clone. Yosef breaks into the lab, mortally wounds Abbot and attempts to impregnate Sara, but is killed by hydrochloric gas Abbot sprays over the lab. Dean ponders whether to continue Abbot's work until Sara urges him to save her species.

Dean's roommate at the university, Hastings, discovers a website posted by Amelia, a woman who wants to date biochemists. After snooping through Dean's notes, he forwards them to Amelia, who agrees to meet him. En route, Amelia - who is another half-breed - has sex with and murders Cobb, a gas station attendant who attempts to rape her. At the campus, she senses Sara and kidnaps Hastings, taking him to Abbot's home. Amelia and Sara force Hastings to work on perfecting the alien DNA using Sara's purer biology to save the half-breeds and create perfect mating partners for them. Wasach, whose team also monitored Amelia's website and discovered its connection to Project Athena, picks up Dean and helps him save Hastings.

Dean, Hastings and Wasach flee to Dean's experimental power plant with Sara and Amelia in pursuit. While attempting to keep Sara's harvested eggs away from them, the three decide to try trapping Amelia and Sara in the plant's core, but this tactic risks causing a catastrophic meltdown. Dean drops the eggs into the core, prompting Amelia to attempt to kill him. Sara then attacks and throws Amelia into the core as well. Dean, Hastings and Wasach close the core in time to prevent a meltdown.

Later, Hastings visits Dean at Abbot's home and discovers both Sara and a half-breed alien boy. Dean reveals that he pulled Sara to safety before sealing the plant's core, then completed the refined alien DNA to create a mate for her so she would not be alone. After the boy is grown, Dean tells Sara that she is on her own and to be careful. Before Sara and her mate leave, Dean asks why she saved him from Amelia, but she does not answer. Dean then reassures the nervous Hastings that he ensured Sara's mate would be sterile, preventing them from reproducing.

== Cast ==
- Robin Dunne as Dean
- Robert Knepper as Dr. Bruce Abbot
- Amelia Cooke as Amelia
- J.P. Pitoc as Hastings
- Michael Warren as Agent Wasach
- Christopher Neame as Dr. Nicholas Turner
- Patricia Bethune as Colleen
- Joel Stoffer as Portus
  - Christopher R. Gillum as Young Portus
- James Leo Ryan as Yosef
- Sunny Mabrey as Sara
  - Savanna Fields as Young Sara
- Natasha Henstridge as Eve
- Reed Frerichs as ISD Staffer
- Marc D. Wilson as Crew Chief
- Matthew Yang King as Specialist Robert Kelley
- Dan Wells as Jake
- Rick Dean as Cobb
- Carl Ciarfalio as Guard
- Jason Sarcinelli as Sara's Mate (uncredited)
- Kari Ann Peniche as Cheerleader (uncredited)

== Production ==
=== Development ===
Executive producer Frank Mancuso Jr., who also worked on the previous Species films, wanted the sequel to be aimed more at young adults, so the characters were written to be younger than what was originally planned. They decided to cast Sunny Mabrey as the main alien Sara and Amelia Cooke cast as Amelia. Also, Mancuso wanted the creatures to look slightly different from H.R. Giger's original concept. The alien species was then redesigned by Rob Hinderstien.

== Reception ==
=== Critical response ===
Species III received mostly negative reviews, holding a 17% rating on Rotten Tomatoes based on six reviews. DVD Talk negatively reviewed the film saying "this film is underdeveloped with an absurd plot and bad special effects, this film just reuses old ideas and is not worth your time, it is a pointless sequel that lacks an effective story to make it a watchable film, it is just camouflaged by nudity". Den of Geek said: "If you are going to start watching this franchise, you should give this one a miss and cut straight to the final film".

== Sequel ==
A fourth film, Species – The Awakening, was released straight-to-television in 2007. While it does continue the Species franchise, it was a standalone sequel, not a direct follow-up to Species III.
