= Marg Helgenberger =

American actress (born 1958)

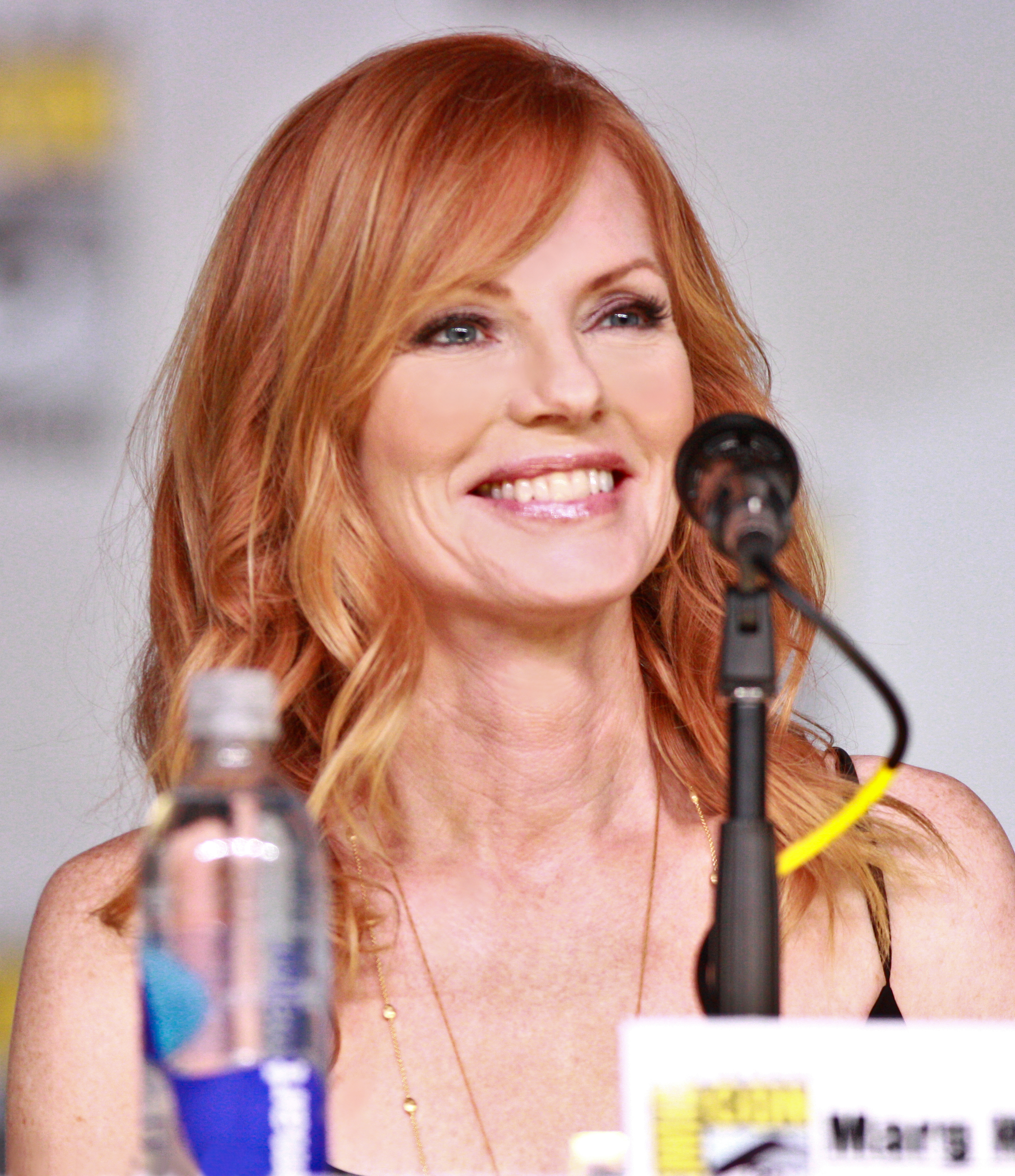
- Helgenberger at the 2013 San Diego Comic-Con
- Born: Mary Margaret Helgenberger; November 16, 1958 (age 68); Fremont, Nebraska, U.S.
- Other names: Marg Helgenberger; Mary Helgenberger
- Education: Northwestern University (B.S.)
- Occupation: Actress
- Years active: 1977–present
- Known for: China Beach • CSI: Crime Scene Investigation • CSI: Vegas
- Spouses: Alan Rosenberg (m. 1989; div. 2010); Charlie Haugk (m. 2022)
- Children: 1

Mary Margaret Helgenberger (born November 16, 1958) is an American actress. She began her career in the early 1980s and first came to attention for playing the role of Siobhan Ryan on the daytime soap opera Ryan's Hope from 1982 to 1986. She is best known for her role as Catherine Willows in the CBS police procedural drama CSI: Crime Scene Investigation (2000–13), the subsequent television film Immortality (2015), and the second and third seasons of the sequel series CSI: Vegas (2022–2024). Helgenberger is also known for playing the role of K.C. Koloski in the ABC drama China Beach (1988–91), which earned her the 1990 Emmy Award for Outstanding Supporting Actress in a Drama Series. She is also known for roles in the TV series Under the Dome and Intelligence, and the films Species (1995), Species II (1998), Erin Brockovich (2000), and Mr. Brooks (2007).

== Early life ==
Helgenberger was born November 16, 1958, in Fremont, Nebraska, to Mary Kay (née Bolte), a nurse, and Hugh Helgenberger, a meat inspector. She has an older sister Ann and a younger brother Curt. They are of Irish and German descent and had a Roman Catholic upbringing. They were raised in North Bend, Nebraska. She graduated from North Bend Central High School, where she played the French horn in its marching band.

Until college, Helgenberger aspired to be a nurse like her mother. She attended Kearney State College (now the University of Nebraska at Kearney) in Kearney, Nebraska, then Northwestern University's School of Speech (now the School of Communication) in Evanston, Illinois, earning a B.S. degree in speech and drama.

== Career ==
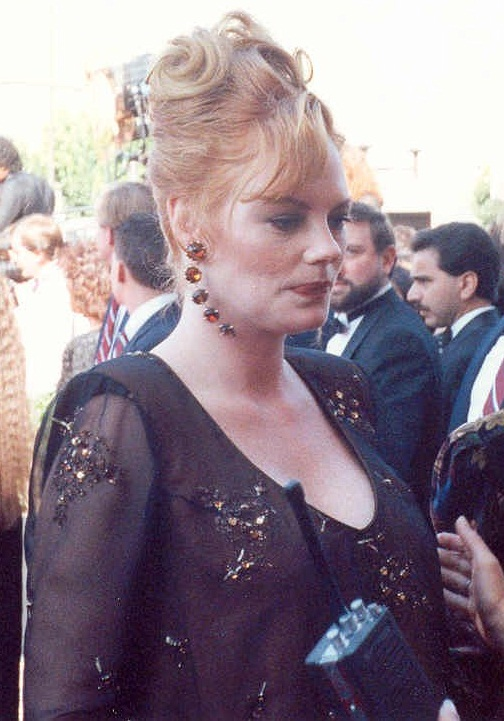
Helgenberger at the 1990 Emmy Awards

Helgenberger began as a nightly weathergirl at KHGI-TV, the ABC affiliate in Kearney, while attending college (her name was changed by the producer to Margi McCarty. McCarty was her grandmother's maiden name). During the summer, she also worked as a deboner at her father's meatpacking plant. After portraying the role of Blanche Dubois in a university production of A Streetcar Named Desire, she developed an interest in acting.

While performing in a summer 1981 NU campus production of Shakespeare's Taming of the Shrew, where she played Kate, Helgenberger was spotted by a scout for the TV soap opera Ryan's Hope.

Soon after completing college, Helgenberger landed her first professional role on the long-running ABC Daytime soap opera in March 1982, playing amateur cop Siobhan Ryan Novak DuBujak, a role previously played by Ann Gillespie. After nearly four years, Helgenberger left the show in January 1986 to pursue new opportunities.

Helgenberger guest-starred in episodes of the ABC series Spenser: For Hire, NBC's Matlock, and ABC's thirtysomething. She also played a regular role as Natalie Thayer, opposite Margot Kidder and James Read, on the six-episode drama comedy series Shell Game (1987).

She then starred as Karen Charlene "K.C." Koloski, a prostitute turned entrepreneur, on the ABC war drama series China Beach from 1988 to 1991. The role earned her an Emmy Award for Outstanding Supporting Actress in a Drama Series in 1990.

In 1989, Helgenberger made her feature-film debut in a leading role as an all-night answering-service operator in one segment of the Wheat brothers' horror anthology After Midnight. She followed it up with a role in Steven Spielberg's romantic comedy-drama Always (starring Richard Dreyfuss, Holly Hunter, and John Goodman), a modern version of the original 1943 Victor Fleming film A Guy Named Joe.

During the early to mid-1990s, Helgenberger played the love interest to Woody Harrelson's character in The Cowboy Way (1994), and had a small role as Capt. Alison Sinclair in Michael Bay's action comedy film Bad Boys (1995). She also played Dr. Laura Baker, a molecular biologist, in Roger Donaldson's science-fiction thriller, Species (1995), and reprised the role in a sequel, Species II (1998).

Helgenberger had roles in the television films Not on the Frontline and In Sickness and in Health. She played opposite Bruno Kirby in I'll Be Waiting, and as a novelist on the miniseries Stephen King's The Tommyknockers opposite Jimmy Smits. After playing a recurring role as George Clooney's love interest on NBC's medical drama ER, Helgenberger appeared as David Caruso's sex-starved widow on Showtime's Elmore Leonard's Gold Coast. She starred with Steven Seagal in the 1997 action film Fire Down Below and portrayed the furious sibling to Steven Weber's character on the miniseries about the elusive Gulf War syndrome, Thanks of a Grateful Nation. She also starred opposite Ann-Margret in Showtime's Happy Face Murders.

In 2000, Helgenberger made a guest appearance in the Valentine's Day episode of Frasier, in which Frasier (Kelsey Grammer) finally wears down his dad Martin's resistance and gets the older man to accompany him to the opera. Actually, this invitation is but a smokescreen, so that Frasier can "accidentally" run into his newest dream girl Emily (Helgenberger).

Starting in October 2000, Helgenberger starred in the role of Catherine Willows, a former show girl employed as a blood-spatter analyst, on the hit CBS drama CSI: Crime Scene Investigation. Her performance as the female lead has earned her two Emmy nominations and two Golden Globe nominations. In 2005, she and her fellow cast members won the Screen Actors Guild Award for Outstanding Performance by an Ensemble in a Drama Series. When CSI first started filming, Helgenberger visited the Clark County Coroner's Office to learn about her role, even viewing autopsies in progress. Helgenberger got the chance to act with her husband, Alan Rosenberg, when he guest-starred on CSI, season five ("Weeping Willows") and season seven ("Leaving Las Vegas").

During her time on the show, Helgenberger acted in the feature film Erin Brockovich and portrayed Patsy Ramsey on the miniseries about the mysterious murder of six-year-old beauty-pageant contestant JonBenét Ramsey in Perfect Murder, Perfect Town. She also starred as Dennis Quaid's wife and Scarlett Johansson's mother in writer-director Paul Weitz's romantic drama comedy In Good Company (2004).

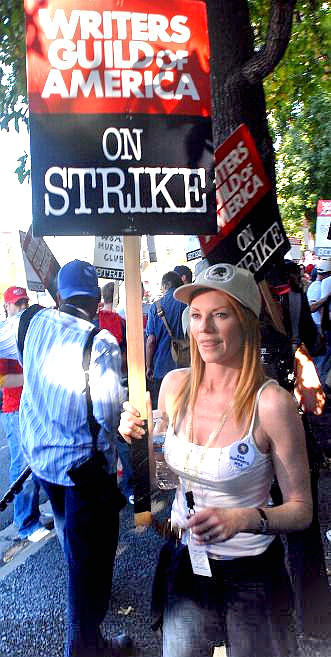
Helgenberger picketing during Writers Guild strike in 2007

In 2006, Helgenberger's hometown of North Bend, Nebraska, renamed the street on which Helgenberger had her childhood home "Helgenberger Avenue". In 2012, speaking to The Daily Northwestern - the Northwestern University's main student newspaper - she recalled that, "It really is pretty special. When I went back for the unveiling of it, which was about five years ago, I was very touched by it. A lot of people turned out, and there was a program up at my high school where the students were doing scenes from shows that I had done."

In 2007, she was in the film Mr. Brooks with Kevin Costner in which her character's daughter is played by Danielle Panabaker, the sister of Kay Panabaker, who plays her fictional daughter on CSI.

In April 2008, Helgenberger was chosen as an endorser of the Got Milk? campaign.

In December 2009, Forbes magazine placed Helgenberger third among primetime's top-earning women, with estimated earnings of $9.5 million, after Tyra Banks and Katherine Heigl.

Helgenberger received the 2,458th star on the Hollywood Walk of Fame on January 23, 2012, for her television work.

She lent her voice as Greek goddess Hera to the straight-to-video animated film Wonder Woman.

Following William Petersen's departure from CSI, Helgenberger became one of the two highest paid actors in any of the CSI franchises, earning $375,000 per episode, the same as David Caruso, and $25,000 more per episode than Laurence Fishburne.

Helgenberger appeared in only the first 12 episodes of the 12th season of CSI, as she wanted to return to the stage. The producers said they left the door open for Helgenberger if she wanted to return. Helgenberger left the show on January 25, 2012, during a two-part episode ("Ms. Willows Regrets" and "Willows in the Wind"). The last one was the most-watched episode of the season with 14.26 million viewers.

Helgenberger also starred as Lilian Strand in the series Intelligence alongside Josh Holloway and Meghan Ory. Additionally, she briefly returned to CSI as Catherine for the 300th episode. In February 2015, she joined the third season of Under the Dome.

In May–June 2014, Helgenberger acted onstage in a production of the 2011 play The Other Place by Sharr White, put on by the Barrington Stage Company in Pittsfield, Massachusetts. In September–October 2016, she appeared at the Arena Stage in Washington, D.C., in a revival of Lillian Hellman's The Little Foxes.

In 2022, Helgenberger became a series regular on CSI: Vegas, joining the show in its second season and reprising her long-running role of Catherine Willows.

== Personal life ==
In 1984, Helgenberger met Alan Rosenberg, a guest actor on Ryan's Hope. The two became friends and started dating in 1986. They married in 1989 and have one son. On December 1, 2008, the couple announced that they were separating, and on March 25, 2009, Helgenberger filed for divorce. Their divorce was finalized in February 2010.

As a result of Helgenberger's mother's 27-year battle against breast cancer, Helgenberger and Rosenberg became involved in breast-cancer-related charity and have hosted a benefit Marg and Alan's Celebrity Weekend annually in Omaha, Nebraska, since 1999.

In April 2022, Helgenberger married Charlie Haugk, with whom she had been in a relationship since the fall of 2019.

== Filmography ==
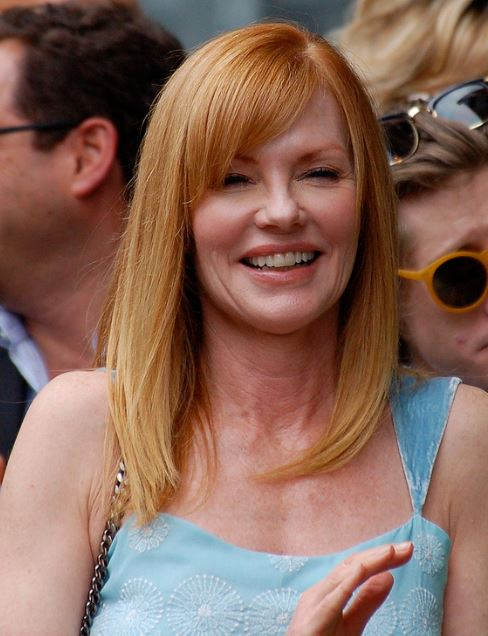
Helgenberger at a ceremony for Jerry Bruckheimer to receive a star on the Hollywood Walk of Fame in June 2013

=== Film ===
| Year | Title | Role | Notes |
|---|---|---|---|
| 1982 | Tootsie | Suzanne | |
| 1989 | After Midnight | Alex | |
| 1989 | Always | Rachel | |
| 1989 | Peacemaker | Mrs. Cooper | |
| 1991 | Crooked Hearts | Jennetta | |
| 1993 | Distant Cousins | Connie | |
| 1994 | The Cowboy Way | Margarette | |
| 1995 | Just Looking | Darlene Carpenter | |
| 1995 | Bad Boys | Capt. Alison Sinclair | |
| 1995 | Species | Dr. Laura Baker | |
| 1996 | Frame by Frame | Det. Rose Ekberg | |
| 1996 | My Fellow Americans | Joanna | Uncredited |
| 1997 | Fire Down Below | Sarah Kellogg | |
| 1997 | The Last Time I Committed Suicide | Lizzy | |
| 1998 | Species II | Dr. Laura Baker | |
| 1999 | Lethal Vows | Ellen Farris | |
| 2000 | Erin Brockovich | Donna Jensen | |
| 2004 | In Good Company | Ann Foreman | |
| 2007 | Mr. Brooks | Mrs. Emma Brooks | |
| 2008 | Columbus Day | Alice | |
| 2009 | Wonder Woman | Hera | Voice role |
| 2009 | Conan: Red Nail | Princess Tascela | |
| 2016 | Almost Friends | Samantha | |
| 2019 | A Dog's Journey | Hannah Montgomery | |

=== Television ===
| Year | Title | Role | Notes |
|---|---|---|---|
| 1982–1986 | Ryan's Hope | Siobhan Ryan | Contract role |
| 1986 | Spenser: For Hire | Nancy Kettering | Episode: "An Eye for an Eye" |
| 1987 | Shell Game | Natalie Thayer | 6 episodes |
| 1987 | Matlock | Laura Norwood | Episode: "The Gambler" |
| 1988–1991 | China Beach | Karen Charlene Koloski | Main role |
| 1990 | Blind Vengeance | Virginia Whitelaw | TV movie |
| 1991 | Tales from the Crypt | Vicky | Episode: "Deadline" |
| 1991 | The Hidden Room | Jane | Episode: "A Friend in Need" |
| 1991 | Death Dreams | Crista Westfield | TV movie |
| 1992 | In Sickness and in Health | Mickey | TV movie |
| 1992 | Through the Eyes of a Killer | Laurie Fisher | TV movie |
| 1993 | Partners | Georgeanne Bidwell | TV movie |
| 1993 | The Tommyknockers | Roberta "Bobbi" Anderson | Miniseries |
| 1993 | Fallen Angels | Eve Cressy | Episode: "I'll Be Waiting" |
| 1993 | The Seduction of John Hearn | Debbie Banister | TV movie |
| 1994 | Keys | Maureen Kickasola | TV movie |
| 1994 | Lie Down with Lions | Kate Nessen | TV movie |
| 1994 | Where Are My Children? | Vanessa Meyer Vernon Scott | TV movie |
| 1995 | The Larry Sanders Show | Susan Elliot | Episode: "Nothing Personal" |
| 1995 | Inflammable | Kay Dolan | TV movie |
| 1996 | ER | Karen Hines | 5 episodes |
| 1997 | Murder Live! | Pia Postman | TV movie |
| 1997 | Gold Coast | Karen DiCilia | TV movie |
| 1998 | Giving Up the Ghost | Anna Hobson | TV movie |
| 1998 | Thanks of a Grateful Nation | Jerrilynn Folz | TV movie |
| 1999 | Happy Face Murders | Jen Powell | TV movie |
| 2000 | Frasier | Emily | Episode: "Out with Dad" |
| 2000 | Perfect Murder, Perfect Town | Patsy Ramsey | TV movie |
| 2000–2012 & 2013 | CSI: Crime Scene Investigation | Catherine Willows | Main role |
| 2004 | King of the Hill | Mrs. Hanover (voice) | Episode: "Hank's Back" |
| 2014 | Intelligence | Lilian Strand | Main role |
| 2015 | Under the Dome | Christine Price | Recurring role |
| 2015 | CSI: Immortality | FBI S.S.A. Catherine Willows | TV movie |
| 2017 | Hell's Kitchen | Herself | Guest diner/Stand Up to Cancer controbutor; Episode: "Aerial Maneuvers" |
| 2019–2022 | All Rise | Judge Lisa Benner | Main role |
| 2022–2024 | CSI: Vegas | Catherine Willows | Main role (seasons 2 & 3) |
| 2026 | Boston Blue | Gwen Silver | Recurring role (season 2) |

=== Video games ===
| Year | Title | Role | Notes |
|---|---|---|---|
| 2003 | CSI: Crime Scene Investigation | Catherine Willows | |
| 2004 | CSI: Dark Motives | Catherine Willows | |

== Awards and nominations ==
| Association | Year | Category | Title | Result | Ref |
|---|---|---|---|---|---|
| AARP Movies for Grownups Awards | 2005 | Best Grownup Love Story (shared with Dennis Quaid) | In Good Company | Nominated | |
| Blockbuster Entertainment Awards | 2001 | Favorite Supporting Actress – Drama | Erin Brockovich | Nominated | |
| Golden Globe Awards | 1991 | Best Supporting Actress in a Series, Miniseries or Motion Picture Made for Television | China Beach | Nominated | |
| Golden Globe Awards | 2002 | Best Actress in a Television Series – Drama | CSI: Crime Scene Investigation | Nominated | |
| Golden Globe Awards | 2003 | Best Actress in a Television Series – Drama | CSI: Crime Scene Investigation | Nominated | |
| Online Film & Television Association | 2001 | Best Actress in a New Drama Series | CSI: Crime Scene Investigation | Won | |
| People's Choice Awards | 2005 | Favorite Female TV Performer | CSI: Crime Scene Investigation | Won | |
| Primetime Emmy Awards | 1990 | Outstanding Supporting Actress in a Drama Series | China Beach | Won | |
| Primetime Emmy Awards | 1991 | Outstanding Supporting Actress in a Drama Series | China Beach | Nominated | |
| Primetime Emmy Awards | 1992 | Outstanding Supporting Actress in a Drama Series | China Beach | Nominated | |
| Primetime Emmy Awards | 2001 | Outstanding Lead Actress in a Drama Series | CSI: Crime Scene Investigation | Nominated | |
| Primetime Emmy Awards | 2003 | Outstanding Lead Actress in a Drama Series | CSI: Crime Scene Investigation | Nominated | |
| Satellite Awards | 2002 | Best Actress in a Series – Drama | CSI: Crime Scene Investigation | Nominated | |
| Screen Actors Guild Awards | 2002 | Outstanding Performance by an Ensemble in a Drama Series | CSI: Crime Scene Investigation | Nominated | |
| Screen Actors Guild Awards | 2003 | Outstanding Performance by an Ensemble in a Drama Series | CSI: Crime Scene Investigation | Nominated | |
| Screen Actors Guild Awards | 2004 | Outstanding Performance by an Ensemble in a Drama Series | CSI: Crime Scene Investigation | Nominated | |
| Screen Actors Guild Awards | 2005 | Outstanding Performance by an Ensemble in a Drama Series | CSI: Crime Scene Investigation | Won | |
| TV Guide Awards | 2001 | Actress of the Year in a New Series | CSI: Crime Scene Investigation | Nominated | |
| Viewers for Quality Television Awards | 1989 | Best Supporting Actress in a Quality Drama Series | China Beach | Won | |
| Viewers for Quality Television Awards | 1990 | Best Supporting Actress in a Quality Drama Series | China Beach | Won | |
| Viewers for Quality Television Awards | 1991 | Best Supporting Actress in a Quality Drama Series | China Beach | Won | |

== See also ==
- List of stars on the Hollywood Walk of Fame
