= Sunny Mabrey =

American actress (born 1975/1976)

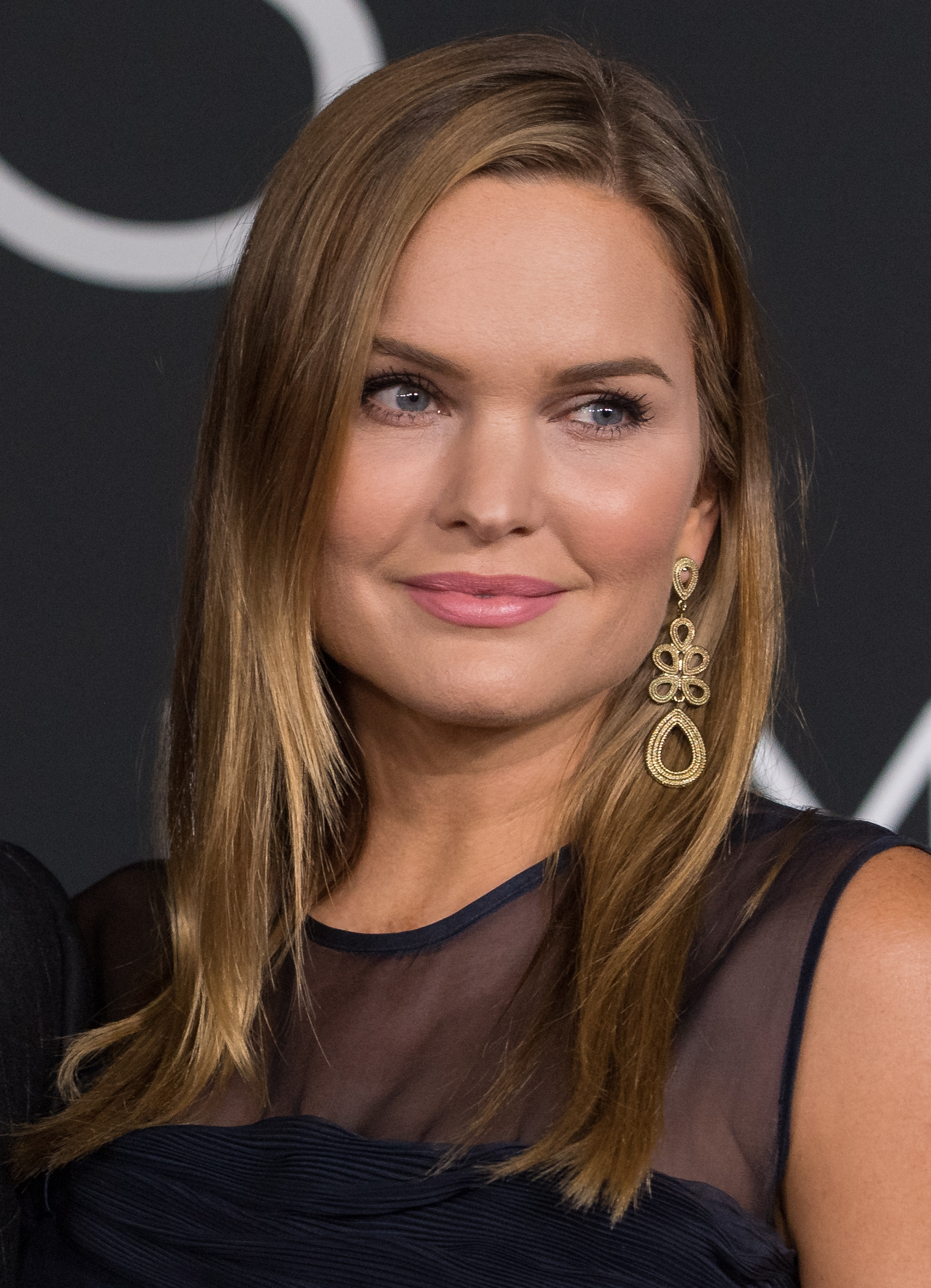
- Mabrey in 2018
- Born: 1975/1976 (age 50–51)
- Occupations: Actress; model
- Years active: 1998–present
- Spouses: Ethan Embry (m. 2005; div. 2012) (m. 2015)

Sunny Mabrey (born 1975/1976) is an American actress. Prior to debuting in films, Mabrey appeared in music videos, such as "Nookie" from Limp Bizkit. Her breakthrough came after she played the lead role, man-eating alien Sara, in Species III (2004), supporting antagonist Charlie Mayweather in XXX: State of the Union (2005) and flight attendant Tiffany in Snakes on a Plane (2006).

== Career ==
She started her career as a fashion model at age 18. She performed in commercials for The Gap. She appeared in the music video for the Lonestar song "Amazed" in 1999.

She made her television debut in 1998, appearing in an episode of LateLine. She made her feature film debut in a supporting role in the 2002 teen comedy film The New Guy. In 2004, Mabrey starred in the science fiction made-for-television film Species III, the third installment of the Species franchise.

Mabrey appeared in feature films XXX: State of the Union (2005), One Last Thing... (2005), Snakes on a Plane (2006) and Not Since You (2009). On television, Mabrey guest-starred on CSI: Miami, House, Desperate Housewives, Mad Men and The Closer. She had the recurring roles in the Lifetime drama series The Client List and the ABC fantasy series, Once Upon a Time, playing Glinda.

Mabrey later had a leading role in the science-fiction film Teleios (2017) and co-starred in the drama film Hillbilly Elegy (2020). In 2023, she had a recurring role in the CW series Gotham Knights.

== Personal life ==
Mabrey married actor Ethan Embry on July 17, 2005. Mabrey filed for divorce seven years later on July 25, 2012, citing irreconcilable differences. The two maintained some contact through Mabrey's weekly contact with Embry's young son from his first marriage, which led to the couple dating again, until they remarried in June 2015. In November 2006, Mabrey and Embry were robbed at gunpoint in their driveway. Both Mabrey and Embry performed on the short-lived television series Gotham Knights.

As of September 2014, she was creatively active on the since-closed video app Vine, on which she had over one million followers.

== Filmography ==
=== Film ===
Year	Title	Role	Notes
2002	The New Guy	Courtney	
2002	A Midsummer Night's Rave	Mia	
2005	XXX: State of the Union	Charlie Mayweather	
2005	One Last Thing...	Nikki Sinclaire	
2006	Snakes on a Plane	Tiffany	
2008	San Saba	Claire	
2008	Redirecting Eddie	Oliver's Boardwalk Woman	
2009	Not Since You	Victoria Gary	
2010	Repo	Jackie	
2012	The Child	Carina Freitag	
2014	Teacher of the Year	Kate Carter	
2016	Holiday Breakup	Spaghetti Girl	
2016	Teleios (Beyond the Trek)	Iris Duncan	Best Actress – International Independent Film Awards
2020	Hillbilly Elegy	young Bonnie Vance	

=== Television ===
Year	Title	Role	Notes
1998	LateLine	Inga	Episode: "Gale Gets a Life"
2002	Angel	Allison	Episode: "Provider"
2003	CSI: Miami	Celine Wilcox	Episode: "Extreme"
2004	Species III	Sara	Television film
2005	House	Jenny	Episode: "Control"
2006	Windfall	Jill	Episode: "Running with the Devil"
2007	Final Approach	Sela Jameson	Television film
2007	Without a Trace	Keira Jennings	Episode: "Fight/Flight"
2008	Monk	Sister Sally	Episode: "Mr. Monk Joins a Cult"
2008	Desperate Housewives	Marisa Mayer	Episode: "Opening Doors"
2009	Rules of Engagement	Erika	Episode: "Sex Toy Story"
2009	Mad Men	Shelly	Episode: "Out of Town"
2010	Memphis Beat	Alex	3 episodes
2012	In Plain Sight	Stacy Arnett / Stacy Wilson	Episode: "The Merry Wives of Witsec"
2012	The Closer	Audrey Rangel	Episode: "Fool's Gold"
2012	Vegas	Jodie Kent	Episode: Pilot
2012	Holiday High School Reunion	Tory Feldman	Television film
2013	The Trainer	Alex	Television film
2013	The Client List	Lisa Munsey	3 episodes
2013	The Glades	Cindy Pavlin	Episode: "Three's Company"
2014	Once Upon a Time	Glinda the Good Witch of the South	2 episodes
2014	SHFTY: Super Happy Fun Time, Yay!	Gwenda / Russian Prostitute	Episodes: "Couch Boyfriend", "Bear Cop"
2014	Llama Cop	Irina Foley	Episode: "Llaw and Order"
2014	Reckless	Cathy Benjamin	Episode: "Parting Shots"
2016	Parental Indiscretion	Eilzabeth	2 episodes
2016	Still the King	Allison	2 episodes
2016	A Bunch of Dicks	Billie	Miniseries
2017	Escaping Dad	Erin	Television film; originally titled Amber Alert
2017	The Jimmy Star Show with Ron Russell	Herself	Episode: "Sunny Mabrey"
2017	The Librarians	Fortuna	Episode: "And the Steal of Fortune"
2017	Typical Rick	Annabelle	Episode: "Southern Uncomfort"
2017	In the Rough	Holly Sanders	7 episodes
2018	The Perfect Mother	Stella Marshall	Television film; also known as Almost Perfect
2018	The Wrong Patient	Dr. Katie Jones	Television film; also known as A Body to Die For and Killer Body
2019	Christmas at Graceland: Home for the Holidays	Maggie Ellis	Television film
2021	MacGyver	Recruiter	Episode: "SOS + Hazmat + Ultrasound + Frequency + Malihini"
2022	Cobra Kai	Elizabeth-Anne Rooney	Episode: "Extreme Measures"
2023	Gotham Knights	Crystal Brown	3 episodes
2025	Will Trent	Francesca Sovrano	Episode: "Find a New Pond"
2026	The Night Agent	Sandrine	Episode: "Call Waiting"
2026	Cape Fear	Trish	2 episodes
TBA	Ginny & Georgia †	Daisy	Recurring (season 4)

=== Music videos ===
Year	Title	Artist(s)
1999	"Nookie"	Limp Bizkit
1999	"Amazed"	Lonestar
2014	"Just Girly Things"	Dawin
