= Natasha Henstridge =

Canadian actress (born 1974)

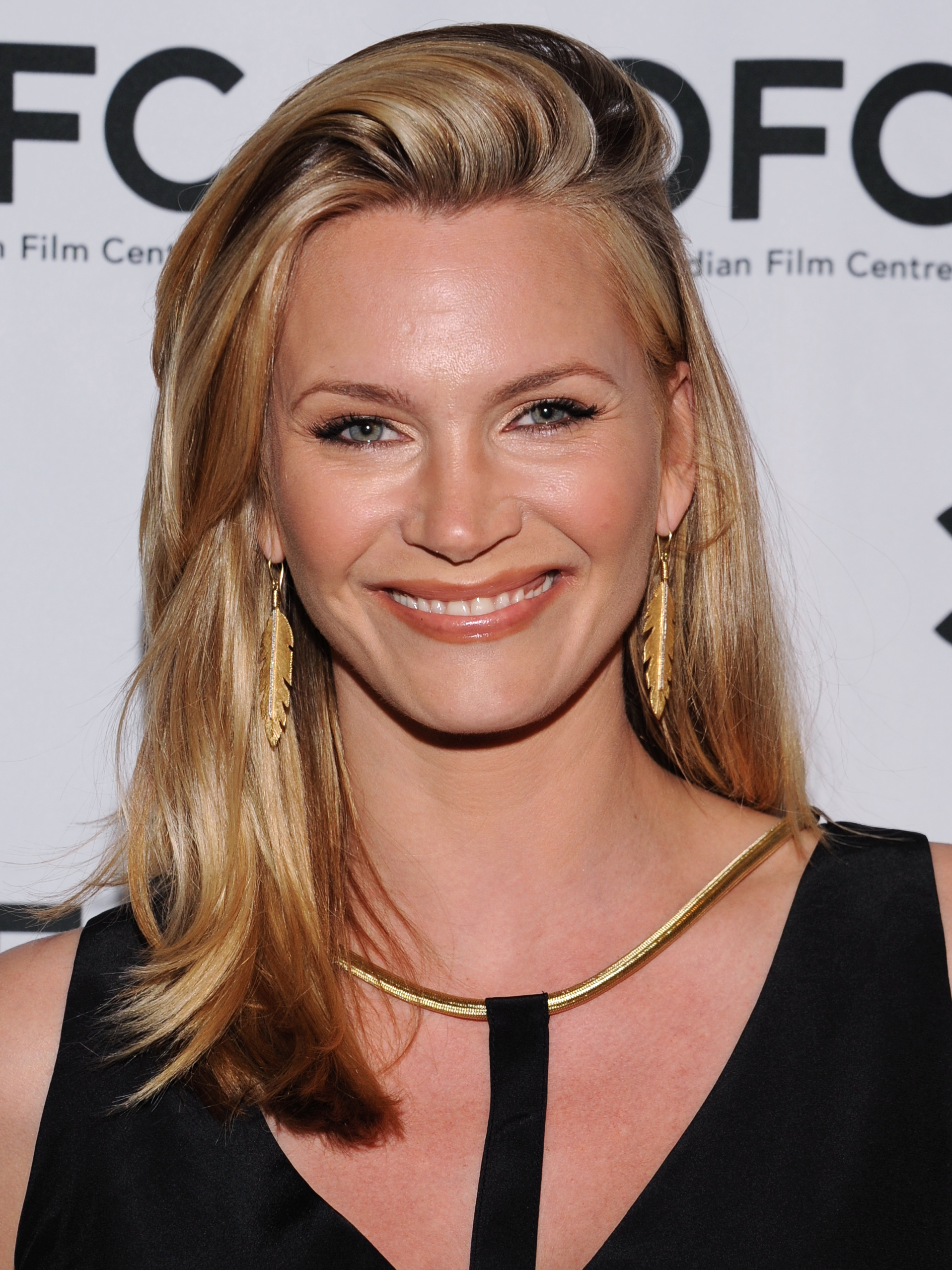
- Henstridge in 2012
- Born: Natasha Tonya Henstridge; August 15, 1974 (age 52); Springdale, Newfoundland and Labrador, Canada
- Occupation: Actress
- Years active: 1989–present
- Spouses: Damian Chapa (m. 1995; div. 1996); Darius Campbell (m. 2011; div. 2018)
- Partner: Liam Waite (1996–2004)
- Children: 2

Natasha Tonya Henstridge (born August 15, 1974) is a Canadian actress. In 1995, she rose to prominence with her debut role in the science-fiction horror film Species, followed by performances in Species II and Species III. She has since starred in a string of films and television series, including Maximum Risk (1996), The Whole Nine Yards (2000), The Whole Ten Yards (2004), Ghosts of Mars (2001), She Spies (2002–2004), Eli Stone (2008–2009), and Would Be Kings (2008). For the latter, she won the Gemini Award for Best Actress. From 2019 until 2022, she starred in the CBC Television series Diggstown.

== Early life ==
Henstridge was born in Springdale, Newfoundland and Labrador, on August 15, 1974, to Helen Henstridge, a homemaker, and Brian Henstridge, a construction manager and business owner. She was raised in Fort McMurray, Alberta, with her younger brother, Shane.

At age 14, Henstridge entered the Casablanca Modeling Agency's Look of the Year contest and was chosen first runner-up. The following year, she went to Paris to pursue her modeling ambitions. At age 15, she was featured on her first magazine cover, the French edition of Cosmopolitan. Several more magazine covers followed and Henstridge filmed television commercials for products such as Olay, Old Spice, and Lady Stetson. With her modeling career established, Henstridge decided she preferred acting. One of her first roles was as Foxy Fox in the Missoula Children's Theater production of Snow White and the seven Dwarfs staged in Fort McMurray.

== Career ==
=== Film ===
In her film debut Species (1995), Henstridge played Sil, a genetically engineered alien/human hybrid created from a message received by SETI. When she escapes the laboratory where she is held for observation, a team of experts is assembled to track and capture her. Sil embarks on a killing spree while discovering her powerful instinct to mate, which would result in her offspring being a threat to mankind.

Species was an instant hit, making US$113 million at the box office. Notable for its sexual content, the film won Henstridge the MTV Movie Award for Best Kiss for a scene in which Sil, while kissing an abusive date, impales his head with her tongue. In 1998, she played Eve, a more ambiguous genetic duplicate of Sil, in Species II, a box office failure. Between Species films, Henstridge starred in two action films in 1996, Adrenalin: Fear the Rush with Christopher Lambert and Maximum Risk opposite Jean-Claude Van Damme.

A few smaller independent movies followed, including Bela Donna and Dog Park, with varied box-office returns. Henstridge also starred in The Whole Nine Yards (2000) and its sequel The Whole Ten Yards (2004). Despite having some reservations about the science-fiction genre, she signed up for John Carpenter's Ghosts of Mars (2001) in the lead role of Lieutenant Melanie Ballard. The film was not well received, with a 20% rating on Rotten Tomatoes. In 2004, she briefly appeared as Eve in Species III.

In 2007, Henstridge was a festival judge at the first annual Noor Iranian Film Festival.

=== Television ===
Henstridge has played a number of roles on television, for example in Caracara and The Outer Limits. From 2005 to 2006, she had a recurring role as the speaker's chief of staff on the ABC drama Commander in Chief, which starred Geena Davis as a U.S. president. She also hosted Mostly True Stories: Urban Legends Revealed on TLC, a show about urban legends. She guest-starred as a substitute teacher in the first-season South Park episode "Tom's Rhinoplasty", and was credited as "the chick from Species".

Henstridge appeared on the television series She Spies until its cancellation and completed a television movie for the Lifetime channel titled Widow on the Hill. In 2006, she filmed the CTV original miniseries Would Be Kings in Hamilton, Ontario, for which she won a Gemini Award. She also starred in the expansion set to the video game Command & Conquer 3: Tiberium Wars, entitled Kane's Wrath.

In 2008, Henstridge played a role on the ABC comedy-drama series Eli Stone. She has also been involved with two other productions, joining the cast of Dave Rodriguez's Anytown, an indie drama that examines a racist high-school attack and its aftermath. She has been involved with the production of Should've Been Romeo from American Independent Pictures.

In 2009, Henstridge did a guest spot on The Tonight Show with Conan O'Brien. During this, she demonstrated a Newfoundland custom called "screeching in", which involved getting O'Brien to drink Newfoundland Screech rum and kiss a large fish.

In 2011, she appeared on the season-9 finale and season-10 premiere of CSI: Miami as Renee Locklear. She then starred in the CW television series The Secret Circle as Dawn Chamberlain.

From 2019 to 2022, she starred in the CBC Television/BET+ drama series Diggstown.

== Personal life ==
Henstridge married American actor Damian Chapa in 1995; they divorced in 1996.

She dated American actor Liam Waite from 1996 to 2004; they have two sons together.

She began a relationship with Scottish singer Darius Campbell in 2004. They became engaged, but broke it off in early 2010; however, they married on Valentine's Day 2011. They filed for divorce in July 2013. The divorce was finalized in February 2018.

In June 2009, Henstridge spoke of her past use of diet pills in combination with extreme diets for weight loss; she said this damaged her metabolism and led to subsequent weight gain.

In November 2017, during the height of the #MeToo movement, Henstridge joined six other actresses in accusing director Brett Ratner of sexual assault and harassment; she maintains that he forced her to perform oral sex on him in the early 1990s. She also accused producer Harvey Weinstein of sexual harassment.

== Filmography ==
=== Film ===
Year	Title	Role	Notes
1995	Species	Sil	
1996	Adrenalin: Fear the Rush	Delon	
1996	Maximum Risk	Alex Bartlett	
1998	Standoff	Mary	
1998	Species II	Eve	
1998	Bela Donna	Donna	
1998	Dog Park	Lorna	
2000	It Had to Be You	Anna Penn	
2000	The Whole Nine Yards	Cynthia Tudeski	
2000	A Girl, Three Guys, and a Gun	5 O'Clock Girl	
2000	A Better Way to Die	Kelly	
2000	Bounce	Mimi Prager	
2000	Second Skin	Crystal Ball	
2001	Ghosts of Mars	Lt. Melanie Ballard	
2001	Kevin of the North	Bonnie Livengood	also known as Chilly Dogs
2002	Steal	Karen	
2004	The Whole Ten Yards	Cynthia Ozeransky	
2008	Deception	Simone Wilkinson	
2009	Anytown	Carol Mills	also known as American Bully
2010	Let the Game Begin	Angela	
2010	The Devil’s Teardrop	Margaret Lukas	
2013	Against the Wild	Susan Wade	Direct-to-video
2014	Anatomy of Deception	Det. Alison Briggs	
2014	Nowhere Safe	Julie Johnson	
2014	Badge of Honor	Rebecca Miles	
2014	The Christmas Gamble	Susan Wells	
2016	Home Invasion	Chloe	Direct-to-video
2016	The Bronx Bull	Sally Carlton	
2016	Inconceivable	Valerie	also known as Deadly Ex
2017	The Black Room	Jennifer	
2018	Ravers	Editor	
2019	House Red	Mary	
2021	The Unhealer	Bernice Mason	
2021	Night of the Sicario	Taylor Ward	also known as Blindsided
2021	Hero Dog: The Journey Home	Susan Wade	
2021	This Game's Called Murder	Mrs. Wallendorf	
2021	Why?	Nina	
2022	7th Secret	Olivia Divine	
2024	Cinderella's Revenge	Fairy Godmother	

=== Television ===
Year	Title	Role	Notes
1997	The Outer Limits	Emma	Episode: "Bits of Love"
1997	Homeboys in Outer Space	Zima	Episode: "Happy Happy, Droid Droid, or Amma Sees Red"
1998	South Park	Ms. Ellen (voice)	Episode: "Tom's Rhinoplasty" (credited as "The Chick from Species")
1999	The Last Witness	Rachel Sutherland	Television film
2000	Jason and the Argonauts	Hypsipyle	TV miniseries
2002	Power and Beauty	Judy Exner	Television film
2002–2004	She Spies	Cassie McBain	Main role (40 episodes)
2002–2004	Mostly True Stories?: Urban Legends Revealed	Herself/host	Documentary television series
2004	Species III	Eve	Television film
2005	Widow on the Hill	Linda Dupree Cavanaugh	Television film
2005–2006	Commander in Chief	Jayne Murray	Recurring role (16 episodes)
2007	Shark	Nicolette Ross	Episode: "Fall from Grace"
2008	Would Be Kings		TV Mini-Series (2 episodes)
2008–2009	Eli Stone	Taylor Wethersby	Main role (26 episodes)
2009	Impact	Dr. Maddie Rhodes	TV miniseries
2009–2010	Time Jumper	Charity Vyle (voice)	Main role (10 episodes)
2010	You Lucky Dog	Lisa Rayborn	Television film
2010	The Devil's Teardrop	Margaret Lukas	Television film
2010	Drop Dead Diva	Claire Harrison	Episodes: "Bad Girls", "Freeze the Day"
2011	The Perfect Student	Nicole Johnson	Television film
2011	CSI: Miami	Agent Renee Locklear	Episodes: "Mayday", "Countermeasures"
2011–2012	The Secret Circle	Dawn Chamberlain	Main role (21 episodes)
2012	A Christmas Song	Diana	Television film
2013	Cold Spring	Sara	Television film
2013	Against the Wild	Susan Wade	Television film
2013	A Sister's Nightmare	Cassidy Rydert	Television film
2014	Republic of Doyle	Inspector Valerie O'Brien	Episodes: "Expansion", "Buried", "True Lies"
2014	Selfie	Mrs. Saperstein	Episodes: "Pilot", "Never Block Cookies", "- Even Hell Has Two Bars"
2014	Hawaii Five-0	Caroline Porter	Episode: "Ka Makuakane (Family Man)"
2015	Beauty & the Beast	Carol Hall	3 episodes
2016	Ice Girls	Rose	TV movie
2016	Summer in the City	Kendall	TV movie
2017	Medinah	Salma	6 episodes
2019–2022	Diggstown	Colleen	11 episodes
2026	Fallout	Joan	Episode: "The Handoff"
2026	Below	Jan Hicks	
