= Cinema of Botswana =

Overview of cinema and film production in Botswana

Film in Botswana
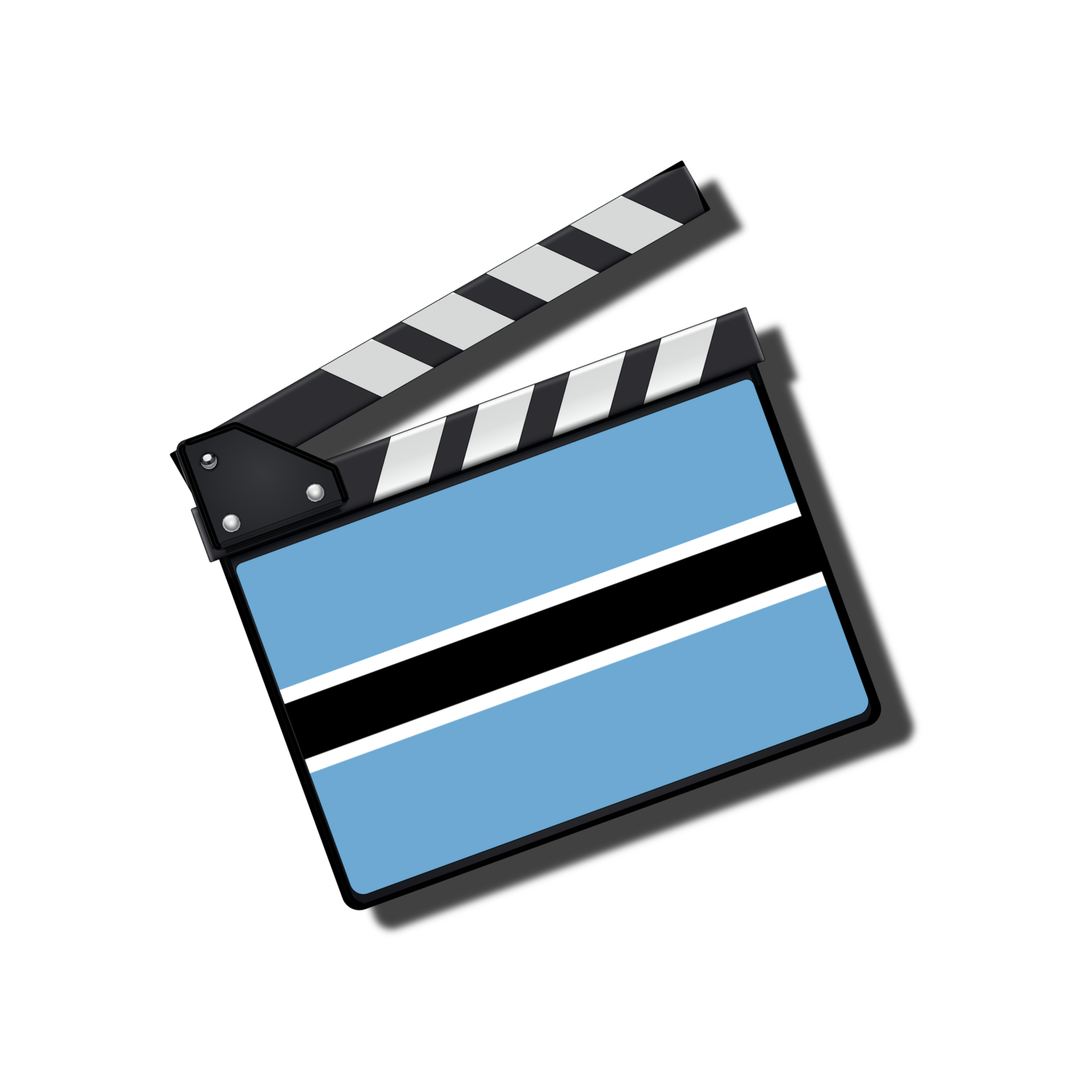
- Nickname: Botswood
- Country: Botswana
- Earliest film: Bechuanaland Railways documentary (1906–1907)
- National broadcaster: Botswana Television (BTV)
- Major festivals: Bantu Film Festival; Botswana International Film Festival
- Industry bodies: Women in Film Guild Botswana; Government Film Office (Ministry of Youth, Gender, Sport and Culture)
- Notable films: The No. 1 Ladies' Detective Agency (2008); A United Kingdom (2016); Zombie Date Night in Tlokweng (2023)
- Notable figures: Lawrence Lekolwane; Lesedi Mphothwe; Moreetsi Gabang

Film in Botswana covers the history of cinema and screen production in Botswana, from the earliest surviving footage of the Bechuanaland territory in the early twentieth century to the emergence of a locally-led film industry in the 2010s and 2020s. The local industry has been nicknamed Botswood by some practitioners and observers, drawing a parallel to Bollywood, Nollywood, and Hollywood.

== Earliest recorded footage (1906 to 1940s) ==
According to film historian Neil Parsons, the earliest surviving film recorded in what is now Botswana dates to between 1906 and 1907. A London-based company owned by Charlie Urban sent cameramen to document the Bechuanaland Railways journey to Victoria Falls. The Austrian ethnographer Rudolf Pöch subsequently came to Botswana and made a series of short films incorporating sound and colour, including footage of a man named Kubi, whom Parsons has described as the first Botswana film star.

In 1912, a Londoner named W. Butcher filmed a march by Bangwato regiments in Serowe. Documentary production of the territory continued between the two World Wars, largely focused on the peoples of the western region and newsreel coverage of events in the east.

The first filmmaker from Botswana is reported to have been Molefi Pilane, a local tribal chief who used a small recording camera. A woman known as Miss Murchison recorded approximately two hours of film documenting the operations of the African Auxiliary Pioneers Corps, of which two parts are known to survive.

The wartime film Bechuanaland Protectorate, made during the Second World War, depicted APC soldiers returning home from North Africa and featured tribal chief Bathoen II.

In 1947, Cape Town filmmaker Bill Lewis came to film the Royal visit to a former APC soldiers' farm. American filmmaker Tom Larson arrived in the late 1940s and made two documentaries, including Rainmakers of the Okavango (1948).

Botswana drew international newsreel coverage from 1949 onward following the marriage of Seretse Khama to Ruth Williams, a political controversy because of regional Apartheid laws. At least 21 newsreel clips covering events from 1949 to 1956 survive. Production companies including Paramount Pictures and Universal News made films about the couple.

== 1950s and early local production ==
The 1953 film Remnants of a Dying Race, produced by Molepolole resident Louis Knobel for the South African Information Services, documented the lives of the San people on the Kalahari desert. The Hunters (1957), produced by American filmmaker John Marshall, covered the same community, as did the BBC series The Lost World of the Kalahari, featuring South African presenter Laurens van der Post. These films were produced by outsiders for foreign audiences and gave the territory screen visibility while framing its indigenous populations as ethnographic subjects rather than contemporary actors.

Botswana gained its independence in 1966, bringing political, social, and cultural changes to the country, including how films were produced and distributed.

In 1980, John Marshall filmed N!ai, the Story of a !Kung Woman, about the struggles of a !Kung woman named N!ai, who was forcibly married at age eight to a tribal healer.

== The Gods Must Be Crazy and international productions (1980s to 1990s) ==
The 1981 comedy The Gods Must Be Crazy, set in Botswana, became a major international hit and spawned one official sequel and several unofficial ones. The Gods Must Be Crazy II (1988) was also commercially successful, with both films making Namibian actor Nǃxau ǂToma a well-known star internationally. Crazy Safari (1991), the first of three unofficial sequels produced by a Hong Kong-based company, also starred Nǃxau ǂToma.

Disney's 2000 production Whispers: An Elephant's Tale was filmed in Botswana, starring Angela Bassett. Parts of the Tamil-language action film Ayan (2009) were also recorded in Botswana.

== Wildlife film industry ==
Botswana's natural environment, particularly the Okavango Delta, Chobe, and the Makgadikgadi Pans, attracted wildlife documentary filmmakers from the mid-twentieth century onward. The American program Mutual of Omaha's Wild Kingdom filmed in Botswana on several occasions during the 1960s. Dereck and Beverly Joubert produced prize-winning wildlife films for international television channels including National Geographic, and Tim and June Liversedge produced the lion documentary Roar!, shown on IMAX screens internationally. This strand of production created an international image of Botswana's landscapes but did not generate significant local industry capacity or employment for Batswana filmmakers.

== Botswana Television and the first local content era (2000s) ==
Botswana Television (BTV) launched in July 2000 as the national broadcaster and became the primary platform through which local screen content reached domestic audiences. Local drama and magazine productions began supplying the channel from the mid-2000s onward.

One of the earliest productions to draw public attention and controversy was the BTV drama Thokolosi (2006), which depicted witchcraft in a village called Bobonong. The series prompted public controversy, with some viewers from Bobonong accusing it of being prejudiced against their community. The creators defended it as an educational work intended to encourage debate about censorship and cultural representation.

In 2009, Rradijo, a direct-to-video comedy series starring Radikgang Mandiane as the title character, launched and sold 150,000 units across Botswana and South Africa, demonstrating that locally made content had a viable commercial market.

Lawrence Lekolwane of Botswood Studios was among the first professional filmmakers to build a sustained body of work across television drama, documentary, and feature film in Botswana. He began his career in 2003 as a scriptwriter and researcher on the Radio Botswana 2 drama Makgabaneng, and produced television series including Flat 101 (M-Net Africa Magic, 2004), Botshelo Jo (BTV, YTV, and Africa Magic, from 2012), and the feature films Mpho le Mphonyana (2014), Pelo e ja Serati (2015), and The President's Daughter (2018). Botswood Studios secured a multi-year contract with BTV for Botshelo Jo, making it one of the country's most established locally produced drama series. His short film Nazara won the Best Film Gold Award in 2021.

== The No. 1 Ladies' Detective Agency (2007 to 2009) ==
The joint BBC and HBO production of The No. 1 Ladies' Detective Agency, based on Alexander McCall Smith's internationally bestselling novel series, was the first major international production to be filmed in Botswana. The project began as a potential theatrical feature film. Director Anthony Minghella, a fan of the books, optioned the film rights in the early 2000s, and producer Amy J. Moore, who had extensive experience in African film and had visited Botswana extensively, was pivotal in convincing him to shoot on location.

Botswana had no film infrastructure and no rebate system at the time, making it an expensive choice. Moore addressed the Botswana Parliament directly to argue for government support. The government agreed, funding more than 30 percent of the pilot, which cost between $5 million and $7 million, on the condition that at least a third of the cast were Batswana and that the entire production was shot in the country. A mini-studio nicknamed Kgalewood was built at the foot of Kgale Hill in Gaborone to house the set. Production on the pilot began on 2 July 2007, and the pilot broadcast on the BBC on 23 March 2008. A six-episode series followed on both the BBC and HBO in 2009.

The production employed more than 2,300 people, including 1,900 extras, and ran an internship program of over 100 students from local colleges and media schools. By the time of the series, many of the same locally trained workers were running three departments of the production. Alexander McCall Smith described the production as an opportunity for local people to gain real filmmaking skills.

The series was not renewed for a second season, and the Kgalewood set was subsequently left to deteriorate rather than being developed as a tourism attraction as had been planned.

== A United Kingdom (2016) ==
A United Kingdom (2016), directed by Amma Asante, dramatized the true story of Seretse Khama and Ruth Williams, whose interracial marriage in 1948 defied both British colonial pressure and the apartheid-era South African government. The film starred David Oyelowo and Rosamund Pike and was produced by Pathé and the BBC. While it drew on Botswana's political history and was the country's most prominent international film credit of the 2010s, it was filmed primarily in the United Kingdom, South Africa, and Zimbabwe rather than in Botswana itself.

== Local television drama (2010s) ==
Colours is an urban drama series of 26 episodes, commissioned in 2016 and premiering on 10 October 2018. Set in the Gaborone metropolis and Ramotswa, it addresses drug abuse, HIV/AIDS, and youth waywardness. The series follows Tirelo, a young man struggling to follow through on his commitments in life. The series later reached South African audiences through broadcast on a regional platform.

== Growth of local production infrastructure (2010s) ==
A government Film Office was established under the Ministry of Youth, Gender, Sport and Culture with a mandate to develop and commercialize film and television production across Botswana's districts. The office runs a district short film screening program and a funding scheme through which scripts from across the country are selected and supported at P60,000 each. By 2021, it had received 168 full program series since its inception. It also began hosting an annual international film festival, with the first edition taking place in 2023 and drawing participants from Zimbabwe, Zambia, Nigeria, South Africa, and Namibia. Speakers at that festival called for the establishment of a dedicated Film Commission, noting that over 350 countries worldwide have dedicated film commissions and that Botswana had not yet created one.

AFDA Botswana, the local branch of the South African film and performing arts school, has trained several of the country's working professional filmmakers. Graduates with feature-level credits include Lawrence Lekolwane and Lesedi Mphothwe.

The 2024 cultural exchange program Logaga lwa Ditiragalo (meaning "exchange of cultures") was produced in Botswana, aiming to preserve and revive traditional cultural practices and promote understanding among different ethnic groups.

== International recognition ==
=== Moreetsi Gabang and NEFTI Africa (2023) ===
Director Moreetsi Gabang of Mainane Studios won both the NEFTI Africa Best Film Award ($5,000) and the Audience Choice Award ($2,000) at the Durban FilmMart in July 2023, for his short horror-comedy Zombie Date Night in Tlokweng. The film tells the story of a couple whose date night is interrupted when a roommate returns home from a religious service possessed by a demonic spirit, drawing on the Batlokwa people's tradition of burying their deceased within residential plots as its premise. Gabang became the first Botswana director to win the NEFTI Africa competition, which is judged by international film industry figures including actress Vivica A. Fox, Academy Award-winning producer Bruce Cohen, and Disney Post-Production President Ted Gagliano. The cast included South African actor Marcus Mabusela and Botswana comedian William Last KRM.

=== Mzansi Magic premiere (2025) ===
In November 2025, three Botswana feature films premiered on the pan-African channel Mzansi Magic through a partnership with MultiChoice Botswana: Route 2 (directed by Afentse Fenny Lekolwane), Abashwe (directed by Johnson Otlaadisa), and The Prophet (directed by Tumelo Chaba). The premiere marked the first time Botswana-produced feature films appeared on a continent-wide pay television platform.

== Film festivals ==
=== Bantu Film Festival ===
The Bantu Film Festival, co-founded by filmmaker Lesedi Mphothwe through Butterscotch Productions, is an independent pan-African film festival held annually in Gaborone since 2022. The festival combines African film screenings with workshops, masterclasses, and panel discussions. The third edition in October 2024 was held at New Capitol Cinema, Riverwalk, and the University of Botswana under the theme Unifying Africa through Cinema, presenting 30 films from multiple African countries including three from Botswana. The opening film was the local horror short Seipone, directed by Princess Mokokwe and Wazwagwa Ntabeni. Sponsors have included the Okavango Diamond Company. International partners have included the Namibia Film Commission, the Ladima Foundation, Human Rights Tattoo, and the University of Botswana.

=== Botswana International Film Festival ===
The government Film Office began hosting an annual international film festival, with the first edition taking place in 2023. The festival drew participants from Zimbabwe, Zambia, Nigeria, South Africa, and Namibia, and served as a platform for industry discussions including calls for the establishment of a dedicated national Film Commission.

== Women in Film Botswana ==
The Women in Film Guild Botswana (WIF Botswana) was established in 2021 by women who had graduated from film-related programmes and found no support structure for women already working in the sector. Co-founders include Nikita Mokgware and Serena Mmifinyana. WIF Botswana attended the Cannes Film Festival in 2023, partly funded by a donation from Female Invest whose representatives the co-chairs had met at the Forbes 30 Under 30 summit. The organisation has served as an official partner for the Bantu Film Festival and has supported members in building professional IMDb profiles. Member Lebogang Mpofu was appointed as the Botswana coordinator for the Afro International Film Market and Festival.

Lesedi Mphothwe, as Festival Director of the Bantu Film Festival and founder of Butterscotch Productions, has served as a juror for the Mpumalanga International Film Festival and the U.S. Documentary Residency in Botswana, and is a member of the Global Impact Producers Alliance. Her short film Cell 10 (2022) received four international festival selections.

== Cinema companies ==
Botswana has a number of cinema and movie theatre companies, including New Capitol Cinemas and Gaborone Cine Centre.

== See also ==
- Bantu Film Festival
- Lesedi Mphothwe
- Lawrence Lekolwane
- Moreetsi Gabang
- Women in Film Guild Botswana
- Botswana Television
- National Arts Council of Botswana
- The No. 1 Ladies' Detective Agency (TV series)
- A United Kingdom (film)
- List of Botswana actors
