= Joe Gulla =

American playwright, actor, and reality television participant

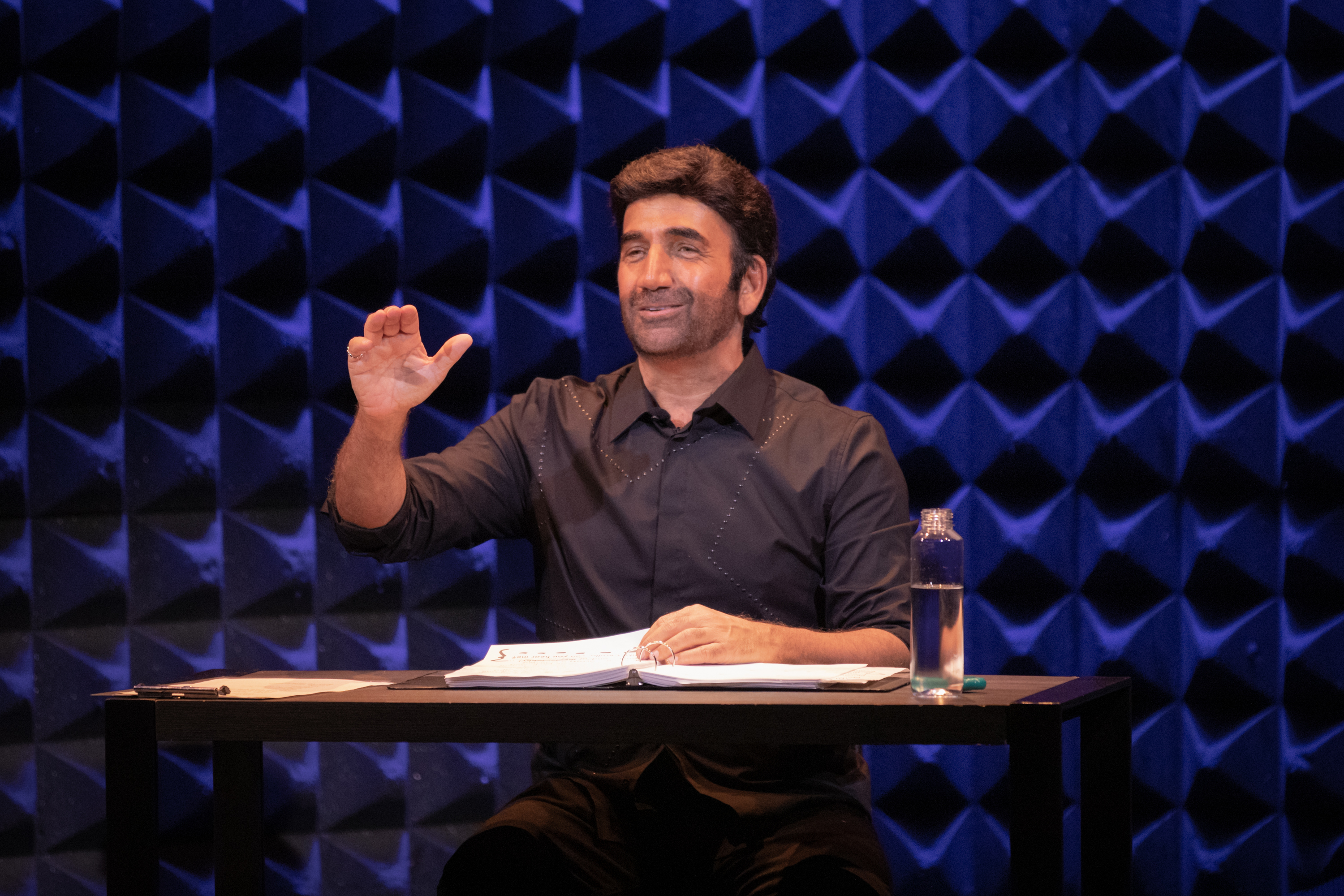
- Joe's Pub at The Public Theater Performance
- Born: Joseph Santo Gulla; July 23; Bronx, New York
- Writing career
- Notable works: Garbo, Bronx Queen Trilogy, The Bronx Queen, Faggy at 50, Daddy, Reel Wood, Knock Off!, Gay.Porn.Mafia, Christmas Caroline, Gayfever, Fall and Rise, Sleeping With The Fish, My Darling Love, Members Only

Joe Gulla (born July 23, 1964) is an American playwright, actor and reality television participant. He is best known for the autobiographical monologues that he writes and performs for the theater. He is a regular performer at Feinstein's/54 Below and Joe's Pub at The Public Theater. An award-winning playwright, his plays have been performed Off-Broadway, nationally and internationally.

== Biography ==
=== Early life ===
Gulla is a native of Bronx, New York and grew up in the Morris Park neighborhood. He is a 1982 graduate of Cardinal Spellman High School. Upon graduation, he attended the State University at Albany, but eventually transferred to Fordham University at Rose Hill. His post-graduate work includes study at Fordham University and Circle Repertory in New York City.

=== Career ===
Gulla is a regular performer at Feinstein's/54 Below and Joe's Pub at The Public Theater. His play, "My Darling Love" won the 2019 Christopher Hewitt Award for Drama. His plays, "The Bronx Queen", "Garbo" and "Gay.Porn.Mafia" won the 2016, 2017 and 2018 NYC Downtown Urban Arts Festival "Audience Award", respectively. As an actor, Joe performed in San Francisco's "Tony & Tina's Wedding" for many years and Off-Broadway's "My Big Gay Italian Wedding". He also starred on NBC's LOST, one of television's first adventure reality series. His best known work, Bronx Queen Trilogy is based on his experience growing up as a gay boy in the Bronx.The Bronx Queen, first in the series, won the 2016 Downtown Urban Arts Festival "Audience Award" for Gulla's sold-out performance at Joe's Pub at The Public Theater."The Bronx Queen" was also awarded Best Comedic Script and Most Popular Show at NYC Theater Row's 2012 and 2013 United Solo Theatre Festival, respectively.Faggy at 50, second in the series, was awarded Best One-Man Show at NYC Theater Row's 2014 United Solo Theatre Festival.Daddy, the series' final installment had its World Premiere at NYC Theater Row's 2015 United Solo Theatre Festival. Gulla won the 2015 United Solo Award for Best Comedian for his performance.

REEL WOOD, a short play written by Gulla, had its World Premiere at the Hollywood Fringe Festival in June 2015. It was also selected by NYC's Village Playwrights to be performed in their "Re-Inventing Family" series commemorating Gay Pride. Gulla's play, Knock Off!, had its world premiere in Houston, TX at Theatre Southwest. Christmas Caroline had its World Premiere at Studio C Theatre, Hollywood, CA in November 2015. His play, Gayfever had its World Premiere at the Funky Little Theatre Company in March 2016. "Sleeping With The Fish" by Joe Gulla opened the Village Playwrights' "Gay Pride and Prejudice" series in June 2016. In June 2016, Gulla's play, Fall and Rise had its World Premiere at the Carrolwood Player's "One Act Weekend" in Tampa, Florida. Later that month, Gulla's Fall and Rise premiered at the 2016 Hollywood Fringe Festival. Fall and Rise was awarded "Best Play" in 2016 at the Acadia University Mini Fest in Nova Scotia, CN.

Gulla was a contestant on the NBC adventure reality series Lost in 2001. The show followed three teams of two as they made their way from the Gobi Desert in Mongolia back to the United States. He played the role of "Frankie" in Off-Broadway's long-running hit, My Big Gay Italian Wedding.

The Advocate named Gulla its "Anti-Bullying Hero" in 2012.

In April 2025, Gulla published his memoir Last August: Love in the Time of Alzheimer's through Archway Publishing, an imprint of Simon & Schuster. The book chronicles his seven years as primary caregiver for his mother during her battle with Alzheimer's disease and hospice care. Gulla also narrated the audiobook edition, released through ACX and Audible. The memoir has been noted for its frank exploration of caregiving, grief, and family dynamics.

Gulla is a member of the Dramatists Guild.

=== Rome Years ===
Gulla lived in Rome, Italy from 2007 to 2010, his play Garbo was based on an unrequited love affair experienced while living there. Garbo was selected to be part of the New York City's Times Square International Theater Festival in 2012. Garbo was also produced at New York's Cherry Lane Theater as part of the 2017 Downtown Urban Arts Festival. It won the "Audience Award" for that performance.

== Original Plays (select) ==
- Garbo - 2011 (Barrow Group Theatre); 2017 (Cherry Lane Theater)
- The Bronx Queen - 2012 (Theatre Row); 2016 (Joe's Pub); 2019 (Feinstein's/54 Below)
- Faggy at 50 - 2014 (Theatre Row); 2017 (Joe's Pub); 2018 (Tabard Theatre)
- Daddy - 2015 (Theatre Row); 2018 (Joe's Pub)
- Reel Wood - 2015 (Studio C Artists); 2018 (Eclectic Theatre)
- Christmas Caroline - 2015 (Studio C Artists)
- Knock Off! - 2016 (Theatre Southwest)
- Fall and Rise - 2016 (Acadia University); 2016 (Carrollwood Players Theatre); 2016 (Studio C Artists)
- Gayfever - 2016 (Funky Little Theatre Company)
- Sleeping With The Fish - 2016 (Emerald Theatre Company); 2017 (Darkhorse Dramatists); 2017 (Vermont Pride Theater); 2019 (KIT Playwright Series); 2018 (Island City Stage)
- The Voice - 2017 (Darkhorse Dramatists)
- GAY.PORN.MAFIA - 2018 (New York Live Arts Theater)
- My Darling Love - 2019 (Emerald Theatre Company)
- Members Only - 2020 (Almost Adults Productions)

== Critical Analysis ==
Joe's solo performances are presented in the tradition of (and homage to) monologist, Spalding Gray. This artistic choice is explained in the Bistro Awards review of "The Bronx Queen". "Gulla delivered the entire show in Spalding Gray fashion: seated at a desk, reading the script aloud from a binder. At first I wondered whether this was such a great idea. Clearly Gulla knows (or nearly knows) the text by heart. But it turned out to be the right tack. There is a literary quality to Gulla's storytelling. Were he to stand center stage or wander about—speaking his "writerly" text in stream-of-consciousness, off-the-cuff fashion—the effect might seem stilted. Gulla's strengths as a performer were evident even within the limited acting sphere he allowed himself, perched behind that table. His hand gestures were simple but emphatic, giving him an authoritative quality. He modulated his somewhat raspy voice subtly to take on the roles of the various characters in the monologue, but also to give his story shape and his sentiments depth.""His performances succeed largely because Joe Gulla comes off as such a warm and wise storyteller, brimming with good will and honest reflection."

Broadway World elaborates: "Joe Gulla is a monologist in the tradition of Spalding Gray or Whoopi Goldberg or John Leguizamo. His style is simple. He sits at a desk (in this case a desk made of two music stands) and just reads. But it is story theatre of the highest order. His show THE BRONX QUEEN which opened last night at 54 Below, is about the traumatic, and often hysterical, experiences he had growing up gay in the Bronx. It is peopled with characters from his Italian family and their Puerto Rican friends. The Bronx Queen, by the way, is a fishing trawler that figures in many of the scenes. The story follows the ill-fated vessel from birth to death in a tragic accident and to eventual rescue. In short, it's a metaphor for the life of most gay kids who deal with families who love them but don't quite understand them, and about the peace and love they eventually find."

=== The Bronx Queen ===
The Bronx Queen was reviewed positively by Broadway World

== Awards and honors ==
- 2019 - My Darling Love - Christopher Hewitt Award for Drama
- 2019 - Sleeping With The Fish - Carlo Annoni Award/Special Mention
- 2019 - Reel Wood - Last Frontier Theatre Conference Selectee
- 2018 - GAY.PORN.MAFIA - Downtown Urban Arts Festival Audience Award
- 2017 - Garbo - Downtown Urban Arts Festival Audience Award
- 2016 - The Bronx Queen - Downtown Urban Arts Festival Audience Award
- 2016 - Daddy - United Solo Theatre Festival Award for Best Comedian
- 2016 - Fall and Rise - Acadia University (Nova Scotia) Award for Best Play
- 2015 - Faggy at 50 - United Solo Theatre Festival Award for Best One Man Show Script
- 2014 - The Bronx Queen - United Solo Theatre Festival Award for Most Popular Show Script
- 2013 - The Bronx Queen - United Solo Theatre Festival Award for Best Comedic Script
