= List of Botswana actors =

This is a list of actors and actresses who are from, lived in, or are otherwise connected to the country of Botswana. The list is arranged alphabetically by surname.

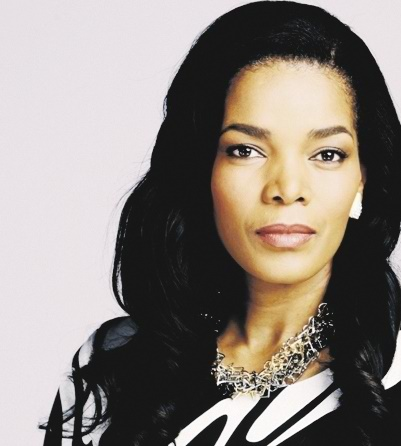
Connie Ferguson in 2017

== Botswana actors ==
- Malia Baker (born 2006)
- Connie Ferguson (born 1970)
- Shona Ferguson (1972-2021)
- Lone Motsomi (fl 2022)
- Donald Molosi (born 1985)
- Warona Setshwaelo (born 1976 or 1977)

== See also ==
- Cinema of Botswana
