= Women in Tech Accelerator Program =

Women in Tech Accelerator Programme
- Abbreviation: WiT Botswana
- Formation: 2024
- Type: Business accelerator
- Purpose: Supporting women-led technology and innovation businesses in Botswana
- Location: Gaborone, Botswana
- Parent organization: Standard Chartered Botswana; Dream Factory Foundation Botswana
- Website: Official website

The Women in Tech Accelerator Program (WiT Botswana) is a business accelerator run jointly by Standard Chartered Botswana and Dream Factory Foundation Botswana. It began in 2024 and supports women-led businesses working in technology, fintech, agritech, e-commerce, and health innovation. The program provides training, mentorship, investor connections, and seed funding, and is open to participants from both urban and rural Botswana.

== Background ==
The program is part of Standard Chartered's global Futuremakers initiative, which focuses on combating inequality and promoting economic inclusion. Dream Factory Foundation Botswana brought experience of entrepreneurship support in Southern Africa to the program. Standard Chartered Botswana's CEO Mpho Masupe described the program's goal as building resilience and capacity, not only distributing funding.

== Structure ==
The program runs in cohorts over five months. Participants receive training in business fundamentals, technology tools, financial management, and growth strategy, alongside one-on-one coaching sessions and access to networking opportunities. They are also connected to mentors and potential investors. Each cohort ends with a graduation and pitch competition where a share of $50,000 (approximately P700,000) in equity-free seed funding is distributed to selected participants.

To be eligible, applicants must be at least 50 percent female-led or owned, registered in Botswana, employ ten or fewer full-time employees, and have an annual revenue of P1 million or less. The women leading or owning the businesses must be between 18 and 40 years of age. The program is not restricted to the technology sector.

== Cohort 1 (2024) ==
The first cohort of 20 participants graduated in February 2025, drawing from fintech, agriculture, e-commerce, and health and beauty sectors. Selection of participants was managed by Dream Factory Foundation, which assessed applicants across a series of evaluations regardless of industry.

== Cohort 2 (2025) ==
The second cohort graduated in November 2025. Over P700,000 in seed funding was distributed to six businesses:

- Ticket Linc (founder: Kelly Ramputswa-Tlale): an online ticketing platform for Botswana's events sector; received the Sustainability and Growth Award
- Spring Blossom (founder: Kemosedile Begani): a climate-smart vegetable production enterprise; received the Innovation Award
- Webmart: a digital services company; received the Technology Award
- Sediba Agtech: a refrigerated farm-to-market courier service; received the Best Pitch Award
- Africa Pork: a pig-farming enterprise with a mentorship component for young girls; received the Pay-it-Forward Award
- Maru: an ethical fashion startup; received the Most Impactful Enterprise Award

The graduation was officiated by Assistant Minister of Trade and Entrepreneurship Baratiwa Mathoothe, who described the program as consistent with the National Entrepreneurship Policy's focus on supporting women-led enterprises and SME competitiveness.

== Cohort 3 (2026) ==
Applications for a third cohort opened in 2026. Standard Chartered confirmed that across the program's first two years, participating businesses had collectively grown revenue by over P5 million, created 128 new jobs, and attracted an additional P400,000 in external funding beyond the seed grants distributed through the program.

== See also ==
- Botswana Innovation Hub
- Women in Film Guild Botswana
- Fintech Association of Botswana
