= Gay, Straight or Taken? =

2007 reality television series

- Genre: Reality television
- Country of origin: United States
- Original language: English
- No. of seasons: 1
- No. of episodes: 18

Production
- Executive producer: Joe Livecchi
- Production locations: Los Angeles, California
- Running time: 30 minutes
- Production company: Endemol USA

Original release
- Network: Lifetime
- Release: January 8 – March 12, 2007

Gay, Straight or Taken? is an American reality television series broadcast by Lifetime. The series premiered on January 8, 2007, and its eighteenth and final episode aired on March 12, 2007. Filmed in Los Angeles, California, each episode depicted a straight single woman going on a group date with three men. Among the men, one is straight and single, one is straight and partnered, and the other is gay and partnered.

At the end of the date, the woman was required to discern which of the men she believed to be straight and single. If she correctly chose the straight single man, the two would win an all-expenses-paid vacation together; if she chose one of the other two men, that man would receive the vacation with his own partner.

Gay, Straight or Taken? was initially conceived in 2003 following a rising interest in LGBT-themed reality shows. The series was passed on by ITV, before being green-lit by Lifetime in 2006. The series garnered generally positive reviews from television critics. Many critics positively contrasted the series' portrayal of gay men from that of Boy Meets Boy and Playing It Straight, however, others deemed the series to be dull. Gay, Straight or Taken? premiered with decent television ratings for Lifetime. Its average viewers tapered over the course of the series, in which it averaged approximately one million viewers.

== Format ==
A female contestant goes on a group date at a spa or resort with three men. Shortly after meeting the men, the contestant receives a cell phone call from a woman who advises her that one of the three men is her boyfriend. Moments later she receives a second call from a man informing her that another of the men is his boyfriend. Now she must try to figure out which man is gay, which one is straight but taken, and which one is straight and available.

During the course of the date, the contestant has the opportunity to spend "alone time" with each of the men, selecting activities which she believes will give her clues as to the sexuality and relationship status of each. At the end of the date, the contestant prepares to announce her decision, but before she can the girlfriend and boyfriend of the two involved men appear on the scene. The contestant then announces which man she believes is gay, which is taken, and which is available. If the contestant correctly chooses the straight and available man, the two of them win a vacation together. If she is wrong, the man she picks wins the trip with his partner.

== Production ==
Gay, Straight or Taken? was initially conceived in 2003 by Remy Blumenfeld of Brighter Pictures as "the world's first poly-sexual dating show." A television pilot was shot for ITV, with plans to move forward with a full series that fall if successful. The pilot's announcement followed a rising interest in LGBT-themed dating shows, such as Boy Meets Boy. Blumenfeld claimed that Gay, Straight or Taken? will "do for dating shows what Will & Grace did for sitcom," however, ITV chose not to move forward with the series.

In early 2006, the series was pitched to Lifetime under the working title Finding Mr. Right. In November 2006, Lifetime green-lit Gay, Straight or Taken? for an eighteen-episode run. Lifetime Networks entertainment president Susanne Daniels expressed her excitement over the series' "new take" on the reality dating genre, in which she acknowledged the challenge of determining which contestants were gay, straight, and taken. Endemol USA president David Goldberg believed Gay, Straight or Taken? would provide "reliable programming" to viewers, and claimed that the series "really turns stereotypes on its head."

Filmed in Los Angeles, California, producers recruited contestants through a series of open calls and Internet database searches. Each episode was filmed over the course of two days, in which contestants received a small stipend for their participation. While all of the date activities were planned in advance, executive producer Joe Livecchi contended that all dialogue among contestants was unscripted.

== Episodes ==
No.	Title	Original release date	US viewers (millions)
1	"Smarty-Pants Seeks Funny Guy"	January 7, 2007	1.3
2	"Artsy Girl Seeks Witty Guy"	January 7, 2007	1.6
3	"Rising Star Seeks the Full Package"	January 14, 2007	N/A
4	"Lively Gal Seeks Athletic Guy"	January 14, 2007	N/A
5	"Music Lover Seeks Artist"	January 21, 2007	N/A
6	"Nature Lover Seeks Mr. Nice Guy"	January 21, 2007	N/A
7	""Joyful" Model Seeks Dancer"	January 28, 2007	N/A
8	"Energetic Gal Seeks Family Man"	January 28, 2007	N/A
9	"Traveler Seeks Adventurer"	February 4, 2007	N/A
10	"Reader-Hiker Seeks Regular Joe"	February 4, 2007	N/A
11	"Go-Getter Seeks Considerate Man"	February 4, 2007	N/A
12	"Book Lover Seeks Evolved Man"	February 18, 2007	N/A
13	"Straight Arrow Seeks Upright Guy"	February 18, 2007	N/A
14	"Sweet Girl Seeks Sociable Guy"	February 25, 2007	N/A
15	"Good-Time Gal Seeks Adonis"	March 4, 2007	N/A
16	"Singular Girl Seeks Intellectual"	March 4, 2007	N/A
17	"Songwriter Seeks Sincere Guy"	March 11, 2007	N/A
18	"Free Spirit Seeks Impulsive Mate"	March 11, 2007	N/A

== Reception ==
Ginia Bellafante of The New York Times referred to the series as "dopey", in which she claimed that it "hardly dismantled stereotypes ... rather, it further bolstered them." Troy Patterson of Slate believed the series was reductive yet entertaining. He stated that "[a]s pure nonsense goes, Gay, Straight or Taken? is briskly paced, invitingly shot, and painfully contemporary—a Love Connection for the conspiracy-minded." Brian Lowry of Variety compared the series to the short-lived 2004 Fox reality series Playing It Straight, stating, "Lifetime seems to have gotten the delicate sexual politics right simply by turning the whole thing into a 21st century Dating Game ... What felt tawdry on Fox, however, has a more benign streak here, one apt to burst stereotypes as much as it promotes them." Ray Richmond of The Hollywood Reporter claimed that the series "is pretty dumb on its face", although "it held my interest clear through the momentous choice at the end." In a critical review, Tom Shales of NBC News claimed that the series was "cringe-inducing" and "less entertaining than a bowl of oyster stew."

=== Ratings ===
The series started off with decent television ratings by Lifetime's standards, averaging 1.3 and 1.6 million viewers for the first two episodes, respectively, which aired on the same night. When averaged as a whole, the series' viewership slightly tapered, with an average of approximately one million.
