= Boy Meets Boy (TV series) =

American reality television series

- Genre: Reality television
- Created by: Douglas Ross; Dean Minerd; Tom Campbell
- Directed by: Catherine McCarthy; S. Leo Chang
- Presented by: Dani Behr
- Starring: James Getzlaff
- Country of origin: United States
- Original language: English
- No. of seasons: 1
- No. of episodes: 6

Production
- Executive producers: Douglas Ross; Greg Stewart; Kathleen French; Dean Minerd
- Running time: 46–47 minutes
- Production companies: Evolution Film & Tape

Original release
- Network: Bravo
- Release: July 29 – September 2, 2003

Boy Meets Boy is an American reality television series broadcast by Bravo. The series ran for six episodes from July 29 to September 2, 2003. It starred human resources manager James Getzlaff, who searched for a partner among a group of fifteen men. Getzleff engaged in one-on-one dates and group activities with the men; however, it was revealed to him in the fourth episode that half of the men were actually straight. Getzlaff typically eliminated three men from the competition at the end of each episode. If the final man in the competition was gay, he and Getzlaff won a monetary reward and a vacation to New Zealand. Conversely, if the final man was straight, he alone won a monetary reward. The series was hosted by English television presenter Dani Behr.

The series premiered to high ratings and became Bravo's second highest-rated show. It was paired with Queer Eye for the Straight Guy as part of the network's gay programming block. It received a mixed reception from television critics. Many critics believed it was dull, although some praised the then-innovative format of a same-sex dating show. The inclusion of covert straight contestants was heavily criticized by critics and audiences, in which many claimed it was cruel to Getzlaff and homophobic. The series was protested by several conservative Christian organizations for its perceived positive representation of LGBTQ people. It received a nomination in the Outstanding Reality Program category at the 15th GLAAD Media Awards.

Boy Meets Boy was the first same-sex dating show. Despite its brief run, the series inspired a wave of LGBTQ-related reality television shows throughout the 2000s. It bolstered the entertainment careers of Getzlaff and contestants such as Dan Wells. In the years that followed its conclusion, Bravo repeatedly expressed interest in producing a second season or spin-off. Numerous publications have cited it as either one of the worst or most controversial reality television series of all time due to the inclusion of covert straight contestants in a same-sex dating show. In 2022, Time regarded the series' first and only season as one of the most influential reality television seasons of all time.

== Format ==
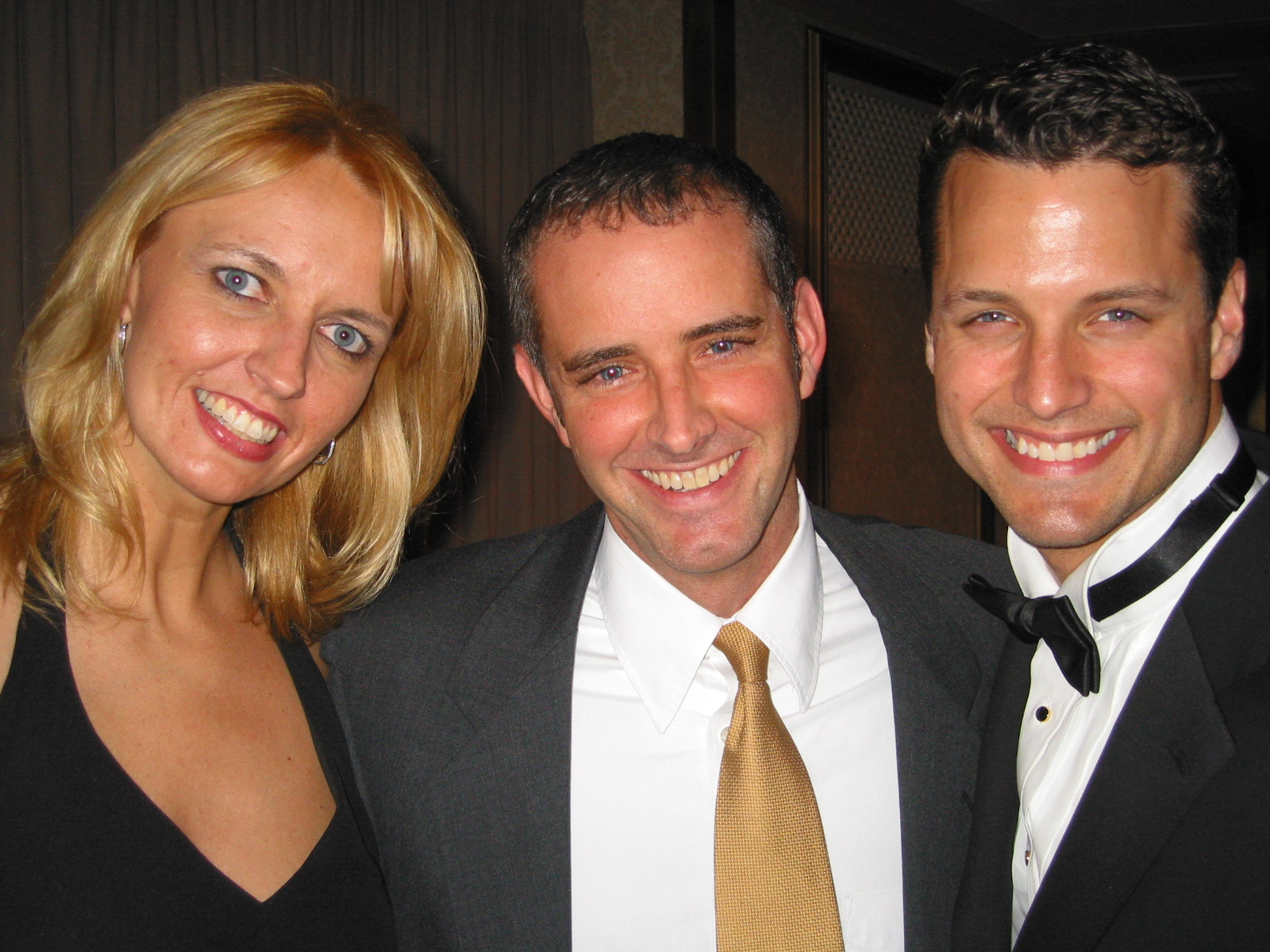
James Getzlaff (right) served as the leading man with Andra Stasko (left) providing him guidance

Set in Palm Springs, California, the series depicted James Getzlaff, a 32-year-old human resources manager, selecting a partner among a group of fifteen men (referred to as "mates"). The fifteen men were required to move into a house together, in which they went on one-on-one dates with Getzlaff and competed in a variety of group activities. At the end of each episode, Getzlaff eliminated three men from the competition. In determining which men to send home, Getzlaff consulted with his longtime friend Andra Stasko, a married straight woman. Toward the end of the series, Getzlaff was informed that the group of men actually consisted of both gay and straight men. If the man Getzlaff chose at the end of the competition was gay, the two would win a vacation to New Zealand and Getzlaff would receive a $25,000 reward. Conversely, if Getzlaff chose a straight man, the straight man alone would win the $25,000 reward while Getzlaff would receive a "very small" cash reward. English television personality Dani Behr served as the host of the series.

== Production ==
=== Conception and development ===
I felt betrayed. [Producers] told me they put the twist in there because they wanted straight people to watch. I said to them, 'Well, you've played gay people as entertainment for straight people. Of course they're going to watch.'

— Getzlaff on the show's twist.

According to executive producer Douglas Ross, "[w]e very specifically designed this show to challenge the viewer's preconceived notions about what it means to be gay and straight. We really wanted it to be an exploration of sexual politics and not sex." While the producers were interested in exploring "sociological issues", the twist of some contestants being straight was implemented in an effort for the series to reach broader audiences. In order to protect the identities of which suitors were gay and straight, any physicality between Getzlaff and suitors beyond kissing was forbidden.

=== Casting ===
Over 500 men from San Francisco, Los Angeles, and San Diego were interviewed for a role in the series. Producers informed gay contestants that they were cast for a gay dating show, while straight contestants were told that it was a reality game show. Producers sought straight men who were interested in confronting stereotypes, specifically those who had "important people in their lives—a relative, a college roommate, etc.—who happened to be gay". According to executive producer Douglas Ross, producers additionally wanted straight contestants who could obscure their sexual orientation without relying on LGBT stereotypes. Straight contestants were required to fabricate gay dating histories and they had to be willing to kiss another man.

Bravo President Jeff Gaspin acknowledged that the show had potential to break or reaffirm stereotypes; however, he claimed that the show would "treat these men no differently than women were treated on The Bachelor."

Straight contestant Dan Wells was sought out by Gaspin, who knew of Wells due to his prior win in the 2001 reality television series Lost. Speaking on his casting in Boy Meets Boy, Wells explained: "it wasn’t tough to act gay . . . You learn as you go and you watch how the gay men were acting and behaving and so forth, and you roll with the vibe of the situation. It’s a deep Method acting experience."

Getzlaff originally interviewed for the role of a mate; however, producers ultimately offered him the leading role instead. As leading man, Getzlaff was required to have a "best female friend" to offer him guidance as he eliminated mates. Getzlaff selected his friend Andra Stasko, a straight married woman; Stasko claimed that she participated in the series to be supportive of Getzlaff coming out.

All of the mates were unpaid for their appearance on the show.

=== Filming ===
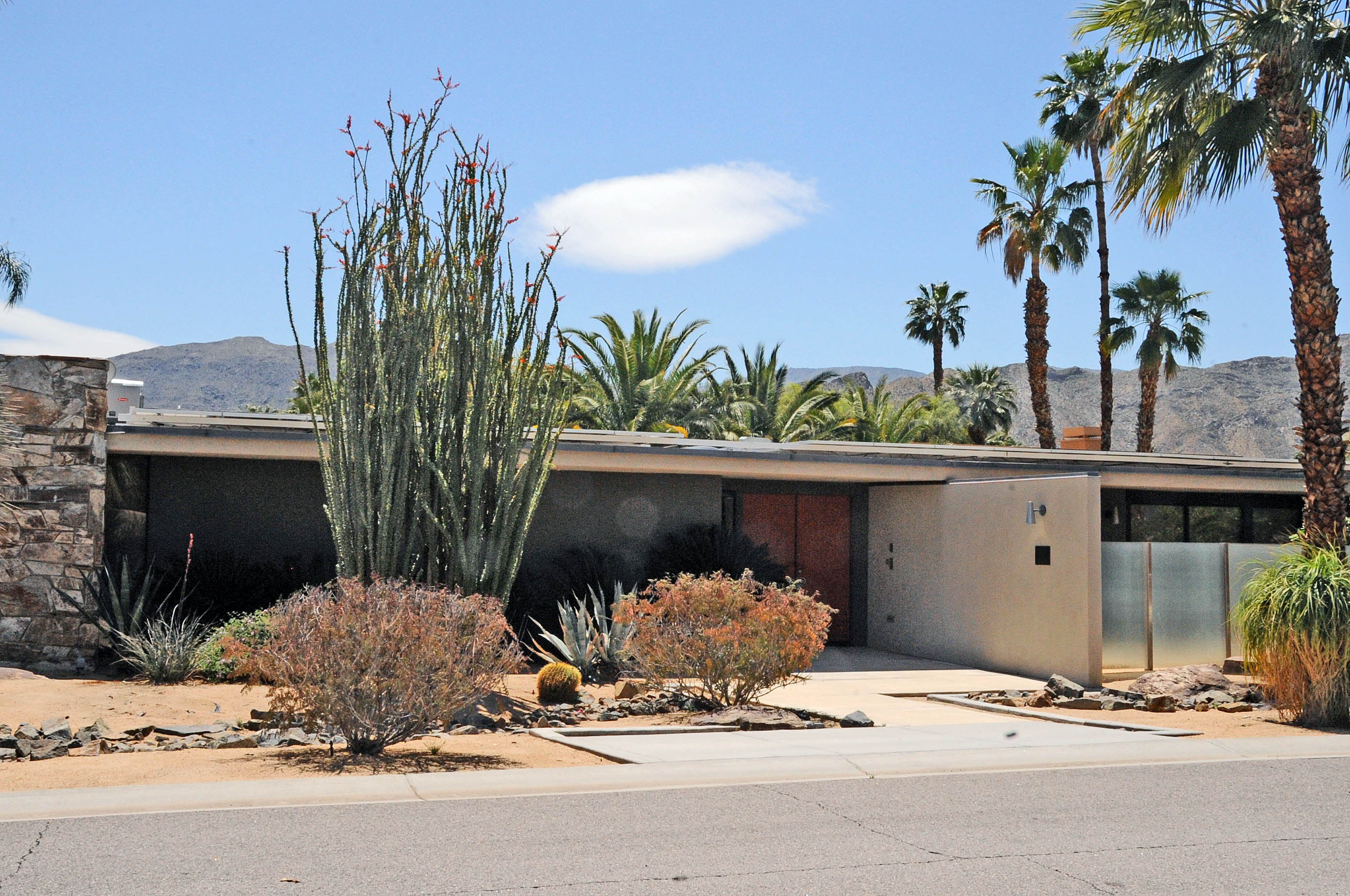
The mates resided at the Kenaston House

The series was filmed in Palm Springs, California, over a period of ten days in May 2003. During the filming process, Getzlaff and Behr and the mates remained at separate houses in Rancho Mirage, California.

== Contestants ==
Name	Age	Occupation	Sexual orientation	Episodes					
Name	Age	Occupation	Sexual orientation	1	2	3	4	5	6
Wes	24	Fundraiser	Gay	SAFE	SAFE	SAFE	SAFE		WINNER
Franklin	23	Sommelier	Straight	SAFE	SAFE	SAFE	SAFE		RUNNER-UP
Brian H.	29	Music Coordinator/Bartender	Gay	SAFE	SAFE	SAFE	SAFE		RUNNER-UP
Sean	27	Art Consultant	Straight	SAFE	SAFE	SAFE	OUT		
Robb	30	Event Planner	Gay	SAFE	SAFE	SAFE	OUT		
Darren	24	Retail Manager	Gay	SAFE	SAFE	SAFE	OUT		
Dan	29	Actor	Straight	SAFE	SAFE	OUT			
Matthew	27	Inventory Manager	Gay	SAFE	SAFE	OUT			
Michael	30	Computer Consultant	Straight	SAFE	SAFE	OUT			
Marc	33	Attorney	Gay	SAFE	OUT				
Paul	23	Draftsman	Straight	SAFE	OUT				
Jim	23	Claims Examiner	Straight	SAFE	OUT				
Brian A.	30	Chiropractor	Straight	OUT					
Jason	26	Combat Systems Instructor	Gay	OUT					
Chris	23	Biologist	Gay	OUT					

The contestant was safe from elimination.
The contestant was eliminated from the competition.
The contestant was not up for elimination.

== Episodes ==
No.	Title	Original release date	US viewers (millions)
1	"Boy Meets Boys and Overexuberant Host"	July 29, 2003	1.6
James and Andra move into their Palm Springs house and meet the mates, who are living together in a separate house. James and Andra spend time with the group at a luau, and James spends some time individually with several of the mates. Later that night, James made his first round of three eliminations. He eliminated Chris (gay), Jason (gay) and Brian A (straight). Twelve mates remain.
2	"Where Have All the Possibly Straight Cowboys Gone?"	August 5, 2003	N/A
The 12 remaining mates are split into two groups. The first group of six goes with James on a group date to a ghost town, where they have country-western dance lessons. The next day, the second group of six mates go on a group date with James, rock climbing, while the first group go on a shopping trip with Andra to buy James a gift (apparently the second group had gone shopping during the dance lesson date, but this was not shown). Back at the mates' house, James, Andra and the mates have a backyard barbecue and present James with their gifts. James and Andra are pulled out of the party by Dani to make the next round of eliminations. Unknown to James, the remaining twelve mates are divided into three groups of four and James must eliminate one from each group. James eliminates Marc (gay), Paul (straight) and Jim (straight). Nine mates are left.
3	"It's Raining Gay and Secretly Straight Men"	August 12, 2003	1.06
James, Andra and five of the remaining mates go on a group outing to a wildlife preserve. After the outing, back at the mates' house, James and Andra confront Dan over conflicting stories he has given them regarding his current dating status. Later that night, James, Andra and the other four remaining mates go out for a night of "gay karaoke" hosted by Miss Coco Peru. At the next elimination round, the remaining nine mates are divided into three groups of three with James eliminating one from each group. Andra is given "veto power," allowing her to overrule one of James' choices and keep the eliminated mate in the house. Andra does not exercise her veto, and James eliminates Matt (gay), Michael (straight) and Dan (straight). There are six mates remaining.
4	"Yeah, But Do You Like Me? (Note: The word "like" is stylized in all uppercase.)"	August 19, 2003	N/A
While Andra has a day at the spa, James and the remaining six mates go on a horseback riding group date. Later that night everyone gathers at the mates' house for a buffet supper. After dinner, a pair of strippers arrive at the mates' house and each of the mates end up giving James a lap dance. The next day brings the next round of eliminations. The mates are split into pairs and one from each pair is eliminated. James eliminates Darren (gay), Robb (gay) and Sean (straight). Three mates remain: Franklin; Wes; and Brian. At the end of this episode, Dani reveals the twist to James, that one of the remaining mates is straight.
5	"The Possibly Straight Cat's Out of the Bag"	August 26, 2003	1.38
Andra has breakfast with the three remaining mates while James absorbs the twist. He reveals the twist to Andra, who flips out. James changes his game strategy from trying to choose someone to date to avoiding choosing the straight man. Each mate goes on an individual date with James. Franklin and James go to a spa for massages and dinner. Brian and James take an early-morning balloon ride and have breakfast at a resort. Wes and James take a limousine ride to a "lookout point," followed by a ride in a horse-drawn carriage and a back yard candlelight dinner (at which several dozen of the candle flames merge, explode and set a table on fire). All three of the remaining mates remain; there is no elimination.
6	"Finale"	September 2, 2003	1.62
The final three mates spend their last day together, while Andra and James try to figure out which of them is straight. Andra has a confrontation with the mates before James makes his final choice. James eliminates Brian (gay) and Franklin (straight). His final choice, Wes Culwell, is gay, so James wins the money and he and Wes win the trip.

== Broadcast history and release ==
Boy Meets Boy premiered on July 29, 2003, in the United States on Bravo at 9:00 pm Eastern Standard Time (EST). The series aired alongside Queer Eye for the Straight Guy as part of the network's gay programming block.

The series was released on DVD on May 25, 2004. The three-disc release featured all six episodes of Boy Meets Boy in addition to cast interviews, behind-the-scene featurettes, casting reels, a drag performance by Miss Coco Peru, an unaired opening sequence, cast biographies, and a "Where Are They Now?" segment about the contestants. In March 2006, the series was released for streaming on OutzoneTV.com, an LGBT-targeted broadband channel created by Bravo and PlanetOut.

== Reception ==
=== Television viewership and ratings ===
The series premiered to 1.6 million viewers, with approximately one million viewers in the 25-54 demographic.

The series finale drew in 1.62 million viewers, which, at the time, was Bravo's second highest-rated show ever.

=== Critical response ===
The show received a mixed reception from television critics; their response was summarized as "fearfully dull" by The Guardian.

A staff writer for ABC News believed the concept of Boy Meets Boy was "groundbreaking", although they criticized the fourth episode's twist as a ploy by producers to increase the series' ratings. Lawrence Donegan of The Guardian believed it was noteworthy "that a respected network such as Bravo is willing to broadcast a series focused entirely on the theme of gay romance".

Steve Johnson of the Chicago Tribune believed the show was boring, in which he claimed that "It proves a gay reality dating show can be every bit as tedious as its straight counterparts."

Some critics compared the series to the unaired 1995 The Jenny Jones Show episode "Revealing Same Sex Secret Crush".

=== Cultural impact ===
Boy Meets Boy was the first same-sex dating show. Despite its short-lived run, the series was responsible for a wave of LGBT-related reality television series in the mid-2000s, including Playing It Straight, Gay, Straight or Taken?, and Straight Dates by Gay Mates. In 2022, Time cited the first and only season of Boy Meets Boy as one of the most influential reality television seasons of all time. In 2015, Entertainment Weekly cited Boy Meets Boy as one of the worst reality television series of all time; a staff writer for the publication claimed that the series was "[c]ruel, offensive, and worst of all, boring."

The series launched the entertainment career of Getzlaff, who subsequently starred in the off-Broadway production My Big Gay Italian Wedding and the comedy film Another Gay Movie.

Following his appearance on the show, contestant Jason Tiner was discharged from the United States Navy for violating the military's "don't ask, don't tell" policy.

=== Awards and nominations ===
Awards and nominations
Award	Year (Note: Indicates the year of ceremony)	Category	Nominee(s)	Result	Ref.
GLAAD Media Awards	2004	Outstanding Reality Program	Boy Meets Boy	Nominated	

== Potential second season ==
Boy Meets Boy creator Doug Ross held out hope for a second season. He acknowledged that the popularity of season one would make it practically impossible for another season with the same twist but also said that he has come up with another twist which Bravo executives thought was fun. Speaking in 2007, Bravo executive Frances Berwick pointed to public knowledge of the twist as a stumbling block to a second season, noting the difficulty Bravo had selling the series overseas because of international press reports on the twist. On the possibility of a season two with a new twist, Berwick said, "What Bravo does best is to do things first and to really sort of shake up people's preconceptions and notions about things. And we would accept many different formats [for a Boy Meets Boy-type show]. I'm not saying that they wouldn't be as good, because you can always come up with something else. [But] until we find the perfect way to do it..." Berwick also suggested that at the time a series as gay-specific as Boy Meets Boy might not have fit into Bravo's overall programming strategy. "It has to feel like it's broad enough, and multidimensional enough to work for our incredibly smart audience."

Supervising producer Kirk Marcolina expressed interest in producing another season focused on women. In 2004, television producer Craig Zadan claimed that a second season did not materialize due to a lack of advertisers.
