= Kim MacQuarrie =

American author and documentary maker

- Born: Los Angeles, California, U.S.
- Education: San Francisco State University; California State University, Fullerton
- Occupations: Author, Documentary Filmmaker, Anthropologist, Conservationist
- Known for: Books and documentary especially on Peru and South America, and as co-founder of the conservation org, Green Our Planet,
- Partner: Ciara Byrne
- Website: www.kimmacquarrie.com

Kim MacQuarrie is an American author, documentary filmmaker, anthropologist, and conservationist whose works include the best-selling The Last Days of the Incas (2007) and The Living Edens. His documentary film work has brought him four national Emmy awards.

MacQuarrie is known for his fine narrative treatments of the history of indigenous cultures, such as the fall of the Inca Empire, as well as his work in conservation. He has published five books and his work has appeared in worldwide publications such as The Guardian, The Christian Science Monitor and National Geographic Traveller. He has produced and or directed dozens of documentaries for television channels such as Discovery Channel, PBS, FX, Fox and others.

== Biography ==
=== Personal life ===
MacQuarrie was born in Los Angeles and attended Valley High School in Las Vegas, Nevada. As an undergraduate, he studied abroad in Paris for a year and a half. As a graduate student, he studied abroad in Lima, Peru for a year at the Universidad Católica and lived in that country for four years. His life partner is Ciara Byrne.

=== Writing career ===
MacQuarrie's first book, Peru's Amazonian Eden: Manu National Park and Biosphere Reserve (1992), covers the flora, fauna, history and anthropology of Manú National Park, the largest and most species-rich protected area to be found anywhere on Earth.

His second book, Gold of the Andes (2 Vol. Set): The Llamas, Alpacas, Vicuñas and Guanacos of South America (1994), gives a thorough accounting of the importance llamas, alpacas, vicuñas and guanacos have had on South American cultures.

MacQuarrie's third book, Where the ANDES meet the AMAZON: Peru & Bolivia's Bahuaja Sonene & Madidi National Parks (2001) chronicles the history, indigenous cultures, and flora and fauna of the largest bi-national protected rainforest area in the world.

MacQuarrie's fourth book, The Last Days of the Incas (2007), covers the Inca Empire, its conquest by Francisco Pizarro and the Spanish conquistadors, and the massive Inca rebellion that lasted nearly four decades after the initial conquest.

MacQuarrie's fifth book, Life and Death in the Andes: On the Trail of Bandits, Heroes, and Revolutionaries (2015), chronicles his 4,300-mile journey from Colombia to Tierra del Fuego.

== Television ==
In 2013, FX (TV channel) announced plans to turn MacQuarrie's Last Days of the Incas into a 13-part dramatic television series, called Conquistadors.

== Philanthropy ==
MacQuarrie is the cofounder of the 501(c)3 nonprofit conservation organization Green our Planet, headquartered in Las Vegas, Nevada. Launched in March, 2013, the foundation operates a free crowdfunding platform for green projects around the world and also runs one of the fastest-growing school garden programs in the United States in Las Vegas,

== Filmography ==
Title	Date	Credit	Awards
Spirits of the Rainforest	1994	Writer, Associate Producer, Assistant Editor	Emmy Awards: Won "Best Cultural/Information Film" "Best Original Score"; CINE Golden Eagle: Won "Environment"
The Spirit Hunters	1994	Producer/Writer	
Wild Discovery - (The Great Siberian Grizzly)	1997	Producer	CableAce: Won "Environmental/Nature Documentary Special"
The Living Edens - (Manu: Peru's Hidden Rain Forest)	1997	Producer/Editor/Cinematographer	Emmy Awards: Won "Outstanding Achievement in a Craft in News and Documentary Programming - Music Jackson Hole Wildlife Film Festival: Won "Best Limited Series"
The Living Edens - (Kamchatka: Siberia's Forbidden Wilderness)	2000	Producer/Editor/Cinematographer	Emmy Awards: Won "Best Cultural/Information Film"; CINE Golden Eagle: Won
Playing It Straight	2004	Senior Story Producer	
Sheer Dallas	2005	Senior Story Producer	
30 Days - (Immigration)	2006	Story Producer	
Tattoo Hunter	2009	Series Producer & Director	

== Written works ==
Date first published	Title	Publisher information
16 August 1991	Manu - Peru's Amazonian Eden: National Park and Biosphere Reserve	Francis O. Patthey & Sons, hardcover, ISBN 8489119120
16 August 1994	Gold of the Andes (2 Vol. Set): The Llamas, Alpacas, Vicuñas and Guanacos of South America	Francis O. Patthey & Sons, hardcover, ISBN 8489119007
1 January 2001	Where the Andes meet the Amazaon: Peru & Bolivia's Bahuaja Sonene & Madidi National Parks	Francis O. Patthey & Sons, hardcover, ISBN 8489119147
29 May 2007	The Last Days of the Incas	Simon & Schuster, hardcover, ISBN 074326049X
1 December 2015	Life and Death in the Andes: On the Trail of Bandits, Heroes, and Revolutionaries	Simon & Schuster, hardcover, ISBN 143916889X
