= Moreetsi Gabang =

- Occupations: Film director; Screenwriter; Author
- Years active: 2010s–present
- Known for: Zombie Date Night in Tlokweng (2023)
- Awards: NEFTI Africa Best Film Award (2023); Bessie Head Literature Award (x2)

Moreetsi Gabang is a Motswana film director, screenwriter, and author. He co-founded Mainane Studios, a film production company based in Gaborone. He is best known internationally for directing Zombie Date Night in Tlokweng (2023), a short horror-comedy film that became the first Botswana film to win the NEFTI Africa Best Film Award at the Durban FilmMart in South Africa. He has also won the Bessie Head Literature Award twice.

== Career ==
=== Mainane Studios ===
Gabang co-founded Mainane Studios with Kabelo "K-Bos" Motlhatlhedi and Tricia Sello. The company focuses on film directing, story development, pre-production, production, and post-production, and aims to make films rooted in Botswana's culture for both local and international audiences. An earlier short film by the studio, Baratani (The Hill of Lovers), generated royalties for its cast and crew after a marketing and networking effort.

=== Zombie Date Night in Tlokweng (2023) ===
Zombie Date Night in Tlokweng is a horror-comedy short film written and directed by Gabang and produced by Frank Oteng. The story follows a young couple whose date night is disrupted when a roommate returns home after attending a religious sermon and is found to be possessed by a demonic spirit. The film's premise draws on the cultural practice of the Batlokwa people of burying their deceased within their residential plots, which the film frames as the setup for a zombie outbreak.

The film competed at the NEFTI Africa competition at the Durban FilmMart on 22 July 2023, alongside two South African films. NEFTI Africa is a short film competition run by NEFT Vodka, African Bank, Adobe, TikTok, and the International Emerging Film Talents Association (IEFTA), designed to support underrepresented filmmakers from developing countries. Gabang won both the Best Film Award ($5,000) and the Audience Choice Award ($2,000), making him the first Botswana director to win the competition. Judges included actress Vivica A. Fox, Academy Award-winning producer Bruce Cohen, and Disney/21st Century Fox Post-Production President Ted Gagliano.

The cast included South African actor Marcus Mabusela, Gofaone Nkwane, comedian William Last KRM, and several local comedy performers including Jethro "Umaga" Ndebele, Bambino Ndiwenyu, Triccs, Jonny Pula, Precious Olerile, Lebone Mokone, Mamelang Lefitlhile, and child actor Olerato Kgalemang.

=== Literature ===
Gabang has won the Bessie Head Literature Award twice. The award is named after Bessie Head, the South African-born author who spent much of her life in Botswana and is considered one of the country's most significant literary figures.

== See also ==
- Bantu Film Festival
- Bessie Head
- Durban FilmMart
