= Dialogue ONE =

Theatre festival for solo performance

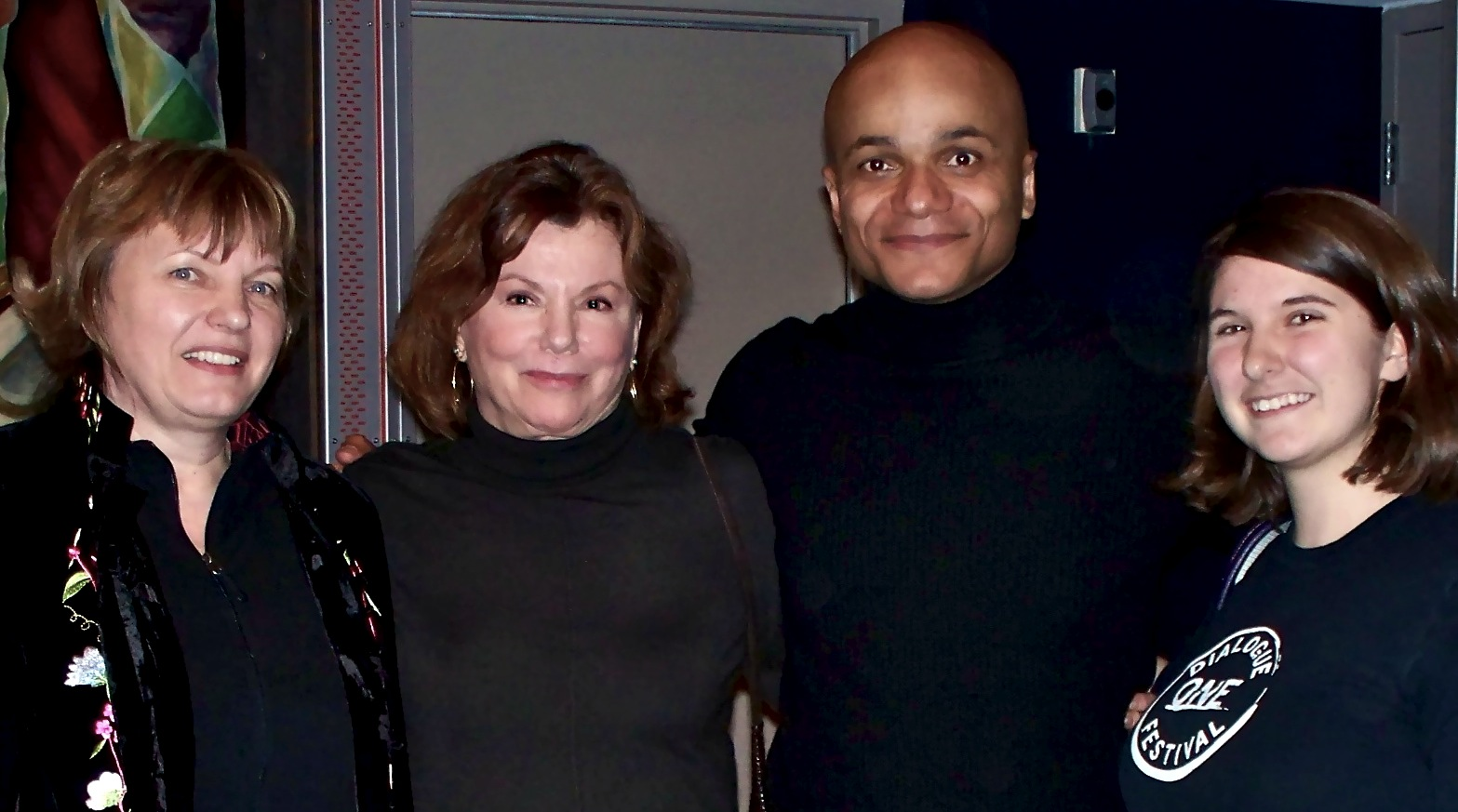
4-time Oscar nominee Marsha Mason with Dialogue ONE associates

Dialogue ONE is an international theatre festival of one-person theatre. Its founder and artistic director is Omar Sangare, actor and professor at Williams College.

== History ==
The festival's primary aim is to establish a platform for Williams College students and professional artists to share their solo theatrical work. The festival was founded in 2007. It takes place annually, usually in late November or early December at the ’62 Center for Theatre and Dance in Williamstown, Massachusetts. There are three categories of awards: Best Guest Performer, Best Student Performer, and Outstanding Contribution to Theatre.

== Performers ==
The performers explore essential dramatic themes such as intellectual and emotional complexity, the subject of solitude, and the uniqueness of human imperfection. The festival gathers solo pieces performed by Williams students and artists from all over the world. Artists who have performed at the festival include: Jonah Bokaer, Tim Collins, Kymbali Craig, Matt Oberg, John Clancy, Ilya Khodosh, Donald Molosi, among others. In 2009's edition, Omar Sangare presented his "True Theatre Critic", which had won many national and international prizes, including the New York International Fringe Festival's Best Acting Award. Sangare says he believes that a global range of artists will inspire an artistic dialog among students, professionals, and audiences. From his point of view, the festival is an occasion to share diverse perspectives that span cultural, perceptional, linguistic, professional, or personal similarities and differences between people.
