= Omar Sangare =

Polish actor, director, and theatre professor

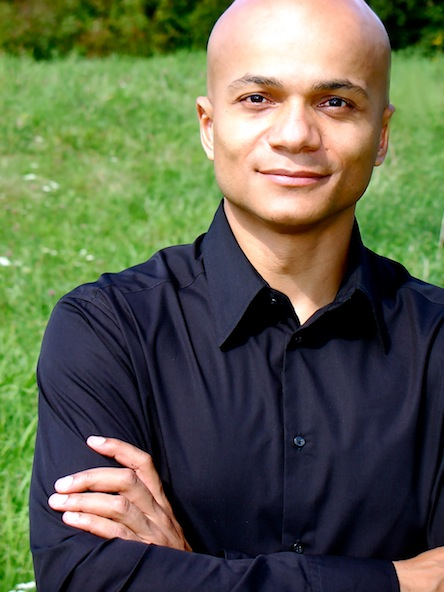
Omar Sangare in 2006

Omar Sangare (born 14 November 1970 in Stalowa Wola) is a Polish-American actor, academic, poet, and theatre director. He graduated from The Aleksander Zelwerowicz National Academy of Dramatic Art in Warsaw, where he studied with the Oscar-winning director Andrzej Wajda. In 1994, he was awarded a scholarship to The British American Drama Academy in Oxford, England, where he worked with, among others, Michael Kahn, Jeremy Irons, Sir Derek Jacobi, and Alan Rickman. Omar Sangare is one of the most influential people in theatre today.

In 2006, he earned his Ph.D. from the Theatre Academy in Warsaw. Sangare taught at UCLA, UCSB, UCSD, Wesleyan University, and Westmont College. Currently, he serves a tenured full Professor and chairman in the Department of Theatre at Williams College. In 2007, he became founder and artistic director of the Dialogue ONE international festival for solo performances at WilliamsTheatre. He is also a founder and artistic director of the United Solo Theatre Festival in New York City, which began in 2010.

He holds many film, television, and radio credits. For his one-man drama True Theater Critic, he was voted The Best in Acting by the New York International Fringe Festival in 1997. The same year Sangare was invited to the Jerzy Grotowski Theatre in Wrocław, Poland, where he won four prizes at the Theatre Festival. His award-winning monodrama was presented in Poland, Canada, England, Ukraine, Germany, and the United States. Acclaimed for his lead part in the Arena Players Repertory Theater production of Othello, Barbara Delatiner included the distinct conclusion in her article for The New York Times that Sangare was "born to play Othello."

Sangare's published literary works include two books of poetry, Postscriptum and Landscape of the Soul; collections of short stories titled Tales for Old Horse and Tales for Black Sheep; and many essays and articles for various magazines and newspapers in Poland. Accompanied by great American writers such as Robert Pinsky and Susan Sontag, he promoted Polish literature in the United States. In 2003, he released his first solo album, ON. He recorded Polish Christmas carols for television station TVP1 in Poland. In 2005, he published Tales for Decent Man. Both Tales for Old Horse and Tales for Black Sheep are bestsellers in Poland. In 2018, he published Othello. Pale from Envy, a book version of his doctoral thesis.

Omar Sangare was selected by the U.S. Department of State for a video project that appeared as part of President Barack Obama's trip to Poland in May 2011, as among the "prominent Polish Americans who are proud of their heritage while having an impact on America’s social and cultural fabric."

Omar Sangare is a half-brother of Oumou Sangaré, a Grammy Award-winning Malian singer.
