= Dan Wells (actor) =

American actor

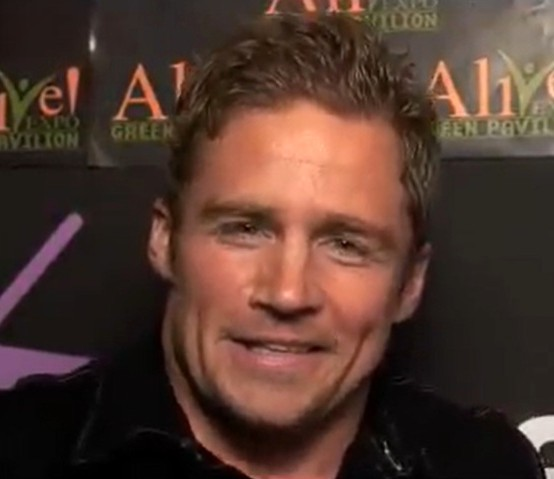
- Wells in 2008
- Born: Daniel Dwayne Wells; October 25, 1973 (age 52); Orange County, California
- Occupation: Actor
- Years active: 2001 – Present

Daniel Dwayne Wells (born October 25, 1973) is an American reality television personality and actor. He is best known for playing the role of Eric Simpson in Watch Over Me.

He also appeared on Days of Our Lives in an unconventional story; his character Stan was one of the show's main female characters in disguise.

In recent years, Wells changed careers and now works in the fitness field. He opened several gyms and has appeared on talk shows as a fitness expert. In 2016, he appeared on NBC's Strong as one of the trainers for the competitors.

== Filmography ==
=== Film ===
Year	Title	Role	Notes
2003	Going Down	Ramone	
2003	Irangeles	Kip Wilson	
2004	Bloody Tease	Sammy	video
2004	Down the Rabbit Hole	Tyler Pearson	short
2004	Species III	Jake	video
2004	Push	Tony Morelli	
2007	The Deep Below	Brad	
2009	Prayers for Bobby	Rev Hassler	TV movie
2009	Anytown	Deputy LeBlanc	
2009	The Blue Wall	EMT O'Brien	short
2012	Divorce Invitation	Richard	

=== TV shows ===
Year	Title	Role	Notes
2001	Lost	Contestant	reality show
2003	Boy Meets Boy	Contestant - Straight	reality show
2004	Gilmore Girls	Delivery Guy	"Last Week Fights, This Week Tights" (Season 4, Episode 21)
2005, 2021	Days of Our Lives	Stan Brady	85 episodes
2006	Free Ride	Steve Moss	main role, 5 episodes
2006	Will & Grace	Mike	"Partners 'n' Crime" (Season 8, Episode 21)
2006–2007	Watch Over Me	Eric Simpson	main role, 67 episodes
2007	CSI: NY	Devon Walsh	"The Deep" (Season 4, Episode 21)
2010	90210	Security Guard	"Rats and Heroes" (Season 2, Episode 13)
2011	2 Broke Girls	Michael #3	"And the Pretty Problem" (Season 1, Episode 7)
2012	Castle	Uniformed Cop	"After the Storm" (Season 5, Episode 1)
2013	Legit	Bailiff	"Justice" (Season 1, Episode 5)
