= The Living Edens =

- Genre: Nature documentary
- Written by: Laura Fravel; Alex Gregory; Kim MacQuarrie; Bruce Reitherman; Dominic Weston; Andrew Young
- Narrated by: Maya Angelou; Peter Coyote; Linda Hunt; Edward James Olmos; Ewan Bailey (British edition)
- Composer: Laura Karpman
- Countries of origin: United States; United Kingdom
- Original language: English
- No. of episodes: 25

Production
- Executive producers: Paul Cox; Alex Gregory
- Producers: Drew Hunt; Kim Macquarrie; Bruce Reitherman; Susan Todd; Neal Williams; Andrew Young
- Running time: 60 minutes
- Production companies: ABC/Kane Productions (1997–2001); Devillier Donegan Enterprises (2002–03); Trebitsch Produktion International GmbH

Original release
- Network: PBS
- Release: 5 February 1997 – 14 September 2003

The Living Edens is a nature documentary television series that aired on PBS from 1997 to 2003. Each episode focuses on a specific natural location around the world, showcasing its unique ecosystems, wildlife, and the beauty of unspoiled natural environments. The series highlighted the importance of conservation and the intrinsic value of these natural habitats.

== Episodes ==
The series consists of 25 episodes:

=== Denali - Alaska Great Wilderness ===
On February 5, 1997, an expanse of Alaskan wilderness covering more than six million acres unfolds at the base of North America's tallest peak. This landscape is dominated by the presence of Denali, also known as The Great One. Enduring extreme seasonal shifts, Denali experiences harsh winters with 20 hours of darkness and temperatures plummeting nearly 100 degrees Fahrenheit below zero, while summers boast 20 hours of continuous sunlight. Within this sub-Arctic ecosystem, grizzly bears, wolves, moose, ground squirrels, and golden eagles have adapted to thrive amidst the challenges posed by the land's climatic extremes. Denali, often referred to as an Eden, becomes a place where life pulses through rigorous cycles of harsh, dark winters, framed by the luminosity of June and August. In this unforgiving environment, both flora and fauna must exhibit strength and resilience to endure and flourish.

=== Patagonia - Life at the End of the Earth ===
(Apr. 30, 1997) Journey to the end of the earth, where the Andes stand above a land of extremes. Patagonia has stood untouched by modern civilisation for millennia. This is a place where creatures like the guanaco, elephant seal, rhea, penguin and armadillo have adapted to an environment of constant wind. Here, the Andean condor lives.

=== Namib - Africa Burning Shore ===
(Jul. 16, 1997) There is a 1200-mile strip of land off the southwestern coast of Africa where the searing Namibian desert meets the frigid Atlantic sea. Here the basic elements of the earth exist in paradoxical extremes. Namib, the hottest of lands, is obscured in mist created by the Benguela, one of the coldest of ocean currents. Fur seals and penguins divide their time between the sandy shore and the icy water of the sea, while elephant, ostrich, springbok, hyena roam the wind-swept dunes. The adaptations made to this ancient desert's extreme heat allow these and other creatures to survive in an Eden called Namib.

=== Manu - Peru Hidden Rainforest ===
(Nov. 12, 1997) Along the eastern base of the Peruvian Andes is a great river named Manu, the life blood for one of the world's great secrets - the Manu Biosphere Reserve. This Eden is the richest Amazonian wilderness on Earth. As mist rises off the great river, howler monkeys issue the wake up call in the rain forest. Hundreds of parrots form a brilliant kaleidoscope as they feast on the cliff-side clay. Giant otters take their first swim in the cool waters while sloths get a slow start to their day beneath the mystical canopy. Discover what the day will bring in this mysterious tropical paradise where 90 per cent of the flora and fauna have yet to be identified.

=== Etosha - Africa Untamed Wilderness ===
(Feb. 11, 1998) In southwestern Africa, Etosha stands as a land where life endures extreme challenges in a landscape where survival is a constant struggle. This vast and ancient terrain experiences seasonal paradoxes. During the lushness of the wet season, lions, cheetahs, elephants, jackals, giraffes, springboks, and zebras engage in the timeless cycle of life with glorious abundance. However, at the zenith of the scorching dry season, Etosha's heart transforms into a parched and blistered wasteland, where drought and thirst threaten both predator and prey. For those who persevere through its harshest period, Etosha reverts to being a Living Eden.

=== Bhutan - The Last Shangri-La ===
(May 13, 1998) Here in a place an Eden where time stands still - where nature and religion have combined to turn a tiny Buddhist kingdom into the world's last Shangri-La. Locked between Tibet and India, Bhutan is the jewel of the Himalayas. To the north of the kingdom, towering virgin peaks rise to 25,000 feet. Beneath steep glacial walls, alpine highlands fall to misty forests. Mountain streams cut through gorges on their way down to warmer valleys and wide marshes in the heart of the kingdom. One distinct landscape drops to the next before finally descending to the jungles and grasslands of the southern plains. For the people who have adapted to this domain of extremes, Bhutan is a Living Eden where respect for life, in all its many incarnations, endures like the land itself.

=== Palau - Paradise of the Pacific ===
(Jul. 15, 1998) Far to the east of India and Indonesia is a place where the sea hides a treasure of living riches - a secret corner of the ocean where ancient species still thrive in dazzling abundance, wildness and wonder. It sits alone at the edge of the vast Pacific Ocean, sheltered from time and the outside world. As lush as any paradise of our imagination, it is not one emerald island but an archipelago of more than two hundred, nearly all uninhabited. Along its submerged shoulders flourish some of the richest coral reefs remaining on Earth. In the reefs' shadows, life seeks shelter from the open water. This place is called Palau, a Living Eden where all is not what it seems - a home to a world of novelties concocted by nature unconstrained.

=== Madagascar - A World Apart ===
(Nov. 4, 1998) Three hundred miles off the east coast of Africa lies an island forgotten by time. A place where evolution has taken the familiar and created the bizarre. Separated from the mainland for over a hundred million years, life here has followed its own Darwinian path. Home to a host of creatures found nowhere else - this is an alternate world where lush rainforests fall to sun-scorched plains and trees seem to stand with their roots in the sky. Preserved by its isolation, this wondrous realm is a land unlike any other.

=== South Georgia Island - Paradise of Ice ===
(Jan. 20, 1999) In the South Atlantic Ocean amid huge, frozen glaciers and giant ice floes, a range of rough, ice-capped mountains rise up to form Antarctica's liveliest neighborhood: South Georgia Island. At 106 miles in length, this imposing icy island regularly endures storm winds in excess of 120 mph while nearby ocean waves swell to 50-foot heights. Home to bull elephant seals and the wandering albatross, this stark, snowy land boasts the world's largest penguin population. Frigid and windswept, it is an unlikely living Eden. But South Georgia Island is both a haven and a paradise - one of the world's true wonders and the single most important nesting and breeding ground on Earth.

=== Borneo - Island in the Wild ===
(Apr. 28, 1999) As the Earth's third largest island, Borneo straddles the equator, carved up between Indonesia, Malaysia and Brunei. The island is dominated by Kota Kinabalu, a massive outcrop of rock more than 13,000 feet high and the tallest peak in South East Asia. Far below, warm morning mists shroud the rainforest, concealing the exotic creatures teeming in and below the canopy. The vast jungle provides shelter for some of the rarest, strangest and most magnificent creatures on Earth. It is a Living Eden both rich and fragile - a self-contained world of surprises and transformations.

=== Kakadu - Australia Ancient Wilderness ===
(Jul. 14, 1999) Over hundred kilometres from Australia's north coast, the Yellow Waters and the South Alligator Rivers cut through an ancient limestone plateau to create Kakadu National Park. This is a rich natural world where nature has sculpted rainforest niches and deep gorges that fill with wild rivers with each monsoon. Here, the mighty saltwater crocodile reigns supreme. In the rivers, up the creeks and on the shores, the saltwater crocodile swims, hunts and lays eggs. Living alongside this giant prehistoric reptile are wallabies, pig-nosed turtles, king brown snakes, water lizards and hundreds of species of brightly coloured birds. For the Aborigines, the first humans to live here, there is no afterlife paradise is here and now in a Living Eden called Kakadu.

=== Canyonlands - America's Wildwest ===
(Nov. 17, 1999) Deep in the vast American West lies a high, lonely land called the Colorado Plateau. Lying mostly in Utah, it extends south into Arizona and east into Colorado. In the very heart of the plateau lies a geological spectacle where millions of years of exposure to weather and the chiseling force of the Colorado River has created a labyrinth of pinnacles, chasms, arches, gorges and canyons. It is not just form, but colour that creates the beauty of this rugged place. The varied mineral content of the layers of rock creates an entire palette of hues that change as the sun moves through the sky from canyon rim to canyon rim. This Living Eden is a stark and untamed wilderness, home to an incredible array of creatures that instinctively embody the spirit of the West. From the elusive mountain lion to the resourceful coyote, only the strongest survive in Canyonlands.

=== Kamchatka - Siberia Forbidden Wilderness ===
(May 10, 2000) Jutting south from the far east of Siberia lies an isolated and mountainous peninsula where volcanoes, geysers and bubbling hot springs create the smoke, steam and fire that prevail in this icy and remote place. This harsh and beautiful land is home to the densest population of grizzly bears in the world and the biggest brown bears in Eurasia. Siberian bighorn sheep, silver foxes, sables, mink and black-capped marmots have all adapted to the severe climate. Walruses, northern fur seals, sea lions dot its coastline, and bowhead whales breed in the waters just offshore. Millions of salmon swim in its streams while the world's largest eagles soar above all that make Kamchatka a living Eden. Narrated by Linda Hunt.

=== Thailand - Jewel of the Orient ===
(1999) On the shores of the Andaman Sea lies a lush tropical paradise called Thailand, a peninsular finger reaching down from the Southeast Asian mainland as if to touch the equator. Thailand's jungles are the domain of tigers. Elephants amble through the dense forest while white-handed gibbons swing from branch to branch. This is a mysterious world of flying snakes and lizards where cobra is king. Beneath the warm surrounding waters, brilliant coral reef shelters bustling aquatic life while sharks, manta rays and octopus continue their timeless ballet in the shadow of this tropical Living Eden. This episode is dedicated to the memory of Kenneth Houseman, Helen Gromme and Mark Graham, that lost their lives in a plane crash, while they were directed to Surat Thani in order to meet an ABC/Kane team, with whom they were producing a documentary on Thailand's wildlife.

=== Ngorongoro - Africa Cradle of Life ===
(Jul. 26, 2000) Nearly three million years ago, a massive explosion tore apart an enormous stratovolcano in Eastern Africa's Great Rift Valley to form the Ngorongoro Crater, one of the true wonders of the world. Today, the Ngorongoro Crater is a microcosm of African life enclosed in one unique place. From grasslands, wetlands and lakes to forests and slopes, the crater provides habitats for Africa's creatures both great and small. This Living Eden is a glorious stage where lions, hyenas, cheetahs, jackals, vultures, servals and wildebeest act out a dramatic story of life and death that was set into motion so long ago.

=== Anamalai - India Elephant Mountain ===
(Nov. 8, 2000) As the Western Ghats fall away into the heat and haze of India's Deep South, a solitary mountain rises up from the hot, dusty plains of Tamil Nadu. Seen from a distance, the mountain's silhouette is uncannily familiar: the sweep of the trunk and characteristic bulging forehead. It is an unmistakable profile. It is called Anamali - the Elephant Mountain. Here the elephant roams free and unmolested for it is the living embodiment of Ganesh, the Remover of Obstacles. Among stands of rosewood, cardamon and bamboo are forest temples to the elephant-headed deity, perhaps the most popular in the Hindu pantheon. The late Anne Bancroft narrates as we traverse the sacred ground of this living Eden, "home of gods", "lords of protection".

=== Yellowstone - America Sacred Wilderness ===
(Jan. 31, 2001) Paul Schullery has been watching wildlife at Yellowstone for 30 years, an example of successful wildlife conservation efforts. As he guides us through the environment, wolves and grizzly bears mount chase sequences in their quest for elk, and mountain lions gambol about without worry.

=== Costa Rica - Land of Pure Life ===
(May 29, 2001) The misty rain forests, rivers and beautiful white sand beaches of Costa Rica are home to one of the most diverse assemblages of life on Earth. Along the coast, giant crocodiles fight for the right to mate, while in the trees, troops of capuchin, squirrel and howler monkeys, as well as resplendent quetzals and beautiful songbirds, forage for food above the forest floor that is home to Hercules beetles, deadly army ants and poison dart frogs. On the sandy beaches hatchling sea turtles emerge by the thousands to race to the safety of the sea and, though few survive and reach open ocean, enough return to lay their eggs and complete the cycle of life unique to this Eden called Costa Rica.

=== Tasmania - Land of the Devils ===
(Jun. 12, 2001 Tasmania: Land of the Devils) Off the southeast coast of Australia is the island refuge of Tasmania. Safe from the forces that have changed much of the Australian continent, Tasmania is an Eden of magnificent forests, snow-capped mountain ranges, giant waterfalls, wild rivers and pristine coastlines. Tasmania is also the home of the largest marsupial carnivore - the Tasmanian Devil. Voracious eaters with powerful jaws, they often leave behind only the jawbone of their prey. Some of the oldest trees on earth, Huon pines over 2,000 years old, and the tallest flowering tree, the Swamp Gum, share this unique island with wallabies, bettongs, quolls, tiger snakes and ground parrots. Off the coast, giant kelp forests and sponge gardens host the prehistoric handfish, king crab, sea dragons, red velvet fish and deep sea anglerfish, many of which are found nowhere else on earth.

=== Glacier Bay - Alaska Wild Coast ===
(Nov. 20, 2001) Nestled in the heart of southeast Alaska, Glacier Bay is a wild paradise of ocean and ice. This film chronicles the lives of brown bears, bald eagles, humpback whales and other charismatic species. Nearly all life here is ultimately tied to the salmon, and the heroic migration of these fish provides the thread that weaves together the remarkable fabric of life in this story. Glacier Bay, a stunning formation of fjords, is the centre stage for this great drama.

=== Temple of the Tiger - India Bandhavgarh Wilderness ===
(May 5, 2002) Once a hunting preserve for the Indian Maharajas, Bandhavgarh National Park is one of the most important tiger habitats remaining in Asia. Within the park, an abandoned palace harbours a flourishing population of tigers, bats, cobras, and monkeys who share their domain with a solitary temple priest. The dominant male tiger that has ruled this domain for years is now being challenged by a younger, stronger male.

=== Patagonia: Tuxedo Junction ===
(Jun. 16, 2002) Observing penguins in Argentina, as the birds reacquaint themselves during the breeding season after a long separation. Included: mating rituals and nest building. Narrated by Betsy Ames.

=== Big Sur - California Wild Coast ===
The episode was first broadcast on November 24, 2002, which examines the Big Sur region of the central California coast. Where the Santa Lucia Mountains rise steeply from the Pacific Ocean just south of Monterey. It covers the area’s coastal and mountain environments and the wildlife found there, including California condors, falcons, blue whales, great white sharks, and elephant seals.

=== Arctic Oasis - Canada Southampton Island ===
(Dec. 21, 2003) During the Arctic spring and summer, one of Earth's most dazzling displays of rejuvenation takes place in Canada's far north. A brief season of light and plenty brings great migrations of bowhead and beluga whales, harp seals, caribou, and polar bears. It also brings an Inuk hunter whose aim is to teach his 12-year-old son the traditional survival skills of his ancient people.

=== The Lost World - Venezuela Ancient Tepuis ===
(Sep. 14, 2003) The inspiration for Sir Arthur Conan Doyle's, The Lost World and home to the world's tallest waterfall, Venezuela's plateaus form a strange and isolated wilderness.

== See also ==
- Planet Earth
- The Blue Planet
- The Living Planet
- Nature (PBS)
- NOVA (PBS)
