= Donald Molosi =

Botswanan actor (born 1985)

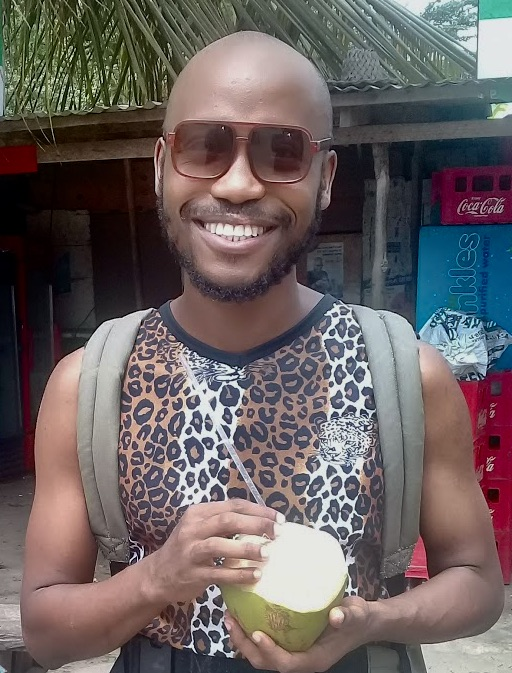
- Donald Molosi in Watamu in 2019
- Born: Donald Leungo Gosego Molosi; 11 December 1985 (age 40); Mahalapye, Botswana
- Citizenship: Motswana
- Education: Williams College, University of California Santa Barbara Brunel University
- Occupations: Actor; writer; playwright
- Years active: 2002–present
- Awards: 2016 50 Golden Jubilee under 40 Awards Gabz FM and Mail & Guardian

Donald Leungo Gosego Molosi (born 11 December 1985) is an actor, writer and playwright from Botswana. Molosi debuted off-Broadway in 2010 as Philly Lutaaya in Today It's Me making him the first Motswana to perform off-Broadway.

In 2011, Molosi won the Best Short Solo Award at United Solo Theatre Festival for his performance as Seretse Khama in Blue, Black and White. In 2013, Molosi returned off-Broadway to perform Motswana: Africa, Dream Again. He played supporting roles in the films A United Kingdom (2016) and Given (2009). As a playwright, Molosi has published a collection of his original off-Broadway plays, which include We Are All Blue, Blue, Black and White and Motswana: Africa, Dream Again in 2016.

== Education ==
Molosi attended Williams College in the United States, where he graduated with a double-major Bachelor of Arts degree in Theatre and Political Science. He holds a Diploma in Classical acting from the London Academy of Music and Dramatic Art, and a Master of Arts degree in Theatre and Performance Studies from the University of California Santa Barbara. In 2021 Molosi completed an MA in Creative Writing at Brunel University in the United Kingdom, thorough a Chevening scholarship.

== Early life and background ==
Donald Molosi was born the last child of 2 in Mahalapye, Botswana, in 1985 and attended Maru a Pula School in Gaborone, Botswana, before continuing his education in London and the United States of America. From a young age, Molosi demonstrated a natural performance flair and by the age of 16, he was already touring with arts festivals, including the Maitisong Festival in Gaborone, with The Company Maitisong, where Molosi was also co-writing plays, and the National Arts Festival, Grahamstown, South Africa. Molosi made a radio and television appearances at a young age becoming the youngest person on the airwaves as a radio announcer at Yarona FM. He also partnered with UNICEF as a child presenter on Botswana Television during the UN International Children's Day of Broadcasting. This resulted in a short stint at Radio Botswana 2 (RB2) under the tutelage of radio veteran, One Rabantheng.

In 2002, Molosi wrote and staged his first solo performance, Fragments, directed by renowned Motswana director Gao Lemmenyane at 17. Fragments is based on children's rights in Botswana. With the critical acclaim that Fragments earned, Molosi was invited to New York City for the United Nations General Assembly Special Session on Children and he had a grand performance of the same play with world leaders such as former UN Secretary General Kofi Annan and former South African President Nelson Mandela in attendance. Molosi took the Fragments message further to advocate for children's rights through his poetry exhibition, Can I Live? (2002) based on his interpretation of the African Charter on the Rights and Welfare of the Child. For his stellar and outstanding efforts in performances, Molosi received the Sir Seretse and Lady Ruth Khama Brilliant Spirit Award (2003) by His Excellency Lt. Gen. Seretse Khama Ian Khama. While in High school at Taft School in Watertown, Connecticut, in 2005, Molosi was one of the two lead vocalists in the a cappella group Eccedoce and he starred in regional theatrical productions You Can't Take It With You and The Misanthrope.

By the time Molosi turned 18, he had decided to move to United States and was shortly enrolled at Williams College, America's leading Liberal Arts College in Williamstown, Massachusetts, to pursue two bachelor's degrees both in Theater and Political Science. His passion in arts and performances culminated in a thesis that showcased the exhibition of poetryEmbodied, which features the paintings of Stefan Elrington and Maya Lama. Molosi later studied under Academy-Award winner Janet Suzman at the London Academy of Music and Dramatic Art (LAMDA) where he earned his Graduate Diploma in Classical Acting. Molosi is an ambassador for Brand Botswana.

== Career ==
Molosi has won several regional, national and international awards as a playwright, actor and writer. In addition to his early awards, he won Best Actor at the Dialogue One Festival in Massachusetts for his portrayal of Sir Seretse Khama 2008; the Sanford Prize for Excellence in Theater 2009 and the 2009 Florence Chandler Fellowship, which enabled him to conduct theater research around the world for 12 months.

In 2010, Molosi returned to New York's off-Broadway, where he successfully staged four solo shows, including Blue, Black and White about the life of Seretse Khama that earned Molosi Best Actor Award in 2011 and Today It's Me about the life of Uganda's music superstar where he won the Robert Potter Playwriting Award. Molosi was also a headliner at the 2015 Writivism Festival in Uganda where he graced the occasion with yet another outstanding performance of Today It's Me to the delight of his numerous audience at the event. He was equally a Writivism mentor for emerging African writers in 2015. Motswana Africa, Dream Again earned Molosi a publication deal by Mantle Books for We Are All Blue, Motswana: Africa, Dream Again and Blue, Black and White in 2012. Molosi's Broadway credits include Motswana: Africa, Dream Again (2012) and Damn Yankees (2004). His Hollywood engagements which are not limited to A United Kingdom (2016) with David Oyelowo, Given (2009), Green Zone (2007), with Academy-Award winner Matt Damon, and Breakfast in Hollywood (2006), with award-winning actor Paul Boocock of Law & Order, is expanding his acting career.

In a 2012 interview with the BBC, Molosi described his work as "critical love letters" to humanity. The New York Times has considered Molosi's acts as "inflamed with passion," especially his captivating portrayal of a Ugandan child soldier in his one-man show, No Idea 2010. Molosi won the 50 Golden Jubilee under 40 Awards organised by Gabz FM and Mail & Guardian in 2016 for his stellar contribution to the Nation for Arts and Culture. He was also honoured in 2014 as one of the 40 most influential people under 40 in Botswana in St. Louis 40 Under 40 List for his Blue, Black and White play. Blue, Black and White stands according to the Botswana Guardian as the longest-running one-man show in the history of Botswana. Similarly, Molosi was honoured by the National University of Taiwan and the Federation of European Carnival Cities.

The accolades of Blue, Black and White is ever expanding as Molosi reprised his role as Sir Seretse Khama off-Broadway in November 2014 where he was honoured for his contributions to off-Broadway's United Solo, the world's largest solo theatre festival. Currently in Africa, Molosi's Blue, Black and White play is being performed in arts festivals in Botswana and Zimbabwe. Molosi runs his own theatre company called Folktale Theatre Company, premised on giving Batswana youth a creative outlet and he has been dedicated to promoting GAMBIT: Newer African Writing, an anthology of African short stories in which Molosi's Back To Love is published. Additionally, a New York City publishing company, Mantle Books has published Molosi's anthology. His anthology has earned the praises of renowned African writers such as Chika Unigwe and Helon Habila.

Molosi's documentary We Are All Blue premiered on Africa Day, on 25 May 2017. The following day it debuted throughout Africa on Multichoice DStv. This documentary carries the last televised interview with the late former President of Botswana Sir Ketumile Masire. The documentary has since premiered at Ditshwanelo Human Rights Festival 2017 and made its debut in the cinema on 17 August 2017 in conjunction with the Dalai Lama's first visit to Botswana. The conference was about Ubuntu/Botho, an African way of life that the documentary explores in modern Botswana.

Molosi wrote "We Have Known Ironies" piece in Saraba Magazine in 2011 to shed light on African diversity through multiple narratives that debunk the misconception of Africa as a monolithic block. He delivered a keynote address at Bucknell University Pennsylvania's Black History Month on the theme of Postcolonial African Performance as an Archive in 2012. In January 2017, Molosi's "Dear Upright Africa" was published online and it called for the inclusion of African history in the African classroom. In March 2017, he was invited to TEDxGaborone, where he expanded his grand idea of African History inclusion in school curriculum starting from Botswana and extending across Africa. Subsequently, he officially delegated the Upright African Movement on 19 August in Gaborone, Botswana during the Mind and Life Dialogue with the 14th Dalai Lama. The Upright African movement is a campaign to raise awareness about the absence of African history in the African classrooms. Through inter-generational dialogue with leaders, influencers and members of the public in Africa and around the world, the movement seeks to facilitate the necessary conversations and actions toward the ideal of a liberated African curriculum.

Molosi is a polyglot with fluency in Setswana, Swahili, French and English. He is conversational in Zulu and Ndebele, and understands Kalanga. He picked a bit of Tamil and Hindi while at Tamilnadu India as a summer teacher of theatre for children with disabilities. In addition to writing and acting, Molosi sings and writes songs.

== Theatre ==
Year	Title	Role	Notes
2003	Fragments	Multiple	also Writer
2008	Blue, Black and White	Seretse Khama	also Writer
2010	Today It's Me	Philly Lutaaya	also Writer
2012	Motswana: Africa Dream Again	Multiple	also Writer
2017	Tumultuous	Not in U.S.	also Writer
2017	Yaguine and Fode project	Yaguine	–
2017	Black Man Samurai	Director	Also Writer

== Filmography ==
Year	Title	Role	Notes
2016	A United Kingdom	Supporting Role	
2009	Given	Supporting Role	
2007	Green Zone	Supporting Role	
2006	Breakfast in Hollywood	Supporting Role	

== Awards and honours ==
Year	Award	Category/Work	Result
2016	50 Golden Jubilee under 40 Awards Gabz FM and Mail & Guardian	"Contribution to the Nation for Arts and Culture"	Won
2015	Short Story Day Africa Prize	"Beetroot Salad"	Won
2015	Bessie Head Short Story Awards	"The Biggest Continent"	Won
2015	United Solo Theatre Festival Special Mention Honor	"Actor with the most off-Broadway solo appearances since 2010"	Honoured
2014	KBL St Louis Top 40 Under 40 Awards	"The 40 most influential young people in Botswana"	Honoured
2014	Federation of European Carnival Cities	"Best International Performer"	Won
2013	Dilling Yang Prize	"Excellence in Playwriting"	Won
2012	Robert Potter Playwriting Award	"Today It's Me"	Won
2011	United Solo Theatre Festival The coveted Best Actor Award	"Blue, Black and White"	Won
2011	United Solo Theatre Festival Best Solo Award off-Broadway	"Blue, Black and White"	Won
2009	Ruth Scott Memorial Prize in Theatre	"Excellence in Theatre"	Won
2009	Florence H. Chandler Fellowship	"Excellence in Theatre"	Won
2009	Dialogue ONE Festival Massachusetts	Best Actor "Blue, Black and White"	Won
2009	Sanford Prize	"Excellence in Playwriting"	Won
2003	Khama Brilliant Spirit Prestigious Presidential Award]	"Contribution to the arts in Botswana"	Won
