= Christopher Hewitt Award =

Annual literary award

The Christopher Hewitt Award is an annual literary award given each June by A&U magazine for writing that addresses or relates to HIV/AIDS. One award is given in each of four categories: fiction, poetry, creative nonfiction, and drama. Awards were first given in 2013. The winners for 2013 were Lisa Sandlin (fiction), Dorothy Alexander (poetry), Terry Dugan (creative nonfiction), and Evan Guilford-Blake (drama).

A&U (originally, Art & Understanding) was established in 1991 as a response to the ongoing loss of members of the creative community due to HIV/AIDS and as a forum for documenting their work. Today, the nonprofit magazine focuses on a variety of aspects of the global pandemic—including advocacy, prevention, and care—in addition to literature and the arts. Notable artists, activists, and writers are interviewed and featured in each issue. Examples include Anjelica Huston, Janet Jackson, Tony Kushner, George Takei, and Lupe Ontiveros.

The award was initiated by Brent Calderwood, A&U's literary editor from 2011 to 2015, along with Chael Needle, A&U's editor. It was named for Christopher Hewitt (1946–2004), who served as A&U's first literary editor. Born in Worcestershire, England, Hewitt immigrated to the United States in 1974. His poems and translations appeared in The New Yorker, American Poetry Review, The Advocate, The James White Review, BENT, and in the anthology Queer Crips: Disabled Gay Men Tell Their Stories. At the time of his death at the age of fifty-eight, he was working on a memoir titled “Brittle Bones,” in part about living with osteogenesis imperfecta.

== Winners ==
Christopher Hewitt Award Winners 2020

- Nonfiction: “The Handsomest Man in New York” by Patrick Mulcahey
- Drama: “The Toe Incident” by Katherine Gleason
- Poetry: “It Was Never Supposed to Be Ours” by Ben Kline
- Fiction: “Soul Cowboy” by Cris Eli Blak

Christopher Hewitt Award Winners 2019

- Nonfiction: “How Online Dating Empowers Women with HIV” by Claire Gasamagera
- Drama: “My Darling Love” by Joe Gulla
- Poetry: “Elegy for Ken Meeks” by Travis Chi Wing Lau
- Fiction: No winning entry

Christopher Hewitt Award Winners 2018

- Nonfiction: “The Custody Visit (1987)” by Andrea Laiacona Dooley
- Drama: “Nancy F@&*ing Reagan” by Daniel Hurewitz
- Poetry: “San Francisco General” by Greg Casale
- Fiction: “The Pond” by John Whittier Treat

Christopher Hewitt Award Winners 2017

- Nonfiction: “We Blessed” by John Boucher
- Drama: “The War Years” by Charles Stephens
- Poetry: No winning entry
- Fiction: “The Love Whisperer” by Raymond Luczak

Christopher Hewitt Award Winners 2016

- Nonfiction: “Save Tonight” by Jennifer Sembler
- Drama: No winning entry
- Poetry: “Days of 1993, ’94, and ’95” by Benjamin S. Grossberg
- Fiction: “Albert’s Prayer” by Marie Esposito

Christopher Hewitt Award Winners 2015

- Nonfiction: “Long-Term Survivor” by Victoria Noe
- Drama: No winning entry
- Poetry: “At the LGBT History Museum in San Francisco…” by Sean Patrick Mulroy (tied with) “New New Colossus” by Noah Stetzer
- Fiction: “Drowned River” by Dale Corvino

Christopher Hewitt Award Winners 2014

- Nonfiction: “Voicing That Inner Scream: Visibility and AIDS in LGBT Africa” by Nick Hadikwa Mwaluko
- Drama: No winning entry
- Poetry: “Building Immunities” by Stephen Mead
- Fiction: “After the Cure” by Stephen S. Mills

Christopher Hewitt Award Winners 2013

- Nonfiction: “Like Taking Blood from a Baby” by Terry Dugan
- Drama: “Cowboy Nocturne” by Evan Guilford-Blake
- Poetry: “Trip to Wyuka” by Dorothy Alexander
- Fiction: “Greyhound, 1984” by Lisa Sandlin
