= Lost (2001 TV series) =

Reality television series

Lost is a reality television show screened in the United States and United Kingdom in late 2001. It is a race format where teams are placed around the world with few or no resources and have to travel their way back to a "finish line" location.

== Premise ==
The premise was similar to The Amazing Race, except the three two-member teams knew only the final destination (thousands of miles away) and were given only a backpack full of clothes and other essentials. In addition, team members were not acquainted with one another prior to the show and were assigned to teams. Contestants were blindfolded and dropped off with a single camera person in a remote location of an unknown country to find their way back to their home country.

== American version ==
Lost
- Starring: Carla Antonino; Dan Wells; Laurie Zink; Joe Gulla
- Narrated by: Al Trautwig
- Country of origin: United States
- Original language: English
- No. of seasons: 1
- No. of episodes: 6

Production
- Executive producers: David Dugan; Nancy Stern
- Running time: 60 min.
- Production companies: Conaco; NBC Studios

Original release
- Network: NBC
- Release: 4 September – 30 December 2001

The American version of the show was produced by Conaco, a production company owned by Conan O'Brien. Sports broadcaster Al Trautwig was the narrator.

=== Format ===
Teams were given no money until they managed to figure out what country they were in. During the first set, the teams were abandoned in Mongolia. In the second set, the teams were abandoned in Bolivia. It was revealed in the second set that there was more to the show than just getting to the destination. The contestants had to go back via a particular island, making the quest more arbitrary. The first team to reach the U.S. finish line at the Statue of Liberty in New York City would split U.S. $200,000.

=== Episodes ===
==== First set ====
First drop-off:

- Carla and Lando – winners
- Celeste and Tami – second place
- Courtland and Joe – dropped out/didn't complete

Contestants

- Carla, 29, make-up artist, Stoughton, MA
- Celeste, 29, Fashion Designer, Los Angeles, CA
- Courtland, 29, painting contractor, Foxboro, MA
- Lando, 24, Student/waiter, Nashville, TN
- Joe, 36, Graphic Designer, San Jose, CA
- Tami, 36, Married mother of four and part-time interior designer, Piedmont, CA

==== Second set ====
Second drop-off:

- Dan and Laurie – winners
- Fred and Bob
- Donna and Veronica

Contestants

- Bob, 59, Ex-police officer
- Dan, 27, Investment Banker
- Donna, 29, Waitress
- Fred, 22, College Student
- Laurie, 22, Recent college grad, California
- Veronica, 41, Business Owner

=== Broadcast ===
With the show premiering to dismal ratings, only two of the three sets of three episodes were produced; NBC blamed the lackluster numbers on the show debuting just before the September 11, 2001, attacks. The first set debuted on 4 September 2001. The winners from the first set were announced on the final episode, airing a week later than scheduled (due to the 9/11 attacks pre-empting the airing of the second episode). While the second set was set to debut the next week, NBC put the show on hiatus. On 23 December 2001, the second set of episodes began airing on NBC in a new 7:00 p.m. ET Sunday timeslot. Although the final two episodes of the second set were initially scheduled to air in a two-hour block the following week, NBC decided to skip the second episode of the set, and only aired the final episode in a one-hour timeslot, due to the previous episode having one of the lowest ratings in the network's history.

The series debuted the night before The Amazing Race on rival CBS.

== British version ==
Lost
- Narrated by: Mat Fraser
- Theme music composer: Daniel Pemberton
- Country of origin: United Kingdom
- Original language: English
- No. of series: 1
- No. of episodes: 15

Production
- Executive producer: David Dugan
- Producer: Robert Davis
- Running time: 30 minutes
- Production company: Windfall Films

Original release
- Network: Channel 4
- Release: 1 October – 31 October 2001

The British version of the show was produced for Channel 4 by Windfall Films and shown in October 2001. In the United Kingdom, the show was narrated by Mat Fraser.

=== Format ===
Five sets of three episodes were broadcast in which teams were abandoned in the Solovetsky Islands in Northwest Russia, Mali in West Africa near Timbuktu, near Mount Roraima in Venezuela, the province of Quebec in Canada, and the former Soviet republic of Azerbaijan. The UK teams had to race back to Nelson's Column in Trafalgar Square, London, except in the final race from Azerbaijan, where the destination was the Angel of the North statue in Gateshead. The first team to arrive at the destination in each race won a prize of £5,000. The winning team from each race was brought back to compete again the following week as returning champions. They compete against two new teams. A 320-paged book detailing the series, written by Nikki Arend (wife of producer Robert Davis), accompanied the series.

Each team member and camera person was provided at the start with three days' food and water and a small amount of money. In the first two races the participants were given U.S. $200 cash each. For the third race from Venezuela the funds were in the form of an amount of gold and uncut diamonds roughly equivalent to £150. In the fourth race the cash was reduced to U.S. $150. For the final race from Azerbaijan the funds were reduced again, to only $80.

=== Episodes ===
==== 1 to 3 ====
DROP 1: Anzer, one of the Solovetsky islands in Russia, making up the Solovki archipelago in the White Sea, 150 km from the Arctic Circle. Their final destination was Nelson's Column, Trafalgar Square, London. This, the series pilot, was filmed between 26 August and 2 September 2000.

Results

- 1st place: Melissa ('Mel') Moore (aged 22, from Manchester) and Ruth Wagstaff (aged 33, from Liverpool) with cameraman Alastair Cook (aged 29). They won the race by reaching Nelson's Column in Trafalgar Square, London, on day 7.
- 2nd place: Camron ('Herbtree') John (aged 40, from London) and Tom Lawton (aged 24, from Somerset) with cameraman Neil Harvey (aged 33).
- 3rd place: Charlie McFall (aged 38, from London) and Sarah Hemming (aged 25, from Wales) with cameraman Matt Broad (aged 34).

==== 4 to 6 ====
DROP 2: Sahara desert, north of Timbuktu, Mali, West Africa. Once the teams determined which country they had been dropped off in, they were instructed to make their way to Dakar, Senegal, where they would be given onward flights to an undisclosed destination (Casablanca, Morocco). Their final destination was Nelson's Column, Trafalgar Square, London.

Results

- 1st place: James Maby (aged 28, from London / France) and Harriet Bulwer-Long (aged 23, from London) with cameraman Will Dawes (aged 32). They won the race by reaching Nelson's Column in Trafalgar Square, London, on day 9.
- 2nd place: Nana Amoatemaa-Appiah (aged 29, from London) and Stuart Lewington (aged 26, from Middlesex) with cameraman Luke Menges (aged 31).
- Abandoned race: Melissa ('Mel') Moore (aged 22, from Manchester) and Ruth Wagstaff (aged 33, from Liverpool), the winners of Drop 1, with cameraman Iain MacDonald (aged 30). They abandoned the race in Casablanca, Morocco, on day 12, on being told by British Airways staff in Casablanca that the other two teams had begged for and received free flights to London some days earlier (James and Harriet from Malaga, Spain; Nana and Stuart from Casablanca). Mel and Ruth had the most authentic journey, travelling the entire route as far as Dakar over land, unlike both other teams who undertook most of the journey on free flights (resulting in a ban on flights not expressly authorised by the production team in subsequent drops).

==== 7 to 9 ====
DROP 3: La Gran Sabana (The Grand Savannah), Venezuela. Once the teams determined which country they had been dropped off in, they were instructed to make their way to the Caribbean island of Martinique, West Indies, where they would be given partial funds for flights back to the United Kingdom. Their final destination was Nelson's Column, Trafalgar Square, London.

Results

- 1st place: James Maby (aged 28, from London / France) and Harriet Bulwer-Long (aged 23, from London), the winners of Drop 2, with cameraman Simon Egan (aged 34). They won the race by reaching Nelson's Column in Trafalgar Square, London, on day 14.
- 2nd place: Kate Andrews (aged 24, from London) and Elizabeth ('Liz') Hoselitz (aged 24, from Bristol), with cameraman Phil Stebbing (aged 40).
- Abandoned race: Clay Pegus (aged 29, from London) and Andrew ('Andy') Boon (aged 36, from London), with cameraman Ben Anthony (aged 33). They abandoned the race on the Caribbean island of Margarita, on day 11, at the prospect of facing a long boat journey in a confined unhygienic space.

==== 10 to 12 ====
DROP 4: Near St Augustin, Cote-Nord, Eastern Quebec, Canada. Once the teams determined which country they had been dropped off in, they were instructed to make their way to Venice Beach, Los Angeles, USA, to collect partial funds for tickets to return to the United Kingdom. Their final destination was Nelson's Column, Trafalgar Square, London.

Results

- 1st place: Katherine ('Mags') Allen (aged 27, from Leeds) and Paul Riley (aged 34, from London), with cameraman Dimitri Doganis (aged 29). They won the race by reaching Nelson's Column in Trafalgar Square, London, on day 12.
- 2nd place: James Maby (aged 28, from London / France), the winner of Drops 2 & 3, and Sarah Laing (aged 22, from London), with cameraman Misha Manson-Smith (aged 28). Harriet Bulwer-Long, who, with James Maby, won Drops 2 & 3, declined to participate in Drop 4 due to work commitments and was replaced by Sarah Laing.
- 3rd place: Suo San ('Suz') Tsang (aged 27, from Colchester, Essex) and Rehan ('Ray') Ali (aged 32, from Manchester), with cameraman Tim Knight (aged 33).

==== 13 to 15 ====
DROP 5: Near Siazan in northern Azerbaijan. Once the teams determined which country they had been dropped off in, they were instructed to make their way to Baku (the capital of Azerbaijan). On reaching Baku, they were then instructed to travel via Iran into Turkey (because, of the countries bordering Azerbaijan, they were only provided with visas for Iran whilst in Baku). From Turkey the teams could choose their own route back to the United Kingdom. Use of international flights was not permitted, and neither was obtaining assistance from family and friends (the latter condition being applied after teams obtained help, including financial help, from family and friends during Drop 4). In a change from all previous drops, their final destination in Drop 5 was The Angel of the North, in Gateshead, Tyne and Wear, England.

Results

- 1st place: Katherine ('Mags') Allen (aged 27, from Leeds) and Paul Riley (aged 34, from London), the winners of Drop 4, with cameraman Finn McGough (aged 29). They won the race by reaching The Angel of the North, in Gateshead, Tyne and Wear, on day 10.
- 2nd place: Sharon Singh (aged 22, from Liverpool) and Henrietta ('Henri') Tatham (aged 32, from London), with cameraman Barnaby ('Barney') Snow (aged 35).
- Abandoned race: Paul ('Paul-Stuart') Robertson (aged 22, from Glasgow) and Bruce Fraser (aged 37, from Wisbech), with cameraman Ben Anthony (aged 33). They abandoned the race in Istanbul, Turkey, on day 8, because Paul-Stuart decided he did not wish to continue.

=== Broadcast ===
Scheduling of the program in a late-night slot meant it reached only a limited audience. The British version was repeated on a cable channel a few months after the first showing.
