= Sheer Dallas =

American television series

- Narrated by: Larry Hagman

Original release
- Network: The Learning Channel
- Release: 2005

Sheer Dallas is a 2005 television reality show about the eccentric lives of people in Dallas, Texas. It is aired by the cable network The Learning Channel. Some characters included Steve Kemble, Brooke Webster (Miss Dallas County 2005) and Charlie Price (who has gone on to open "Hair by Charlie" a successful Dallas salon). The show was narrated by Larry Hagman, who played J.R. Ewing on Dallas.
