= Playing It Straight =

2004 reality television series

- Title card
- Genre: Reality television
- Created by: Ciara Byrne; Kim MacQuarrie
- Presented by: Daphne Brogdon
- Country of origin: United States
- Original language: English
- No. of seasons: 1
- No. of episodes: 8

Production
- Executive producers: Jeremy Mills; Ciara Byrne
- Production location: Elko, Nevada
- Running time: 41–42 minutes
- Production company: Lion Television

Original release
- Network: Fox
- Release: March 12 – March 26, 2004

Playing It Straight is an American reality television series broadcast by the Fox Broadcasting Company (Fox). The series premiered on March 12, 2004, although it was prematurely cancelled by the network following the broadcast of its third episode on March 26, 2004. Set at the Sizzling Saddle Ranch in Elko, Nevada, the series depicted fourteen men who attempted to pursue a romantic relationship with college student Jackie Thomas. However, this group of suitors was split between men who were either straight or gay. Through a series of group activities and one-on-one dates, Thomas was required to eliminate men from the competition who she believed identified as gay. If the final suitor was a straight man, he and Thomas split a reward of $1 million. Conversely, if the final suitor was a gay man, he alone won the reward. The series was hosted by American television presenter Daphne Brogdon.

Playing It Straight was a part of Fox's intent to capitalize on a rising interest in LGBT-themed reality television shows. The series' format was inspired by The Bachelor, with the addition of an LGBT-related twist. Playing It Straight was met with criticism from many television critics, who claimed that it reinforced stereotypes and promoted a negative portrayal of gay men. The series premiered to modest ratings, which declined with the broadcast of subsequent episodes. Following its mid-season cancellation, Fox released the full series on their website on a pay-per-view basis. The cancellation of Playing It Straight caused some network executives to reevaluate their own LGBT-related television shows. The series spawned adaptations in Australia, the Netherlands, and the United Kingdom.

== Format ==
Bachelorette Jackie Thomas (center) surrounded by her straight and gay suitors

Set in Elko, Nevada, at the Sizzling Saddle Ranch, the series followed Jackie Thomas, a 21-year-old college student from Wisconsin, as she was pursued by a group of fourteen men. Upon arrival to the ranch, Thomas learned that the group was composed of both straight and gay men; all of the gay men attempted to pass as straight throughout the course of the competition. Thomas was required to discern which of the men identified as gay; she made her determinations based on observations from a series of individual and group dates. These dates included activities such as shopping trips and swimsuit competitions. At the end of each week, Jackie was required to eliminate two men from the competition who she believed to be gay. Following their elimination, each man had the opportunity to disclose their sexual orientation and explain their reason for participating in the series. If Thomas ultimately selected a straight man at the end of the competition, then the two split a reward of $1,000,000. Conversely, if Thomas selected a gay man at the end of the competition, then he alone won the reward. The series was hosted by American television presenter Daphne Brogdon.

== Production ==
=== Conception and development ===
In February 2003, Kim MacQuarrie and Ciara Byrne were asked by Lion Television to come up with five proposals for a reality television series for the Fox Broadcasting Company (Fox). MacQuarrie and Byrne had five days to submit their proposals, with the pair "rack[ing] our brains for reality series ideas that might be fun, rather than the dramatic series that were currently on television." After ten days of deliberation, Fox selected the pair's fourth proposal, a dating series that revolved around one woman and fourteen men, some of whom were gay.

Production for Playing It Straight began in mid-2003 under the working title Who Will She Choose? The series took approximately ten months to design, cast, film, and produce. All crew, staff, and contestants were required to sign non-disclosure agreements in the amount of $5 million.

According to Mike Darnell, the gay men underwent some training in order to appear more convincingly straight.

According to Thomas, she and the suitors had one hour to decide after the revelation of the twist if they wanted to proceed with the show.

Variety initially reported that the series was a potential cover for a new season of the reality dating show Joe Millionaire.

To further promote the show, Fox released a deck of cards with trivia questions designed to test one's gaydar.

In 2005, nearly one year later after the show was recorded, Fox issued a press release stating that Jackie and Banks were still together. After the show, Jackie and Banks dated for about two years. For the first eight months, they had to keep their relationship quiet until the show aired. Banks went so far as to tell friends that he had to leave the show because he broke his arm, rather than reveal he won.

=== Filming ===
Playing It Straight was filmed at Red's Ranch in Elko, Nevada; however, it was renamed Sizzling Saddles Ranch for the series. According to MacQuarrie, he intentionally chose to film the series at Red's Ranch. He stated: "It was filmed on Red's Ranch ... because I grew up in Nevada, but also so that we could have fun taking 14 greenhorns—gay and straight—to a place where they would all be 'fish out of water.'"

== Contestants ==
Name	Occupation	Sexual orientation	Episodes							
Name	Occupation	Sexual orientation	1	2	3	4	5	6	7	8
Banks	Software Consultant	Straight	SAFE	SAFE	SAFE	SAFE	SAFE	SAFE		WINNER
Sharif	Musician	Straight	SAFE	SAFE	SAFE	SAFE	SAFE	SAFE		RUNNER-UP
Chris	Retired Entrepreneur	Gay	SAFE	SAFE	SAFE	SAFE	SAFE	SAFE		RUNNER-UP
Bill	Event Promoter	Gay	SAFE	SAFE	SAFE	SAFE	SAFE	OUT		
Luciano	Personal Trainer	Gay	SAFE	SAFE	SAFE	SAFE	OUT			
Bradley	Bartender	Gay	SAFE	SAFE	SAFE	SAFE	OUT			
Lee	Financial Consultant	Gay	SAFE	SAFE	SAFE	OUT				
John	Bartender	Gay	SAFE	SAFE	SAFE	OUT				
Chad	Corporate Communications	Gay	SAFE	SAFE	OUT					
Eddie	School Teacher	Gay	SAFE	SAFE	QUIT					
Ryan	Waiter	Straight	SAFE	OUT						
Alex	Law Student	Gay	SAFE	OUT						
Louis	Brokerage Firm Manager	Straight	OUT							
Gust	Real Estate Agent	Straight	OUT							

The contestant was safe from elimination.
The contestant was eliminated from the competition.
The contestant quit the competition.
The contestant was not up for elimination.

== Episodes ==
No.	Title	Original release date	US viewers (millions)
1	"Episode 1"	March 12, 2004	5.3
Jackie arrives at the Sizzling Saddle Ranch and meets her 14 suitors.
2	"Episode 2"	March 18, 2004	3.8
Jackie and her suitors go square dancing.
3	"Episode 3"	March 26, 2004	3.1
Jackie and her suitors go on an overnight camping trip. Tensions begin to rise among several of the men.
4	"Episode 4"	Unaired	N/A
Jackie and her suitors go on a trip to Las Vegas.
5	"Episode 5"	Unaired	N/A
The suitors partake in an arm-wrestling competition, resulting in an injury.
6	"Episode 6"	Unaired	N/A
As tensions continue to rise, several suitors attempt to out their competition.
7	"Episode 7"	Unaired	N/A
Jackie goes on separate dates with the remaining suitors in an effort to determine who is gay.
8	"Episode 8"	Unaired	N/A
With three suitors remaining, Jackie makes her final decision.

== Broadcast history and release ==
In the United States, the show premiered on March 12, 2004, on Fox. It aired Fridays at 8:00 pm Eastern Standard Time (EST) as a lead-in to Wonderfalls.

Its second episode was broadcast on March 18 while its third episode was broadcast on March 29, 2004. After its third episode, Fox removed the show from its schedule due to struggling ratings. It was replaced on Fox' schedule with reruns of Totally Outrageous Behavior and World's Craziest Videos. Fox initially claimed it would broadcast the show's five remaining episodes during the summer season; however, Fox's entertainment president Gail Berman later announced that the show was canceled. Berman claimed that the network would provide "any viewer that needs the information with the information of the conclusion." In July 2004, Fox posted synopses of the unaired episodes on its website. On January 17, 2005, Fox released the entire show on their website on a pay-per-view basis.

Despite the network's claimed reason, Jackie disputed the reason for the series' cancellation. She stated: "I can’t say it was cancelled due to ratings. It aired on Fridays, and no shows have been successful on Fridays ... [Fox] blamed it on the ratings, but I think it may have been something deeper."

== Reception ==
=== Television viewership and ratings ===
Playing It Straight premiered to modest ratings, in which it received 5.3 million viewers. It was the highest-rated program of the night among several demographics, including adults 18–34, persons 12–34, teens and men 18–34. The series averaged 3.9 million viewers and a 1.7 rating/6 share among adults 18-49 over the course of its three-week run.

=== Critical response ===
The show received a negative reception from television critics.

Frank Rich of The New York Times claimed that the show "cast gay men as villains by having them pretend to be heterosexual for the purpose of humiliating women." Conversely, The Guardian's Lauren Henderson positively noted the show's representation of LGBTQ people on television.

Dana Stevens of Slate criticized the series for portraying gay men as "romantic pariahs." She further commented: "[N]ot only is Playing It Straight ideologically offensive, it’s also colossally boring."

=== Cultural impact ===
The mid-season cancellation of Playing It Straight had an impact on other LGBT-related programming. Seriously, Dude, I'm Gay, another Fox produced LGBT-related reality television special, was set to air on June 7, 2004, although it was abruptly removed from the Fox schedule only eleven days before its airdate. An "insider" at Fox claimed that the underperformance of Playing It Straight was a significant factor in the special's cancellation, as it caused the network to "believe the gay reality phenomenon was on the wane." The producers of the TBS series He's a Lady viewed Playing It Straight—in addition to Boy Meets Boy and Seriously, Dude, I'm Gay—as an example of the "potential pitfalls" to avoid when producing an LGBT-themed show. The underperformance and cancellations of these series resulted in executive producers Douglas Ross and Tommy Campbell consulting GLAAD for review of He's a Lady.

== Adaptations ==
Adaptations of the series premiered in Australia, the United Kingdom, and the Netherlands. In the Netherlands, an adaptation titled Herken de Homo (Dutch; the English title is Recognize the Gay) premiered on January 4, 2005, on RTL 5. The series, which was hosted by Dutch television presenter Fiona Hering, was broadcast for a single season. Filmed in Mexico, the series followed Nathalie Biermanns, a 23-year-old actor, as she competed for a €50,000 (US$55,229). She had to choose between 14 men. At the end, only Marcel remained who turned out to be straight. Both Biermanns and Marcel won €50,000 (US$55,229) each.

An Australian version of the show aired on the Seven Network starting October 2004 hosted by Natalie Garonzi. Despite much of the hype surrounding it the shows ratings dwindled and it was moved to a later timeslot. After Rebecca eliminated Campbell (who was gay) Chad, Dane and Evan were left for one non-elimination round before appearing in the final episode. Rebecca chose Chad and he was revealed to be straight.

The Australian show has also aired in the US on FOX Reality.

The series was adapted for the United Kingdom, in which it aired for two seasons. The first season premiered on April 8, 2005, as part of the network's Twisted Dating Season. The series was set on a Mexican ranch and Zoe Hardman is spending time with 12 men. Ten men started the show and two more, Lee and Marco, were added in week 3 - it was revealed when they arrived that one was gay and one was straight. The prize money was £100,000 and the show was hosted by June Sarpong. The series has been repeated on Channel 4's sister channel, 4Music.

Early reporting revealed Ben Harris to be Mr Gay UK and also said: "Ben Harris, a builder, looks to be one of the favourites to win the show after the first episode in which he played to the builder stereotype."

In October 2011, it was announced that Channel 4 had ordered a full second series. This time the location was set in Spain and the new series was hosted by T4 presenter, Jameela Jamil and comedian Alan Carr provided the narration. The prize fund was decreased 50% to £50,000 (£25,000 each). The second series made its debut on 9 January 2012 at 9pm on E4. The series was set at a Spanish hacienda - Hacienda de los Hombres. The series was also aired on Channel 4's teen-strand, T4 on Saturdays.
