= Bantu Film Festival =

- Location: Gaborone, Botswana
- Founded: 2022
- Website: https://sites.google.com/view/bantufilmfestival/home

An independent pan-African film festival based in Gaborone, Botswana. Co-founded by filmmaker Lesedi Mphothwe through her production company Butterscotch Productions, the festival is dedicated to promoting African cinema, supporting local and continental filmmakers, and positioning Botswana as a hub for pan-African storytelling. It is held annually and combines film screenings with workshops, masterclasses, and panel discussions.

== Background ==
The Bantu Film Festival was established with the aim of changing the climate of the film industry in Botswana by providing platforms that nurture growth, collaboration, innovation, and creativity among local filmmakers and corporate entities. Its programming model combines film screenings curated from across Africa and the diaspora, practical masterclasses and workshops for both emerging and established filmmakers, and panel discussions featuring film industry experts sharing knowledge relevant to the African filmmaking context. The festival also aims to attract international buyers and distributors to Botswana, with the long-term vision of becoming a key driver in building an internationally recognised local film industry.

== Editions ==
=== First edition (2022) ===
The inaugural edition of the Bantu Film Festival was held in 2022. Co-founder Lesedi Mphothwe has described completing the festival's first edition as one of her greatest professional achievements, alongside the directorial debut of her short film Cell 10.

=== Second edition (2023) ===
The second edition of the festival was held in 2023 in Ramotswa, Botswana. Organisers described it as a bigger and better edition showcasing exceptional talent in African cinema.

=== Third edition (2024) ===
The third annual edition was held from 8 to 12 October 2024 at the New Capitol Cinema, Riverwalk, and the University of Botswana, under the theme Unifying Africa through Cinema. A total of 30 films were selected from various African countries, including three from Botswana spanning the drama, documentary, and short film genres. The festival opened with the local horror short film Seipone, directed by Princess Mokokwe and Wazwagwa Ntabeni. The program included film screenings, workshops, panel discussions, and a red carpet award ceremony.

The festival received sponsorship and support from the Okavango Diamond Company (ODC), whose representative described the event as a key driver for capacity building and economic development in Botswana's film sector, noting the industry's potential to attract investment, create employment, and contribute to GDP through film tourism.

=== Fourth Edition ===
The 4th edition of the Bantu Film Festival officially opened at New Capitol Cinema Masa in Gaborone, with filmmakers, actors, and emerging creatives gathering to celebrate African cinema. The opening night featured live performances from local artists including Baratani Ladies from Sikwane and spoken word performer Poeticblood. They have expanded from screening just 10 films at its inaugural edition to receiving 253 film submissions from 39 countries and have distributed 24 awards since its inception. The opening night screenings included the premiere of Children of Diaspora, a French film directed by Sabrina Onana exploring themes of identity, migration, and heritage, as well as a local short film titled Baratani (Hill of Lovers). Minister of Sports and Arts Jacob Kelebeng addressed attendees, urging creatives to use the platform to challenge prevailing industry narratives and announcing that the Ministry intended to table a cinematography bill as part of legislative reforms to address persistent challenges in the industry, including restricted access to funding and infrastructure. The Ugandan film Unheard also had a notable showing at the festival's awards night, taking home three of the night's most coveted prizes, with its producer and writer Polly Kamukama present to receive the honours.

== Awards ==
The Bantu Film Festival presents awards across multiple categories including Best Short Film, Best Documentary, Best Feature Film, Best Animation, Best Director, Best Cinematographer, Best Editor, Best Actor, Best Actress, Best Sound Designer, and an Honorable Mention Award.

== Beyond the festival ==
In addition to the annual festival, Bantu Film Festival has hosted standalone film screening events in partnership with other organizations. In March 2026, the festival co-hosted a screening of the Nigerian award-winning film I Too Crave Death at Mebala Studios in Gaborone in collaboration with I Am Woman 2Twoo. The event brought together parents and children to watch the film and engage in discussions about mental health, family dynamics, and grief.

The festival has also partnered internationally with the Human Rights Tattoo organization, which participated in the 2024 edition at the University of Botswana.

== Partners and supporters ==
Partners of the Bantu Film Festival have included the Okavango Diamond Company, the Ladima Foundation (a film and content initiative for women in Africa), the Namibia Film Commission, Kosinima Inc., Women in Film Botswana, the University of Botswana, the Botswana Film Association (BOFIA), the Botswana Screen Society (BOSS), Africa Film Producers, and Human Rights Tattoo.

The festival is listed on the African Film Festivals Platform and accepts international film submissions through FilmFreeway.
