= Lone Motsomi =

Lone Thabang Motsomi
- Born: Bokaa, Botswana
- Education: Master of Fine Arts in Dance Choreography & Production - Naijing University of the Arts, China
- Occupations: Stunt Double, Dancer, Actress
- Known for: The Woman King, Shaka iLembe
- Notable work: The Woman King
- Television: The Woman King, Shaka iLembe, Blood & Water

Lone Thabang Motsomi is a Motswana actress, dancer and performer. She is known for her role as one of the eight Agoji female warriors in the 2022 American historical action-adventure film,The Woman King.

== Early life and education ==
Lone Thabang Motsomi was born in Bokaa, and raised in Gaborone, Botswana. She studied at Moving Into Dance Academy in South Africa in 2017, where she pursued Level Q4 Certificate in Performing Arts. She later paused this programme to pursue Master's degree in Dance Choreography and Production in Nanjing, Jiangsu, Mainland China. She also holds a Degree in Interior Design.

== Career ==
=== Film and television ===
Woman King (2022)

In 2022, Motsomi was cast as one of the Agoji warriors in an American historical action-adventure film titled The Woman King. She appeared alongside Viola Davis, Thuso Mbedu and John Boyega.

Blood & Water (2024)

In 2024 Motsomi worked on the South African Netflix series Blood & Water as a stunt double for the lead character Puleng.

G20 (2025)

In this 2025 American action thriller film, Motsomi served as a stunt double for Marsai Martin, who played the role of the First daughter.

Shaka iLembe (2023 - 2025)

In 2023, Motsomi served as a stunt office personal assistant on the South African TV series Shaka iLembe. She also doubled in stunt sequences for lead actress Nomzamo Mbatha.

=== Theater ===
Lone Motsumi has also performed internationally, including on Broadway, where she performed in Pula!, a theater production play in which she was the lead dancer during her time with Mophato Dance Theatre in Botswana. She spent thirteen years with the theatre company and featured in numerous productions including Thari, a play that explores issues affecting women in Botswana.

== Filmography ==
Year	Film	Role
2022	Woman King	Agoji Warrior
2024	Blood & Water	Stunt double for Puleng
2023 - 2025	Shaka iLembe	Stunt double for Nomzamo Mbatha; Stunt office personal assistant
2025	G20	Stunt double for Marsai Martin
