= Downtown Urban Arts Festival =

- Genre: Arts festival
- Dates: Spring (exact dates vary each year)
- Location(s): New York City
- Country: United States
- Years active: 2002–present
- Founded: 2001
- Website: www.duafnyc.com

Downtown Urban Arts Festival (DUAF), formerly known as Downtown Urban Theater Festival, is an annual multi-disciplinary arts event held during the spring featuring theater, film, music and poetry at various venues in downtown Manhattan, New York City. It was inaugurated in 2002 as the Downtown Urban Theater Festival at the Here Arts Center in SoHo, New York City. In 2002, the festival was listed as one of the world's best festivals for new works. The festival is produced by Creative Ammo Inc., a nonprofit organization.
