= New Capitol Cinemas =

Cinema chain in Botswana

New Capitol Cinemas is a cinema chain in Botswana.

New Capitol Cinemas opened Botswana's first cineplex in 2002, as a four-screen cinema complex in the Riverwalk Shopping Mall in Gaborone East. In the same year, New Capitol Cinemas also opened a nine-screen cineplex at the Game Shopping Mall in Gaborone West. One of the consortium members was Rizwan K. Desai, son of Abdul Kadir Desai, the businessman who had earlier owned the Capitol Cinema in the Mall.

In 2017 another New Capitol Cinemas was announced, at the Acacia Mall in Phakalane. A Platinum Lounge, delivering restaurant food to cinema-goers, was opened there in 2019.
