= Women in Film Guild Botswana =

- Abbreviation: WIF Botswana
- Formation: 2021
- Location: Gaborone, Botswana
- Fields: Film, television, gender equality, creative industry
- Key people: Serena Mmifinyana (Vice-Chair, co-founder); Nikita Mokgware (Chair, co-founder)
- Website: wifbotswana.org

Women in Film Guild Botswana (WIF Botswana) is a Botswana-based professional guild dedicated to assisting, educating, and empowering women working in the film and television industry. It was co-founded in 2021 by Serena Mmifinyana and Nikita Mokgware, both graduates of film-related program who came together with the goal of penetrating a male-dominated industry. The organization is affiliated with Women in Film & Television International (WIFTI), and its Vice-Chair, Serena Mmifinyana, was elected to the WIFTI Board of Directors in 2022 the first Botswana representative to hold such a position and became secretary of the global organization in 2023.

== Background and founding ==
WIF Botswana was established in 2021 by a group of young women who had graduated mostly from film-related academic program. The founders sought to create a platform for women in Botswana's creative sector to connect, learn from each other, and collectively build a stronger presence in an industry where women remained underrepresented. Co-founders Serena Mmifinyana and Nikita Mokgware have served as the organization's Chair and Vice-Chair respectively since its inception.

In early 2023, the guild held a public event dubbed the Creative Café at the University of Botswana, where it introduced itself to the broader creative industry, shared its vision, and created space for industry professionals to exchange ideas on collective growth and support.

== WIFTI affiliation and international recognition ==
From around mid-2022, WIF Botswana's efforts attracted international attention when co-founder Serena Mmifinyana was elected to the Board of Directors of Women in Film & Television International (WIFTI), marking a first for Botswana. Shortly after, she was invited by Pavillon Afriques to speak at a roundtable during the 2023 Cannes Film Festival, with Nikita Mokgware accompanying her for guild networking purposes. Mmifinyana went on to become secretary of WIFTI in 2023.

== MTF connection ==
Serena Mmifinyana is a graduate of the MultiChoice Talent Factory (MTF) Southern Africa Academy, a pan-African film training program. She established WIF Botswana while working as a creative director at N&M Productions, a TV and film company. The MTF described her achievement in founding the guild and rising to WIFTI leadership as emblematic of the impact of structured film training on gender empowerment in Africa's creative industries.
