= United Solo Theatre Festival =

New York theater event

- Frequency: Annual
- Locations: Theatre Row; New York City
- Inaugurated: 2010
- Website: unitedsolo.org

United Solo Theatre Festival is the world's largest solo theatre festival. It takes place at Theatre Row on 42nd Street in New York City. Its founder and artistic director is Omar Sangare. The festival presents many categories of solo shows, including storytelling, puppetry, dance, multimedia, improvisations, stand-up, magic, drama, and comedy. Since its inaugural edition, the Festival raises money for The Actors Fund.

== 2010 season ==
The line-up of 47 solo shows was presented between November 8 and 21. The solo artists from three continents took part in the two-week festival. Four-time Academy Award nominee Marsha Mason presented awards at the closing ceremony, including the special uAward for Anna Deavere Smith.

== 2011 season ==
Submissions for the second edition opened on March 1 and on closed May 16, 2011. The festival began on October 20 and it was concluded with a Closing Ceremony on November 20. It took place in Theatre Row in New York City. The New York Times chose United Solo for its The New Season Fall Preview, and the Time Out New York gave the Festival a wild card.

In 2011, the United Solo board has nominated four performers for the uAward: Daniel Beaty in Through the Night, John Lithgow in Stories by Heart, Patti LuPone in The Gypsy in My Soul, and Robin Williams in Weapons of Self-Destruction. The 2011 uAward went to Patti LuPone.

== 2012 season ==
The third United Solo Festival presented 100 shows between October 11 - November 18, 2012. Nominees for the special uAward were Kathy Griffin, John Hurt, Hugh Jackman and John Leguizamo. The award went to John Leguizamo. Among other award winners were Lynn Marie Rink, Ann Morrison, Austin Pendleton and Bill Bowers.

United Solo received the title of the "Person of the Year 2012" from nytheatre.com.

== 2013 season ==
The 4th festival was held at Theatre Row in New York City between October 3 – November 24, 2013 and featured 120 productions from 23 countries and 6 continents, among them Gordon Clapp, Eric Roberts, Ann Morrison, and Alison Wearing. The special award went to Fiona Shaw, who accepted it during festival's closing ceremony on November 24.

== 2014 season ==
Over 130 participants will perform in the 5th anniversary season between September 18 – November 23, 2014. Artists will represent six continents. The festival will span over ten weeks, which is five times longer than in the inaugural year.

== United Solo Europe ==
Since 2013, United Solo invites selected performers to present their works at the festival's European showcase, among them Regina Advento of Tanztheater Wuppertal Pina Bausch and Fiona Shaw.
