= Gargoyles the Movie: The Heroes Awaken =

- Directed by: Saburo Hashimoto; Takamitsu Kawamura; Kazuo Terada
- Screenplay by: Michael Reaves
- Story by: Eric Luke; Michael Reaves
- Produced by: Frank Paur; Greg Weisman; Lisa A. Salamone
- Starring: Thom Adcox-Hernandez; Edward Asner; Jeff Bennett; Clancy Brown; J. D. Daniels; Keith David; Bill Fagerbakke; Jonathan Frakes; Patrick Fraley; Ed Gilbert; Peter Renaday; Salli Richardson; Marina Sirtis; Kath Soucie; Frank Welker
- Edited by: Susan Edmunson
- Music by: Carl Johnson
- Production company: Walt Disney Television Animation (Note: Animation outsourced to Walt Disney Animation Japan.)
- Distributed by: Buena Vista Home Video
- Release date: January 31, 1995
- Running time: 92 minutes
- Country: United States
- Language: English

Gargoyles the Movie: The Heroes Awaken is a 1995 American animated urban fantasy superhero film produced by Walt Disney Television Animation. The film consists of the five-episode pilot ("Awakening") of the animated television series Gargoyles edited into one long feature film, being roughly 92 minutes in length. As a result, numerous scenes from the original broadcast episodes were cut due to time constraints. In addition, a number of scenes were also moved around and some dialogue was changed. The episodes were produced and aired in 1994, and the film was released to laserdisc and VHS in February 1995 and featured an interactive VHS/LD board game. The pilot episodes have been released to DVD as part of Gargoyles: Season 1.

== Plot ==
In Scotland, 994 A.D., the gargoyles of Castle Wyvern repel an attack from Vikings, led by Hakon. Despite the gargoyles' efforts, they are largely viewed as monsters and treated with prejudice. The captain of the guard argues that the gargoyles deserve more praise and dignity, especially since the castle is built on top of the land that originally belonged to the gargoyles, but Goliath insists that they must endure being misunderstood and protect the castle and all of its residents.

Goliath and his older gargoyle mentor chase after the Vikings, but realize they were led into a diversion. Unable to return to the castle in time, the sun rises, forcing them back into stone sleep. The castle is once again attacked by Hakon and the Vikings, but the captain of the guard, disgusted by the scorn and prejudice of his people against the gargoyles, betrays the castle and Princess Katherine to the Vikings. Hakon destroys the gargoyles while they are helpless in their stone sleep.

Goliath and his mentor return home to find the castle in ruins and most of the gargoyles dead. Only three gargoyle youths and their hound survived due to Goliath previously telling them to remain in their caverns. Hakon taunts the court wizard Magus by passively burning pages from his magic book of spells, the Grimorum Arcanorum. When the surviving gargoyles confront the Vikings, Hakon and the Captain flee with Katherine. Magus, believing Katherine to be dead, casts a curse on the gargoyles. Goliath saves Katherine, but finds his clan in a permanent state of stone sleep. Because the pages from the Grimorum Arcanorum needed to break the spell were burned, the gargoyles will remain cursed until "the castle rises above the clouds". Goliath leaves his clan's eggs in the care of Katherine and Magus, then has Magus cast the spell on him so that he can remain with his clan and share their fate.

A thousand years later, in 1994, David Xanatos claims Castle Wyvern and has it reconstructed at the top of his skyscraper in New York City, breaking the curse. Goliath reunites with his clan, but they are shocked to awaken in a completely different world. Not long after their awakening, the castle is attacked by a group of armed commandos. The fight results in falling debris and damages to the streets below, causing police detective Elisa Maza to investigate the battle. She discovers Goliath and the gargoyles, but they manage to hesitantly befriend each other. The gargoyles decide to name themselves after various locations in New York and explore their new surroundings. The elder mentor names himself Hudson, while the young trio name themselves Brooklyn, Lexington, and Broadway, and their hound is named Bronx. Meanwhile, Xanatos reunites Goliath with his mate, who survived the massacre of their clan. Having earned their trust, Xanatos convinces the clan to retake important data discs that were supposedly stolen from him during the commando attack.

Elisa investigates the theft and reveals to Goliath that the commandos were employed by Xanatos, and that Xanatos has been manipulating Goliath. No longer needing the gargoyles, Xanatos sends a group of robotic gargoyles to destroy them, but the real gargoyles manage to fight back and destroy the unintelligent robots. Goliath's lover reveals that her name is Demona, and that she is conspiring with Xanatos, having grown to consider humanity her enemy. Goliath and the rest of the clan reject her desire to fight against the human race, and she decides that Goliath is also her enemy and tries to kill him. Elisa arrives just in time to intervene and tackles Demona. Demona and Elisa fall from the collapsing castle ledge, but Goliath catches and saves Elisa, while Demona disappears.

Enraged at this loss, Goliath attempts to kill Xanatos until Elisa convinces him not to, claiming that if he does, he would be no morally better than Demona. Xanatos is arrested for possession of stolen property and the few surviving gargoyles now accept their new lives in their new home in New York, with Elisa now their friend and confidante.

== Cast ==
- Thom Adcox Hernandez as Lexington
- Edward Asner as Hudson
- Jeff Bennett as Brooklyn, Magus, and Owen
- Clancy Brown as Hakon
- J. D. Daniels as Tom
- Keith David as Goliath
- Bill Fagerbakke as Broadway
- Jonathan Frakes as David Xanatos
- Patrick Fraley as Brendan
- Ed Gilbert as Captain
- Peter Renaday as Commander
- Salli Richardson as Elisa Maza
- Marina Sirtis as Demona
- Kath Soucie as Princess Katharine
- Frank Welker as Bronx

== Reception ==
TV Guide rated the film 2/4 stars. The reviewer called the art "acceptable" but said the style owes a debt to Batman: The Animated Series.
