= List of Gargoyles episodes =

Gargoyles is an animated television series that aired from October 24, 1994, to February 15, 1997. A total of 78 20-minute episodes of Gargoyles were produced. The first two seasons aired in The Disney Afternoon programming block, the third and final season aired on the Disney's One Saturday Morning block on ABC as Gargoyles: The Goliath Chronicles.

Although the first two seasons were considered successful, Gargoyles did not live up to Disney's expectations as a commercial rival to Warner Bros. Batman: The Animated Series. This result, combined with poor ratings for the third season, led Disney to cancel the series. The Goliath Chronicles aired its final episode on February 15, 1997.

== Series overview ==
Season	Episodes	Originally released		
Season	Episodes	First released	Last released	Network
1	13	October 24, 1994	February 3, 1995	Syndication
2	52	September 4, 1995	May 15, 1996	Syndication
3	13	September 7, 1996	February 15, 1997	ABC

== Episodes ==
=== Season 1 (1994–95) ===
The first season premiered with the five-part pilot episode "Awakening," and consisted of a total of thirteen episodes.

The survivors of a clan of 10th-century Scottish gargoyles are brought back to life in modern-day New York City, having been frozen in stone sleep for a thousand years. With the help of police detective Elisa Maza they keep their existence a secret, while learning about the changes that have taken place in the world—and begin to figure out where they belong in it.

No. overall	No. in season	Title	Directed by	Written by	Original release date	Prod. code
1	1	"Awakening, Part 1"	Saburo Hashimoto & Kazuo Terada	Story by : Eric Luke & Michael Reaves; Teleplay by : Michael Reaves	October 24, 1994	001
In the year 994, a medieval castle in Scotland is attacked by Vikings, but they are repelled by guards with help of gargoyles - a race of winged creatures that come to life at night, but sleep during the day as stone statues. While the captain of the guards sees them as heroes and defenders of the castle, the princess, the Magus and others feel revulsion towards them. Goliath and his mentor go after the Vikings before they regroup, but find out it was a diversion and are caught by daybreak outside the castle. The castle is then attacked by Vikings and is betrayed by the captain of the guards, who lets them inside. When Goliath returns the next night, he finds all gargoyles on the walls are smashed and the castle is razed.
2	2	"Awakening, Part 2"	Takamitsu Kawamura & Kazuo Terada	Story by : Eric Luke & Michael Reaves; Teleplay by : Michael Reaves	October 25, 1994	002
Goliath and his mentor return to the castle and find their clan has been smashed during the day. Finding three of their younger comrades, they plan vengeance on Hakon, his vikings and the castle's captain of the guard who had betrayed them. Believing the princess was killed in the attack, the Magus curses the Gargoyles into their stone sleep until the castle rises above the clouds. Goliath reunites Princess Catherine and the Magus and, unwilling to live without his family, asks him to cast his spell on him.
3	3	"Awakening, Part 3"	Saburo Hashimoto & Kazuo Terada	Story by : Eric Luke & Michael Reaves; Teleplay by : Michael Reaves	October 26, 1994	003
Having been awakened in Manhattan in the year 1994 by industrialist David Xanatos, a furious battle breaks out causing detective Elisa Maza to investigate, discovering then befriending Goliath. Xanatos informs Goliath that three important computer disks had been stolen during the raid and implores their help to retrieve them.
4	4	"Awakening, Part 4"	Saburo Hashimoto & Kazuo Terada	Story by : Eric Luke & Michael Reaves; Teleplay by : Michael Reaves	October 27, 1994	004
Goliath and Elisa name the former leader Hudson after the Hudson River before going to explore the city. In Central Park, Goliath and Elisa are ambushed by the men who had attacked the castle. Goliath turns to stone and Elisa saves his life by drawing the guards away from him. It is revealed that Goliath's mate had survived the attack on the castle as well, and also agrees to retrieve the data disks.
5	5	"Awakening, Part 5"	Takamitsu Kawamura & Kazuo Terada	Story by : Eric Luke & Michael Reaves; Teleplay by : Michael Reaves	October 28, 1994	005
The clan goes to retrieve the data disks, Hudson goes to an underground bunker with Bronx. Brooklyn, Broadway and Lexington attack a Cyberbiotics tower on land while Goliath and his mate take their airship, which his mate mercilessly sets to crash before they escape. After Elisa discovers and tells Goliath about Xanatos' deception, he reveals robotic Gargoyles to kill the group. Goliath's mate also reveals her allegiances both with the captain at Wyvern and with Xanatos as well as her name, Demona. When both she and Elisa are put in danger, Goliath must make a choice of whom to save.
6	6	"The Thrill of the Hunt"	Saburo Hashimoto & Kazuo Terada	Michael Reaves	November 4, 1994	006
"The Pack" is a popular television show that the Gargoyles enjoy, not knowing the difference between television and reality. Lexington befriends them and offers to introduce them to Goliath who is untrusting of the situation. Little does Lexington know that the Pack has learned about them and has a deadly hunt planned against the two of them.
7	7	"Temptation"	Saburo Hashimoto & Kazuo Terada	Brynne Chandler Reaves	November 11, 1994	007
Brooklyn takes a motorcycle Lex built out on the town and meets a biker gang who attack him upon realizing he's not human. He is saved by Demona, who explains her belief that humans and gargoyles will never co-exist, convincing Brooklyn to deliver her the Grimorum Arkanorum to show Goliath the truth of her plight. Little does he realize her plans include removing Goliath's will and putting them both in danger.
8	8	"Deadly Force"	Saburo Hashimoto & Kazuo Terada	Michael Reaves	November 18, 1994	008
Mobster Anthony Dracon steals a shipment of high-powered laser weapons from Xanatos to distribute them on the streets. Broadway, having seen a western movie, accidentally shoots Elisa with her own gun, sending him on a trip to hunt down all arms dealers to alleviate his own guilt, while the Mazas and Goliath suspect Dracon of shooting her and putting her in a fight of life and death.
9	9	"Enter MacBeth"	Saburo Hashimoto & Kazuo Terada	Steve Perry	January 6, 1995	009
With Xanatos' release coming up, Elisa tries and fails to convince Goliath to move out of the castle. Meanwhile, a man named MacBeth who knows all about gargoyles offers to clear them from Xanatos' home. His real goal is Demona, and to prove his point, he captures Lex, Brooklyn and Bronx, forcing Goliath into a confrontation with him.
10	10	"The Edge"	Saburo Hashimoto & Kazuo Terada	Michael Reaves	January 13, 1995	010
Elisa is assigned a partner, conspiracy theorist Matt Bluestone. Their first case involves the theft of an artifact donated by Xanatos, "The Eye of Odin", which is stolen by a Gargoyle-like figure. Realizing the Steel Clan has returned, the gargoyles rush in for a confrontation with them as Xanatos has something he needs to prove to himself.
11	11	"Long Way to Morning"	Takamitsu Kawamura & Kazuo Terada	Brynne Chandler Reaves	January 20, 1995	011
Hudson has to keep Goliath alive as Demona hunts them down, remembering old times in a similar survival situation, Hudson has to make sure Demona doesn't catch them until the sun rises and Goliath is back to his full strength.
12	12	"Her Brother's Keeper"	Takamitsu Kawamura & Kazuo Terada	Michael Reaves	January 27, 1995	012
Jackal and Hyena return to steal a diamond Xanatos intends to buy. Elisa's brother Derek Maza saves Xanatos' life and Xanatos offers him a job as a pilot and bodyguard, which Elisa abhors. Derek takes the job as Elisa sets out to prove Xanatos' ploy, while Jackal and Hyena target Xanatos again, forcing the Gargoyles to take action. Elisa decides to leave it up to Derek to choose whether or not to listen to her evidence.
13	13	"Reawakening"	Saburo Hashimoto & Kazuo Terada	Brynne Chandler Reaves	February 3, 1995	013
Demona and Xanatos combine science and sorcery together to resurrect Goliath's rookery brother Coldstone, who blames Goliath for the deaths of the entire clan and goes on a city-wide rampage.

=== Season 2 (1995–96) ===
The second season premiered on September 4, 1995, and consisted of 52 episodes. The Gargoyles have now sworn to protect their adopted city of New York, while still keeping themselves secret from the public.

Beginning with the three-part episode "Avalon" and continuing for much of the rest of the season, episodes focus on a small group of characters—Goliath, his daughter Angela, Elisa, and Bronx—who are sent on a series of quests by the magical island of Avalon. The season concludes with a series of interrelated stories that begins with the two-part episode "The Gathering".

No. overall	No. in season	Title	Directed by	Written by	Original release date	Prod. code
14	1	"Leader of the Pack"	Frank Paur	Steve Perry	September 4, 1995	014
Dingo, assisted by new Pack member Coyote, who wears a cybernetic suit of armor, break Jackal, Hyena and Wolf out of jail. Fox remains behind as the others escape to exact revenge on the Gargoyles, though Coyote and Wolf vie for the leadership of the Pack, and are shocked to learn who lies behind the mask.
15	2	"Metamorphosis"	Frank Paur	Lydia Marano & Brynne Chandler Reaves	September 5, 1995	016
Geneticist Doctor Sevarius was hired by Xanatos to create replicas of the Gargoyles, but the mutations he's created are a cross between jungle cats, bats and electric eels. Derek shields Xanatos from an attack and is infected by the Mutate serum, but the Gargoyles raid the facility before Sevarius is complete and he is killed indirectly as a result. However, it is later revealed to have been a ruse to hide Sevarious. Sevarious continues to work for Xanatos in secret.
16	3	"Legion"	Frank Paur	Marty Isenberg & Robert N. Skir	September 6, 1995	015
Coldstone is reactivated, and a program installed by Xanatos causes him to raid a research building and attempt to steal classified information from a computer. But he is infected by a formidable virus which begins to affect his behavior as Goliath tries to get him to join his clan. His mind had been merged with the personalities of two other Gargoyles, and one of them holds a grudge seemingly bigger and more malicious than Demona's.
17	4	"A Lighthouse in the Sea of Time"	Frank Paur	Lydia Marano & Brynne Chandler Reaves	September 7, 1995	017
MacBeth steals a set of scrolls, supposedly written by Merlin himself. Meanwhile, Hudson befriends a blind writer named Jeffrey Robbins, who teaches the value of reading to the illiterate old warrior. When the gargoyles confront MacBeth for the scrolls, Goliath threatens to burn them; however, Broadway and Hudson convince him and MacBeth though there are no spells in the scrolls (and are instead Merlin's diary), they contain a magic all their own - "when you read them, they take you there." Later, Jeffrey finds himself inspired by the news of the scrolls, beginning a new book; the episode ends with Hudson listening in on the beginning of the book, which contains wisdom about books themselves.
18	5	"The Mirror"	Frank Paur	Lydia Marano	September 11, 1995	021
A magical mirror is stolen by Demona, who frees the mischievous Puck from it; purposely re-interpreting Demona's wishes, he makes the Gargoyles human and the humans gargoyles. In the chaos, Goliath and the others are able to detain him and send Demona fleeing, but as a gift for the fun he'd had, Puck grants Demona the ability to become human during the day instead of her vulnerable stone sleep. Note: Due to Puck's mischief, Goliath and Elisa see what the other would be like as a human and gargoyle respectively. It's at this moment that the two started having feelings for each other.
19	6	"The Silver Falcon"	Frank Paur	Cary Bates	September 12, 1995	018
Matt disappears following a lead to the Illuminati. Elisa and Broadway, in traditional noir fashion, investigate his case in order to find him in the clutches of Dracon and his grandfather Dominick, a suspected member of the Illuminati. It turns out, Dominick had been double-crossed by his old partner in crime, Mace Malone, who had disappeared with uncut jewels they stole back in the 20s; unfortunately, Mace left behind a wild goose chase.
20	7	"Eye of the Beholder"	Frank Paur	Steve Perry	September 13, 1995	019
On Halloween, the Gargoyles go out into public while Xanatos proposes to Fox, giving her the Eye of Odin as a wedding gift. The gift's magical properties come to light during the full moon, and she becomes a werewolf that threatens both Xanatos and the general population. Goliath is forced to help Xanatos and realize that even he is capable of true love.
21	8	"Vows"	Frank Paur	Shari Goodhartz	September 14, 1995	020
During Xanatos and Fox's wedding, Goliath, who was asked to be the best man, is attacked by Demona wielding another magical artifact; the Phoenix Gate, which she uses to send herself, Goliath, Xanatos, Fox and Xanatos' father back in time to Castle Wyvern, where Demona hopes to convince her younger self to betray her mate Goliath and change the future.
22	9	"City of Stone, Part 1"	Frank Paur	Story by : Michael Reaves; Teleplay by : Brynne Chandler Reaves & Lydia Marano	September 18, 1995	022
Demona plots with Xanatos to steal one minute of life from everyone in the city, says this is how she's lived for over 1000 years, but is a lie. The Weird Sisters appear and watch as the spell Demona casts instead turns the humans to stone during the night, allowing Demona to easily dispatch them as she remembers her history, growing old in fear of humans until offered safe haven in a new castle.
23	10	"City of Stone, Part 2"	Frank Paur	Story by : Michael Reaves; Teleplay by : Brynne Chandler Reaves & Lydia Marano	September 19, 1995	023
Xanatos and the Gargoyles research a way to break the spell while Demona remembers more of her past, a misunderstanding leading to her betrayal of a king and the creation of the Hunters.
24	11	"City of Stone, Part 3"	Frank Paur	Story by : Michael Reaves; Teleplay by : Lydia Marano & Brynne Chandler Reaves	September 20, 1995	024
Aged considerably in the past, Demona meets MacBeth and the two make a pact, conjured by a trio of witches to bind their lives together, giving MacBeth's youth to Demona, while also preventing the two from aging any farther. The only way to break the spell is for one of them to kill the other; which would be hard as they feel each other's pain when close to one another. Meanwhile, in the present, Goliath is approached by the Weird Sisters offering their help, as a new Hunter tries to kill Demona.
25	12	"City of Stone, Part 4"	Frank Paur	Story by : Michael Reaves; Teleplay by : Lydia Marano & Brynne Chandler Reaves	September 21, 1995	025
The new Hunter is revealed to be MacBeth, whose story comes to life after a centuries-long betrayal by Demona sets them in a battle that endangers everyone. Meanwhile, the Gargoyles and Xanatos formulate a way to break the spell.
26	13	"High Noon"	Dennis J. Woodyard	Lydia Marano	September 25, 1995	026
MacBeth and Demona work together to free Coldstone's evil personality to help them to destroy the Gargoyles, while the secret of Demona's human form during the day is revealed to Elisa as she confronts the two alone during the day. At the end of the story, it is revealed Coldstone was a ruse to steal the Phoenix Gate, the Eye of Odin and the Grimmorum. Right as Demona and MacBeth begin questioning why they're working together, they are taken away by the Weird Sisters along with the items.
27	14	"Outfoxed"	Dennis J. Woodyard	Cary Bates	September 28, 1995	027
Concerned that Xanatos will sabotage a state-of-the-art flying fortress, Goliath vows to protect it, but is captured by the ship's owner, Cyberbiotics' CEO Halcyon Renard, and his assistant Preston Vogel. His morality questioned by Renard, Goliath is forced to admit something about their previous attack on the airship, despite being misled by Xanatos. Also, Fox has some surprising news.
28	15	"The Price"	Dennis J. Woodyard	Story by : Lee Nordling & Michael Reaves; Teleplay by : Michael Reaves	October 12, 1995	032
Hudson does not wake from his stone sleep after an attack by MacBeth, who was seemingly destroyed in the fray. Little does Goliath realize that this is just a ruse by Xanatos, who seeks a test subject to a cauldron that is said to make whoever bathes in it live "As long as the mountain stones". Meanwhile, Hudson proves himself even in his advanced age, a worthy adversary to thwart Xanatos' plans.
29	16	"Revelations"	Frank Paur	Cary Bates	October 26, 1995	033
Matt Bluestone finally gets a lead on the Illuminati that pays off. He finds Mace Malone, Dominic Dracon's old partner in crime. Mace reveals that the Illuminati has been impressed with Matt's determination to reveal them and has decided to offer him membership. To prove his claim, Mace reveals that Elisa knows about the gargoyles (thanks to Xanatos, another member); if the information is correct, Matt is to lure a gargoyle to the Hotel Cabal. Elisa introduces Matt to the Manhattan Clan. Matt asks Goliath to help him infiltrate the hotel, believing it may contain proof of the Illuminati's existence. They both fall into traps, with Matt ending up with Mace and Goliath in a series of death traps. Goliath uses a key for the hotel Mace gave Matt to bypass the traps, forcing Mace to personally attack. Matt intervenes, making Mace lose his key and allowing them to escape; without it, Mace is trapped. Matt is surprised by his old friend from the FBI, Hacker, who reveals himself to be a member of the Illuminati; Hacker gives him an Illuminati pin, stating he fulfilled his role and earned his place in the organization.
30	17	"Double Jeopardy"	Frank Paur	Cary Bates	November 6, 1995	030
Mysterious sightings of a gargoyle who looks and sounds like Goliath leads him and Elisa to his clone Thailog, who had been using his three "fathers", Goliath, Xanatos, and Anton Sevarius, and captures them for their wealth with which to plot human domination. Despite what seems to have been Thailog's death, Xanatos realizes that since he gave Thailog his ambitions and cunning, there's always the possibility Thailog had a backup plan to escape. Feeling genuine horror, Xanatos realizes, "I've created a monster"; a creature with the strength of a gargoyle and a mind as warped as his own.
31	18	"Upgrade"	Frank Paur	Adam Gilad	November 9, 1995	028
The Pack receive genetic and technological upgrades to their bodies from Coyote and prove to be more than a match for Goliath, Elisa, Bronx and Hudson, who are captured. Meanwhile, vying for place as second in command, Brooklyn, Lex and Broadway must come up with a plan to free their friends and defeat the Pack.
32	19	"Protection"	Butch Lukic	Gary Sperling	November 13, 1995	031
Elisa is acting strangely, so Goliath and Broadway go to investigate. They discover that gangster Tony Dracon is running a protection racket, and Elisa seems to have joined him. They pretend to join, learning Elisa is undercover to get Dracon arrested. Broadway and Goliath each thwart Dracon's attempts to extort money, helping gather evidence on his crimes and get him arrested. As a side joke, Broadway enjoys jalapeños throughout the episode, starting the theme of Gargoyles saying "Jalapeña" as an exclamation. Goliath later exclaims "Jalapeña" after trying one in the final scene as the end credits begin to roll.
33	20	"The Cage"	Dennis J. Woodyard	Lydia Marano	November 16, 1995	029
Unable to see Elisa suffer with keeping her brother's condition a secret, Goliath goes to extreme lengths to help Talon and the other Mutates, even kidnapping Sevarius to force him to make a cure. But with the Mutates blaming Goliath for their condition, things get tense.
34	21	"Avalon, Part 1"	Dennis J. Woodyard	Lydia Marano	November 20, 1995	034
Tom, a young boy from Castle Wyvern, appears in New York now fully grown and asks Goliath for his help in defeating the Archmage, MacBeth, Demona, and the Weird Sisters on the mystical island of Avalon.
35	22	"Avalon, Part 2"	Dennis J. Woodyard	Lydia Marano	November 21, 1995	035
After learning of the threat of the Archmage, Goliath, Elisa, and Bronx accompany Tom to Avalon and learn what became of their human allies once Goliath joined his clan in stone sleep over 1000 years ago. A series of flashbacks following Hudson's final mission as clan leader against the Archmage reveals how the Archmage survived and what roles MacBeth and Demona have yet to play into his current attack against Avalon.
36	23	"Avalon, Part 3"	Dennis J. Woodyard	Lydia Marano	November 22, 1995	036
Discovering that his clan's rookery eggs had survived and their children are thriving on Avalon, Goliath enlists the children's help in finding a way to defeat the Archmage, and with their help, resurrects a sleeping King Arthur who resides on Avalon.
37	24	"Shadows of the Past"	Kazuo Terada	Story by : Michael Reaves; Teleplay by : Brynne Chandler Reaves & Michael Reaves	November 23, 1995	037
The magic of Avalon—as the first episode of the "Avalon World Tour" story arc in Gargoyles—sends the travelers: Goliath, Angela, Bronx and Elisa to where they "need to be", and they land on the shores of the ruins of Castle Wyvern. Goliath becomes possessed by horrific hauntings, and deep underground, the group perilously discovers two souls that had died centuries before that still haunt the place, and have a bone to pick with the gargoyles.
38	25	"Heritage"	Frank Paur	Adam Gilad	November 27, 1995	042
Arriving in Canada, Elisa is separated from the others and is found by a tribeswoman named Grandmother and Natsilane who is attempting to separate himself from their mythology and a destined battle with the malevolent Raven. As Elisa is being nursed to health, the others meet Raven in the guise of a Gargoyle who claims Grandmother is evil, forcing a confrontation.
39	26	"Monsters"	Frank Paur	Cary Bates	November 28, 1995	039
Returning to Scotland, this time at Loch Ness, the world tourists encounter Dr. Sevarius and the Loch Ness Monster. Angela discovers her true parentage from Sevarius as she tries to save Nessie from his experiments and bonds with the youngling.
40	27	"Golem"	Frank Paur	Gary Sperling	December 14, 1995	038
Arriving in Prague, Goliath, Elisa, and Bronx come across Halcyon Renard, who wants to make himself immortal by transferring his soul into the mythical Golem. With his integrity called into question, Renard must decide whether throwing it away is too high a price to pay for his life.
41	28	"Sanctuary"	Dennis J. Woodyard	Cary Bates	December 18, 1995	041
Arriving in Paris, Goliath and Elisa must put a stop to Demona, currently in her human guise of Dominique Destine, courting MacBeth for marriage. Little do they realize she and Thailog have other plans in mind for him.
42	29	"M.I.A."	Kazuro Terada	Robert Cohen	December 21, 1995	047
In London, the World Tourists encounter the London Clan's gargoyle leaders, who blame Goliath for their comrade's disappearance decades ago, during the Battle of Britain. With the help of the Phoenix Gate, Goliath travels back to discover what really happened to Griff.
43	30	"Grief"	Takamitsu Kawamura & Kazuro Terada	Story by : Michael Reaves; Teleplay by : Brynne Chandler Reaves & Michael Reaves	December 28, 1995	040
The World Tourists arrive in Egypt, where they encounter a bereaved Emir under the employ of Xanatos seeking to control the death god and child of Oberon, Anubis. Jackal and Hyena oversee the operation and cause trouble for the Gargoyles and Elisa when they try to interfere.
44	31	"Kingdom"	Bob Kline	Marty Isenberg & Robert N. Skir	February 5, 1996	044
While Brooklyn struggles to assert his authority in the wake of Goliath's mysterious disappearance, Fang conspires to rule over his fellow Mutates in the Labyrinth.
45	32	"The Hound of Ulster"	Bob Kline	Story by : Michael Reaves; Teleplay by : Diane Duane & Peter Morwood	February 6, 1996	048
The World Tourists arrive in Ireland. Unbeknownst to them, another of Oberon's children, the Banshee, is in the midst of distracting a young human named Rory from a powerful secret, but Bronx's arrival brings it to light. Rory battles the Banshee and aids in the rescue of Goliath, Elisa and Angela.
46	33	"Walkabout"	Dennis J. Woodyard	Story by : Michael Reaves; Teleplay by : Steve Perry	February 7, 1996	043
Arriving in Australia, the Tourists must ally with Dingo, Fox and her mother, Anastasia Renard, to stop out-of-control nanobots. Their journey leads Dingo and Goliath on a vision quest in order to confront it.
47	34	"Mark of the Panther"	Dennis J. Woodyard	Lydia Marano	February 8, 1996	045
The World Tourists arrive in Nigeria, where Elisa's mother Diane and a group of storytellers are attacked by poachers. A friend of hers, a man who sought out another of Oberon's children Anansi to become a panther, fends them off and they discover that every story has a price.
48	35	"Pendragon"	Dennis J. Woodyard	Lydia Marano	February 12, 1996	049
Arthur Pendragon and Griff are sent to New York by a magic incantation in a quest to retrieve Excalibur from the Lady of the Lake. They run into Goliath's clan and get their help, but MacBeth eavesdrops and, seeing the description of the true king in himself, seeks to find the sword first.
49	36	"Eye of the Storm"	Bob Kline	Cary Bates	February 13, 1996	050
Goliath and the others arrive in Scandinavia, where Elisa and Angela's lives are put into peril by Odin, who seeks to claim his eye. Goliath dons the talisman in order to prevent it, but becomes more of a danger to his friends than his enemies by its sheer power.
50	37	"The New Olympians"	Bob Kline	Adam Gilad	February 14, 1996	051
The world tourists arrive in a hidden city of mythological creatures and Elisa is imprisoned as a direct result of their hatred and distrust of humans by the captain of the guard Taurus, but an even greater danger arises with the shape-shifting Proteus, who tries to escape imprisonment by impersonating Elisa, Goliath and Taurus.
51	38	"The Green"	Takamitsu Kawamura & Kazuro Terada	Cary Bates	February 15, 1996	054
The world tourists arrive in a rainforest in Guatemala, where a clan of Gargoyles capable of resisting stone sleep due to magical talismans fend their temple off from loggers and hired hands Jackal and Hyena.
52	39	"Sentinel"	Bob Kline	Cary Bates	February 19, 1996	046
The world tourists arrive on Easter Island and encounter an alien sentry named Nokkar, who is stubbornly convinced that the gargoyles are alien enemies of Earth. Elisa has her memory temporarily wiped by Nokkar, but is still loyal to her friends. This convinces Nokkar of his misjudgment. Elisa convinces Nokkar to make new friends to stand by him as he keeps watch on Earth.
53	40	"Bushido"	Dennis J. Woodyard	Gary Sperling	February 20, 1996	055
The world tourists come to a Japanese village where a large gargoyle clan lives harmoniously with the resident humans, except for one who wants to exploit them.
54	41	"Cloud Fathers"	Dennis J. Woodyard	Lydia Marano	February 21, 1996	053
The world tourists arrive in Flagstaff, Arizona, where they meet Elisa's father and younger sister, as well as another child of Oberon, the trickster Coyote.
55	42	"Ill Met by Moonlight"	Dennis J. Woodyard	Story by : Michael Reaves; Teleplay by : Diane Duane & Peter Morwood	February 22, 1996	052
When Goliath and company return to Avalon, the faerie lord Oberon and his queen Titania return as well after a millennium-long exile. Trouble ensues when Oberon decides to evict the Avalon Clan from his island.
56	43	"Future Tense"	Bob Kline	Marty Isenberg & Robert N. Skir	April 25, 1996	056
Finally released from Avalon's spell, Goliath, Elisa, and Bronx arrive back in New York, only to discover that 40 years have passed, and many things have changed for the worse. The dystopian future turns out to be an illusion created by Puck. As a precaution, Goliath activates the Phoenix Gate and releases it without a mind to guard it.
57	44	"The Gathering, Part 1"	Bob Kline	Lydia Marano	April 29, 1996	057
Oberon recalls his children to Avalon, but Puck has other plans. Meanwhile, Fox and Xanatos are expecting their first baby with Owen, Anastasia, Halcion Renard and Preston Vougel all present, when Oberon arrives and puts the entire city to sleep. Goliath, Angela, Bronx and Elisa finally return home from their world tour.
58	45	"The Gathering, Part 2"	Bob Kline	Story by : Lydia Marano; Teleplay by : Lydia Marano & Gary Sperling	April 30, 1996	058
The Gargoyles and Xanatos' resources defend the castle against Oberon's onslaught. It's discovered that Anastasia is Queen Titania, which marks potential for their son Alexander to hold magic, and they agree against Fox or Xanatos' wishes to take him to Avalon for magical training.
59	46	"Vendettas"	Bob Kline	Cary Bates	May 1, 1996	059
While Goliath and Hudson battle Wolf from the Pack, who is armed with a battle axe possessed by the spirit of Hakon, another assailant ineptly pursues the two for his own revenge due to the Gargoyles being indirectly responsible for ruining his life from various past events.
60	47	"Turf"	Dennis J. Woodyard	Marty Isenberg & Robert N. Skir	May 6, 1996	060
The young Gargoyles' attempts to help Elisa interfere with a gang war (Thomas Broad is attempting to take over Tony Dracon's territory) is complicated with the males fighting over the right to court Angela.
61	48	"The Reckoning"	Dennis J. Woodyard	Story by : Lydia Marano; Teleplay by : Gary Sperling	May 7, 1996	061
The Manhattan Clan captures Demona, only to find that they are falling into a trap involving Fang and Thailog's new gargoyle clones. Meanwhile, Demona finally meets face-to-face with her daughter Angela, and attempts to bond with her.
62	49	"Possession"	Dennis J. Woodyard	Cary Bates	May 8, 1996	062
Xanatos attempts to carry out part of his repayment for the clan's assistance, but things go dangerously awry when Puck intervenes with possessing Angela, Broadway and Brooklyn with the three spirits that dwelled within Coldstone.
63	50	"Hunter's Moon, Part 1"	Dennis J. Woodyard	Michael Reaves	May 13, 1996	063
The Clan finds itself attacked by the current generation of Hunters; Jason, Robyn, and Jon Canmore, all of whom have ties to Elisa, Demona and Xanatos without their knowledge.
64	51	"Hunter's Moon, Part 2"	Dennis J. Woodyard	Michael Reaves	May 14, 1996	064
The Clan members reluctantly ally themselves with Demona against the Hunters, only to have their opponents strike hard at them when they are most vulnerable; at home in the clock tower.
65	52	"Hunter's Moon, Part 3"	Dennis J. Woodyard	Michael Reaves	May 15, 1996	065
After destroying their home, the Hunters publicly expose the Clan, demonizing them. In the meantime, Demona creates a virus that will wipe out humanity while a mystical gargoyle protects her kind from it. However, a fight between the Hunters and the Manhattan Clan breaks out before she proceeds with her plan, eventually losing the artifact and forcing her to give up on her plans. Two of the Hunters see the errors of their ways by seeing how much the Manhattan Clan is trying to save them, but the third slips into a delusion to avoid guilt over hurting one of his siblings by accident; he vows to continue vengeance.

=== Season 3: The Goliath Chronicles (1996–97) ===
Disney ended the original show's syndicated run in 1996, but ABC immediately picked it up, renaming it Gargoyles: The Goliath Chronicles. The revamped show, with a largely new staff of writers and animators led by Canadian animator Charles E. Bastien, ran on ABC's Saturday morning schedule for a single season consisting of 13 episodes.

Following the events of "Hunter's Moon", the public is now fully aware of the existence of the Gargoyles; season 3 deals with the public's sometimes prejudicial misunderstanding of the Gargoyles' natures and intentions. Disney outsourced the show's production to Nelvana rather than having it done in-house at Disney Television Animation, "Seeing Isn't Believing" however was animated overseas by Walt Disney Animation Australia in Sydney.

No. overall	No. in season	Title	Written by	Original release date	Prod. code
66	1	"The Journey"	Greg Weisman	September 7, 1996	068
The public are now fully aware of the Manhattan clan's existence. Bluestone tries calming the public, while Xanatos hides the clan. MacBeth goes on television to convince everyone gargoyles are no more dangerous than humans and are just as intelligent. Former Hunter, John Castaway, takes advantage of the people's fear and confusion, creating an anti-Gargoyle group called the Quarrymen. Their goal is to eradicate any and all gargoyles.
67	2	"Ransom"	Adam Gilad	September 14, 1996	070
Alex Xanatos is kidnapped, inciting the wrath of both Xanatos and Lexington; the ransom is a gargoyle. Xanatos refuses to give into the demand, as it will show his enemies that he can be manipulated; instead, he focuses all his resources on finding his son. Lexington tracks the culprit down, but ends up caught in a trap and to be used in mayoral candidate Doyle's speech to the public. After escaping, Lexington saves Alex and returns him home to Fox and Xanatos. The episode ends with Lexingon turning to stone as he rocked Alex; Alex gave Lexington a kiss on the cheek.
68	3	"Runaways"	Lydia Marano	September 21, 1996	069
After a heated argument with Goliath, Brooklyn runs away from the castle and befriends two runaway teenagers. Through a series of events, Brooklyn realizes Goliath was just looking out for him and trying to show him how to be responsible, and the runaways are reunited with their parents.
69	4	"Broadway Goes to Hollywood"	Cary Bates	September 28, 1996	071
Seeing the gargoyles need a way to improve their image to ease the public's concern about them, Fox helps Broadway go to Hollywood for a TV interview. Unfortunately, the Quarrymen have hired a few old faces to ensure they fail: Hyena and Jackal are back! They strap a jetpack and wrist-laser to Broadway, hoping to film the ensuing destruction to turn public opinion further away from accepting gargoyles. However, Fox saves him using a Hunter's armor. Back in Manhattan, Broadway reconciles with Angela for being so egotistical.
70	5	"A Bronx Tail"	Jan Strnad	October 5, 1996	074
While exploring the New York railway tracks, Bronx and Lexington are separated after the latter falls into a river at dawn. Ending up in Pennsylvania, Bronx befriends a runaway Amish boy and defends him from a pack of wolves. Out of gratitude, the Amish boy shelters him inside a barn, providing him with sausages. Two Gargoyle-hating men discover Bronx's presence, prompting him to flee with the Amish boy at night. Meanwhile, Xanatos helps Goliath and Elisa to search for Bronx. Following a highway pursuit, Bronx ends up in a frozen lake. The Amish boy helps Goliath to rescue Bronx, reuniting him with the Manhattan clan. The grateful Amish boy gives a favorable account of his encounter with the Gargoyles to the news media.
71	6	"The Dying of the Light"	Julia Jane Lewald	October 26, 1996	076
Hudson has been having a recurring nightmare about when the Archmage blinded his left eye, coming to the conclusion his other eye is going blind; Hudson is suffering from glaucoma. Visiting his blind friend Jeffery Robbins, Hudson learns Jeffery figured out he was a gargoyle because of his nightly visits and refusal to shake hands. Per Jeffrey's encouragement, Hudson is introduced to his friend's optometrist, who reveals Hudson's sight can be saved with some surgery and medication. The surgery is successful, but the Quarrymen learn of Hudson's location and attack the hospital. Though advised to flee as he cannot use his eye yet, Hudson protests as it is a gargoyle's duty to protect others. With Jeffery's help, Hudson manages to set traps for the Quarrymen, which leave them defeated.
72	7	"And Justice for All"	Mark Edward Edens	November 2, 1996	075
After foiling a robbery, Goliath is unfairly accused of being one of the perpetrators and arrested. Though the rest of the Manhattan clan wish to break him out of jail, Goliath explains abiding by human laws will help make humans fear him less. Due to Goliath's nocturnal nature, the trial is held at night; Goliath points out several faults with the evidence that supposedly designates him as the guilty party. He later tricks the true culprit of the robbery into revealing his guilt, earning his pardon and showing humans that he is willing to abide by their laws and not resort to violence.
73	8	"Genesis Undone"	Cary Bates	November 9, 1996	078
Thailog and his Gargoyle clones are dying by slow petrification, due to some kind of fault in their DNA. A sympathetic Manhattan Clan seeks out Dr. Sevarius to help them. Though Sevarius takes DNA samples from the clan to help heal the clones, he ends up using it to bring a new gargoyle to life, which he names Lil' Anton. Thailog, having originally made a deal with Servarius to leave the scientist in peace in exchange for a cure, gives the false serum to Goliath who uses it on Lil' Anton, petrifying him. Unfortunately, all of the clone clan petrify, with Servarius fleeing while the Manhattan Clan can only hope to restore the clones one day.
74	9	"Generations"	Brooks Wachtel	November 16, 1996	073
After falling out with Goliath, Angela takes refuge with her estranged mother, Demona. Demona shows Angela her life, such as several secret hideouts with nurmerous hi-tech gadgets and weapons, in an attempt to try winning her daughter over to her side.
75	10	"For It May Come True"	Len Uhley	November 23, 1996	080
Goliath awakens in an alternative universe where he is human, married to Elisa with children, and works for Xanatos. Things are actually much worse for the Manhattan Clan; they never met Elisa or Matt, thus leaving them distrustful of humans. Xanatos is also still a villain, as all his scheming against the Manhattan Clan led to him meeting Fox and ending the feud. Goliath is then revealed to have been living in a dream world created by Titania. She reveals that though he may doubt himself sometimes, Goliath is doing a great good at the cost of personal desires.
76	11	"To Serve Mankind"	Len Wein	November 30, 1996	072
The Illuminati capture the Manhattan Clan. Knowing of Goliath's great strength, they decide to use him as a scapegoat to kill a politician whose agenda threatens to destabilize the lower portion of their organization. Placing a chip on Goliath's head, the Illuminati trick him into thinking the clan was wiped out and the target is to blame. However, the rest of the Manhattan Clan escape, revealing the ruse. Goliath overcomes and destroys the chip. The grateful politician sees gargoyles are not so different from people.
77	12	"Seeing Isn't Believing"	Steve Cuden	February 8, 1997	079
Proteus, the villain from New Olympus, escapes from captivity and heads for New York to cause trouble for the clan and Elisa. Taking Goliath's form, he commits many crimes. When confronted by (his New Olympian jailer) Taurus, Elisa and Goliath, Proteus takes on Elisa's form to cause confusion. However, Goliath easily tricks Proteus into revealing himself by asking if Elisa ever doubted his innocence; Proteus answered "no", which is the opposite of what Elisa would say. Captured, Proteus is taken back to New Olympus by Taurus. Elisa tells Goliath that it was rather cruel of him to ask that question.
78	13	"Angels in the Night"	Cary Bates	February 15, 1997	081
The clan is lured into a trap by John Castaway and the Quarrymen, where it is believed all but Angela and Bronx were killed in an explosion. Luckily, it is revealed Xanatos saved the Manhattan Clan by predicting John's plan and bribing the builder of the trap to build a secondary one within to save them, though they remain hidden. Captured, Angela and Bronx are sent on a train to be put in proper captivity. However, the Quarrymen attack the train, speeding it up and planning to send it and the passengers on board over a now-destroyed bridge. The public now sees the Quarrymen are insane, and are even more shocked when the Manhattan Clan save the train and capture the Quarrymen. The episode comes to an end with Goliath repeating the Season 2 narration, but ends with how his clan is now accepted by the world.
