= Loanne Bishop =

American actress

- Born: November 10, 1955 (age 69); Denver, Colorado, U.S.
- Occupation: Actress
- Years active: 1979–present

Loanne Bishop (born November 10, 1955) is an American actress, of film and television.

Bishop was raised in Denver, Colorado. Her father was a Mennonite minister and her mother was a teacher. She first attended Denver University, where she was a theatre major, then transferred to the University of Colorado, where she was a German major.

== Career ==
Loanne Bishop moved to Los Angeles in 1978; she worked as a singing waitress for several months. She was the lead in the independently-produced film The Wisdom Barrier.

Bishop appeared on Kate Loves a Mystery and Barnaby Jones. Bishop played the character of Rose Kelly in the TV daytime soap opera General Hospital from 1980 until 1984. In 1984, she was nominated for the Daytime Emmy Award as Outstanding Supporting Actress in a Drama Series. During her time on General Hospital, she made appearances at various events. Bishop, a mezzo soprano who can pay the violin, performed on the album Love in the Afternoon with other soap opera stars. She did not want to sign a long-term contract for the show.

In 1985, Bishop was in Hostage Flight, she played a flight attendant.

She appeared on Hill Street Blues in 1987.

== Personal life ==
She dated Peter Bergman in the 1980s.

== Filmography ==
- Rizzoli & Isles as Mona Evans (1 episode 2015)
- The Call (2013)(TV movie) as Lorraine Parker
- Mad Men (TV series) as Barb (1 episode, 2013)
- 101 Ways to Get Rejected (TV series) as McKenzie's Mom (1 episode, 2013)
- Don Jon (2013) as Barbara's Mom
- Days of Our Lives (TV series) as Mrs. Carlisle (1 episode, 2012)
- The Closer (TV series) as Mrs. Gates (1 episode, 2011)
- Body of Proof (TV series) as Liz Green (2 episodes, 2011)
- Better with You (TV series) as Elaine Dickinson (3 episodes, 2011)
- Big Love (TV series) as Nurse (1 episode, 2011)
- Glee (TV series) as Waitress (1 episode, 2010)
- Without a Trace (TV series) as Mrs. Feretti (1 episode, 2009)
- Close to Home (TV series) as Melinda Joffe (1 episode, 2006)
- Justice (TV series) as Mrs. Diggs (1 episode, 2006)
- Monk (TV series) as Alumni Chairwoman (1 episode, 2006)
- In Justice (TV series) as Rita Stillwell (1 episode, 2006)
- Cold Case (TV series) as Mrs. Atwater (1 episode, 2004)
- Spectres (2004) as Suzanne
- Malcolm in the Middle (TV series) as Woman (1 episode, 2003)
- Threat Matrix (TV series) as Doctor (1 episode, 2003)
- The District (TV series) as Commander Sarah Ochoa (2 episodes, 2003)
- The Practice (TV series) as Christina Wayne (1 episode, 2003)
- Dragnet (TV series) as Brenda Hollister (1 episode, 2003)
- MDs (TV series) as Soccer Mom (1 episode, 2002)
- Alabama Dreams (TV series) as Tilly Sims (1 episode, 2001)
- Buffy the Vampire Slayer (TV series) as 911 Operator (voice) (1 episode, 2001)
- Family Law (TV series) as Female Wildlife Warden (1 episode, 2000)
- 7th Heaven (TV series) as Sharon (1 episode, 2000)
- Kiss the Girls (1997) as Kate's Nurse
- Three Wishes (1995) as Bystander
- Step by Step (TV series) as Becky Ann Covington (1 episode, 1995)
- The Middle Passage (1994)
- Kalifornia (1993) as Female Officer
- The Wonder Years (TV series) as Class President (1 episode, 1993)
- Baby of the Bride (1991)(TV movie) as Nurse (uncredited)
- False Arrest (1991) (TV movie) as Nurse #2
- Hooperman (TV series) as Frankie Childs (1 episode, 1989)
- Santa Barbara (TV series) as Rita Grant (18 episodes, 1987–1988)
- Hill Street Blues (TV series) as Billie Jo (1 episode, 1987)
- Hill Street Blues (TV series) as Mrs. Metcalf (1 episode, 1987)
- Hostage Flight (1985) (TV movie) as Colette
- General Hospital (TV series) as Rose Kelly (unknown episodes, 1980–1984)
- Barnaby Jones (TV series) as Laurie (1 episode, 1980)
- Mrs. Columbo (TV series) as Young Woman (1 episode, 1979)
