= Paul Cristo =

American composer and conductor

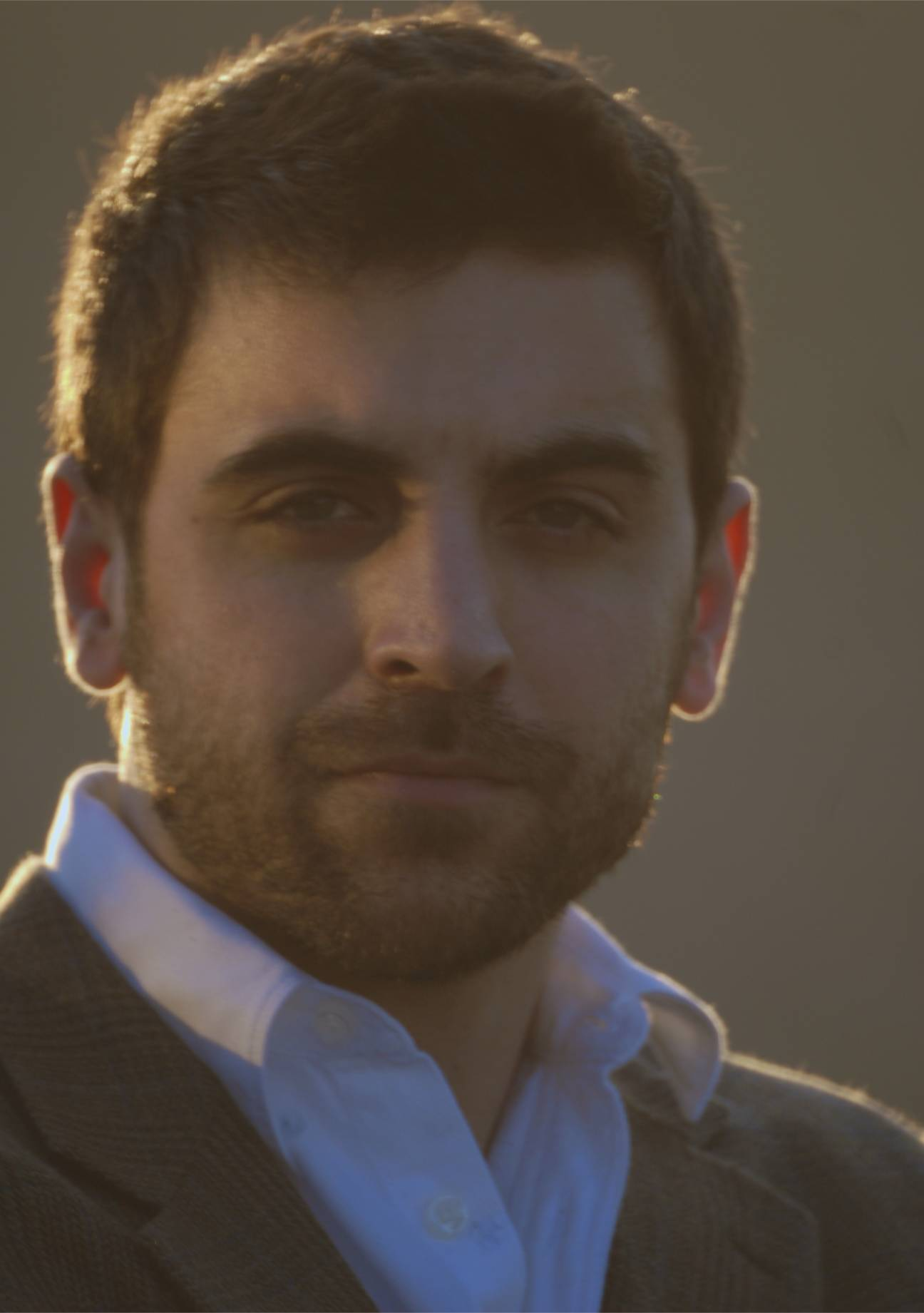
- Cristo prior to premiere of ‘Festa’
- Born: Paul Hardesty Cristo; January 2, 1980 (age 46); Tulsa, Oklahoma
- Occupations: composer, conductor
- Website: http://www.paulcristo.com

Paul Hardesty Cristo (born January 2, 1980) is an American composer and conductor. His focus is specific to film scoring, but has composed other works as well.

== Early life ==
Cristo was born in Tulsa, Oklahoma. In 1992, Cristo moved to Phoenix, Arizona, with his family. He attended Arcadia High School and graduated in 1998. He later attended Berklee College of Music in Boston and in 2001, received a bachelor's degree in musical composition, graduating magna cum laude.

After graduation, Cristo moved to Los Angeles to pursue his film scoring career.

== Film scoring ==
Cristo’s compositions lean mainly toward the large-scale orchestral sound of the late 19th century- notable for counterpoint, texture, chromaticism, harmonies and orchestration, employing an elaborate use of leitmotifs. His music reflects an influence from Wagner, and the more contemporary John Williams.

Prior to completing his studies at Berklee, Cristo’s first commercial film composition was for the award-winning horror art film, Little Erin Merryweather (released in 2003). Cristo conducted a professional orchestra as well as the University Chorale of Boston College at one of the cathedrals on the Boston College campus. The use of the Chorale in the style of a Wagnerian-chant, enhanced the dark nature of the film.

Once Cristo arrived in Los Angeles, he worked as an orchestrator as well as providing technical computer support to augment his income. His next score was for the short film, Last Confession (2005).

Cristo’s scoring accomplishments continued with a dramatic western River's End (2005), a mystery thriller The Deep Below (2007), and the action drama The Governor (2007).

In 2007, Cristo scored his first major studio release. He co-wrote the score for the 4th installment of MGM’s “Species” franchise, Species - The Awakening with British Rock drummer Kevin Haskins.

In 2008, Cristo wrote the score for the award-winning The Appearance of a Man (2008).

== Concert works ==
In 2008, Cristo was commissioned to write an original composition for the Tulsa Ballet. Cristo teamed with award-winning resident choreographer Ma Cong, to compose a ballet consisting of six movements, Festa, as part of the ballet program, Mediterranea. The ballet premiered on May 1, 2009.

== Notable compositions ==
Film scores:

· Little Erin Merryweather (2003)
· Last Confession (2005)
· River's End (2007)
· The Deep Below (2007)
· The Governor (2007)
· Species - The Awakening (2007)
· The Appearance of a Man (2008)
· Singularity (2010)

Concert works:

· Festa (2009)
