= Gargoyles (TV series) =

1994–1997 American animated television series

- Also known as: Gargoyles: The Goliath Chronicles (season 3)
- Genre: Action-adventure; Urban fantasy; Science fantasy; Superhero
- Written by: (5 or more episodes); Michael Reaves; Lydia Marano; Brynne Chandler Reaves; Cary Bates; Gary Sperling; Eric Luke
- Directed by: (5 or more episodes); Dennis Woodyard; Frank Paur; Kazuo Terada (head director; season 1); Saburo Hashimoto; Bob Kline; Charles E. Bastien (season 3); Jamie Thomason
- Voices of: Keith David; Salli Richardson; Jeff Bennett; Bill Fagerbakke; Thom Adcox-Hernandez; Ed Asner; Frank Welker; Brigitte Bako; Marina Sirtis; Jonathan Frakes
- Composer: Carl Johnson
- Countries of origin: United States; Canada (season 3); Japan (seasons 1–2)
- Original language: English
- No. of seasons: 3
- No. of episodes: 78 (list of episodes)

Production
- Producers: Frank Paur; Greg Weisman; Dennis Woodyard; Vince Commisso (season 3)
- Editor: Susan Edmunson
- Running time: 22 minutes
- Production companies: Walt Disney Television Animation (Note: Animation outsourced to AKOM, Animal-Ya, Hanho Heung-Up, Jade Animation, Koko Enterprises, Saerom Animation, Sunmin Image Pictures, Sunwoo Animation, Hong Ying Animation, Tama Productions, Toon City, Walt Disney Animation Australia and Wang Film Productions.); Walt Disney Animation Japan (seasons 1–2); Nelvana Limited (Note: The animation for Season 3 was originally going to be given by then-fellow Disney subsidiary DIC Productions, L.P., but was eventually given to Nelvana.) (season 3); Buena Vista Television

Original release
- Network: Syndication
- Release: October 24, 1994 – May 15, 1996
- Network: ABC
- Release: September 7, 1996 – February 15, 1997

Gargoyles (also known as Gargoyles: The Goliath Chronicles for season 3) is an animated television series co-produced by Walt Disney Television Animation and Buena Vista Television, Walt Disney Animation Japan for its first two seasons and Nelvana Limited for its final, and originally aired from October 24, 1994, to February 15, 1997. The series features a species of nocturnal creatures known as gargoyles that turn to stone during the day. After spending a thousand years in an enchanted petrified state, the gargoyles (who have been transported from medieval Scotland) are reawakened in modern-day New York City, and take on roles as the city's secret night-time protectors.

Gargoyles was noted for its relatively dark tone, complex story arcs, and melodrama; character arcs were heavily employed throughout the series, as were Shakespearean themes. The series also received favorable comparisons to Batman: The Animated Series, X-Men: The Animated Series and Teenage Mutant Ninja Turtles. A video game adaptation and a spin-off comic series were released in 1995. The show's storyline continued from 2006 to 2009 in a comic book series of the same title, produced by Slave Labor Graphics, and was again revived by Dynamite Entertainment in 2022. In 2026, a potential animated revival was hinted to be in development.

== Premise ==
One thousand years ago, superstition and the sword ruled. It was a time of darkness. It was a world of fear. It was the age of gargoyles. Stone by day, warriors by night, We were betrayed by the humans we had sworn to protect, frozen in stone by a magic spell for a thousand years. Now, here in Manhattan, the spell is broken, and we live again! We are defenders of the night! We are gargoyles!

— Goliath's opening narration

The series features a species of nocturnal creatures known as gargoyles that turn to stone during the day, focusing on a clan led by Goliath. In 994, the clan lives in a castle in Scotland. Most are betrayed and killed by humans while petrified and the remainder are magically cursed to sleep—i.e., be frozen in stone form until the castle "rises above the clouds." A thousand years later in 1994, billionaire David Xanatos purchases the gargoyles' castle and has it reconstructed atop his New York skyscraper, the Eyrie Building, thus awakening Goliath and the remainder of his clan. While trying to adjust to their new world, they are aided by a sympathetic police officer named Elisa Maza and quickly come into conflict with the plotting Xanatos. In addition to dealing with the gargoyles' attempts to adjust to modern New York City, the series also incorporated various supernatural threats to their safety and to the world at large.

== Episodes ==
| Season | Episodes | Originally released | | |
| Season | Episodes | First released | Last released | Network |
|---|---|---|---|---|
| 1 | 13 | October 24, 1994 | February 3, 1995 | Syndication |
| 2 | 52 | September 4, 1995 | May 15, 1996 | Syndication |
| 3 | 13 | September 7, 1996 | February 15, 1997 | ABC |

A total of 78 half-hour episodes were produced.

The first two seasons aired in the Disney Afternoon programming block. The first season consisted of 13 episodes, including a five-part opening story. This season's episodes were almost entirely written by Michael Reaves and Brynne Chandler Reaves. The second season featured 52 episodes, and a long mid-season story arc dubbed by fans as "The Gargoyles World Tour" in which four of the main characters travel the world, encountering other Gargoyles and confronting various mystical and science-fictional dangers. The writing staff was greatly expanded for season two.

Following Disney's purchase of ABC in 1996, the third and final season aired during Saturday mornings on ABC as Gargoyles: The Goliath Chronicles.

== Voice cast ==
Thom Adcox-Hernandez, Ed Asner, Jeff Bennett, Keith David, Bill Fagerbakke, and Salli Richardson voiced the main characters, and appeared in a majority of episodes.

The voice cast featured many alumni of the Star Trek franchise, including Marina Sirtis and Jonathan Frakes, who were featured regularly as principal cast members. Many other Star Trek actors had recurring roles or made guest appearances.

== Development ==
The series bears no creator credit, though there were several people who are responsible for the show's format. Michael Reaves, who wrote the first six episodes and was the primary writer/story editor of the show's first two seasons has described himself with respect to Gargoyles as "in on the ground floor [of] creating something iconic". Greg Weisman also describes himself as one of the creators of Gargoyles having included much of the folkloric, mythological, and historical elements.

The series' first season was almost entirely written by the husband-and-wife team of Michael Reaves and Brynne Chandler Reaves, who wrote 12 of the 13 episodes; the remaining episode was written by Steve Perry. All three writers were just coming off having written extensively for Batman: The Animated Series (for which Reaves won an Emmy, and Chandler Reaves an Emmy nomination). Weisman officially joined the series as a co-producer with episode 6 (though he also oversaw earlier episodes in his capacity as a Disney executive), and did not have any writing credits on the show until the third season. (Note: In an interview, Weisman said "During season one, all the writers – including Brynne and Lydia Marano (and a few others) – were working under Michael's supervision. And Michael was working under my supervision. We broke all the stories together, and I came up with most of the springboards myself and did the final, final pass on every script after Michael was done.")

The first season was developed on a sliding schedule; each phase of developing the thirteen episodes, such as writing, storyboarding, and animating, was given a ten-month period, with significant overlap. After they had delivered the first thirteen episodes, the production team asked Buena Vista Television to pick up a second season with another thirteen; the show had not yet aired, but Buena Vista agreed for them to start work on six more episodes. Once the show started its weekly syndication run in 1994, it was quickly seen as successful both as a television program and for promoting toy sales, and Buena Vista pushed the show's team to make the second season 52 episodes so that they could run it daily starting in the 1995 television season. Weisman stated they were not prepared for this given their production methods and the lack of timing to get those episodes ready for a fall 1995 premiere, despite telling Buena Vista this several times. When Disney refused to back down from the 52-episode order, the team decided to expand fourfold to handle the additional episodes. The writing staff grew to include Reaves, Chandler Reaves, and Perry, as well as newcomers Lydia Marano, Cary Bates, Gary Sperling, Adam Gilad, Diane Duane and Peter Morwood, amongst others. For this season, story editing duties were handled on a rotating basis by Reaves, Chandler Reaves, Bates, and Sperling. Storylines expanded beyond the Manhattan setting and more characters were added to help create stories to fill the episode count. Weisman said that he had discussions with Michael Eisner of using Gargoyles as a starting point for an action-oriented universe within Disney, comparing this to how Warner Bros. owned DC Comics, and some second-season episodes were used to set up potential hooks for these.

The second season finished with a definitive wrap-up story told over a series of final episodes. However, a third season was unexpectedly ordered—although the series order was reduced to thirteen episodes and moved to a Saturday morning slot. Around this point, Reaves, Chandler Reaves, Perry, and Sperling all left the show. Meanwhile, the reduced episode order was a result of two factors according to Weisman. The first was changes within Disney itself. The fallout from the death of Disney president Frank Wells led to the divide between Eisner and Jeffrey Katzenberg, and Katzenberg left to form DreamWorks. Weisman's bosses, Gary Krisel and Bruce Cranston, who had been supportive of Gargoyles, also left with Katzenberg for DreamWorks. Further, internal pressure on Eisner from Roy E. Disney forced him to treat Gargoyles as part of the studio's older works, thus dropping the larger action universe plans, and leaving the show without any support. Secondly, as the second season aired, the highly publicized trial of O. J. Simpson drew audiences away from Gargoyles often due to preemption from the trial's coverage. By the time the trial was over, Mighty Morphin Power Rangers had become more powerful as a brand.

At this point, the show staff did not think they were likely to get a third season (which is one reason why much of the writing staff moved on), but as Disney had just bought Capital Cities, the owners of the American Broadcasting Company (ABC) network, they needed programming for its Saturday morning block. They therefore had the mostly new Gargoyles team develop thirteen more episodes for it, now calling the series The Goliath Chronicles. Returning writers included Marano, Bates, and Gilad; Weisman also made his debut as a writer with the season opener. Because the series was on broadcast stations rather than syndication, the show had to meet different Broadcast Standards and Practices which Weisman stated drastically limited his creativity. While he wrote the first episode and spoke of his concerns to Disney, Weisman has contended Disney had removed him from the team and assigned the rest of the show's run to Nelvana leaving The Goliath Chronicles to be classified as being non-canon.

In May 2020, Weisman said in an interview, "Gargoyles is still my baby. I don't own it. I don't get a dime off of it being on Disney Plus. And yet I'm so thrilled that it is, I'm thrilled that it represents a chance — even if it's a slim chance — to bring it back. I've always wanted to do more. I've got a timeline for the show that's 315 pages long. I've got notebooks and comp books full of ideas for it. Spin-off notions and all sorts of things. Literally, nothing would make me happier than to go back and do more Gargoyles."

=== Influences ===
Many Shakespearean characters and stories found their way into the show's storylines, particularly those from Macbeth and A Midsummer Night's Dream. The series was also influenced by medieval Scottish history, as well as television shows ranging from Disney's Adventures of the Gummi Bears, to Hill Street Blues as well as Bonkers (in which Weisman himself co-produced). The latter in particular inspired the ensemble format of the series and the 30-second "Previously, on Gargoyles..." recap found at the beginning of later episodes. The former was an influence on the original comedy development of the show, which was subsequently made darker and more serious by first season writers Reaves, Chandler Reaves and Perry.

=== Lawsuit ===
New York artist Joe Tomasini brought a suit against Disney, claiming that his copyrighted screenplay and character designs had been copied during the development and production of Gargoyles. The case was ultimately thrown out, after it was proven that Disney did not have access to Tomasini's creations.

== Broadcast history ==
The first two seasons of Gargoyles aired in the Republic of Ireland on RTE Two on weekday afternoons from January 6 to April 1997.

In the United States, the series first reran on the USA Network, as part of their morning Action Extreme Team block. It later moved to Toon Disney (and later onto Jetix's lineup) and its successor Disney XD where it aired until 2012. ABC Family also aired the show for a brief time in 2004 as part of its weekday morning Jetix block.

== Home media ==
=== VHS and Laserdisc ===
The five-episode pilot "Awakening", edited into a single movie under the title Gargoyles the Movie: The Heroes Awaken, was released on VHS and Laserdisc on January 31, 1995, by Buena Vista Home Video.

| VHS name | Episode titles | Release date | Stock number |
|---|---|---|---|
| The Hunted | "The Thrill of the Hunt" & "Temptation" | October 11, 1995 | 5968 |
| The Force of Goliath | "Deadly Force" & "Enter Macbeth" | October 11, 1995 | 5969 |
| Deeds of Deception | "The Edge" & "Long Way to Morning" | April 9, 1996 | 6713 |
| Brothers Betrayed | "Her Brother's Keeper" & "Reawakening" | April 9, 1996 | 6714 |

=== DVD releases ===
| Season | Product | Episodes | DVD release date |
|---|---|---|---|
| 1 | The Complete First Season | 13 | December 7, 2004 |
| 2 | Season Two, Volume 1 | 26 | December 6, 2005 |
| 2 | Season Two, Volume 2 | 26 | June 25, 2013 |
| 3 | The Goliath Chronicles | 13 | —N/a |

=== Streaming ===
On October 14, 2019, it was confirmed that all 3 seasons of Gargoyles would be available for streaming on the Disney+ streaming service, on which the entire series has been available ever since its November 12, 2019 launch.

== Reception ==
Since its debut in 1994, Gargoyles has become critically acclaimed by fans and critics alike for its heavy focus on fairytales, folktales, comparative religion and mythology. IGN ranked Gargoyles 45th place on its 2009 list of top 100 animated series, stating: "A decent success at the time, Gargoyles has maintained a strong cult following since it ended more than a decade ago". Hollywood.com featured it on their 2010 list of six cartoons that should be movies. UGO.com included it on their 2011 top list of legendary medieval and fantasy TV shows. Doug Walker, also known as the Nostalgia Critic, praised the show: "But in secret, I would be watching every one of them, because it was just that good. I don't know if it really changed anything in terms of kids' shows like Batman or Animaniacs, but it was certainly a welcome detour from what Disney usually did. It really stood on its own and created some really wonderful and really unique stories. Gargoyles is a blast from the past that is sure to live on in the future." Craig Tomashoff, of People Magazine, said "All the traditional, wholesome Disney elements are in place, from a Beauty and the Beast-like plot line to the gargoyles' old-fashioned sense of nobility and morality. The result is a show that isn't bad, with impressive animation." Elizabeth Rayne of SyFy praised the series, stating "Gargoyles isn't just a Gothic fairy tale. There is hidden magic where you'd least expect it to lurk in that crumbling castle and, later, the clock tower they stand sentinel at night after night, watching over the city that never sleeps… the rock-solid message about friendship and loyalty embedded into every episode is something… [And] you can't leave the warped humor of this series in the dark, either." The show's first season holds a rare 100% rating on the film critic site Rotten Tomatoes. Less favorable assessments of the series came from animation producer Bruce Timm, who dismissed Gargoyles as "kind of namby-pamby... with all that Celtic fantasy crap" in a 1999 interview and the animation blog Cartoon Brew, which cited the series as an example of the sort of "juvenile mediocrities" that are beloved by the nerd community.

== Film adaptation ==
A traditionally animated film adaptation had been discussed by Disney since the beginning of the show's run. Todd Garner was the executive producer on a proposed project; having admired the series. Rick Baker was hired to create concept art for the characters and even made a maquette. Greg Weisman and Michael Reaves wrote a draft that adapted the five-part "Awakening" pilot, but it was rejected. Disney regular Jim Kouf was hired to pen a new draft that established Goliath as a Gaelic warrior named Goliath MacGrath who makes a deal with a good sorcerer to battle an evil one named Morgan. However, he and his men are cursed to "give up [their] flesh and blood and [their] heart will be turned to stone" and are promptly turned into gargoyles and turn to stone upon defeating Morgan. In modern day, the focus shifts to Alex Anderson, described as "Goliath's long-lost relative", who returns to New York City following the death of his father. He teams up with Detective Brenna, who is a stand-in for Elisa Maza, and meets the Gargoyles who must battle a revived Morgan. While Disney favored the script, the project was abandoned as it would have been expensive to produce and because the series had ended its run.

In July 2011, David Elliot and Paul Lovett of G.I. Joe: The Rise of Cobra were hired to pen a film adaptation of Gargoyles. In June 2018, Jordan Peele pitched his own film version to Disney, but it was not picked up.

== Potential reboot ==
In 2020, Super Robot Monkey Team Hyperforce Go! creator Ciro Nieli pitched a Gargoyles reboot to Disney Television Animation. The new series would have been a sequel to the original with the premise of "Canmore casting a spell where it sets the Manhattan Clan back in to deep sleep while he takes over the 5 Burroughs of NYC with crime lords and monster beasts. 25 years later Elisa Maza raises the Gargoyles back from their spell and the fight to take back the city begins". The project would get scrapped due to cuts that affected The Walt Disney Company during the COVID-19 pandemic.

In October 2023, it was announced that Disney Television Studios and Atomic Monster where developing a live-action Gargoyles series for Disney+ with Gary Dauberman as showrunner and James Wan and Michael Clear as executive producers. In April 2025, Dauberman would mention that the project was still alive promising that it would keep the same tone as the original. In August 2026, Weisman confirmed at FAN EXPO Chicago that the live-action series won't move forward at Disney+.

In July 2026, Brent Spiner, who voiced Puck in the original series, hinted at his podcast "Dropping Names with Brent and Jonny" that a full-on revival of the animated series was in the works at Disney Television Animation.

In November 2026, Seth Rogen expressed interest in reviving the series trought Point Grey Pictures.

== Merchandise ==
Various merchandise released for the series included a series of 22 five-inch action figures (along with two vehicles and a castle playset) released by Kenner in 1995. A collectible card game, Gargoyles Stone Warriors Battle Card Game, was published by Parker Brothers in 1994. Other licensed merchandise included numerous other toys and figures, collectible trading card and sticker series, and a wide range of clothing items, books, art supplies, kitchen and bathroom items and supplies, clocks and watches, etc. A world based on the television series was initially considered for Kingdom Hearts, but the idea was scrapped.

In 2018, various Funko Pop Vinyl figurines was released. In August 2021, Ravensburger released the Disney Gargoyles: Awakening board game. Starting in 2021, NECA began producing Gargoyles-based merchandise, such a plush toys and figures of the characters. Quantum Mechanix also produced a line of Q-Fig statues of the Gargoyles characters, starting with Goliath and Demona in January 2021.

On May 6, 2025, Ravensburger announced that cards featuring Gargoyles characters would be included in the Disney Lorcana Trading Card Game starting in the Whispers in the Well set to be released in the fourth quarter of 2025.

=== Comics ===
==== Disney Adventures and TV Guide ====
Eleven Gargoyles comic stories were created for the Disney Adventures magazine, first appearing in the November 1994 issue, with the final story being printed in the January 1997 issue. The editor of the comics was Heidi MacDonald, who was put in charge of the production of these comics. Greg Weisman had some involvement with the comic, with Heidi recalling a two-hour story conference with him. He would corroborate this, stating, "I was involved. Just not on level of my SLG involvement."

Heidi would write one comic herself, "The Experts", and would also write a short Gargoyles comic for the October 19–25, 1996 issue of TV Guide, entitled "Be Afraid of the Dark".

==== Marvel ====
Eleven issues were produced under Marvel and released between February 1995 and December 1995. The series was canceled due to low sales and the overall plot is left unconcluded. Weisman was eventually hired to write for the comic, but Marvel cut the deal with Disney before his run could be produced. Weisman still had his unpublished script for the comic and would eventually use it as issue #6 of the Gargoyles: Clan-Building SLG comic series. As of July 24, 2022, Dynamite Entertainment planned to republish these comics "at a later date." In 2025, Marvel publised two crossover comic one-shots with the Fantastic Four, titled Fantastic Four/Gargoyles #1 and Gargoyles x Fantastic Four #1, written by Gargoyles creator Greg Weisman.

==== Olé! Disney ====
In the thirteenth issue of the Spanish Disney comic series "Olé! Disney", a 44-page comic adaptation of the film compilation of the first five episodes "Heroes Awaken!", entitled "Gargoyles: Héroes Mitológicos", was produced. It was written by Regis Maine, illustrated by Jesús Redondo, and colored by Jean-Jacques Chagnaud. It was released in 1996. It would also be released in French and German, though no English release was ever made.

==== Slave Labor Graphics ====
On June 21, 2006, Slave Labor Graphics, in association with CreatureComics, began producing a new Gargoyles comic written by Greg Weisman. Weisman wrote the comic book series as a direct sequel to the first and second seasons, ignoring the third season and telling his preferred story in its place. The first two issues are an adaptation of Weisman's script of the first episode of The Goliath Chronicles named The Journey serving as the only link to that show.

In August 2008, Greg Weisman announced that, due to Disney increasing its licensing fees, Slave Labor Graphics would not be renewing its license of Gargoyles after it ran out on August 31, 2008. The final two issues of Bad Guys and four of Gargoyles were released in the comic trades collecting both series in August 2009. Weisman also stated that SLG president Dan Vado had not given up on the Gargoyles franchise and hoped to pursue the idea of Gargoyles graphic novels in the future. As of July 24, 2022, Dynamite Entertainment planned to republish these comics "at a later date."

==== Joe Books ====
On December 24, 2015, Aaron Sparrow revealed that Gargoyles was to be adapted into a cinestory comics series published by Joe Books Inc. Originally, the first volume was intended to be released on March 30, 2016, adapting the five-part "Awakening" episodes from the first season, and second volume would have adapted the next four episodes ("The Thrill of the Hunt", "Temptation", "Deadly Force", and "Enter MacBeth") following the pilot. However, on September 29, 2017, Joe Books Inc. confirmed that the cinestory has been cancelled.

==== Dynamite Entertainment ====
On July 22, 2022, a new ongoing Gargoyles comic written by Greg Weisman was announced that would be published by Dynamite Entertainment and depict "Season 4" of the TV series. The 18 issues produced under Slave Labor Graphics remain as the canonical third season instead of The Goliath Chronicles. On October 29, 2022, Dynamite Entertainment announced they received 100,000 pre-orders of the first issue, making it Dynamite's highest selling comic of the year. A one-shot Halloween special focusing on Brooklyn's son, Nashville, was released in October 2023.

On April 20, 2023, Dynamite Entertainment announced that a spin-off title, Gargoyles: Dark Ages, had been green-lit. It was released in July 2023. Gargoyles: Dark Ages is set in the year 971, during the era when Hudson is still the leader of the Wyvern clan, depicting events that will lead to alliance between gargoyles and humans as they work together to repel impending dark forces. The comic is written by Greg Weisman and illustrated by Drew Moss.

On October 9, 2023, Dynamite Entertainment announced that the comics had been green lit for a continuation under the title of Gargoyles: Quest, for release in January 2024. The focus would be Demona as the main character seeking to obtain the "New Keys to Power", a set of ancient, magical artifacts that could grant her unimaginable power in her crusade against humanity. The comic is written by Greg Weisman and illustrated by Pasquale Qualano.

On April 24, 2025, two one-shot crossovers with Marvel's Fantastic Four were announced. One, called Fantastic Four/Gargoyles, was released by Marvel on October 15 of that year. The other, similarly named Gargoyles/Fantastic Four, was released on November 12 by Dynamite.

=== Video games ===
- The Handheld LCD game, titled Gargoyles – Night Flight, was released by Tiger Electronics in 1995 in China.
- A Sega Genesis game, titled Gargoyles, was released by Disney Software in 1995.
- During Disney D23 in 2022, an announcement trailer for a remastered version of the 1995 Sega Genesis game was released. Developed by Empty Clip Studios, it launched on October 19, 2023. It has updated visuals, achievements, and enhancements to the gameplay.
- In Disney's mobile game Disney Heroes: Battle Mode, Goliath and Demona appear as playable characters.
- In the mobile game Disney Sorcerer's Arena, Goliath, Demona, and Xanatos appear as playable characters.
- In Disney Emoji Blitz app game, the characters appear as playable characters and NPCs.

== Cultural impact ==
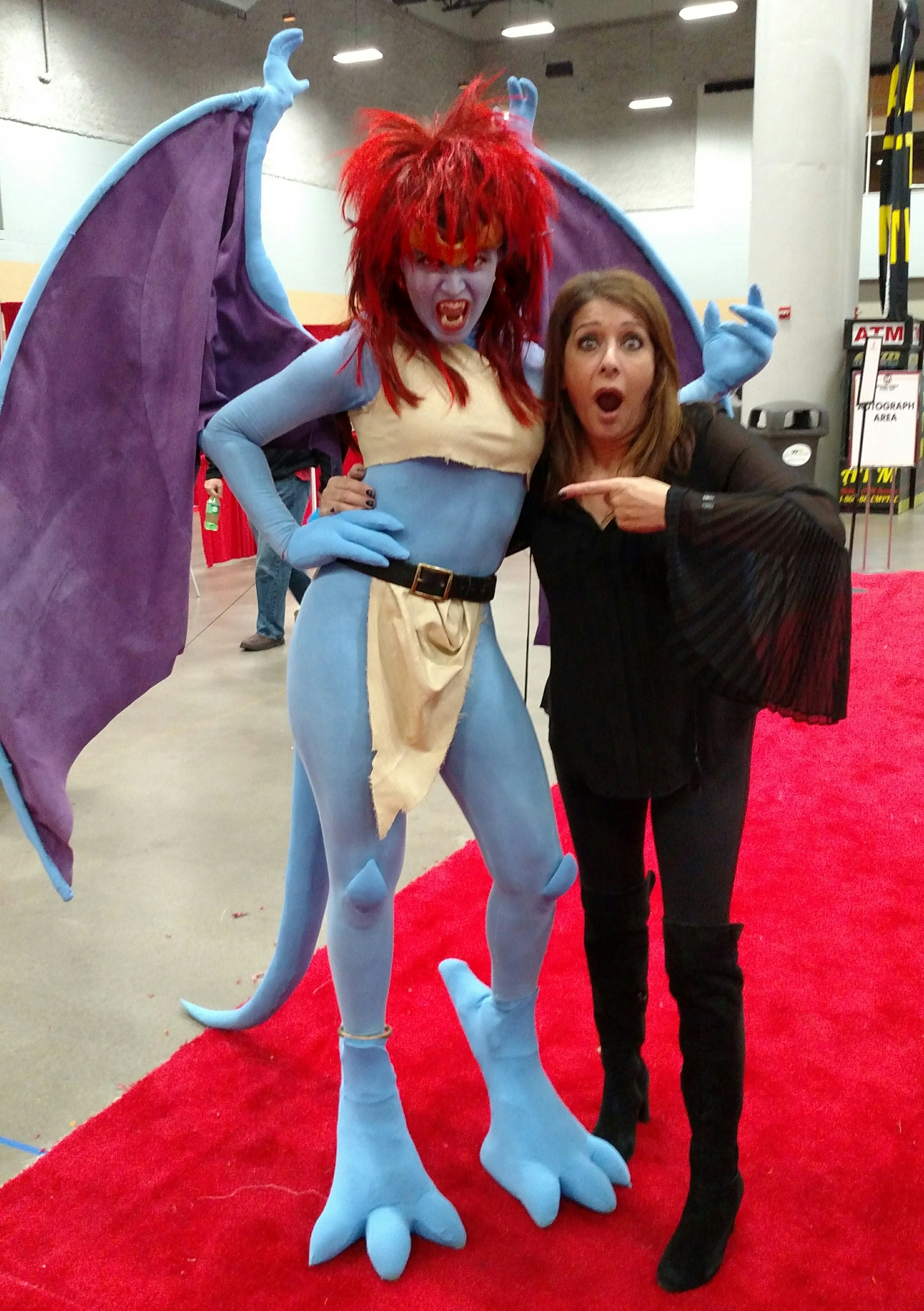
Cosplayer as Demona with voice actress Marina Sirtis, on the convention floor at Wizard World Des Moines 2017.

=== Fan community ===
In 1997, Weisman began answering fan questions about the series in an online forum at Ask Greg, revealing, among other things, productions details about the series, in-universe details about the characters, and his plans for the property if it had not been cancelled or if he was able to revive it in the future. Among other revelations, Weisman has detailed spinoffs for the series that reached various stages of development, including Bad Guys (for which a leica reel and comics were produced), Gargoyles 2198, Timedancer, Pendragon, Dark Ages and The New Olympians.

==== Conventions ====
The Gathering of the Gargoyles
- Status: Defunct
- Genre: Science fantasy
- Venue: Various
- Location: Various
- Country: U.S. and Canada
- Inaugurated: 1997
- Most recent: 2009
- Website: The Gathering of the Gargoyles

The Gathering of the Gargoyles was an annual fan convention which began in 1997 and ended in 2009. The Gathering featured several regular guests close to the Gargoyles franchise including Greg Weisman and voice actors Keith David and Thom Adcox. The Gathering has featured several recurring special events such as a radio play where attendees audition and take speaking roles, a masquerade ball where attendees dress up as their favorite character, an art show where the many artists within the fandom can display or sell their artwork. Weisman has in the past shown the leica reel of Bad Guys at Gatherings. Footage and interviews from the 2004 Gathering appear as an extra feature on the Season 1 DVD of the show.

CONvergence 2014 featured a Gargoyles related theme with many guests from the series including Greg Weisman, Thom Adcox, Marina Sirtis, C. Robert Cargill, Scott Lynch, Amy Berg, and Emma Bull. It is a four-day convention held in Bloomington, Minnesota over the Fourth of July weekend. It was done to celebrate the series' 20th anniversary.

=== References in other works ===
As a nod to members of the voice cast who worked on both series, the 2001 Pioneer LDC English dub of the anime 3×3 Eyes contains Gargoyles homage scenes. These include a homeless man humming the Gargoyles theme and a character who wonders "What could make claw marks in solid stone?" Shared actors included Brigitte Bako, Bill Fagerbakke, Thom Adcox-Hernandez, Keith David and Ed Asner.

The series finale of the 2017 DuckTales animated series, "The Last Adventure!", features an extended Gargoyles homage. During a battle, the character Manny the Headless Man-Horse is briefly turned to stone before transforming into his "true form", which heavily resembles a gargoyle. The sequence is accompanied by an excerpt from the Gargoyles theme tune, and Manny quotes Goliath's "I live again!" during his transformation, with Keith David providing his voice.

A drawing of Goliath made a cameo in the Amphibia episode "True Colors", which features David as the voice of King Andrias. Creator Matt Braly, who has expressed his love for Gargoyles, said the cameo was added in hopes of starting speculations of a multiverse of Disney Television Animation series, as the series is set in multiple universes. He also cited Gargoyles as an influence on Amphibia's overarching story and voice work.
