= The Deep Below =

- Poster for The Deep Below
- Directed by: Rod Slane
- Written by: Screenplay: Rod Slane
- Produced by: Jill Noonan
- Starring: Jason Dohring; Marina Sirtis; Michael Dorn
- Cinematography: Rod Slane
- Edited by: Alex Cristo
- Music by: Paul Cristo
- Distributed by: Zepper Pictures
- Release date: March 13, 2007
- Running time: DVD Edition: 84 min.
- Country: United States
- Language: English

The Deep Below is a feature film released directly to DVD in March 2007 by Zepper Pictures. Directed by Rod Slane, who also co-written with Ami Neder, the film stars Jason Dohring, Marina Sirtis and Michael Dorn. The film was produced by Extended Family Entertainment, an Oklahoma-based production company. Originally entitled "Walking on Water," the film was ultimately released under the title 'The Deep Below.'

== Plot ==
The movie is loosely based on the story of a town in Oklahoma that had to be moved as a result of the construction of a dam creating Lake Keystone. There is a local legend about a train carrying gold in the 1800s which overturned. The gold is said to have rolled off the mountain pass into the valley, which is now at the bottom of the lake.

The writers updated the story to be about young Will Taylor (Dohring), who witnessed the murder of his father and aunt, who had waited in the old bank building for the funds to be moved to the new bank building, just prior to the flooding of the town. The guards who are supposed to transport the funds instead rob the bank and murder its owner. Will grows up and now works on the Lake that hides the secrets of his past.

As Will learns about his history and the submerged treasure, the villain, Carl Bennett (Dorn) returns from prison to collect the money he left at the bottom of the lake.

== Production ==
Principal photography began on July 14, 2003 and continued until August 14, 2003. Most scenes were shot in and around Sand Springs, Oklahoma. Most interior scenes were shot at Zepper Studios facility, then in Sand Springs. All water scenes were shot at Keystone Lake. The entire shooting schedule was faced with the hottest days recorded for the area in decades. Temperatures rose as high as 118 degrees, which was devastating to the schedule. With 115+ degree weather outdoors, some of the interior scenes were shot in temperatures that approached 125 degrees on the set. At one point, Marina Sirtis suffered heat stroke on the set which resulted in certain scenes being cancelled.

== Post-production and aftermath ==
Soon after production ended, a dispute arose between the studio and the production team regarding reshoots and how to complete the film. The dispute resulted in the production team removing the HD Tape masters from the safe and refusing to return them. The standoff continued until December 2004, when a negotiated settlement was made and the master tapes were deposited with an escrow agent. Subsequently, the studio undertook to purchase the masters at a sheriff's sale, which occurred on March 24, 2005. However, once in possession of the masters, it was discovered that less than half of the 210 scenes in the final script were actually shot. The film was less than 50% completed.

== Completion of the film ==
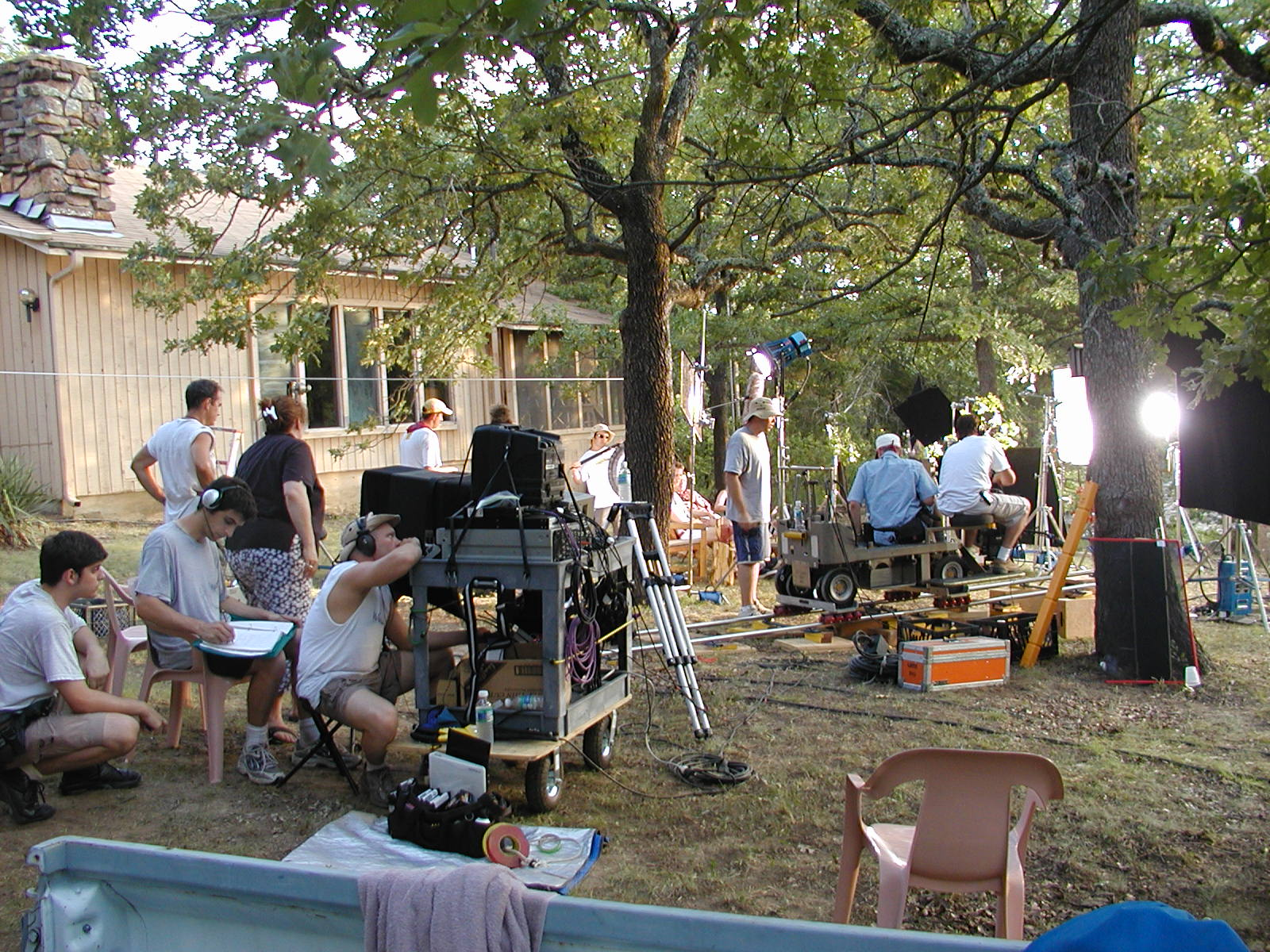
On the set of The Deep Below.

With less than half of the story scenes available, it was determined that the story would make no sense to someone watching the film. The studio determined that the cost of reshooting was too high as an alternative, so the vote was to destroy the tapes and write it down as a complete loss. It was then that Paul Cristo and Alex Cristo suggested an alternative. Using the existing footage of scenes that were shot to establish a complete listing of the dialogue, Alex Cristo assembled an alternate story using the existing lines of dialogue. While it would not produce a strong story line, it would result in a completed film.

Given a go-ahead by the studio, Alex Cristo edited the new film. To film trivia buffs, there are a few scenes where there is no dialogue, but yet, if you look closely will see the actor's lips move (not unlike the old English-dubbed kung fu movies made in China). That is a result of stealing a scene from the limited available footage in order to insert the shot elsewhere. Once an edited master was completed, Paul Cristo composed and recorded the complete musical score.

There have been a number of poor reviews and comments about this film. But given the daunting task required to write a completely new story from existing dialogue and end up with a story that actually makes any sense at all, the studio felt the accomplishment of these two filmmakers was an incredible feat.
