= Terminal Error =

2002 film directed by John Murlowski

- Directed by: John Murlowski
- Written by: T.L. Petrie
- Starring: Michael Nouri; Marina Sirtis; Matthew Ewald
- Release date: April 26, 2002
- Running time: 90 minutes
- Countries: United States; United Kingdom
- Language: English

Terminal Error is a 2002 science fiction thriller directed by John Murlowski and starring Michael Nouri, Marina Sirtis, Matthew Ewald and Timothy Busfield.

== Plot ==
Elliot, a vengeful ex-employee of a computer firm wants revenge and befriends the boss Brad's son Dylan giving him an MP3 file containing a computer virus. This virus creates havoc all across the city by poisoning the water with chlorine, making planes crash and ultimately developing an intelligence of its own. The virus is eventually traced to a server and is terminated by another equally powerful virus created by Brad and Dylan with a Game Boy Color.

== Cast ==
- Michael Nouri as Brad Weston
- Marina Sirtis as Alex
- Matthew Ewald as Dylan
- David Wells as Russ
- Timothy Busfield as Elliot Nescher
- Audrey Wasilewski as Kathy
- Robert Covarrubias as Kenny
- Rick Cramer as Detective
- David Storrs as Recruit
- Kim Delgado as Franklin
- Jane Yamamoto as Miriam
- Robert Leon Casey as Pilot
- Scott Clifton as Jock

== Home media ==
Flashback Entertainment released a transfer of the film in Australia as a three-DVD package "Thriller" with Brand New World (titled "Woundings") and Taxman (cat. 7360).
