= Spectres (film) =

- Directed by: Phil Leirness
- Written by: Bud Robertson
- Produced by: Robert Ballo; Bud Robertson
- Starring: Marina Sirtis; Dean Haglund; Tucker Smallwood
- Cinematography: Robert Ballo
- Edited by: Edward Bishop
- Music by: John Boegehold
- Production company: Shadowland
- Distributed by: Lifetime Movie Network; Xenon Pictures
- Release dates: February 1, 2004 (London Sci-Fi and Fantasy Film Festival); June 2, 2005
- Running time: 98 minutes
- Country: United States
- Language: English

Spectres is a 2004 supernatural drama film directed by Phil Leirness and starring by Marina Sirtis, Dean Haglund and Tucker Smallwood.

== Plot ==
Kelly is a 16-year-old suicide survivor, her mother Laura Lee is at a loss when it comes to what should be done next so she takes Kelly away for the summer to a holiday home. But strange things start happening and Kelly starts acting like a different person. Kelly's therapist, Dr. Halsey, seeks the assistance of a psychic.

== Cast ==
- Marina Sirtis as Laura Lee
- Dean Haglund as Dr. Halsey
- Tucker Smallwood as Will Franklin
- Lauren Birkell as Kelly Webber
- Alexis Cruz as Sean
- Chris Hardwick as Sam Phillips
- Loanne Bishop as Suzanne
- Linda Park as Renee Hansen
- David Hedison as William
- Alexander Agate as C.J. Hansen
- Lillian Lehman as Fran Mullins
- Joe Smith as Mark
- Neil Dickson as Wally
