= Marina Sirtis =

British actress (born 1955)

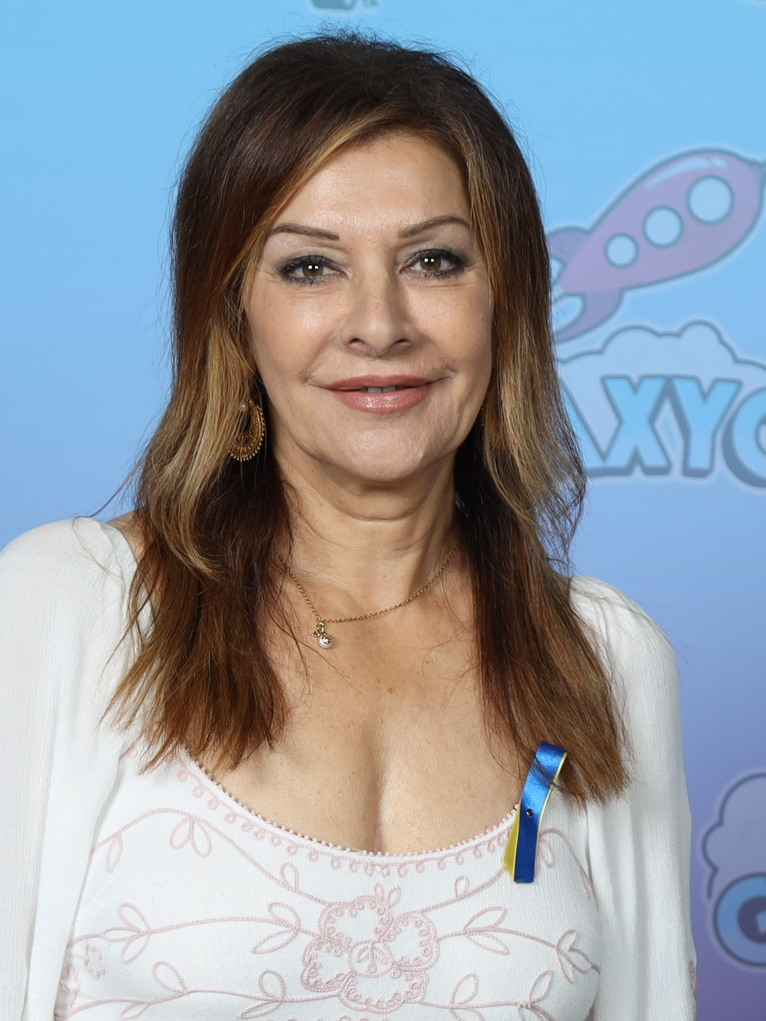
- Sirtis at GalaxyCon Raleigh in 2023
- Born: 29 March 1955 (age 71); London, England
- Citizenship: United Kingdom; United States
- Education: Guildhall School of Music and Drama
- Occupation: Actress
- Years active: 1977–present
- Known for: Star Trek: The Next Generation, the four subsequent films, and Star Trek: Picard
- Spouse: Michael Lamper (m. 1992; died 2019)
- Website: www.marinasirtis.tv

Marina Sirtis (/ˈsɜːrtɪs/; born 29 March 1955) is a British actress. She is best known for her role as Counselor Deanna Troi on the television series Star Trek: The Next Generation and four Star Trek feature films, as well as other appearances in the Star Trek franchise.

== Early life ==
Marina Sirtis was born in Hackney, London, the daughter of Greek parents: Despina, a tailor's assistant, and John Sirtis. She was brought up in Harringay, North London.

When she was three years old, Sirtis says, the teenage sons of her babysitter sexually molested her. Sirtis developed an eating disorder due to the trauma of the assault. After suffering the disorder for 20 years, she went into therapy in the 1990s; she was able to manage the trauma and learn to eat healthily again.

While still in secondary school, Sirtis secretly auditioned for drama school against her parents' wishes, ultimately being accepted to the Guildhall School of Music and Drama. She graduated from Guildhall in 1976 at the age of 21 and began her career by joining the Connaught Theatre.

In 1986, Sirtis emigrated to the United States, settling in Los Angeles to boost her career. She later became a naturalized U.S. citizen.

== Career ==
=== Early work ===
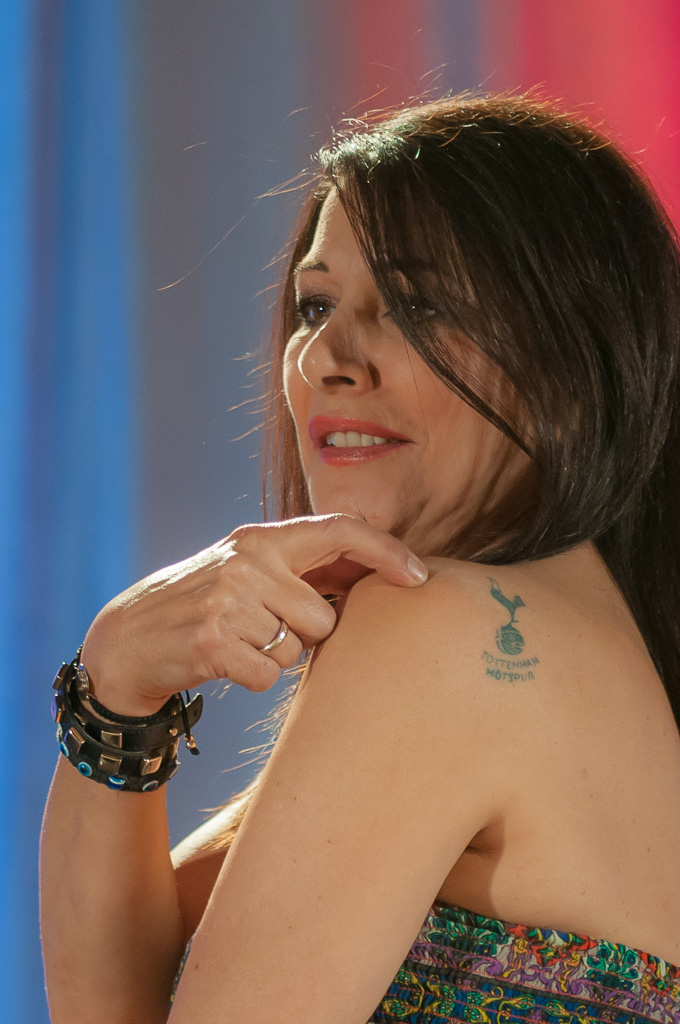
Sirtis showing her tattoo of the logo of English football team Tottenham Hotspur at the 2012 Phoenix Comicon

Sirtis started her career as a member of the repertory company at the Connaught Theatre, Worthing, West Sussex, in 1976. Directed by Nic Young, she appeared in Joe Orton's What the Butler Saw and as Ophelia in Hamlet.

Before her role in Star Trek, Sirtis was featured in supporting roles in several films. In the 1983 Faye Dunaway film The Wicked Lady, she engaged in a whip fight with Dunaway. In the Charles Bronson sequel Death Wish 3 (1985), Sirtis' character is a rape victim. In the 1984 film Blind Date, she appears as a prostitute who is murdered by a madman.

Other early works include numerous guest-starring roles on British television series. Sirtis appeared in Raffles (1977), Who Pays the Ferryman (1977), Hazell (1978), Minder (1979), Up the Elephant and Round the Castle (1985), and The Return of Sherlock Holmes (1986). She also played the flight attendant in a 1979 Cinzano Bianco television commercial starring Leonard Rossiter and Joan Collins, in which Collins was splattered with drink.

=== Star Trek ===
==== Star Trek: The Next Generation ====
In 1986, Sirtis relocated to the United States. When casting Star Trek: The Next Generation, Gene Roddenberry was inspired to ask Sirtis, whose appearance he considered "exotic", to audition for a role after seeing the film Aliens with Bob Justman, which featured the prominent Latina character Vasquez, played by Jenette Goldstein. Sirtis and Denise Crosby initially tried out for each other's eventual roles on The Next Generation. Sirtis' character was going to be named Lt. Macha Hernandez, the Security Chief. Gene Roddenberry decided to switch them, and Macha Hernandez became Tasha Yar. Sirtis recalls that on the day she received the call offering her the role, she was actually packing to return to Britain because her six-month visa had expired.

Deanna Troi is a half-human, half-Betazoid. Her Betazoid abilities allow her to read the emotions of others. Her position on the Enterprise-D is ship's counselor, looking after the crew's well-being and serving as trusted advisor to Captain Picard, with a position next to him on the bridge. Initially, the writers found it difficult to write for Troi and had left the character out of four first-season episodes. Sirtis felt her job was in jeopardy after the first season, but was overjoyed when Roddenberry took her aside at Jonathan Frakes' wedding and told her that the season-two premiere episode would center on Troi.

Sirtis appeared in all seven seasons of Star Trek: The Next Generation, and her character was developed from a more passive therapist to a tougher Starfleet officer. She has stated her favourite episode is season six's "Face of the Enemy", in which Troi is kidnapped and surgically altered to pose as a Romulan. Troi's switching to a standard Starfleet uniform in the same season in "Chain of Command" elevated the character's dignity in Sirtis' eyes, and her enthusiasm in playing her, with Sirtis commenting, "It covered up my cleavage and, consequently, I got all my brains back, because when you have a cleavage you can't have brains in Hollywood. So I got all my brains back and I was allowed to do things that I hadn't been allowed to do for five or six years. I went on away teams, I was in charge of staff, I had my pips back, I had phasers, I had all the equipment again, and it was fabulous. I was absolutely thrilled."

During her time on the show, she became close friends with her co-stars Jonathan Frakes (who played Commander Riker), Michael Dorn (Lieutenant Worf) and Brent Spiner (Lieutenant Commander Data). The latter cast members were groomsmen at her wedding.

She wore black-coloured contact lenses during the seven-year run of Star Trek: The Next Generation and the subsequent films because her character had black eyes. Her own eyes are light brown.

She usually wore hairpieces for her role as Troi. Sirtis' real hair was slightly shorter and, although curly, was not as bouffant as her character's. However, Sirtis' real hair was used in the pilot episode, and also in the first six episodes of season six, in which Troi sported a more natural looking pony-tailed style. She was also asked to create an accent (described as a mixture of Eastern European and Israeli) for her character, although her natural accent is Cockney. Over time, the accent was adjusted and became more Americanized.

==== Other Star Trek works ====
Sirtis reprised her character in the feature films Star Trek Generations (1994), Star Trek: First Contact (1996), Star Trek: Insurrection (1998), and Star Trek: Nemesis (2002).

Sirtis was delighted to get the chance to do some comedy in Star Trek: First Contact and said, "I loved it because it opened the door to a different side of Troi we'd never seen before. That door has stayed open and that whole kind of wacky, zany Troi thing has continued into the next movie, which is great for me because I like to do things that are different." Sirtis stated of her role in Star Trek: Nemesis, "I sort of had an inkling that I was going to have a good part in this film because John Logan was such a big fan of the character. So I knew that he would do her some justice."

Sirtis also appeared in Star Trek: Voyager for three episodes toward the end of the series (1999 and 2000), and the series finale of Star Trek: Enterprise (2005). In 2020, Sirtis reprised her role as Deanna Troi in the Star Trek: Picard episode "Nepenthe". She also came back for season 3 with the rest of the Next Generation cast. She also later appeared in the role in "No Small Parts", the first-season finale of Star Trek: Lower Decks.

Sirtis voiced the Enterprise's computer in the web series Star Trek Continues.

=== Other work ===
While filming Star Trek: The Next Generation, Sirtis returned to the UK during the hiatus between seasons three and four in 1990 to film a drama special titled One Last Chance for the BBC. In 1992, she appeared in an episode of the short-lived series The Fifth Corner and had a cameo in the horror/fantasy film Waxwork II: Lost in Time. After the end of Star Trek: The Next Generation in 1994, Sirtis continued to work regularly. Her first role was a departure from previous work, an abused wife in the series Heaven Help Us.

She provided the voice of Demona in the animated Disney television series Gargoyles for two seasons starting in 1994. Her Next Generation co-stars, Frakes (as the voice of David Xanatos), Spiner and Dorn, also lent their voices to the show. She voiced the character again for an episode of the unmade animated series Team Atlantis.

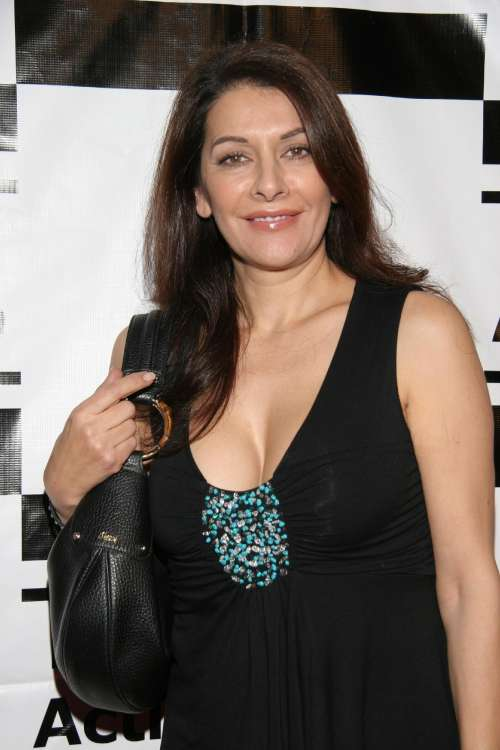
Marina Sirtis at a Star Trek Convention, 2008

In 1996, Sirtis starred as a villainous police detective in the British made-for-television film, Gadgetman. She played a villainess once again when she guest-starred as a race-track owner under investigation following the death of a driver in Diagnosis: Murder in 1998. The independent film Paradise Lost, with Sirtis in a starring role, was released in 1999.

Beginning in 1999, Sirtis returned to science-fiction television in a number of roles starting with The Outer Limits. The same year, she appeared in Earth: Final Conflict, originally created by Gene Roddenberry. In 2000, she played a Russian scientist in Stargate SG-1. Sirtis was interviewed in the October 2000 issue of SFX magazine in the UK; the cover stated, "Marina Sirtis is Everywhere", also referring to her reprisal of her character Deanna Troi on Star Trek: Voyager.

In 2001, Sirtis made a highly publicised appearance on the long-running British hospital drama Casualty. She played a politician with controversial views on the National Health Service. When she meets with a man with whom she is having an affair at a hotel, she is caught in an explosion. She appeared in the made-for-television films Terminal Error in 2002 and Net Games in 2003. Also in 2003, she guest-starred in the ABC series Threat Matrix playing a biological weapons scientist from Iraq.

Sirtis starred in the film Spectres in 2004, and at ShockerFest International Film Festival, she won the best actress award.

Sirtis had a minor role in the Academy Award-winning ensemble film Crash as the wife of the Persian shopkeeper. Following this, she played another Middle Eastern role in the series The Closer in 2005. In 2006, she had a three-episode recurring role as a love match-maker on Girlfriends, and she guest-starred in Without a Trace. In 2007, Sirtis starred in the SyFy channel production of Grendel, where she played Queen Onela. Independent film Trade Routes, The Deep Below, and Lesser of Three Evils were released. She provided the voice for Matriarch Benezia in the critically acclaimed video game Mass Effect on Xbox 360, PlayStation 3, and PC.

In 2008, she made a guest appearance in an episode of the Casualty spin-off series Holby City. The same year, the sci-fi/drama film Inalienable, written by Star Trek alumnus Walter Koenig, was released. Sirtis said of her role, "I actually play the Deputy Attorney General of the United States, so I'm a bad guy, a mean lawyer, which was fantastic."

The direct-to-DVD sequels Green Street 2 and The Grudge 3, featuring Sirtis, were released in 2009. She co-starred in the British film 31 North 62 East as the prime minister's top aide; it had a limited theatrical release in the UK. Sirtis guest-starred in the first episode of the short-lived hospital drama Three Rivers. She returned to SyFy in December 2009 in the disaster film Annihilation Earth.

In 2010, Sirtis guest-starred as a Swiss doctor in two episodes of ABC Family's Make It or Break It. In May 2010, Sirtis announced that she would be providing the voice for comic-book villainess Queen Bee in the Young Justice animated series. She provided her voice for a number of episodes from 2011 until its cancellation in 2013. In March 2011, Sirtis guest-starred on an episode of Grey's Anatomy. She played an Iranian mother who was at the hospital to participate in a medical trial for Alzheimer's disease.

In 2012, the vampire film Speed Demons, in which Sirtis co-starred, was released to pay-per-view services. The same year, she played a fortune teller in the Castlevania fan-made series posted on YouTube. She accepted a recurring role as director of Mossad on NCIS. Her character, Orli Elbaz, succeeds Eli David (portrayed by Michael Nouri) and was introduced in the season-10 episode "Berlin", which aired in April 2013. She subsequently appeared in the second episode of season 11, which aired in early October 2013, and in the season 13 finale "Family First".

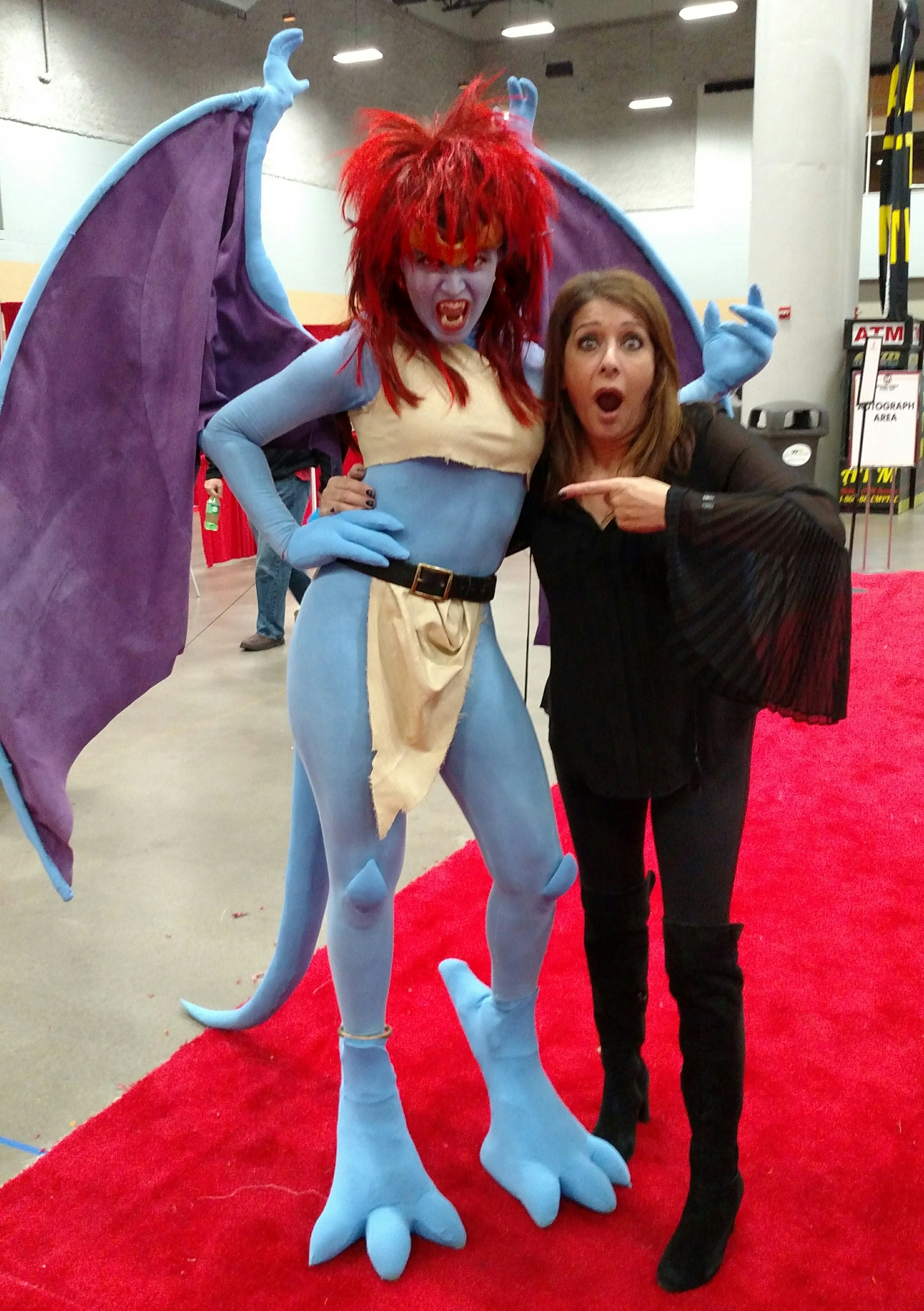
Sirtis with a Demona cosplayer at Wizard World Des Moines 2017

In 2014, she co-starred in the SyFy channel horror film Finders Keepers. The following year, she appeared in the British film A Dark Reflection, and in 2016, Sirtis starred in the Hallmark Channel film My Summer Prince. In 2019, Sirtis made her London West End stage debut in Dark Sublime, playing the character of Marianne, a freelance actor and now-forgotten icon of a British sci-fi TV show, whose encounter with a fan changes both of their lives.

In 2019, the video game Elite Dangerous released an alternative voice (named Carina) for the 'COVAS' in-game ship computer, voiced by Sirtis. She also played a school teacher in Season 3 of Seth MacFarlane's The Orville.

== Personal life ==
Sirtis married Michael Lamper, an actor and rock guitarist, in 1992. Lamper died in his sleep on 7 December 2019. In 2021, Sirtis moved back to London, citing Lamper's death, and a desire for career opportunities in British film and television.

After Patrick Stewart's death, Sirtis recounted how Stewart would invite her for socially-distanced lunches in his garden after the death of her husband, and over the first year of the COVID-19 pandemic. Sirtis and Stewart shared a joint love of football. Sirtis is a fan of Tottenham Hotspur F.C., while Stewart was a fan of Huddersfield Town A.F.C.. When the two teams met in 2018, both Sirtis and Stewart gave interviews, and in the match-day programme the contest was called the Star Trek derby.

== Filmography ==
=== Film ===
Year	Title	Role	Note
1983	The Wicked Lady	Jackson's Girl	
1983	Space Riders	Girl In Porsche	
1984	Blind Date	Hooker	
1985	Death Wish 3	Maria Rodriguez	
1992	Waxwork II: Lost in Time	Gloria	
1994	Star Trek Generations	Deanna Troi	
1996	Star Trek: First Contact	Deanna Troi	
1998	Star Trek: Insurrection	Deanna Troi	
1999	Paradise Lost	Christine DuMaurier	
2002	Star Trek: Nemesis	Deanna Troi	
2002	Terminal Error	Alex	
2004	Spectres	Laura Lee	
2004	Crash	Shereen	
2007	Fist of the Warrior	Mary	
2007	The Deep Below	Sarah	
2007	Game of Life	Mrs Rafiki	
2008	InAlienable	Attorney Barry	
2009	Green Street 2: Stand Your Ground	Veronica Mavis	
2009	The Grudge 3	Gretchen	
2009	31 North 62 East	Sarah Webber	
2014	Finders Keepers	Janine	
2014	Electric Boogaloo: The Wild, Untold Story of Cannon Films	Herself	
2015	A Dark Reflection (aka Flight 313: The Conspiracy)	Maggie Jaspar	
2016	Little Dead Rotting Hood	Esmerelda Winfield / Grandmother	
2017	The Assassin's Apprentice	Miranda	
2017	My Christmas Prince	Felicia Holst	
2018	5th Passenger	Alana	
2020	Max Winslow and the House of Secrets	H.A.V.E.N	
2020	Debt Collectors	Mallory "Mal" Reese	
2020	Unbelievable!!!!!	Award Show Presenter	
2021	The Bezonians	Helen Andinos	
2022	A Thousand Little Cuts	Monica Atlas	
2024	The Phantom Warrior	Medusa	
2025	Dream Hacker	Charlotte	

=== Television ===
Year	Title	Role	Note
1977	Raffles	Faustina	
1977	Who Pays the Ferryman?	Ariadne	
1978	Hazell	Melina Stassinopolus	
1978	The Thief of Baghdad	Harem Girl	Television film
1979	Cinzano Commercial	Stewardess	TV commercial
1979	Minder	Stella	Episode: "Aces High...And Sometimes Very Low"
1982	Kelly Monteith	Uncredited	
1985	Up the Elephant and Round the Castle	Lisa	
1986	Room at the Bottom	Carla	Episode "The Big Prize"
1986	Call Me Mister	Sally	
1986	The Return of Sherlock Holmes	Lucrezia Venucci	Episode: "The Six Napoleons"
1987	Hunter	Kate Scanlon	Episode: "Down and Under"
1987–1994	Star Trek: The Next Generation	Counselor Deanna Troi	176 episodes
1988	Reading Rainbow	Herself	Episode: "The Bionic Bunny Show"
1990	One Last Chance	Maria	Television film
1993	Griffin and Sabine	Sabine	Voice
1994	Heaven Help Us	Carolyn Paris	
1994–1996, 1997	Gargoyles	Demona, additional Voices	Voice, recurring role
1996	Gadgetman	Detective Inspector Walker	Television film
1997	Duckman	Aurora Abromowitz	Voice, episode: "Where No Duckman Has Gone Before"
1998	Diagnosis: Murder	Mary Ann Eagin	
1999	Earth: Final Conflict	Sister Margarette	
1999	The Outer Limits	Olivia "Liv" Kohler	Episode: "The Grell"
1999–2000	Star Trek: Voyager	Counselor Deanna Troi	3 episodes
2000	Stargate SG-1	Svetlana Markova	Episode: "Watergate"
2001	Casualty	Jane Taylor, MP	
2003	Threat Matrix	Nabila Hassan	
2005, 2009	Family Guy	Marina Sirtis, Herself	Voice
2005	The Closer	Layla Moktari	Episode: "L.A. Woman"
2005	Star Trek: Enterprise	Counselor Deanna Troi	Episode: "These Are the Voyages..."
2006	Without a Trace	Alexas Soros	
2006	Girlfriends	Gina Richards	
2007	Grendel	Queen Onela	Television film
2008	Holby City	Lucy Simmonds	
2009	Annihilation Earth	Paxton	Television film
2009	The Cleveland Show	Athena the Greek Prostitute / Woman At Party	Voice, episode: "Ladies' Night"
2009	Green Street 2	Veronica Mavis	
2009	Three Rivers	Layla Rahimi	
2010	Make It or Break It	Anna Kleister	
2010–2019	Young Justice	Queen Bee / L-4, Sandra Stanyon	Voice, recurring role
2011	Grey's Anatomy	Sonya Amin	Episode "This is How We Do It"
2013	Star Trek Continues	Computer Voice	
2013	Adventure Time	Samantha	Voice, episode: "The Pit"
2013–2016	NCIS	Mossad Director Orli Elbaz	3 episodes
2016	My Summer Prince	Penelope Sheridan	Television film
2017	Scandal	General Fletcher	Episode: "The Box"
2017	OK K.O.! Let's Be Heroes	Cosma	Voice, recurring role
2018	The Last Sharknado: It's About Time	Winter	
2018	Titans	Marie Granger	Episode: "Hank and Dawn"
2019	The Orville	Schoolteacher	Episode: "Sanctuary"
2020–2023	Star Trek: Picard	Commander Deanna Troi	7 episodes
2020	Star Trek: Lower Decks	Commander Deanna Troi	Voice, episode: "No Small Parts"
2023	Love’s Greek To Me	Athena	Television film

=== Video games ===
Year	Title	Voice role	Note
1995	Star Trek: The Next Generation – A Final Unity	Counselor Deanna Troi	
2007	Mass Effect	Matriarch Benezia	
2014	Elite Dangerous	COVAS Carina	
2015	Family Guy: The Quest for Stuff	Counselor Deanna Troi	Voice
2017	XCOM 2: War of the Chosen	Elena Dragunova	Voice

=== Audiobooks ===
Year	Title	Role
2015	Rain of the Ghosts	Julia

== Awards and honours ==
- 2024 – Saturn Awards – Lifetime Achievement Award – The Cast of Star Trek: The Next Generation (Note: "The Lifetime Achievement Award is usually presented to an individual for their contributions to genre entertainment. Top luminaries like Stan Lee and Leonard Nimoy, Mr. Spock himself, have received this top honor. It's not new, but we extended this award to cover the entire cast of Star Trek: The Next Generation, due to its continued influence on the face of general television. It was originally doomed to failure since it was following in the footsteps of the original Star Trek, yet it carved its own identity, and its diverse cast was light years ahead of its time!" —Academy of Science Fiction, Fantasy and Horror Films)
