= Thom Adcox-Hernandez =

American voice actor

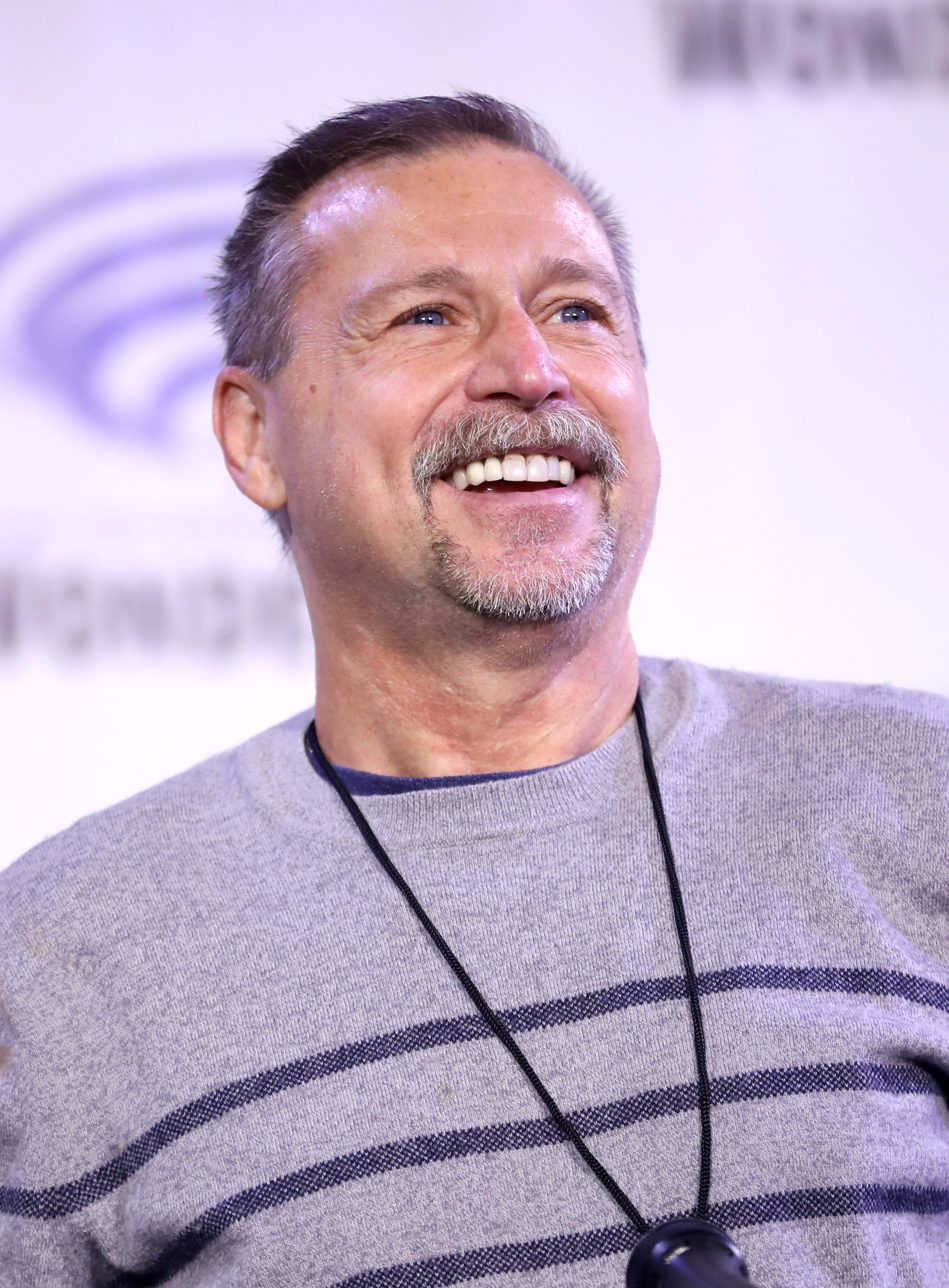
- Adcox-Hernandez at the 2024 WonderCon
- Born: Detroit, Michigan, U.S.
- Occupation: Actor
- Years active: 1988–present

Thom Adcox-Hernandez is an American actor, known for his roles as Brian in the prime-time soap opera Falcon Crest and the voices of Felix the Cat in the first season of The Twisted Tales of Felix the Cat, Lexington on Gargoyles and Klarion the Witch Boy on Young Justice.

== Life and career ==
Adcox-Hernandez starred as Lexington in the Disney animated series Gargoyles, and Pupert in The Buzz on Maggie. He also voiced Phineas Mason/Tinkerer and Klarion the Witch Boy in The Spectacular Spider-Man and Young Justice, both produced by Gargoyles creator Greg Weisman.

He is gay.

== Filmography ==
=== Film ===
Year	Title	Role	Notes
1988	Lethal Pursuit	Mikey	
1988	I Saw What You Did and I Know Who You Are!	Boy	Television film
1988	Liberace	Darin	Television film
1988	The Absent-Minded Professor	Student	Television film
1990	My Life as a Babysitter	Auggie Berger	Television film
1991	Popcorn	Corky	
1991	Ghoulies III: Ghoulies Go to College	Pixel	Voice
1991	For the Boys	Wounded Marine, Korea	
1992	Interceptor	Briggs	
1995	Gargoyles: The Heroes Awaken	Lexington	Voice
1995	Under Siege 2: Dark Territory	Technician No. 2	
1996	It Came from Outer Space II	Hughy	Television film
1996	Entertaining Angels: The Dorothy Day Story	Dan Irwin	
1999	Final Voyage	Abe	
2000	Tom Sawyer	Deputy Bean	Voice
2006	Hot Chicks	Demon	
2008	Scooby-Doo! and the Goblin King	Sparkplug	Voice, direct-to-video
2009	Tinker Bell and the Lost Treasure	Flint	Voice, credited as Thom Adcox
2019	Wonder Park	Additional voices	Voice

=== Television ===
Year	Title	Role	Notes
1989	Falcon Crest	Brian	Recurring role (15 episodes)
1989	Doctor Doctor	Oscar	Episode: "Patients Are a Virtue"
1989	Family Matters	Roger	Episode: "False Arrest"
1991	3×3 Eyes	Monkey	Voice, English dub
1992	Homefront	Wounded Soldier	Episode: "First Sign of Spring"
1994	Gargoyles	Lexington, Brentwood	Voice, main role
1995	The Twisted Tales of Felix the Cat	Felix the Cat	Voice, main role (season 1)
1997	101 Dalmatians: The Series	Dipstick	Voice, recurring role (6 episodes)
1998	Nazca	Shinri Shiogami/Jigami	Voice, recurring role (12 episodes)
1998	Invasion America	Simon Lear	Voice, recurring role (13 episodes)
2003; 2007	All Grown Up!	Mr. Marsh, Additional Voices	(2 episodes)
2004	Jakers! The Adventures of Piggley Winks	Fergal O'Hopper	Voice, recurring role (2 episodes)
2005	The Buzz on Maggie	Pupert	Voice, main role (21 episodes)
2005	The Grim Adventures of Billy & Mandy	Billy's Nose	Voice, episode: "Wild Parts"
2006	W.I.T.C.H.	Sammy	Voice, episode: "C is for Changes"
2006	Higglytown Heroes	Higglyhune	Voice, episode: "Higgly Island"
2009	The Spectacular Spider-Man	Phineas Mason / Tinkerer, Homunculi	Voice, recurring role (4 episodes)
2011–12; 2019–22	Young Justice	Klarion the Witch Boy	Voice, recurring role (11 episodes)
2014	Breadwinners	Mr. Flutterby	Voice, episode: "Pizzawinners"
2015	Sofia the First	Milo	Voice, episode: "Stormy Lani"

=== Video games ===
Year	Title	Role	Notes
1997	Popeye and the Quest for the Wooly Mammoth	Woolly	
2013	Young Justice: Legacy	Klarion the Witch Boy	
2017	Final Fantasy XV	Additional voices	Comrades DLC
2018	Lego DC Super-Villains	Klarion the Witch Boy	

=== Audio books ===
Year	Title	Role
2015	Rain of the Ghosts	Lance Pedros, Miller
