= Madhumala Chattopadhyay =

Indian anthropologist

- Born: 16 March 1961 (age 65); Shibpur, Kolkata, India
- Education: University of Calcutta
- Employer: Ministry of Social Justice and Empowerment
- Known for: Anthropologist

Madhumala Chattopadhyay (born 16 March 1961) is an Indian anthropologist who specializes in the Indigenous peoples of the Andaman and Nicobar Islands. In 1991, Chattopadhyay and her colleagues were the second outsiders to make peaceful contact with the Sentinelese people.

== Early life and education ==
Chattopadhyay was brought up in Shibpur, a small suburb in Kolkata, West Bengal. Her father was an accounts officer with the South Eastern Railway. Her mother was Pronoti Chattopadhyay. She first became interested in the Indigenous peoples of the Andaman Islands when she was twelve years old.

She graduated from Bhabani Balika Vidyalaya in Shibpur. Afterward, she obtained her Bachelor of Sciences (with honors) in Anthropology from the University of Calcutta. She wrote a dissertation, Genetic Study among the Aborigines of the Andaman. She applied for a PhD fellowship with the Anthropological Survey of India (AnSI) in order to do field research with the tribes of the Andaman Islands. Chattopadhyay obtained her PhD on the tribes of the Andamans. AnSI was reluctant to grant her a fellowship because she was female, and they worried she would not be safe while doing field work with potentially hostile tribes. However, they granted the fellowship in light of her academic record.

== Field work ==
Before Chattopadhyay was allowed to do field work in the Andaman Islands, the Anthropological Survey of India required her and her parents to sign disclaimers confirming they knew the dangers of work with uncontacted peoples and would not hold the government responsible if Chattopadhyay was injured or killed while doing research. She spent six years researching the various tribes of Andaman and Nicobar islands. She last visited Andamans in 1999.

=== Contact with the Sentinelese ===
On 4 January 1991, Chattopadhyay was part of a team that made the first peaceful contact with the Sentinelese tribe of Andamans. She was also the first female outsider to contact them. Chattopadhyay at that time was a research associate with the Anthropological Survey of India. She went to the North Sentinel Island with the support of local administration's ship MV Tarmugli. She was a part of a team of 13. The key team members were S. Awaradi (Director, Tribal Welfare, A&NI administration), who was the team leader; Arun Mullick, who was the medical officer (for providing medical attention in case of sickness or injury); and Chattopadhyay herself, the team anthropologist. The rest of the team were support crew.

The team initiated contact by approaching the island on a smaller vessel and dropping coconuts into the water as gifts. A few armed men came into the water to collect coconuts. This repeated until the team ran out of coconuts, at which point they returned to the main ship to resupply. The second time, a young man aimed his bow at Chattopadhyay, but a Sentinelese woman made him drop his weapon. Chattopadhyay escaped from this attack and the team retreated. When the team returned for a third time, Chattopadhyay and colleagues jumped into the water near the boat and handed the islanders coconuts in person. One of the crew took photographs of crew members handing coconuts to the islanders, which were widely circulated in the press. Writer Vishvajit Pandya notes that these photographs made the public rethink their mental image of the Sentinelese.

On 21 February of the same year, a larger team came back to another successful contact with the tribe. Some Sentinelese saw them approach and went over, unarmed, to meet the team. The Sentinelese party boarded the AnSI ship and took coconuts. Reflecting on her work with the Sentinelese, Chattopadhyay said, "You feel that you are there to study, but actually, they are the ones who study you. You are foreign in their lands." She also observed, "Never ever in my six years of doing research alone with the tribes of Andamans did any man ever misbehave with me. The tribes might be primitive in their technological achievements, but socially they are far ahead of us."

The Indian government later banned any more expeditions, citing the possibility of the tribe contracting disease due to frequent visits by outsiders.

In an interview with National Geographic decades later, Chattopadhyay discouraged further attempts to contact the Sentinelese. She said, "The tribes have been living on the islands for centuries without any problem. Their troubles started after they came into contact with outsiders...The tribes of the islands do not need outsiders to protect them, what they need is to be left alone." She also argued that the people of the Andaman Islands suffered greatly during the British occupation, and that Indians should not make the same mistake and try to assimilate the Sentinelese into the larger world.

=== Work with the Aong (Jarawa) tribe ===
In 1991, Chattopadhyay was part of a team that contacted the Aong tribe. The Indian government had established friendly contact with Aong people in 1975, but prohibited women from joining contact parties, as visiting women had previously been attacked. Although Chattopadhyay was allowed as a member of the 1991 contact party, she stayed on a small boat while her male teammates went ashore to meet with the islanders. However, Aong women on shore called for Chattopadhyay to come and meet them. Chattopadhyay has some mastery of the Ongan languages, including the Jarawa language, so she was able to understand some of what they said. As she approached shore, five Aong men and one woman climbed aboard. The Aong woman sat next to her, and Chattopadhyay hugged her. More women greeted her when she came ashore.

Over multiple visits, Chattopadhyay developed a bond with some Aong women; she was invited to their homes, given food, invited to play with their children, and given small gifts. She also helped the Aong women with their daily chores. She went on around eight visits to the Aong tribe between 1991 and 1999.

=== Work with the Onge tribe ===
Chattopadhyay was known as Debotobeti, meaning "doctor", to the Onge people when she visited them. She checked their health and took blood samples from them as part of her research. New Zealand anthropologist Sita Venkateswar, who also worked with the people of the Andaman Islands, stated that Chattopadyay often positioned herself as a medic during field work, both with the Onge and with the Aong/Jarakawa. Venkateswar wrote, "Chattopadhyay...assigned for herself a kind of Florence Nightingale role during the 'contact.'" Chattopadhyay speaks Onge.

=== Work on Car Nicobar ===
Chattopadhyay has also worked with two Indigenous groups on the island of Car Nicobar, the Shompen and the Nicobarese. Her book Tribes of Car Nicobar and journal papers are used as standard reference texts in universities worldwide.

== Later career ==
As of 2015, Madhumala Chattopadhyay works for India's Ministry of Social Justice and Empowerment and lives in New Delhi. She has a desk job which does not involve field work.

After an American missionary illegally visited North Sentinel Island and was killed by its inhabitants, Chattopadhyay told reporters that she disapproved of his actions. "The Sentinelese and other tribes don’t need to be oppressed with religion, because doing so will make them more hostile," she said in 2018.
