= Last Days (2025 film) =

Film by Justin Lin

- Theatrical release poster
- Directed by: Justin Lin
- Screenplay by: Ben Ripley
- Based on: "The Last Days of John Allen Chau" by Alex Perry
- Produced by: Justin Lin; Clayton Townsend; Ellen Goldsmith-Vein; Eric Robinson; Salvador Gatdula; Andrew Schneider
- Starring: Sky Yang; Radhika Apte; Ken Leung; Toby Wallace; Naveen Andrews
- Cinematography: Oliver Bokelberg
- Edited by: Dylan Highsmith
- Music by: Nathan Alexander
- Production companies: Perfect Storm Entertainment; Gotham Group; 40 Degrees
- Distributed by: Vertical
- Release dates: January 28, 2025 (Sundance); October 24, 2025 (United States)
- Running time: 120 minutes
- Country: United States
- Language: English
- Box office: $219,915

Last Days is a 2025 American biographical drama film about John Allen Chau, a Christian missionary who was killed while attempting to evangelize the self-isolated Sentinelese people. It is directed by Justin Lin, with screenwriter Ben Ripley adapting the Outside magazine article "The Last Days of John Allen Chau" by Alex Perry. It premiered at the 2025 Sundance Film Festival. Starring Sky Yang, Radhika Apte, Ken Leung, Toby Wallace, and Naveen Andrews, and was released in the United States on October 24, 2025.

== Plot ==
The film tells the story of John Allen Chau, a missionary who attempted to evangelize to the Sentinelese, an intentionally self-isolated tribe living on North Sentinel Island in the Indian Ocean.

== Cast ==
- Sky Yang as John Allen Chau
- Ken Leung as John's father Patrick Chau
- Claire Price as John's mother Lynda Chau
- Toby Wallace as fellow missionary Chandler
- Ciara Bravo as fellow missionary Kayla
- Radhika Apte as Sub-Inspector Meera Ganali
- Naveen Andrews as Inspector Sonny
- Donné Ngabo (Credited: Dieudonné Ngabo) as Raz
- Ram Gopal Morwal as Underling
- Apinderdeep Singh as Sikh Immigration Officer
- Mridul Das as Indian police officer Ishaan
- Anupam Tiwari as Indian police officer Farid
- Marny Kennedy as John's one-night stand girl Melanie
- Erik Alens as Max

== Production ==
In February 2023, it was announced that Justin Lin would be directing an independent drama film based on the 2019 Outside article "The Last Days of John Allen Chau" by Alex Perry. Ben Ripley would write the screenplay. The project was developed by The Gotham Group. Justin Lin is also a producer, alongside Andrew Schneider, Sal Gatdula, Ellen Goldsmith-Vein, Eric Robinson and Clayton Townsend. Sky Yang was cast in the lead role in June 2023.

In May 2024, Radhika Apte, Naveen Andrews, Ken Leung, Toby Wallace, Ciara Bravo, Claire Price, Dieudonné Ngabo, and Marny Kennedy joined the cast of the film.

Keanu Reeves was an executive producer on the film.

=== Filming ===
Principal photography began on May 17, 2024, in Thailand.

== Release ==
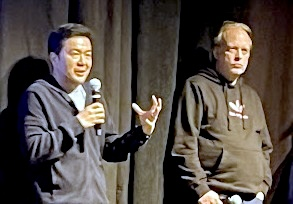
Justin Lin and Oliver Bokelberg (l-r) at a Last Days screening at Sundance 2025

The film premiered at the 2025 Sundance Film Festival on January 28, 2025. In July 2025, Vertical acquired North American rights to the film. The film was released in the United States on October 24, 2025.

== Reception ==
On the review aggregator website Rotten Tomatoes, 32% of 31 critics' reviews are positive, with an average rating of 4.5/10. Metacritic, which uses a weighted average, assigned the film a score of 43 out of 100, based on 11 critics, indicating "mixed or average" reviews.

== See also ==
- The Mission (2023 film)
