= Flatliners (2017 film) =

2017 film by Niels Arden Oplev

- Theatrical release poster
- Directed by: Niels Arden Oplev
- Screenplay by: Ben Ripley
- Story by: Peter Filardi
- Based on: Flatliners by Peter Filardi
- Produced by: Laurence Mark; Michael Douglas; Peter Safran
- Starring: Elliot Page (Note: Credited as Ellen Page.); Diego Luna; Nina Dobrev; James Norton; Kiersey Clemons; Kiefer Sutherland
- Cinematography: Eric Kress
- Edited by: Tom Elkins
- Music by: Nathan Barr
- Production companies: Columbia Pictures; Cross Creek Pictures; Furthur Films; Laurence Mark Productions; The Safran Company
- Distributed by: Sony Pictures Releasing
- Release date: September 29, 2017 (United States)
- Running time: 110 minutes
- Country: United States
- Language: English
- Budget: $19 million
- Box office: $45.2 million

Flatliners is a 2017 American science fiction psychological horror film directed by Niels Arden Oplev and written by Ben Ripley. A stand-alone sequel to and remake of the 1990 film of the same name, it stars Elliot Page, Diego Luna, Nina Dobrev, James Norton, and Kiersey Clemons. The story follows five medical students who attempt to conduct experiments that produce near-death experiences.

The film was released in the United States on September 29, 2017, by Sony Pictures Releasing, and was panned by critics, who generally remarked that it repeated the problems of the original in failing to do justice to its interesting premise.

== Plot ==
Courtney is a medical student who is obsessed with the afterlife. She invites her classmates, Jamie and Sophia, to join her in an experiment, in an unused hospital room: using defibrillation to stop her heart for sixty seconds while recording her brain. She assures them they would not be held responsible for any accidents. Sophia is against this, but Jamie does it anyway. After sixty seconds, they are unable to revive her until a fellow student, Ray, steps in to help. Marlo, another medical student, arrives and learns of the experiment.

Courtney begins to recall experiences about increased intelligence and euphoria. Envious, Jamie flatlines, and has a disturbing near-death experience as he meets his ex-girlfriend. Marlo and Sophia follow suit, increasing the duration of time they are down. During Sophia's turn they are nearly caught and flee the hospital.

The visions experienced by those who flatlined are: Courtney sees her sister Tessa, who died in a car crash Courtney caused; Jamie sees the baby he begged his ex-girlfriend to abort; Marlo sees a patient named Cyrus, who died when she accidentally mixed up his medication; and Sophia sees Irina, whose life she ruined out of spite, allowing Sophia to become valedictorian. Everyone keeps their visions to their individual selves.

Courtney, traumatized by her visions, records a message apologizing and admitting that her interest in flatlining was due to the death of her sister, not for scientific discovery. She dies having been pushed off a fire escape by the ghost of her sister. The others are devastated. They think they may be implicated if their experiments are discovered. They attempt to clean Courtney's apartment of all evidence. Marlo goes to the morgue to find Courtney's phone, where she is disturbed by more visions.

On his boat, Jamie again hears the cries of a baby and a woman weeping. He falls out of his boat and swims to the dock where a figure stabs his hand.

Courtney's recording discloses they all had similar visions. They admit the mistakes they made and come to the conclusion that their haunting experiences are hallucinations owing to guilt from their sins, not the paranormal. The only one who did not flatline, Ray, initially disbelieves what is happening.

Sophia's apology to Irina is accepted. Jamie discovers his ex-girlfriend has kept their baby and pledges to provide for his son. Ray and Marlo get into a fight when he uncovers her attempt at hiding Cyrus' cause of death and she refuses to confess. Marlo hallucinates being suffocated while driving and crashes her car. Tired of being haunted by her hallucinations, Marlo flatlines on her own in the hope of asking Cyrus for forgiveness. She sees Courtney, who tells Marlo that she needs to forgive herself. Ray, Sophia and Jamie arrive to resuscitate Marlo.

Marlo confesses to the Dean and is held on probation. Marlo, Ray, Sophia and Jamie meet to reminisce about Courtney.

== Cast ==
- Nina Dobrev as Marlo
- Elliot Page as Courtney Holmes
- Diego Luna as Ray
- James Norton as Jamie
- Kiersey Clemons as Sophia Manning
- Kiefer Sutherland as Dr. Barry Wolfson / Nelson Wright (Note: A deleted scene identifies Wolfson as being an older version of Dr. Nelson Wright from the original film, having changed his name.)
- Beau Mirchoff as Brad
- Madison Brydges as Tessa Holmes
- Miguel Anthony as Cyrus Gudgeon
- Jenny Raven as Irina Wong
- Charlotte McKinney as Olivia
- Wendy Raquel Robinson as Mrs. Jean Manning
- Steve Byers as Marlo's Brother
- Janet Porter as Doctor Rose
- Jeremiah Sird as Dr. Velez

== Production ==
In 2008, Michael Douglas and Stephen Susco attempted to reboot Flatliners, as a television series. Douglas would produce the series while Susco would handle writing duties. Development would officially shift from a TV series to a feature film in August 2011; Source Code writer Ben Ripley was attached as screenwriter and Laurence Mark would co-produce with Douglas. By February 2013, Niels Arden Oplev was slated to direct.

Oplev aimed to have a more diverse cast than its 1990 counterpart. In October 2015, Elliot Page was cast in the film. In February 2016, Diego Luna was added, with Nina Dobrev joining in April. In May 2016, Kiersey Clemons and James Norton signed on for the film.

In July 2016, it was announced that Kiefer Sutherland, who starred in the original, would return in the new film. Sutherland later disclosed that he was reprising his role from the original film, adding that the new film is actually a sequel rather than a remake. Despite the announcement, Sutherland played a character with a different name than in the original, with no reference to the specific events of the previous film. In July 2016, Charlotte McKinney also joined the cast.

Principal photography began in early July 2016 in Toronto, Ontario primarily at Cinespace Film Studios' Kipling Avenue facility, and concluded on September 7. The film went into post-production on October 4. Additional photography began in Toronto on July 24 and wrapped on August 1, 2017.

In his memoir Pageboy, Page described an unsafe and toxic work environment on set. During the filming of a car stunt involving Page and Kiersey Clemons, neither were allegedly given any restraints and had their concerns dismissed by the stunt coordinators. Page also detailed instances of racism toward Clemons by a crew member, and queerphobia towards himself, notably from an unnamed head of production.

Nathan Barr composed the film score. The soundtrack was released by Sony Classical.

== Release ==
Flatliners was released by Sony Pictures Releasing on September 29, 2017. In July 2016, it was announced that the film would be released on August 18, 2017. However, in November 2016, it was announced that the film would be pushed back a month from its original date of August 18, 2017, to September 29, 2017.

=== Home media ===
Flatliners was released on Digital HD on December 12, 2017, and on Blu-ray and DVD on December 19, 2017, in Canada, and on December 26, 2017, in the United States.

== Reception ==
=== Box office ===
Flatliners grossed $16.9 million in the United States and Canada, and $28.1 million in other territories, for a worldwide total of $45.2 million, against a production budget of $19 million.

In North America, the film was released alongside American Made and 'Til Death Do Us Part, as well as the wide expansion of Battle of the Sexes, and was projected to gross $8–12 million from 2,552 theaters in its opening weekend. It ended up debuting to $6.6 million, finishing 5th at the box office; even before factoring in inflation, the number was lower than the $10 million opening of the original film in 1990. In its second weekend the film dropped 42%, grossing $3.6 million.

=== Critical response ===
On the review aggregator website Rotten Tomatoes, 4% of 76 critics' reviews are positive, with an average rating of 3.6/10. The website's consensus reads: "Flatliners falls flat as a horror movie and fails to improve upon its source material, rendering this reboot dead on arrival." Metacritic, which uses a weighted average, assigned the film a score of 27 out of 100, based on 20 critics, indicating "generally unfavorable" reviews. Audiences polled by CinemaScore gave the film an average grade of "B−" on an A+ to F scale, while PostTrak reported filmgoers gave it a 66% overall positive score and a 46% "definite recommend".

Criticizing the repetitiveness of the scenes and lack of tension, Peter Travers of Rolling Stone called the film "even more witless and stupefyingly dull than the original." He gave it one star. Ryan Porter gave it one-and-a-half stars in The Star, saying that like the original, it takes a solid premise and fails to develop it in an interesting or exciting way. He said the film's one positive is the unintentional humor which results from the stupidity of several scenes and the earnestness with which the actors approach them. Matt Zoller Seitz similarly said that "[the] premise [of the original Flatliners], which could have opened the door to a visionary work of sci-fi horror, settled into a sort of gothic self-help drama groove, with the medical students realizing that the seemingly supernatural goings-on triggered by their experiments in 'flatlining' were manifestations of their past misdeeds. Director Niels Arden Oplev's remake ... sticks to that template, changing key details here and there while embracing a style that stirs every current horror movie visual cliche into a jagged paste." He also remarked that the obvious effort given by the entire cast could not overcome the contrived and clichéd scares and melodrama. Both Travers and Porter derided the visual effect of the afterlife scenes as cheap-looking and silly.

== See also ==
- A Thousand Deaths
