= Touchdown (2024 film) =

- Directed by: Josephine Rose
- Written by: Josephine Rose
- Cinematography: Gerry Vasbenter
- Edited by: Nicola Matiwone
- Music by: David Long
- Production company: Bandit Country
- Distributed by: AMP International
- Release date: 24 August 2024 (FrightFest)
- Running time: 78 minutes
- Country: United Kingdom
- Language: English

Touchdown is a 2024 British science fiction film directed by Josephine Rose in her feature directorial debut. It premiered at the 2024 FrightFest.

== Premise ==
Set in an alternate 2024, the film follows the perspective young London blogger Jamie (Clinton Liberty) and his online group of international friends as strange creatures land on Earth.

== Cast ==
- Clinton Liberty as Jamie
- Cressida Bonas as Emma
- Kai Luke Brümmer as Pete
- Will Attenborough as Jerry
- Lily Frazer as Chloe
- Jason Flemyng as Professor Steven Landers
- Sky Yang as Wang Li

== Production ==
Josephine Rose directed, wrote, and produced the film, with Gerry Vasbenter as director of photography and Nicola Matiwone as editor.

Principal photography took place remotely during the COVID-19 lockdown in seven countries, including the UK, South Africa, Hong Kong, Thailand, and Australia. The film utilised the nature of the restrictions and social isolation in its storytelling.

== Release ==
In May 2024, AMP International acquired the world sales rights to the film. Touchdown had its world premiere at the 2024 FrightFest.
