= The Mission (2023 film) =

- Theatrical release poster
- Directed by: Amanda McBaine; Jesse Moss
- Produced by: Amanda McBaine; Jesse Moss; Simon Chinn; Jonathan Chinn; Will Cohen
- Cinematography: Thorsten Thielow
- Edited by: Aaron Wickenden
- Music by: Danny Bensi; Saunder Jurriaans
- Production companies: National Geographic Documentary Films; Lightbox; Mile End Films
- Distributed by: Picturehouse
- Release dates: August 31, 2023 (Telluride); October 13, 2023 (United States)
- Running time: 103 minutes
- Country: United States
- Language: English
- Box office: $58,639

The Mission is a 2023 American documentary film directed and produced by Amanda McBaine and Jesse Moss. It explores the death of American missionary John Allen Chau, who was killed by arrows during a self-initiated mission involving an indigenous group of the Andaman Islands, the Sentinelese.

It had its world premiere at the 50th Telluride Film Festival on August 31, 2023, and was released on October 13, 2023, by Picturehouse.

== Plot ==
In 2018, Chau, an American missionary, went to the Andaman and Nicobar Islands, in an attempt of making contact with one of the world's most isolated indigenous peoples, the legally protected Sentinelese. After bribing fishermen to take him to North Sentinel Island, Chau was killed by the Sentinelese. The film explores his life and death. Levi Davis, a fellow student of Chau's, historian Adam Goodheart, professor and former missionary Daniel Everett, and anthropologist Triloknath Pandit appear in the film.

== Release ==
It had its world premiere at the 50th Telluride Film Festival on August 31, 2023. It also screened at the Camden International Film Festival on September 15, 2023. and the BFI London Film Festival on October 8, 2023. It was released on October 13, 2023, by Picturehouse.

== Reception ==
On the review aggregator website Rotten Tomatoes, 94% of 52 critics' reviews are positive, with an average rating of 7.4/10. The website's consensus reads: "The Mission's compassionate and nuanced approach to retelling a real-life tragedy makes this an engrossing exploration of the intersection between delusion and faith." Metacritic, which uses a weighted average, assigned the film a score of 74 out of 100, based on 12 critics, indicating "generally favorable" reviews.

== See also ==
- Last Days (2025 film)
