= Clinton Liberty =

Irish actor

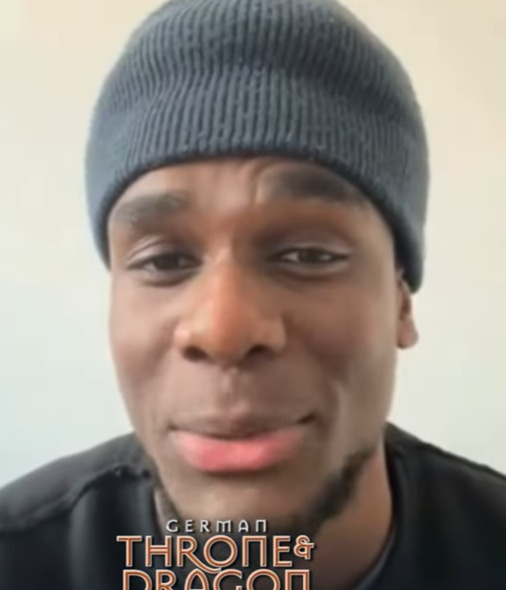
- Liberty at German Throne & Dragon Con 2025
- Education: The Lir Academy (BA)
- Years active: 2019–present

Clinton Liberty is an Irish actor and dancer. On television, he is known for his roles in the ITV miniseries Holding (2022) and the HBO series House of the Dragon (2024–present). His films include Touchdown (2024).

== Early life ==
Liberty grew up in Laytown, County Meath. He is of Jamaican and Nigerian descent. Liberty attended Scoil an Spioraid Naoimh and then Coláiste na hInse in Bettystown. He was a member of the dance club Fit Kids/Fit Teens and danced competitively. He went on to graduate with a Bachelor of Arts in Acting from The Lir Academy at Trinity College Dublin in 2019.

== Career ==
With his background in dance, Liberty made his onscreen debut as a dancer in the 2016 coming-of-age film Handsome Devil. On stage, he starred in the 2019 productions of Shakespeare's Much Ado About Nothing with Rough Magic and The Anvil in Manchester, England. He then landed a recurring role as Connell's school friend Kiernan in the miniseries Normal People, an adaptation of the novel of the same name by Sally Rooney.

The following year, Liberty joined the main cast of the Viaplay spy thriller Red Election as Marcus and made a guest appearance in the RTÉ One series Smother. In 2022, he starred as Linus Dunne alongside Conleth Hill in the ITV adaptation of Graham Norton's debut novel Holding and appeared in the Sky Cinema film This is Christmas.

In April 2023, it was rumoured Liberty had joined the cast of the HBO fantasy series House of the Dragon for its second season in an undisclosed role, later confirmed to be Addam of Hull.

Liberty starred in the 2026 vampire horror film Feed alongside Daisy Jelley. As of November 2024, the film had begun production.

== Filmography ==
=== Film ===
Year	Title	Role	Notes
2016	Handsome Devil	Dancer	
2019	Power Out	Will	Short film
2019	Something Doesn't Feel Right	Jock	Short film
2019	Twin	Partygoer	Short film
2022	This Is Christmas	Michael	Sky Cinema
2024	Touchdown	Jamie	
2026	Feed	Lorcan	

=== Television ===
Year	Title	Role	Notes
2019	Forever in My Heart	Peter	Television film
2020	Normal People	Kiernan	5 episodes
2021	Smother	Max	1 episode
2021	Red Election	Marcus	Main role
2022	Holding	Linus Dunne	Main role
2024–present	House of the Dragon	Addam of Hull	Main role; 10 episodes

== Stage ==
Year	Title	Role	Notes
2019	Much Ado About Nothing		Rough Magic; The Quad, Kilkenny / Theatre Royal Waterford
2019	The Anvil	Edmund	Anu Productions, Manchester
