= Grizzly Night =

- Theatrical release poster
- Directed by: Burke Doeren
- Screenplay by: Katrina Mathewson; Tanner Bean
- Story by: Bo Bean; Katrina Mathewson; Tanner Bean
- Based on: Night of the Grizzlies by Jack Olsen
- Produced by: Lauren Call; Burke Doeren; Kellie Doeren
- Starring: Brec Bassinger; Jack Griffo; Charles Esten; Oded Fehr; Joel Johnstone; Josh Zuckerman; Matt Lintz; Ali Skovbye
- Cinematography: Brian Mitchell; Ian Start
- Edited by: Michael DeJohn
- Music by: Dan Reckard
- Production companies: FourJFilms; Grizzly Night LLC
- Distributed by: Saban Films
- Release date: January 30, 2026
- Running time: 87 minutes
- Country: United States
- Language: English

Grizzly Night is a 2026 American survival thriller film directed by Burke Doeren in his feature directorial debut. The screenplay was written by Katrina Mathewson and Tanner Bean, based on a story by them and Bo Bean. The film is a dramatization of the 1967 "Night of the Grizzlies" attacks in Glacier National Park. It stars Brec Bassinger, Jack Griffo, Charles Esten, and Oded Fehr.

The film depicts the events of August 12, 1967, when two separate fatal grizzly bear attacks occurred on the same night, miles apart, changing the national perception of wildlife conservation. Grizzly Night was released in the United States on January 30, 2026, by Saban Films.

== Plot ==
A woman, Mrs. Berry, arrives at a ranger station and informs Ranger Joan Devereaux that a bear has been repeatedly attacking park visitors, including a recent encounter with a group of Girl Scouts. Despite Joan noting that the issue has been reported multiple times, Ranger Chief Gary Bunney prioritizes dispatching rescue teams to 21 active smoke sightings caused by recent lightning strikes. Gary assigns Ranger Leonard Landa to the McDonald ranger station and tasks Joan with guiding a camping group.

Elsewhere, Paul Dunn, Julie Helgeson, and Michelle Koons discuss their camping plans. Julie declines Michelle's invitation, opting to camp with her boyfriend, Roy Ducat, while Michelle persuades Paul to join her group. Later, Joan leads her hiking group into the park, confirming rumors of a local bear to the campers despite never having seen it herself. Roy and Julie hitchhike further up the mountain, while Michelle, Paul, Ray Noseck, Denise Huckle, and Ray’s brother and Denise’s boyfriend Ron hike to their destination, accompanied by Denise’s dog, Squirt.

Joan's group, along with Roy and Julie, arrives at a heavily booked farmhouse lodge, Granite Park Chalet, managed by Tom Walton and his wife. With no rooms available, several visitors, including another couple named Robert and Janet Klein, are turned away. When questioned about the bear threat, Tom responds dismissively. Because the lodge's incinerator can only process 10 garbage bags per day, excess trash is left outside, attracting bears that the tourists carelessly treat as a photo opportunity. Due to the lack of accommodations, the Kleins and a young man named Don Gullet decide to sleep under the partially-built structure of a cabin, while Roy and Julie set up camp outdoors nearby. Joan confronts Tom about the severe danger of the bears feeding on the garbage, but Tom insists that while park management is fully aware of their waste disposal limitations, a large incinerator is not one of their top priorities at the present.

At a separate location, Michelle remains at the campsite to tend to the dog while the rest of her group goes fishing. Later that evening, a grizzly bear interrupts the group as they cook their catch, forcing them to scramble to higher ground. The bear consumes their food and ransacks the campsite. Despite Paul's urging to hike to the ranger camp, the group refuses due to the distance and impending darkness. However, later that night, the same bear attacks their campsite, dragging a screaming Michelle in her sleeping bag up the hillside and into the woods while the others escape.

During the night near the chalet, Dr. Lundberg and his wife are awakened by screams. A bloodied Roy stumbles toward the trail-crew cabin, waking the campers sleeping outside. He reveals that a grizzly bear attacked him and dragged Julie into the woods. The campers signal the chalet for help, waking Joan and the guests. A rescue party, armed with torches to deter the bears and accompanied by Dr. Lundberg, reaches Roy. A guilt-ridden Roy begs them to search for Julie. Dr. Lundberg treats Roy's severe injuries while Joan radios headquarters, reporting the attack and requesting medical supplies and backup. Father Connelly volunteers to search for Julie, but Joan strictly forbids it, citing the danger of navigating the dark woods without weapons.

The group evacuates Roy via stretcher back to the chalet. Chief Gary Bunney arrives in a helicopter, and Joan's group lights a signal fire to help him land safely in the dark. Gary delivers medical supplies to Dr. Lundberg, who stabilizes Roy but stresses the need for an immediate hospital transfer due to severe blood loss. Gary and his armed team then track pools of blood into the woods and discover a critically injured Julie. They transport her back to the chalet. Joan feels immensely guilty for the delay, but Gary reassures her that preventing an immediate, unorganized search in the dark saved other lives.

Julie's injuries—including severely damaged veins and punctured lungs—prove fatal. Dr. Lundberg notes that even a fully equipped hospital would struggle to save her. Following last rites from Father Connelly, Julie succumbs to her injuries and dies. Her body is evacuated via helicopter.

The following morning, Michelle's group descends from the rocks and discovers Michelle is missing. They hike to the McDonald ranger station to report her disappearance. The ranger on duty, initially believing they are referring to Julie and Roy's incident, doubts a bear could orchestrate two separate attacks in a single night. Once convinced, he alerts headquarters of the second fatal attack. Paul, grieving after learning of Julie's death, joins the rangers to search the campsite, where they discover the remains of Michelle's partially eaten body.

In the aftermath, Joan evacuates her tour group via van to leave the park. A remorseful Tom aggressively burns the remaining garbage at the chalet, vowing to destroy it all and persuade park management to get them a bigger incinerator. As reports of further bear activity emerge, park authorities issue a lethal mandate. Due to staffing shortages, Leonard is drafted into the armed ranger teams, who successfully track down and euthanize the responsible bears.

An epilogue reveals that the film is based on true events, including the killings of four adult grizzlies in the aftermath of the attacks, the halting of ceaseless killing of the grizzlies with the introduction of the Endangered Species Act of 1973, and strict policies reinforced at national parks prohibiting the feeding of bears and pack in-pack out policies.

== Cast ==
- Brec Bassinger as Julie Helgeson
- Lauren Call as Park Ranger Joan Devereaux
- Jack Griffo as Raymond Noseck
- Charles Esten as Park Ranger Gary Bunney
- Oded Fehr as Dr. John Lindberg
- Ali Skovbye as Michele Koons
- Joel Johnstone as Father Connolly
- Josh Zuckerman as Robert Klein
- Matt Lintz as Roy Ducat
- Sophia Macy as Denise Huckle
- Michael Vlamis as Park Ranger Leonard Landa
- Sohm Kapila as Ann Lindberg

== Production ==
=== Development ===
The film is based on the true events known as the "Night of the Grizzlies," which resulted in the deaths of Julie Helgeson and Michele Koons and led to a massive overhaul of bear management policies in American national parks. The project was produced by independent production company FourJFilms. It marks the feature film directorial debut of Burke Doeren.

=== Filming ===
Filming took place near Park City, Utah from August 20, 2023 to September 14, 2023. Filming utilized practical locations to recreate the dense forestry and mountainous terrain of 1960s Montana. Cinematographers Brian Mitchell and Ian Start focused on low-light techniques to emulate the claustrophobic atmosphere of the night-time attacks.

== Release ==
Grizzly Night was released on digital and video on demand platforms in the United States on January 30, 2026, by Saban Films. In the United Kingdom and Ireland, the film was acquired by Lightbulb Film Distribution and set for release on February 2, 2026.

== Reception ==
Pre-release reviews praised the film for its tension and historical basis. Future of the Force highlighted the "breathtaking cinematography" and "brutal Grizzly action," noting it as a significant entry in the "creature feature" genre.

On the review aggregator website Rotten Tomatoes, 53% of 17 critics' reviews are positive.

Joe Lipset of Murder Made Fiction Podcast - Bloody Disgusting gave the film positive review and a 2.5/5 rating and wrote: A soft recommend. The intentions are earnest and the bear looks great, but the hair and costuming is questionable and, though based in fact, the decision to divide the narrative between victims means the characters don't pop.

Karina Adelgaard of Heaven of Horror gave the film a rating of 3/5 and she said that: GRIZZLY NIGHT is a survival thriller based on true events that happened in 1967. This is a well-paced and brutal movie with a character-driven story about several tragic...

Nathaniel Muir of AIPT also gave the film a positive review and wrote: That being said, Grizzly Night is an entertaining watch. There are some disgustingly good gore effects following the attacks and the brisk pacing keeps things moving. The grounded approach is surprising, but is perfect for the story being told.

However, Phil Hoad of The Guardian gave the film a negative review and a rating of 2/5, stating that: Doeren clearly has a feel for the bear necessities, but the human interest hardly gets its boots on.
