= Holding (TV series) =

Irish television series

- Genre: Crime drama
- Based on: Holding by Graham Norton
- Written by: Dominic Treadwell-Collins; Karen Cogan
- Directed by: Kathy Burke
- Starring: Conleth Hill; Siobhán McSweeney; Charlene McKenna
- Composer: Murray Gold
- Countries of origin: Ireland; United Kingdom
- Original language: English
- No. of series: 1
- No. of episodes: 4

Production
- Executive producers: Dominic Treadwell-Collins; Graham Norton; Karen Cogan
- Producer: Martina Niland
- Production companies: Happy Prince; Port Pictures

Original release
- Network: ITV
- Release: 14 March – 4 April 2022

Holding is a four-part television series based on the debut novel of the same name by Graham Norton. It premiered on ITV on 14 March 2022 and on Virgin Media More in Ireland on 12 April 2022.

== Premise ==
Easy-going Garda Sergeant PJ Collins leads a peaceful life in the quiet Cork village of Duneen. It is disrupted by the discovery of an adult male skeleton at a building site owned by the Flynn brothers. Due to its location on the former Burke farm and its age, locals speculate that the skeleton is Tommy Burke. He had disappeared in mid-2001, about 20 years earlier. Cork City-based detective Linus Dunne investigates and orders the Burkes' graves opened for DNA sampling. PJ learns that Tommy had abandoned his fiancée Brid at the altar and simultaneously had an affair with Brid's then-best friend, Evelyn Ross. Brid and Evelyn rarely communicate thereafter. Brid married Anthony and they have two children. Evelyn lives with her sisters Abigail and Florence on the neighbouring dairy farm.

Brid begins drinking more heavily and struggles with community scrutiny. Evelyn dates teenager Stephen and works at the pub, while Abigail runs the dairy. Florence prepares to leave Duneen for America with her girlfriend and fellow school teacher, Susan. PJ observes Evelyn and Brid fighting each other, but avoids confronting them. Brid hides away from her family and the villagers. PJ discovers Brid and returns her home. DNA analysis determines that the skeleton is not the Burkes' son.

== Cast ==
=== Main ===
- Conleth Hill as Patrick Joseph ("PJ") Collins
- Siobhán McSweeney as Bríd Riordan
- Charlene McKenna as Evelyn Ross
- Helen Behan as Abigail Ross
- Amy Conroy as Florence Ross
- Pauline McLynn as Eileen O'Driscoll
- Olwen Fouéré as Kitty Harrington
- Clinton Liberty as Linus Dunne
- Gary Shelford as Anthony Riordan
- Eleanor Tiernan as Susan Hickey
- Sky Yang as Stephen Chen
- Brenda Fricker as Lizzie Meaney

=== Supporting ===
- Demi Isaac Oviawe as Aoife Akingbola
- Calum Rea as Cathal Riordan
- Jane Spollen as Carmel Riordan
- Lochlann Ó Mearáin as Cormac Byrne
- Jim O'Donnell as Willy McCarthy
- Pat Kinevane as Martin Flynn
- Anne Kent as Nora Goggin
- Karl Quinn as John Flynn
- Michael Fry as Alan Doddy
- Felix Brown as Tommy Burke
- Norma Sheahan as D.S. Norma Casey
- Graham Norton as Radio DJ (voice)
- Ivet Corvea as Doctor Walshe
- Gary Murphy as Sgt Looney

== Production ==
=== Development ===
It was announced in May 2021 that ITV had commissioned a four-part adaptation of Graham Norton's 2016 novel, Holding. Dominic Treadwell-Collins and Karen Cogan would write the script for ITV's label Happy Prince, with Kathy Burke directing and Martina Niland for Port Pictures.

=== Casting ===
Alongside the commission in May, Conleth Hill was cast as the lead character PJ Collins. It was later announced in July 2021 that Siobhán McSweeney, Charlene McKenna, Helen Behan, Pauline McLynn, and Brenda Fricker would star alongside Hill with Clinton Liberty, Amy Conroy, Olwen Fouéré, Eleanor Tiernan, Gary Shelford, Lochlann Ó Mearáin, Sky Yang, and Demi Isaac Oviawe also having joined the cast.

=== Filming ===
Principal photography took place on location in West Cork with support from Screen Ireland, beginning in July 2021 and wrapping in October. Filming locations included Drimoleague and Castletownshend.
