= Ali Skovbye =

Canadian actress

- Born: May 16, 2002 (age 24); Vancouver, British Columbia, Canada
- Occupation: Actress
- Years active: 2009–present
- Relatives: Tiera Skovbye (sister)

Ali Skovbye is a Canadian actress. She is best known for playing Young Tully in the drama series Firefly Lane and Grace Browning in the supernatural horror film Whistle.

== Early life ==
Skovbye was born in Vancouver, Canada. When she was a child, her sister Tiera was spotted in a park by a talent agent who gave her parents a card. She was also offered one but declined due to low confidence. She eventually decided she wanted to follow in her older sister's footsteps. Amanda Seyfried was a huge inspiration for her growing up.

== Career ==
Early in her career she made one off appearances in the superhero series Smallville and the action series Supernatural. She had a recurring role portraying Becky Stanton in the Hallmark original When Calls the Heart. She played Abigail in all 5 films of the mystery franchise Gourmet Detective starring Dylan Neal and Brooke Burns. She played the lead role of Jeanne Seraphin in the supernatural horror film The Corruption of Divine Providence. Her biggest role so far has been playing Young Tully in the drama series Firefly Lane, the young version of Katherine Heigls lead role. She played Grace Browning of the main roles in the horror film Whistle alongside Dafne Keen and Sophie Nelisse.

== Filmography ==
=== Film ===
Year	Title	Role	Notes
2009	Personal Effects	Beth	
2010	Sikat	Samantha	Short
2010	Prime Meridian	Melissa	Short
2011	While I Breath	Cate	Short
2011	Joy	Molly Parker	
2011	Wishing Well	Girl	
2011	Newborn	Sophie	Short
2013	Forever 16	Kimber	
2013	Rocketship Misfits	Nicole Brandon	
2013	The Goodbye Girl	Wren	Short
2014	One Christmas Eve	Emma Blackemore	
2015-	No Men Beyond This Point	Zinia Jones	
2015-2020	Gourmet Detective	Abigail	All 5 films
2015	One Christmas Wish	Chloe	
2016	Adventures in Babysitting	Samantha	
2017	Campfire Kiss	Lacey	
2017	Secrets of My Stepdaughter	Addy Kent	
2018	Extra-Ordinary Amy	Joanne	
2018	His Perfect Obsession	Abigail Jones	
2019	Breakthrough	Emma	
2020	The Corruption of Divine Providence	Jeanne Seraphin	All 5 films
2021	Imperfect High	Rose	
2024	Gilded Newport Mysteries: Murder at the Breakers	Emma Vanderbilt-Cross	
2024	Private Princess Christmas	Princess Violet Bill	
2025	Whistle	Grace Browning	
2025	Stargazed	Sydney	Short
2026	Grizzly Night	Michele Koons	
2026	The Marshmallow Experiment	Zoey	

=== Television ===
Year	Title	Role	Notes
2010	Smallville	Haley	Episode; Abandoned
2012	Supernatural	Kelly Harper	Episode; Plucky Pennywhistle's Magical Menagerie
2012	Fringe	Lacey Hayes	Episode; Welcome to Westfield
2012	Once Upon a Time	Paige, Grace	2 episodes
2012	The Haunting Hour: The Series	Hanna	Episode; The Weeping Woman
2013	Motive	Luly Caron	Episode; Creeping Tom
2013	Falling Skies	Emily	2 episodes
2017	You Me Her	Marina	3 episodes
2015-2017	When Calls the Heart	Becky Hastings	7 episodes
2016-2018	The Man in the High Castle	Annie Saunders	3 episodes
2021-2023	Firefly Lane	Young Tully	26 episodes
2027	Ginny & Georgia	Rainn	Episode; Episode #4.1
