= Sky Yang =

British actor and filmmaker (born 1999)

- 楊子英
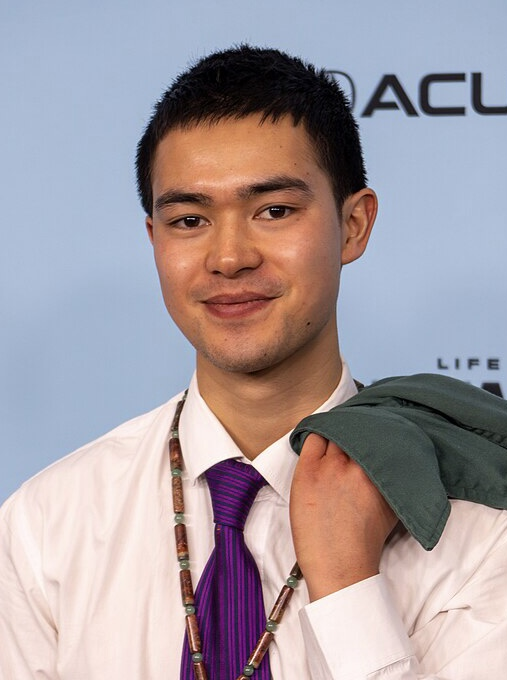
- Yang at the 2025 Sundance Film Festival
- Born: 1999 (age 26–27)
- Education: LAMDA
- Years active: 2010–present

Chinese name
- Simplified Chinese: 杨子英
- Traditional Chinese: 楊子英
Transcriptions
Standard Mandarin
- Hanyu Pinyin: Yáng Zǐyīng

Sky Chi Y. Yang (Chinese: 楊子英; pinyin: Yáng Ziyīng; born 1999) is a British actor and filmmaker. He was named a 2023 Screen International Star of Tomorrow. His films include Last Days and Whistle (both 2025). On television, he is known for his role in the ITV drama Holding (2022).

== Early life ==
Yang was born in South London. He attended Alleyn's School as a member of Roper's. He discovered acting through a school production of Peter Pan and subsequently enrolled in Saturday classes at the Sylvia Young Theatre School, through which he signed with an agent. He later graduated in 2020 from the London Academy of Music and Dramatic Art (LAMDA) with a Bachelor of Arts in Acting. Upon graduating, Yang won the New Earth Theatre's Constellation Creatives bursary.

== Career ==
After signing with an agent, Yang began his career in the ensemble of Madame Butterfly at the Royal Albert Hall. At the age of 17, Yang made his feature film debut with a small role in the Tomb Raider adaptation. Yang created the 2020 short film Sunny with his school friend Ben Bainbridge, based on a poem Yang wrote titled Made In Anger and named after Sun Yat-sen.

Yang featured in The Book of Dust: La Belle Sauvage, a 2021 stage prequel to His Dark Materials performed at the Bridge Theatre. The following year, Yang made his television debut with a main role as Stephen Chen in the ITV crime series Holding. This was followed by a role in the Netflix film Rebel Moon as Imperium soldier Aris, a role Yang would reprise in the sequel.

Yang starred as the titular character of Justin Lin's film Last Days (working title The Last Days of John Allen Chau), which premiered at the 2025 Sundance Film Festival. Also in 2025, Yang returned to the stage in Joel Tan's Scenes from a Repatriation at the Royal Court Theatre, played Rel in the horror film Whistle and Moses Ho in the political thriller film Anniversary, and premiered his second short film Dear Google, which serves as a follow-up to Sunny (2020). Yang has an upcoming role in the films The Uprising and Shoulders.

== Filmography ==
=== Film ===
Year	Title	Role	Notes
2014	No Hopers	Dick	
2018	Tomb Raider	Chinese Kid	
2021	Tuesday	George	Short film
2022	Pragma	Oscar	Short film
2023	Rebel Moon	Aris	Netflix film
2024	Rebel Moon – Part Two: The Scargiver	Aris	Netflix film
2024	Touchdown	Wang Li	
2025	Last Days	John Allen Chau	
2025	Whistle	Rel	
2025	Anniversary	Moses Ho	
2026	The Uprising	The Scribe	
TBA	Shoulders	Teff	
TBA	Tomorrow, and Tomorrow, and Tomorrow	Sam Masur	

=== Filmmaking credits ===
Year	Title	Director	Writer	Other	Notes
2020	Sunny	Yes	Yes	Sunny	Short film
2025	Dear Google	Yes	Yes	Sunny	Short film

=== Television ===
Year	Title	Role	Notes
2022	Holding	Stephen Chen	Miniseries
2022	Halo	Ruben	2 episodes
TBA	The Best of Us		

== Stage ==
Year	Title	Role	Notes
2010	Madame Butterfly	Ensemble	Royal Albert Hall, London
2021	Rescuing One's Sister in the Wind and Dust	Scholar An	Almeida Theatre, London
2021	The Book of Dust: La Belle Sauvage	Andrew / Ben	Bridge Theatre, London
2025	Scenes from a Repatriation		Royal Court Theatre, London
