= South Sentinel Island =

Island in the Andaman Islands

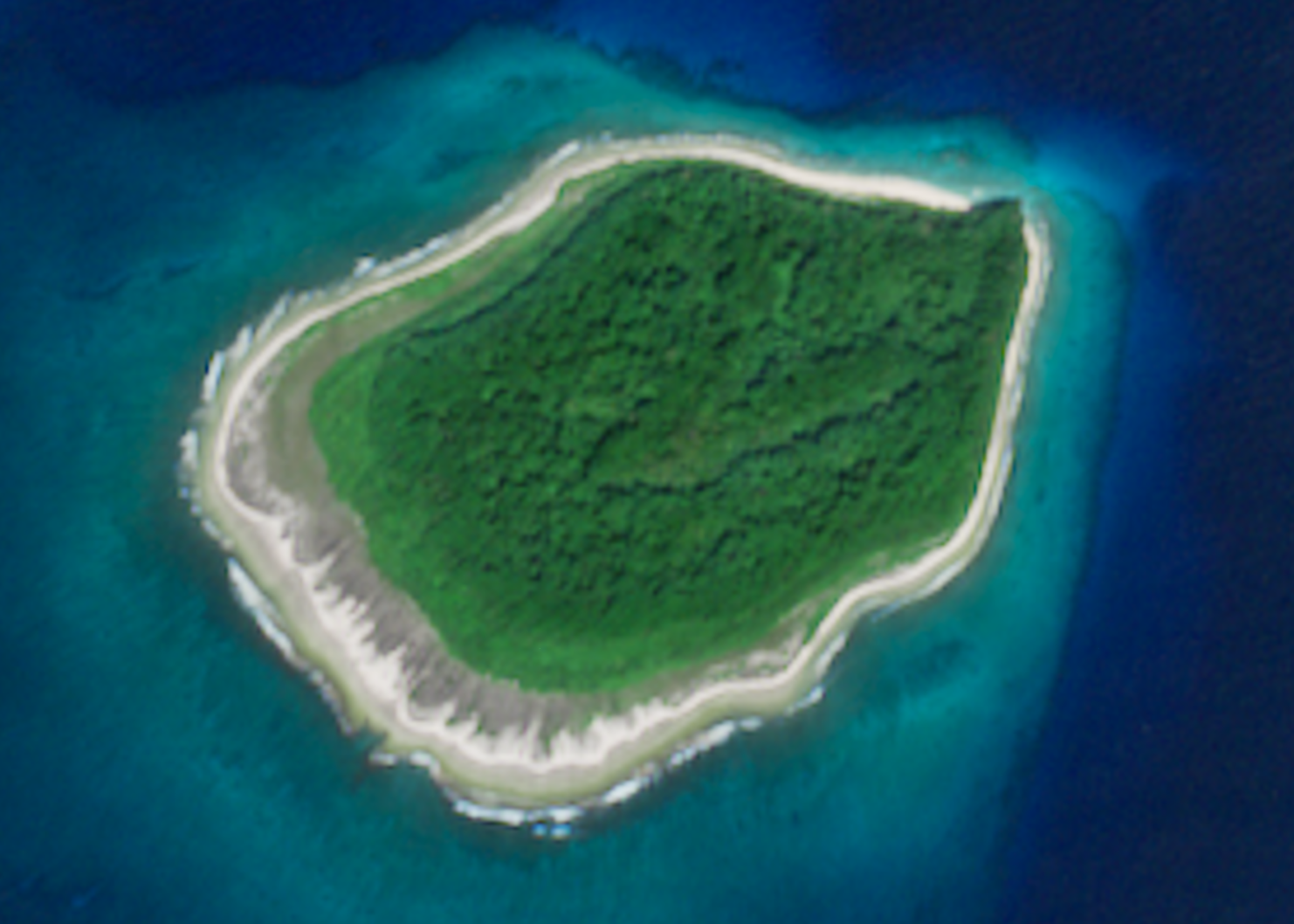
- South Sentinel Island in 2025

- Location within Andaman and Nicobar Islands

Geography
- Location: Bay of Bengal
- Coordinates: 10.976°N 92.22°E
- Archipelago: Andaman Islands
- Adjacent to: Indian Ocean
- Area: 1.61 km^{2} (0.62 sq mi)
- Length: 1.6 km (0.99 mi)
- Width: 1.0 km (0.62 mi)
- Coastline: 4.9 km (3.04 mi)
- Highest elevation: 2 m (7 ft)

Administration
- India
- Union territory: Andaman and Nicobar Islands
- District: South Andaman

Demographics
- Demonym: South Sentinelese
- Population: 0 (2019)

Additional information
- Time zone: IST (UTC+5:30)
- PIN: 744202
- Telephone code: 031927
- ISO code: IN-AN-00
- Official website: andaman.nic.in
- Avg. summer temperature: 30.2 °C (86.4 °F)
- Avg. winter temperature: 23.0 °C (73.4 °F)
- Census Code: 35.639.0004
- Official Languages: Hindi, English

South Sentinel Island is one of the Andaman Islands in the Bay of Bengal. It is 1.6 km (1 mi) long northeast to southwest and up to 1 km (5/8 mi) wide. At only 1.61 km^{2} (5/8 sq mi), it is much smaller than its counterpart North Sentinel Island and is currently uninhabited. The island belongs to the Port Blair tehsil in the South Andaman administrative district, part of the Indian union territory of Andaman and Nicobar Islands, neighbouring North Sentinel Island.

== Geography ==
South Sentinel is 26.5 kilometres (14 1/4 nmi) west-northwest of Little Andaman Island in the south of the Andaman chain but 59.6 kilometres (32 1/4 nmi) south of its counterpart North Sentinel Island. From the limited information available it can be said that South Sentinel Island is a forested coral reef. From a journal written in the 19th century, a Colonel Alcock who passed the island wrote "[South Sentinel is] raised a few feet and continuous with the corals surrounding it". The island lies 186 km (100 1/2 nmi) southwest of Port Blair. It lies immediately south of the passage. The island is 44 m high to the tops of the trees and level topped. Its appearance is much the same on all bearings. A bank, as defined by the 36 m curve, surrounds the island and extends about 11 kilometres (6 nmi) northwest from it. Considerable depths exist in the channel between this island and Little Andaman Island.

== Administration ==
Politically, South Sentinel Island is part of Little Andaman Tehsil.

In 2018, the Government of India excluded 29 islands—including South Sentinel—from the Restricted Area Permit (RAP) regime until 31 December 2022 in an effort to boost tourism. In November 2018, however, the government's Home Ministry stated that the relaxation of the prohibition was intended only to allow researchers and anthropologists, with pre-approved clearance, to visit the Sentinel islands.

== Demographics ==
The island is uninhabited but is sometimes used by diving expeditions on account of its remoteness and novelty factor.

== Fauna ==
The South Sentinel Island Sanctuary (established in 1977) is home to coconut crabs, which have otherwise been extirpated from most of the Andamans aside from North Sentinel and Little Andaman. Huge numbers of pied imperial-pigeon (Ducula bicolor) nest on the island; Every March, thousands of them come from South and Little Andaman to nest on South Sentinel. Small numbers of Nicobar pigeon (Caloenas nicobarica) also nest on the island. One globally threatened bird, the Andaman crake (Rallina canningi) also occurs on the island. It is also a very important nesting habitat for the green sea turtle (Chelonia mydas); large "swarms" of turtles used to be seen in the past, but they have been significantly reduced following extensive poaching by trawlers. Small numbers of leatherback turtles (Dermochelys coriacea) also nest on the island. Two large reptile species are found on the island: the Andaman water monitor (Varanus salvator andamanensis) and the saltwater crocodile (Crocodylus porosus). The Andaman Islands day gecko (Phelsuma andamanensis) is also found on the island. There are no terrestrial mammals on the island aside from the endemic Andaman horseshoe bat (Rhinolophus cognatus).

== See also ==
- List of reefs
