= The Best of Us (TV series) =

American television series

- Genre: Drama
- Created by: Tobias Lindholm; Frank Pugliese
- Written by: Tobias Lindholm; Frank Pugliese
- Directed by: Tobias Lindholm
- Starring: Jeremy Strong; Barry Pepper; Katherine Waterston; Gaby Hoffmann; Neal Huff; Andrea Riseborough; John Slattery; Sky Yang
- Country of origin: United States
- Original language: English

Production
- Executive producers: Tobias Lindholm; Frank Pugliese; Jeremy Strong; Tony Hernandez
- Production companies: Paramount Television Studios; Sister

Original release
- Network: Paramount+

The Best of Us is an upcoming American drama miniseries directed by Tobias Lindholm, written by Lindholm and Frank Pugliese for Paramount+, starring Jeremy Strong.

== Premise ==
The series follows renowned class action lawyer Jason Smith in a legal battle that secured almost $1 billion in compensation for first responders following the September 11 attacks.

== Cast and characters ==
=== Main ===
- Jeremy Strong as Jason Smith
- Barry Pepper as Coach
- Katherine Waterston as Amy Smith
- Gaby Hoffmann as Kathleen McCormick
- Neal Huff as Peter Allen
- Andrea Riseborough as Molly
- John Slattery as James Leavitt
- Sky Yang as The Lost Son

=== Guest ===
- LaChanze
- Richard Schiff
- Elizabeth Rodriguez
- Joe Morton
- Jen Tullock
- William Baldwin
- Keith William Richards

== Production ==
=== Development ===
In December 2021, it was announced Tobias Lindholm would write and direct the series, with Sister set to produce. Frank Pugliese serves as co-writer alongside Lindholm of the series.

In 2024, Skydance Media under its television arm Skydance Television had joined the series as a co-prpducer however a year May 2025, it was announced the series had been placed on hold by Skydance Media amidst the Merger of Skydance Media and Paramount Global. In October 2025 when Skydance Television was merged into Paramount Television Studios & had assume the series, Paramount+ greenlit the series.

=== Casting ===
Upon the initial announcement, Jeremy Strong was set to star in the series. In July 2026, Barry Pepper and Andrea Riseborough joined the cast of the series. In August 2026, Neal Huff, Gaby Hoffmann, Sky Yang and John Slattery joined the cast. In September 2026, LaChanze, Richard Schiff, Elizabeth Rodriguez, Joe Morton, Jen Tullock, William Baldwin and Keith William Richards joined the cast in guest capacity. In October 2026, Katherine Waterston was announced as a cast member.

=== Filming ===
Principal photography commenced in September 2026.

== Release ==
The six-part series is expected to premiere in 2027.
