= Barí people =

Indigenous people in Colombia

Motilón-Barí
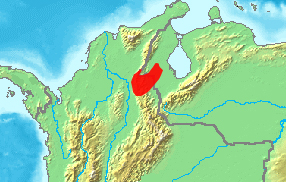
- Motilón-Barí Territory

Total population
- 8,767

Regions with significant populations
- Colombia and Venezuela; Colombia; Venezuela
- Colombia: 5,926
- Venezuela: 2,841

Languages
- Bari, a language in the Chibchan group

Religion
- Catholicism, Animism

Related ethnic groups
- Chibchan group

The Motilones-Barí, sometimes also called Barís, Motilones (or for its singular: Motilón) or Dobocubis, are a group of Indigenous people who live in the Catatumbo River basin in Norte de Santander Department in Colombia in South America and who speak the Barí language. They are descendants of the Tairona culture concentrated in northeastern Colombia and western Venezuela.

== Name ==
Although the Barí and Yukpa peoples are commonly referred to as "Motilones," this is not how they refer to themselves. "Motilones" means "shaved heads" in Spanish, and is how Spanish-speaking Colombians and Venezuelans refer to them.

== History ==
In the 16th century, Alonso de Ojeda of Spain sailed to South Caribbean coasts and reached the Maracaibo Basin. The Spaniards believed that the area's frequent lightning strikes turned stone into gold, and so they began settling the region extensively. The Barí fought the Spaniards back from their territory, defeating five royal expeditions sent to pacify the Indians. It was the Spaniards who first named the Barí "Motilones," or "people of the short hair."

In 1530 Ambrosius Ehinger, commissioned by German banker family (Welser of Augsburg), looted a large amount of gold from the Kalina people on the western coast of South America, and attempted to transport the gold over the Bobalí Mountains. Barí men ambushed and destroyed the expedition, and the gold was lost, never to be found again.

In the 20th century, oil was discovered in Barí territory, and as oil companies moved in, their land has been subjected to oil drilling from 1913 to 1926 and from 1996 to 2001.

The first peaceful contact that was made with the Bari was by Roberto Lizarralde in 1960. Lizarralde conducted research among the Bari for 44 years and his research was carried on by his son, Manuel Lizarralde. The focus of their research has been on the ethnobotany of the Bari, who possess a vast knowledge of the biodiversity in Amazonia and use 80% of the plants around them.

They have been the subject of the French ethnologist Robert Jaulin, and they were among the peoples depicted in the 1921 documentary Blandt Syd-Amerikas urskovsindianere (Among the Primeval Forest Indians of South America).

The missionary Bruce Olson relates in his book, Bruchko, that he began living with the Bari in 1962, and he says that he became the "blood brother" of a chieftain's son. According to Olson, he is part of what he refers to as the "Motilone Miracle", which involves Indigenous-run schools, literacy programs, medical clinics, as well as an effort of the Motilone Bari to introduce Christianity to surrounding tribes.

Since the initial contact in 1650, Bari land has been reduced to 7% of its original mass and the Bari have shifted their production to the gardening of cash crops in order to acquire Western goods which are becoming increasingly integrated into their culture.

== Economy ==
The Barí people's chief economic activity is the growing of Theobroma cacao, the plant from which chocolate is made. They export the cacao and use the proceeds to help maintain their network of schools, community centers, and health clinics, all started after large numbers of the Barí (notably the chieftain, "Bobby") converted to Christianity, which resulted in a significant cultural shift.

== Language ==
The Barí speak the Barí language, part of the Chibchan language family.

== Culture ==
The Barí people practices collective fatherhood, in which a child has multiple fathers. Each father is someone who had sex with the mother before she gave birth, with a cultural belief that all contribute to paternity. One man will often become the "primary" father, while the other lovers will be "secondary" fathers. It is proposed that this would increase survivorship among children.

== Beliefs ==
Current estimates are that 95% of the Barí people are Catholics.

== See also ==
- Bruchko
- Bruce Olson

== Bibliography ==
- Bruchko – updated edition of the 1973 autobiography by Bruce Olson (link points to Amazon.com)
- Bruchko and the Motilone Miracle – 2006 sequel to Bruchko by Bruce Olson and James L. Lund (link points to Amazon.com)
- Bruce Olson: Missionary or American Colonizer? – 1981 book by Andres kung, examining Olson's career (link points to Amazon.com)
- The Jungle is Still His Home – 2007 interview in Charisma magazine
