= Ben Ripley =

American screenwriter

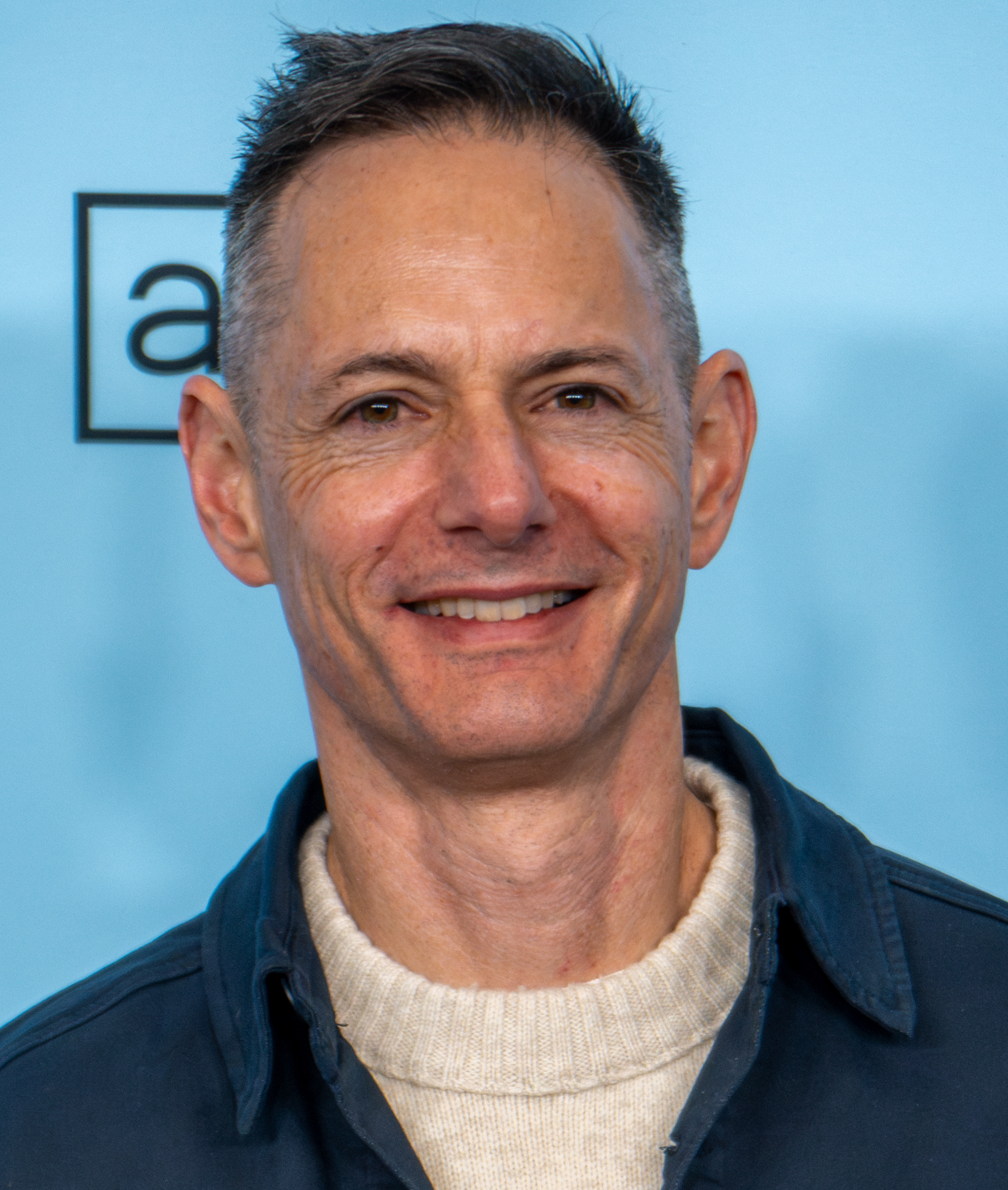
- Ben Ripley in 2025
- Born: Lawrenceville, New Jersey
- Occupation: Screenwriter
- Known for: Source Code

Ben Ripley is an American screenwriter best known for writing the science-fiction thriller Source Code directed by Duncan Jones. Ripley is a graduate of Stanford University and the University of Southern California's USC School of Cinema-Television.

== History ==
Ripley sold his spec script for Source Code in 2007 to Universal Studios. It was ranked as one of the top unproduced screenplays in the annual Hollywood black list. In an interview with the Writers Guild of America, Ripley talked about his script and the uncertainty over its production:

Yeah, it was agony. And I wrote it on spec. I wasn't certain it would ever see the light of day. One thing that kept me going though was that I had a suspicion that if I got this right, it could really open a new level for my writing career. At that point, I'd spent about four years doing studio rewrites on horror movies that were never getting made. I knew that if I showed up with another spec script, I'd have to show up with something very different that took chances. That motivated me to keep going until it seemed right.

== Personal life ==
As of 2014, Ben Ripley lived in Lawrenceville, New Jersey.

== Screenplays ==
- Species III (2004)
- Species: The Awakening (2007)
- The Watch (2008)
- Source Code (2011)
- Boychoir (2014)
- Flatliners (2017)
- Last Days (2025)
