= Bruce Olson =

American Christian missionary (1941-)

Bruce E. Olson
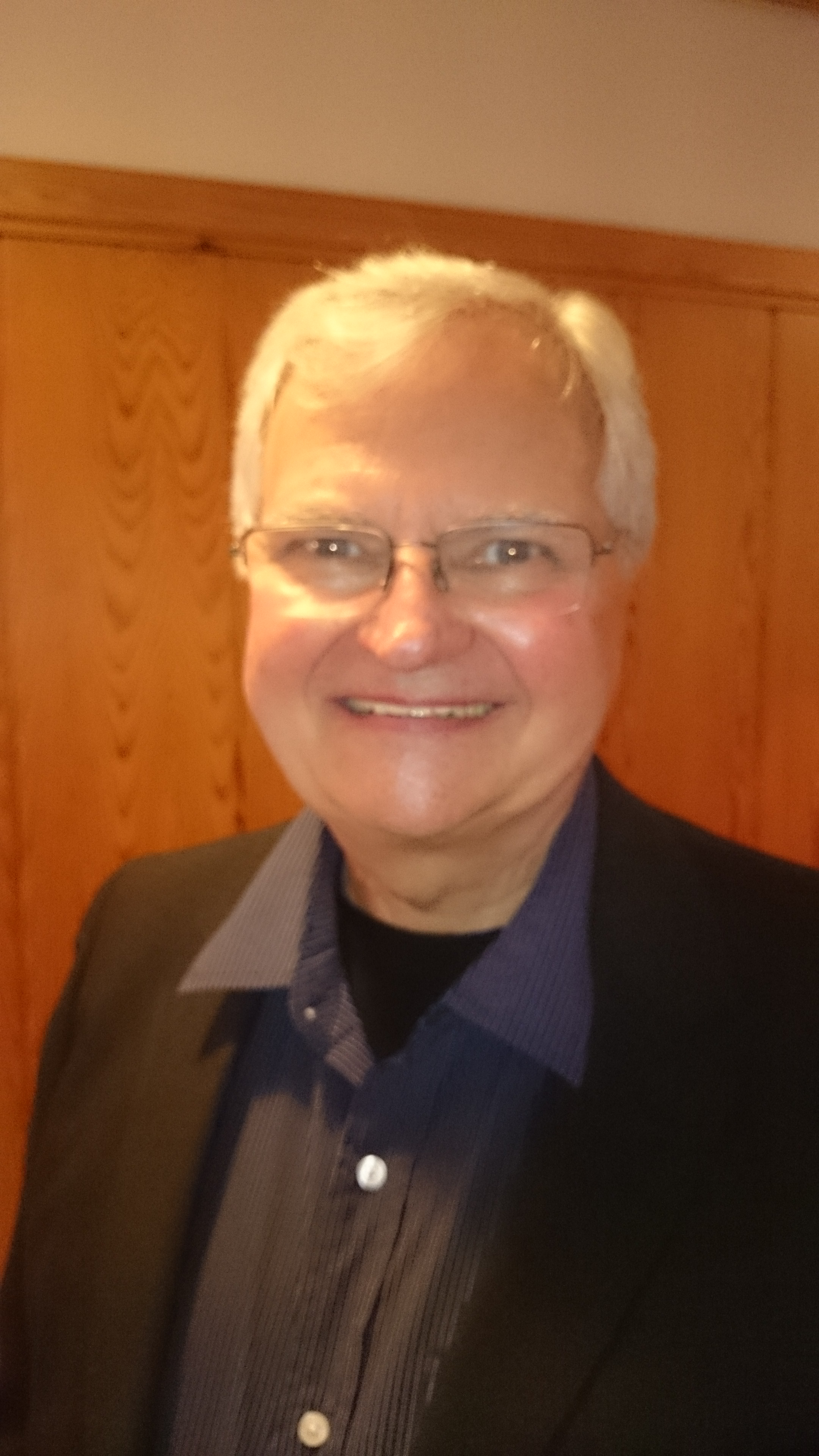
- Olson in 2014
- Born: November 10, 1941 (age 84); Saint Paul, Minnesota
- Other name: Bruchko
- Occupation: Christian missionary
- Website: www.bruceolson.com/en

Bruce Olson (born November 10, 1941) is a Scandinavian American Christian missionary best known for his work in bringing Christianity to the Barí people of Colombia and Venezuela. Olson's 1973 autobiographical book Bruchko has sold more than 300,000 copies worldwide and is translated into several languages. One journalist has asserted that the book is a touchstone of missionary literature. Olson was granted Colombian citizenship in 1988 and, as of a year later, was still living in a Motilone village.

Swedish anthropologists accused Olson of destroying an aboriginal tribe and called for him and other Christian missionaries and linguists to be expelled. This scrutiny compelled Swedish journalist Andres Küng to travel all the way to the Colombian jungle to investigate and interview Olson personally. Küng's findings were quickly published in support of Olson.

John Allen Chau, who identified Olson as a major source of inspiration, was killed by the isolated Sentinelese tribe while attempting to convert them to Christianity in 2018.

== Biography ==
Shortly after arriving in Venezuela, Olson heard about the Motilone, a tribe living on the borders of Venezuela and Colombia that had been in the news because of violent clashes with oil company employees seeking to drill on their land.

Olson received international attention when he was kidnapped by the National Liberation Army (ELN) on 24 October 1988. The ELN judged him in the revolutionary justice system, and found him guilty of exploiting the Motilones. He was condemned to die, and his execution was planned. On July 6, 1989, the ELN told the media:

Mr. Bruce Olson has deliberately and irresponsibly incurred very serious crimes in developing an exploitative activity and colonizing, decimating a third of its population during the years from 1963 to 1970. For the veracity of the charges made, we consider him guilty of a crime against humanity against the Colombian Motilone groups, and consequently we condemn him to the penalty of death.

Journalist Maria Cristina Caballero published a series of articles in which she personally investigated Olson's thirty-year stay with the Motilone and also interviewed many indigenous leaders. Olson was released after nine months in captivity largely due to the attention prompted by Caballero's articles. The president of Colombia later said of Olson, "This is the first white man to be defended by the indigenous communities in our country, in Latin America."

== The Barí ==
Current estimates are that 70% of the Barí people are now Christians.
