= Barí language =

Language of Colombia and Venezuela

Barí
- Barira, Cunausaya, Dobocubi, Motilón, Motilone
- Barí ara
- Native to: Colombia, Venezuela
- Region: Norte de Santander Department, Serranía de los Motilones, Upper Catatumbo and Oro River region, Reserva Indígena Motilón-Barí and Resguardo Indígena Gabarra-Catalaura; also in Cesar Department, Chimichagua, La Gloria, and Pailitas municipalities
- Ethnicity: Motilon people
- Native speakers: 5,000 (2007–2008)
- Language family: Chibchan: Chibcha–Motilon; Barí

Language codes
- ISO 639-3: mot
- Glottolog: bari1297
- ELP: Barí
- Linguasphere: 81-EHA-aa
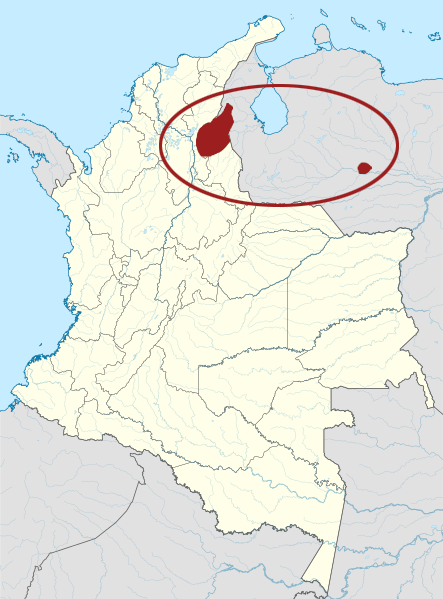

Barí is a Chibchan language spoken in Northwestern South America by the Barí (Motilon), by 5,000 people. It is not endangered, as the language is still being taught to children, although the Bari have acculturated to the national culture.

== Status ==
The 18th edition of the Ethnologue, a catalogue of the world's languages, reports a total of 5,000 speakers between 2007 and 2008. As of 2004, 150 speakers of Bari, primarily elderly, were monolingual in the language, meaning they could only speak that language. Children learn Bari as their first language, meaning it is not endangered, although young men between the ages of 20 and 40 tend to use Spanish in their everyday conversation, only using Bari whenever there are strangers. However, the community has assimilated culturally to Venezuelan culture, though keeping a few of their traditional customs. Spanish is taught to the Bari in school.

== Phonology ==
=== Vowels ===
Barí has six vowels: /i, e, a, ɨ, o, u/. All vowels have nasalized forms as /ĩ, ẽ, ã, ɨ̃, õ, ũ/.

=== Consonants ===
Consonants
		Bilabial	Alveolar	Palatal	Velar	Glottal
Plosive	voiceless		t		k	
Plosive	voiced	b	d			
Fricative			s			h
Nasal		m	n	ɲ		
Trill			r			

== Morphology ==
=== Nouns ===
Nouns in Bari are composed of roots or nominalized derivations, the latter of which may be derived from a verb and the suffix -bãy, to express the "doer" of the action, or added to perception verbs to create nouns for appliances (e.g. bisjiji 'see' to bisjijibãy 'TV set'). Nouns are not marked for case. Excepting numerals, no distinction exists between mass and count nouns, as quantifiers may be used with both verbs.

=== Pronouns ===
Personal pronouns in Bari distinguish both number and switch-reference, the latter being distinguished solely in the third person plural.

Bari personal pronouns
		singular	plural
1		nay	chiji
2		bay	biji
3	same subject	obãy	obãyji
3	different subject	obãy	Orachji

== Vocabulary ==
Barí	Spanish	English
ĩĩtoupʔ	uno	one
ĩĩsaami	dos	two
tentoḳou, bitentoḳou	tres	three
la	hombre	man
byoo	mujer	woman
ḍuraaba	perro	dog
nyaa	sol	sun
čibaɨg	luna	moon
šiima	agua	water
ihtãã	tierra	earth
dyɨra	montaña	mountain
tubīkā	rocío	dew
