= Bruchko =

1973 book by Bruce E. Olson

- Author: Bruce Olson
- Language: English
- Subject: Christian missions, Indigenous peoples of South America, Autobiography
- Genre: Non-fiction, autobiography
- Publisher: Creation House
- Publication date: 1973
- Publication place: United States
- Media type: Print (Hardcover and Paperback)
- Pages: 192 (varies by edition)

Bruchko is an autobiographical book by Bruce Olson, telling the story of his work as a Christian missionary with the Barí people, an indigenous tribe in Colombia and Venezuela.

The book begins by describing Olson's unusual experience of conversion to Christianity in a church that did not recognize it. He later states to have felt a distinct calling from God to move to South America and share his faith with the Motilone tribe near the border of Colombia and Venezuela, despite warnings about their purported violence and killings. After years of disease, torture, and other misfortune he finally gains acceptance with the Motilone. Largely through his friendship with Bobarishora ("Bobby"), Olson ("Bruchko") introduces the tribe to Christianity. He reports his personal discovery that Jesus himself will lead His church, that the Gospel does not require destruction of indigenous culture, and that suffering is often a necessary part of the Christian life.
