= Whistle (2025 film) =

Film by Corin Hardy

- Canadian theatrical release poster
- Directed by: Corin Hardy
- Written by: Owen Egerton
- Produced by: David Gross; Whitney Brown; Macdara Kelleher; John Keville
- Starring: Dafne Keen; Sophie Nélisse; Sky Yang; Jhaleil Swaby; Ali Skovbye; Percy Hynes White; Michelle Fairley; Nick Frost
- Cinematography: Björn Charpentier
- Edited by: Nicholas Emerson
- Music by: Doomphonic
- Production companies: No Trace Camping; Wild Atlantic Pictures
- Distributed by: Elevation Pictures (Canada); Black Bear Pictures (Ireland and the United Kingdom)
- Release dates: 25 September 2025 (Fantastic Fest); 6 February 2026 (North America); 13 February 2026 (Ireland and United Kingdom)
- Running time: 100 minutes (Note: Fantastic Fest lists the runtime as 97 minutes, while the final theatrical runtime is 100 minutes.)
- Countries: Canada; Ireland
- Language: English
- Box office: US$5 million

Whistle is a 2025 supernatural horror film directed by Corin Hardy and written by Owen Egerton. It stars Dafne Keen, Sophie Nélisse, Sky Yang, Jhaleil Swaby, Ali Skovbye, Percy Hynes White, Michelle Fairley, and Nick Frost. The film follows a group of students who find an Aztec death whistle and discover that the sound it emits will summon their future deaths to hunt them down.

Whistle premiered at Fantastic Fest on 25 September 2025 and was released in the United Kingdom and Ireland on 13 February.

== Plot ==
During a high school basketball game, star athlete Mason "Horse" Raymore is haunted by visions of a burned man before mysteriously bursting into flames and dying. Months later, transfer student Chrys Willet inherits Mason's old locker and finds a skull-shaped whistle. When provoked by Mason's former teammate Dean, both he and Chrys are sent to detention by Mr. Craven, along with her cousin Rel, Dean's girlfriend Grace, and Ellie, a smart girl with diabetes.

After detention, Craven confiscates the whistle and, planning to sell it, blows it to test its condition, while Rel later sneaks back and steals it. Unbeknownst to Rel, Craven — who is constantly smoking — is soon killed by a grotesque apparition of himself that forcefully crushes his lungs. Later, the detained students also blow the whistle, whose sound causes them to be haunted by their own apparitions.

The next morning, Craven's death is reported as extreme stage lung cancer, which baffles those who knew him since he exhibited none of the symptoms from the day prior. Chrys and Ellie later learn from Mason's occult-collecting grandmother, Ivy, that the whistle is an Aztec death whistle inscribed with the phrase "summon your death". Anyone who hears it becomes stalked and is eventually killed by a manifestation of their destined demise. Despite their attempts to warn the others, Grace dies after rapidly aging into an old woman, and Dean is later killed in a manner resembling a car crash. When Chrys, Ellie, and Rel visit Ivy on her deathbed, she reveals that the curse can be avoided by marking another person with their blood, while their respective demise is nearby, and transferring it to them before dying.

Rel abducts violent youth pastor and drug dealer Noah at the church, and attempts to mark him with his blood, but Chrys and Ellie intervene, refusing to sacrifice someone else. Rel relents, but is soon killed by his apparition, which tears him apart like a junkyard shredder. Chrys and Ellie discover the curse can also be escaped by briefly dying and being revived, and Ellie has the medical supplies and equipment at hand having kept such in her car for emergencies. While attempting to stop their hearts and resuscitate each other, Noah escapes and confronts them, but after touching Ellie's blood, he inadvertently transfers the curse to him and he is killed by his own apparition.

Three months later, Chrys and Ellie are now together and believe the curse has ended, until new student Asha Nelson opens her locker and discovers the whistle inside.

In a mid-credits scene, Asha is called to the stage at a school assembly in the auditorium to play the school anthem on her violin to kick off the spring semester but instead pulls out the whistle. Chrys and Ellie try to scream for her to stop, but she blows the whistle anyway and dooms everyone in the auditorium.

== Cast ==
- Dafne Keen as Chrys Willet
- Sophie Nélisse as Ellie Gains, Chrys's love interest
- Sky Yang as Rel Taylor, Chrys's cousin
- Jhaleil Swaby as Dean Jackson, a high school basketball player
- Ali Skovbye as Grace Browning, Dean's girlfriend
- Percy Hynes White as Noah Haggerty, a youth pastor and drug dealer
- Michelle Fairley as Ivy Raymore, Mason's grandmother
- Nick Frost as Mr. Craven
- Stephen Kalyn as Mason Raymore, a recently deceased high school basketball player
- Conrad Coates as Clayton Jackson, a high school basketball player
- Mikayla Kong as Asha Nelson

== Production ==
Whistle was written by Owen Egerton from an adaptation of his short story and directed by Corin Hardy. A Canadian and Irish co-production, it was produced by David Gross for No Trace Camping and Macdara Kelleher for Wild Atlantic Pictures. In October 2023, Dafne Keen, Sophie Nélisse, Sky Yang, Percy Hynes White and Nick Frost were added to the cast.

Principal photography took place in Hamilton, Ontario, from 15 November 2023 to 19 January 2024. Scenes were shot at Delta Secondary School, a house off Aberdeen Avenue, and at the Rockton Fairgrounds.

== Release ==
In October 2023, Black Bear Pictures handled sales at the American Film Market. In May 2025, Independent Film Company and Shudder acquired the U.S. distribution rights to the film.

Whistle premiered at Fantastic Fest on 25 September 2025, and was released in the United States on 6 February 2026. Black Bear Pictures was released the film in the United Kingdom and Ireland on 13 February.

In 2026, unused footage of the film was used to create a music video for the Gunship cover of "Time After Time".

== Reception ==
On the review aggregator website Rotten Tomatoes, 65% of 114 critics' reviews are positive, with an average rating of 5.6/10. The website's consensus reads: "Whistle doesn't blow it when it comes to milking some memorable frights from its nifty conceit, although this horror flick could've dared to be more original beyond its main hook." Metacritic, which uses a weighted average, assigned the film a score of 55 out of 100, based on 9 critics, indicating "mixed or average" reviews.
