= Aztec death whistle =

Ancient whistle used by the Mexica

The Aztec death whistle is a type of whistle formerly used by the Mexica people. Though the original whistles likely made a wind-like sound, modern replicas usually produce a high-pitched shrieking sound and are most commonly used to scare off people or animals.

== Discovery ==
In the late 1990s, at the Tlatelolco site in Mexico City, the excavation of a temple dedicated to the Aztec wind deity Ehecatl revealed the remains of a 20-year-old male sacrificial victim clutching various musical instruments, among them a small ceramic skull-shaped whistle. This artifact, later dubbed the "Aztec death whistle", gathered public interest.

== Analysis ==
The whistle's sounds, analyzed through its functioning mechanism, have been noted to resemble the sound of wind and fall within the human hearing sensitivity range. Experimental models of death whistles have been constructed and tested to explore hypotheses and for use in conferences and demonstrations, given that the original ancient resonators cannot be utilized for these purposes.

A common misconception is that this whistle produced a sharp shriek-like sound. However, these sounds credited as the Aztec death whistle are actually produced by much larger reproductions of the whistle. Music archeologist Arnd Adje Both, who has tested the original excavated whistles, reports that the actual sound produced is far softer, describing it as similar to "atmospheric noise generated by the wind."

== Use ==
The skeleton was unearthed within a temple devoted to the wind god Ehecatl, prompting speculation among scholars that the whistles were intended to mimic the sound of the wind. This could be because summoning a strong wind at will, as required in rituals or ceremonies, may not have been feasible. The only known reference to the potential ancient use of this type of whistle comes from this excerpt in Lewis Spence's 1913 book Myths of Mexico and Peru:

The most remarkable festival in connection with Tezcatlipoca was the Toxcatl, held in the fifth month. On the day of this festival, a youth was slain, who for an entire year previously, had been carefully instructed in the role of victim... He assumed the name, garb, and attributes of Tezcatlipoca himself... [as] the earthly representative of the deity.... He carried also the whistle symbolical of the deity [as Lord of the Night Wind], and made with it a noise such as the weird wind of night makes when it hurries through the streets.

The idea has been popularized that hundreds of warriors would use the whistle at the same time. However, there is limited evidence to support this claim. Music archeologist Arnd Adje Both suggests that the purpose of the whistle – based on its location at the base of a temple, its imagery related to death, and the lack of whistles ever discovered at battle sites or in warrior graves – was far more likely to be ceremonial or religious and not warfare-related. However, the symbolic purpose and actual use of the whistle is currently mostly speculative and requires further investigation.

== In popular culture ==
The whistle was referenced in Ghostbusters: Afterlife (2021), as an item in the collection of Egon Spengler. The stylized prop itself was constructed by MythBusters host Adam Savage and Allie Weber. The whistle is a central element in the 2025 horror film, Whistle.
