= Source Code =

2011 film by Duncan Jones

- Theatrical release poster
- Directed by: Duncan Jones
- Written by: Ben Ripley
- Produced by: Mark Gordon; Jordan Wynn; Philippe Rousselet
- Starring: Jake Gyllenhaal; Michelle Monaghan; Vera Farmiga; Jeffrey Wright
- Cinematography: Don Burgess
- Edited by: Paul Hirsch
- Music by: Chris Bacon
- Production companies: Vendôme Pictures; The Mark Gordon Company
- Distributed by: Summit Entertainment
- Release dates: March 11, 2011 (SXSW); April 1, 2011 (United States); April 20, 2011 (France)
- Running time: 93 minutes
- Countries: United States; France
- Language: English
- Budget: $32 million
- Box office: $147 million

Source Code is a 2011 science fiction action thriller film directed by Duncan Jones and written by Ben Ripley. It stars Jake Gyllenhaal as a US Army officer who is sent into an eight-minute virtual re-creation of a real-life train explosion, and tasked with determining the identity of the terrorist who bombed it. Michelle Monaghan, Vera Farmiga, and Jeffrey Wright play supporting roles.

It had its world premiere on March 11, 2011, at South by Southwest and was released by Summit Entertainment on April 1, 2011, in North America and Europe. It received positive reviews from critics and was a box office success, grossing $147 million on a $32 million budget.

== Plot ==
U.S. Army pilot Captain Colter Stevens wakes up on a Metra commuter train going into Chicago. He is disoriented, as his last memory was of flying a mission in Afghanistan. However, to the world around him – including his friend Christina Warren and his reflection in the train's windows and mirrors – he appears to be a different man: a school teacher named Sean Fentress. As he expresses his confusion to Christina, the train explodes while passing another train, killing everyone aboard.

Stevens abruptly awakens in a dimly lit cockpit. Communicating through a video screen, Air Force Captain Colleen Goodwin verifies Stevens's identity and tells him of his mission to find the train bomber before sending him back to the moment he awoke on the train. Believing he is being tested in a simulation, Stevens finds the bomb in a vent inside the lavatory but is unable to identify the bomber. Still thinking he is in a simulation, Stevens leaves the bomb and goes back down to the main cabin before the train explodes again.

Stevens again reawakens in his capsule and after demanding to be briefed, learns that the train explosion actually happened and that it was merely the first attack of a suspected series. He is sent back yet again, eight minutes before the explosion, to identify the bomber. This time, he disembarks from the train (with Christina) to follow a suspect. This turns out to be a dead end, the train still explodes in the distance, and Stevens is killed by a passing train after falling onto the tracks while interrogating the suspect.

The capsule power supply malfunctions as Stevens reawakens. He claims to have saved Christina, but Dr. Rutledge, head of the project, tells him that she was saved only inside the "Source Code". Rutledge explains that the Source Code is an experimental machine that reconstructs the past using the dead passengers' residual collective memories of eight minutes before their deaths. Therefore, the only thing that matters is finding the bomber to prevent the upcoming second attack in Chicago.

On the next run, Stevens learns that he was reported as killed in action two months earlier. He confronts Goodwin, who reveals that he is missing most of his body, is on life support, and is hooked up to neural sensors. The capsule and his healthy body are "manifestations" made by his mind to make sense of the environment. Stevens is angry at this forced imprisonment. Rutledge offers to terminate him after the mission, and Stevens eventually accepts.

After numerous attempts, including being arrested by train security for trying to obtain a weapon, Stevens identifies the bomber through a fallen wallet as the nihilistic domestic terrorist Derek Frost. He memorizes Frost's license and vehicle registration plates, and discovers a dirty bomb built inside a van owned by Frost; Christina follows him, and Frost shoots both of them dead.

Outside the Source Code, Stevens relays his knowledge to Goodwin, which helps the police arrest Frost and prevents the second attack. He is congratulated for completing his mission. Rutledge secretly reneges on his deal to let Stevens die, as he is still the only candidate able to enter the Source Code.

Being more sympathetic to his plight, Goodwin sends Stevens back one last time and promises to disconnect his life support after eight minutes. This time, he sets a date with Christina, defuses the bomb, apprehends Frost, and reports him to the police. He calls his father under the guise of a fellow soldier and reconciles with him, and sends Goodwin an email. After eight minutes, Goodwin terminates Stevens's life support.

As the world around him continues to progress beyond eight minutes, Stevens confirms his suspicion that the Source Code is not merely a simulation, but rather a machine that allows the creation of alternate timelines. He and Christina leave the train and go on a date. In the same (alternate) reality, Goodwin receives Stevens' message. He tells her of the Source Code's true capability and asks her to help the alternate-reality version of him.

== Cast ==
- Jake Gyllenhaal as Captain Colter Stevens
- Michelle Monaghan as Christina Warren
- Vera Farmiga as Captain Colleen Goodwin
- Jeffrey Wright as Dr. Rutledge
- Michael Arden as Derek Frost
- Russell Peters as Max Denoff
- Frédérick De Grandpré as Sean Fentress
- Cas Anvar as Hazmi
- Scott Bakula as Donald Stevens, Colter's father (Voice only)

== Production ==
=== Pre-production ===
David Hahn, the boy depicted in the 2003 made-for-television documentary The Nuclear Boy Scout, was the inspiration for the antagonist Derek Frost. In an article published by the Writers Guild of America, screenwriter Ben Ripley is described as providing the original pitch to the studios responsible for producing Source Code:

When Ripley first came up with the idea for Source Code, in which government operative Colter Stevens repeatedly relives the eight minutes leading up to a terrorist train bombing in hopes of finding the bomber, he had no intention of writing it on spec. Having established himself in Hollywood largely doing "studio rewrites on horror movies", he felt a solid pitch would do the trick. Unfortunately, it didn't. "I sat down with a few producers, and the first couple just looked at me like I was nuts", confesses Ripley. "Ultimately, I had to put it on the page to make my case."

The original spec script was originally sold to Universal Pictures in 2007 but was ranked on The Black List of top unproduced screenplays.

After seeing Moon, Gyllenhaal lobbied for Jones to direct Source Code; Jones liked the fast-paced script; as he later said: "There were all sorts of challenges, and puzzles, and I kind of like solving puzzles, so it was kind of fun for me to work out how to achieve all these difficult things that were set up in the script."

In the ending scene, Jake Gyllenhaal and Michelle Monaghan's characters are seen walking through Millennium Park and making their way to the Cloud Gate. In a 2011 interview, Gyllenhaal discussed how director Duncan Jones felt that the structure was a metaphor for the movie's subject matter and aimed for it to feature at the beginning and end of the movie.

=== Filming ===
Principal photography began on March 1, 2010, in Montreal, Quebec, and ended on April 29, 2010. Several scenes were shot in Chicago, Illinois, specifically at Millennium Park and the Main Building at the Illinois Institute of Technology, although the sign showing the name of the latter, in the intersection of 31st Street and S LaSalle Street, was edited out.

Initially, some filming was scheduled at the Ottawa Train Station in Ottawa, Ontario, but was canceled for lack of an agreement with VIA Rail.

=== Post-production ===
Editing took place in Los Angeles. In July 2010, the film was in the visual effects stage of postproduction. Most of the VFX work was handled by Montreal studios, including Moving Picture Company, Rodeo FX, Oblique FX, and Fly Studio. Jones had confirmed that the film's soundtrack would be composed by Clint Mansell, in his second collaboration with the composer. Mansell was announced as no longer scoring the soundtrack due to time constraints.

== Release ==
=== Theatrical ===
The film received its world premiere at South by Southwest on March 11, 2011. Summit Entertainment released the film to theaters in the United States and Canada on April 1, 2011. In France, the film was released on April 20, 2011.

=== Home media ===
Source Code was released on DVD and Blu-ray simultaneously in the United States on July 26, 2011, with the United Kingdom release on DVD and Blu-ray (as well as a combined DVD/Blu-ray package) on August 15, 2011. In the UK, there was also a Blu-ray/DVD "Double Play" release featuring a lenticular slipcover.

== Reception ==
=== Box office ===
Source Code grossed $54.7 million in the United States and Canada and $92.6 million in other territories, for a worldwide total of $147 million, against a production budget of $32 million.

The film was released in theaters on April 1, 2011. In the United States and Canada, Source Code was released theatrically in 2,961 conventional theaters. The film made $14.8 million and debuted second on its opening weekend.

Despite its grosses, according to director Duncan Jones, the studio claims that the film has never turned a profit, which is attributed to Hollywood accounting.

=== Critical response ===
Review aggregator website Rotten Tomatoes reports a 92% approval rating, based on an aggregation of 262 reviews, with an average rating of 7.5/10. The site's consensus reads: "Finding the human story amidst the action, director Duncan Jones and charming Jake Gyllenhaal craft a smart, satisfying sci-fi thriller." Metacritic awarded the film an average score of 74/100, based on 41 reviews, indicating "generally favorable reviews". Audiences polled by CinemaScore gave the film an average grade of "B" on an A+ to F scale.

Critics have compared Source Code with both the 1993 film Groundhog Day and British film director Tony Scott's 2006 time-altering science fiction film Déjà Vu: in the latter case, the similarity of plotline in the protagonist's determination to change the past was highlighted, and his emotional commitment to save the victim, rather than simply try to discover the identity of the perpetrator of the crime. Alternatively, it has been described as a "cross between Groundhog Day and Murder on the Orient Express", while The Arizona Republic film critic Bill Goodykoontz says that comparing Source Code to Groundhog Day is doing a disservice to Source Code's enthralling "mind game".

Richard Roeper of the Chicago Sun-Times called the film "Confounding, exhilarating, challenging – and the best movie I've seen so far in 2011." Roger Ebert gave the film 3.5 stars out of 4, calling it "an ingenious thriller" where "you forgive the preposterous because it takes you to the perplexing". Kenneth Turan of the Los Angeles Times called Ben Ripley's script "cleverly constructed" and a film "crisply directed by Duncan Jones". He also praised the "cast with the determination and ability to really sell its story". CNN called Ripley's script "ingenious" and the film "as authoritative an exercise in fractured storytelling as Christopher Nolan's Memento". He also commented that Gyllenhaal is "more compelling here than he's been in a long time".

=== Accolades ===
Year	Group	Category	Recipient(s)	Result
2011	Scream Awards	Best Science Fiction Actor	Jake Gyllenhaal	Nominated
2011	Bradbury Award	Bradbury Award	Ben Ripley and Duncan Jones	Nominated
2012	Hugo Award	Best Dramatic Presentation, Long Form	Ben Ripley and Duncan Jones	Nominated
2012	Visual Effects Society Awards	Outstanding Supporting Visual Effects in a Feature Motion Picture	Annie Godin, Louis Morin	Nominated

== See also ==
- List of films featuring time loops
