= North Sentinel Island =

Island in the Bay of Bengal

North Sentinel
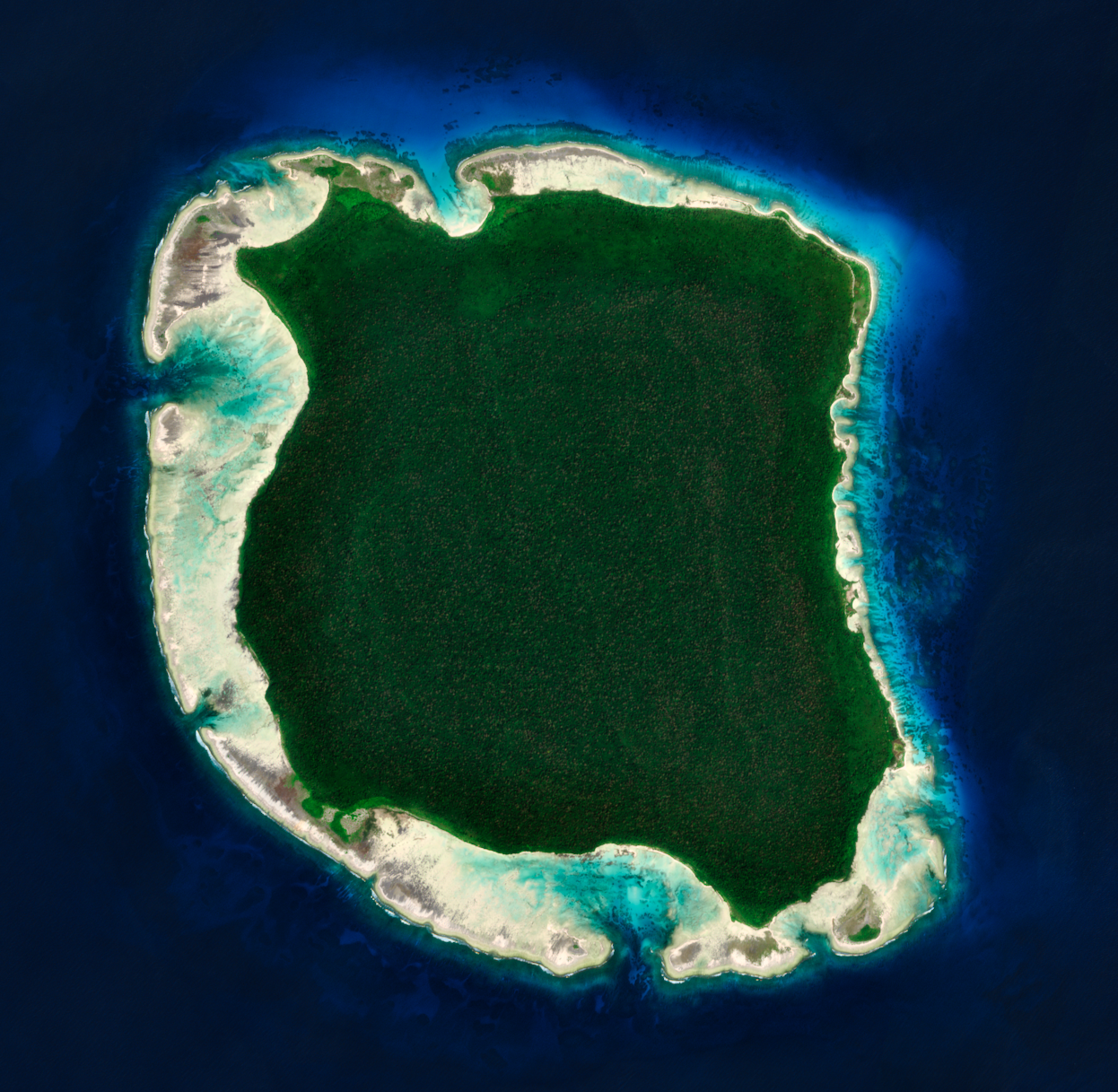
- North Sentinel Island in 2023

- Location in Andaman Islands

- Location in Andaman and Nicobar Islands

Geography
- Location: Bay of Bengal
- Coordinates: 11°34′39″N 92°14′40″E
- Archipelago: Andaman Islands; Sentinel Islands
- Adjacent to: Bay of Bengal
- Area: 59.67 km^{2} (23.04 sq mi)
- Length: 7.8 km (4.85 mi)
- Width: 7.0 km (4.35 mi)
- Coastline: 31.6 km (19.64 mi)
- Highest elevation: 122 m (400 ft)

Administration
- India
- Union territory: The Andaman and Nicobar Islands
- District: South Andaman
- Tehsil: Srivijayapuram

Demographics
- Demonym: North Sentinelese; North Sentinel Islander; Sentinelese
- Population: Unknown; Wide estimate: 15–500; Narrow estimate: 50–200
- Population rank: Unknown
- Ethnic groups: Sentinelese

Additional information
- Time zone: IST (UTC+5:30)
- PIN: 744202
- ISO code: IN-AN-00
- Census Code: 35.639.0004

North Sentinel Island is one of the Andaman Islands, an Indian archipelago in the Bay of Bengal. A protected area of India, it is home to the Sentinelese, an uncontacted indigenous tribe who have defended—often with violence—their protected isolation from the outside world.

The Andaman and Nicobar Islands Protection of Aboriginal Tribes Regulation 1956 prohibits travel to the island and any approach closer than five kilometres (three miles), in order to protect the remaining tribal community from "mainland" infectious diseases against which they likely have no acquired immunity. The area is patrolled by the Indian Navy.

Nominally, the island belongs to the South Andaman administrative district, part of the Indian union territory of Andaman and Nicobar Islands. In practice, Indian authorities recognise the islanders' desire to be left alone, restricting outsiders to remote monitoring (by boat and sometimes air) from a reasonably safe distance; the Government of India will not prosecute the Sentinelese for killing people in the event that an outsider ventures ashore. In 2018, the Government of India excluded 29 islands—including North Sentinel—from the Restricted Area Permit (RAP) regime, in a major effort to boost tourism. In November 2018, the government's home ministry stated that the relaxation of the prohibition on visitations was intended to allow researchers and anthropologists (with pre-approved clearance) to visit the Sentinel islands.

The Sentinelese have repeatedly attacked approaching vessels, whether the boats were intentionally visiting the island or simply ran aground on the surrounding coral reef. The islanders have been observed shooting arrows at boats, as well as at low-flying helicopters. Such attacks have resulted in injury and death. In 2006, islanders killed two fishermen whose boat had drifted ashore, and in 2018 an American Christian missionary, 26-year-old John Allen Chau, was killed after he illegally attempted to make contact with the islanders three separate times by paying local fishermen to transport him to the island.

== History ==
The Onge, one of the other indigenous peoples of the Andamans, were aware of North Sentinel Island's existence; their traditional name for the island is Chia daaKwokweyeh. They also have strong cultural similarities with what little has been remotely observed amongst the Sentinelese. However, Onges brought to North Sentinel Island by the British during the 19th century could not understand the language spoken by the North Sentinelese; as such, a significant period of separation is likely.

=== British visits ===
British surveyor John Ritchie observed "a multitude of lights" from an East India Company hydrographic survey vessel, the Diligent, as it passed by the island in 1771. Homfray, an administrator, travelled to the island in March 1867.

Towards the end of the same year's summer monsoon season, Nineveh, an Indian merchant ship, was wrecked on a reef near the island. The 106 surviving passengers and crewmen landed on the beach in the ship's boat and fended off attacks by the Sentinelese. They were eventually found by a Royal Navy rescue party.

==== Portman's expeditions ====
An expedition led by Maurice Vidal Portman, a government administrator who hoped to research the natives and their customs, landed on North Sentinel Island in January 1880. The group found a network of pathways and several small, abandoned villages. After several days, six Sentinelese—an elderly couple and four children—were taken to Port Blair. The colonial officer in charge of the operation wrote that the entire group "sickened rapidly, and the old man and his wife died, so the four children were sent back to their home with quantities of presents".

A second landing was made by Portman on 27 August 1883 after the eruption of Krakatoa was mistaken for gunfire and interpreted as the distress signal of a ship. A search party landed on the island and left gifts before returning to Port Blair. Portman visited the island several more times between January 1885 and January 1887.

=== After Indian independence ===
==== Early landings ====
Indian exploratory parties under orders to establish friendly relations with the Sentinelese made brief landings on the island every few years beginning in 1967. In 1975, Leopold III of Belgium, on a tour of the Andamans, was taken by local dignitaries for an overnight cruise to the waters off North Sentinel Island.

==== Shipwrecks ====
The cargo ship MV Rusley ran aground on coastal reefs in mid-1977, and the MV Primrose did so on 2 August 1981. After the Primrose grounded on the North Sentinel Island reef, crewmen several days later noticed that some men carrying spears and arrows were building boats on the beach. The captain of Primrose radioed for an urgent drop of firearms so his crew could defend themselves. They did not receive any because a large storm stopped other ships from reaching them, but the heavy seas also prevented the islanders from approaching the ship. A week later, the crewmen were rescued by a helicopter under contract to the Indian Oil and Natural Gas Corporation (ONGC).

The Sentinelese are known to have scavenged both shipwrecks for iron. Settlers from Port Blair also visited the sites to recover the cargo. In 1991, salvage operators were authorised to dismantle the ships.

==== First peaceful contact ====
Madhumala Chattopadhyay and members of the contact expedition team interacting with the Sentinelese people by offering coconuts

The first peaceful contact with the Sentinelese was made by Triloknath Pandit, a director of the Anthropological Survey of India (AnSI), and his colleagues on 4 January 1991. Among the team was Madhumala Chattopadhyay, the first female anthropologist to make contact with the tribe. During the encounter, Chattopadhyay called out to the islanders using tribal words she had learned from other Andamanese groups, inviting them to collect the coconuts. Although a young tribesman initially aimed a bow at the researchers, he lowered his weapon after being nudged by a woman on the shore, and the islanders began accepting coconuts directly from the researchers. Although Pandit, Chattopadhyay and their colleagues were able to make repeated friendly contact, no progress was made in understanding the Sentinelese language, and the Sentinelese repeatedly warned them off if they stayed too long. Indian visits to the island ceased in 1997.

Anthropologist Anstice Justin, who is himself from a Nicobarese tribe, made seven visits to the island starting in 1986. On these gift-dropping missions, he and his team exchanged bananas and coconuts with the Sentinelese people. Despite having no common language, the groups communicated and planted coconut saplings together. The expeditions stopped due to ethical concerns for the cultural and physical well-being of the tribespeople, as well as changes in Indian government policies.

==== Indian Ocean earthquake and later hostile contacts ====
The Sentinelese survived the 2004 Indian Ocean earthquake and its after-effects, including the tsunami and the uplifting of the island. Three days after the earthquake, an Indian government helicopter observed several islanders, who shot arrows and threw spears and stones at the helicopter. Although the tsunami disturbed the tribal fishing grounds, the Sentinelese appear to have adapted.

In January 2006, two Indian fishermen, Sunder Raj and Pandit Tiwari, were fishing illegally in prohibited waters and were killed by the Sentinelese when their boat drifted too close to the island. There were no prosecutions.

In April 2014, an aerial survey was conducted, with approximately sixteen individuals observed during one trip, all either exhibiting friendly gestures or appearing busy.

In November 2018, a 26-year-old American Christian missionary named John Allen Chau, who was trained and sent by Missouri-based All Nations, was killed during an illegal trip to the restricted island where he planned to preach Christianity to the Sentinelese. The 2023 documentary film The Mission discusses the incident. Seven individuals were taken into custody by Indian police on suspicion of abetting Chau's illegal access to the island. Entering a radius of five kilometres (three miles) around the island is illegal under Indian law. The fishermen who illegally ferried Chau to North Sentinel said they saw tribesmen drag his body along a beach and bury it. Despite efforts by Indian authorities, which involved a tense encounter with the tribe, Chau's body was not recovered. Indian officials made several attempts to recover the body but eventually abandoned those efforts. An anthropologist involved in the case told The Guardian that the risk of a dangerous clash between investigators and the islanders was too great to justify any further attempts.

In December 2022, three fishermen went missing after a fishing trip. Their boat has been spotted on North Sentinel Island by the local fishermen and the A&N administration, leading to the possibility of them either being stranded on the island or killed by the Sentinelese tribe.

In March 2025, another US citizen, Mykhailo Viktorvych Polyakov, known online as Neo-Orientalist, made an unauthorised landing on the island. He illegally left behind Diet Coke and coconuts, collected sand samples and recorded a video before returning. He was subsequently arrested by the Indian Police Service and presented before the local court. Following his arrest, he referred to himself as a "thrill seeker". Police have claimed that he attempted to conduct reconnaissance of North Sentinel Island in October 2024, and that he had explored other archipelago islands in January 2025 where he illegally recorded video footage of members of the protected Jarawa tribe.

== Geography ==
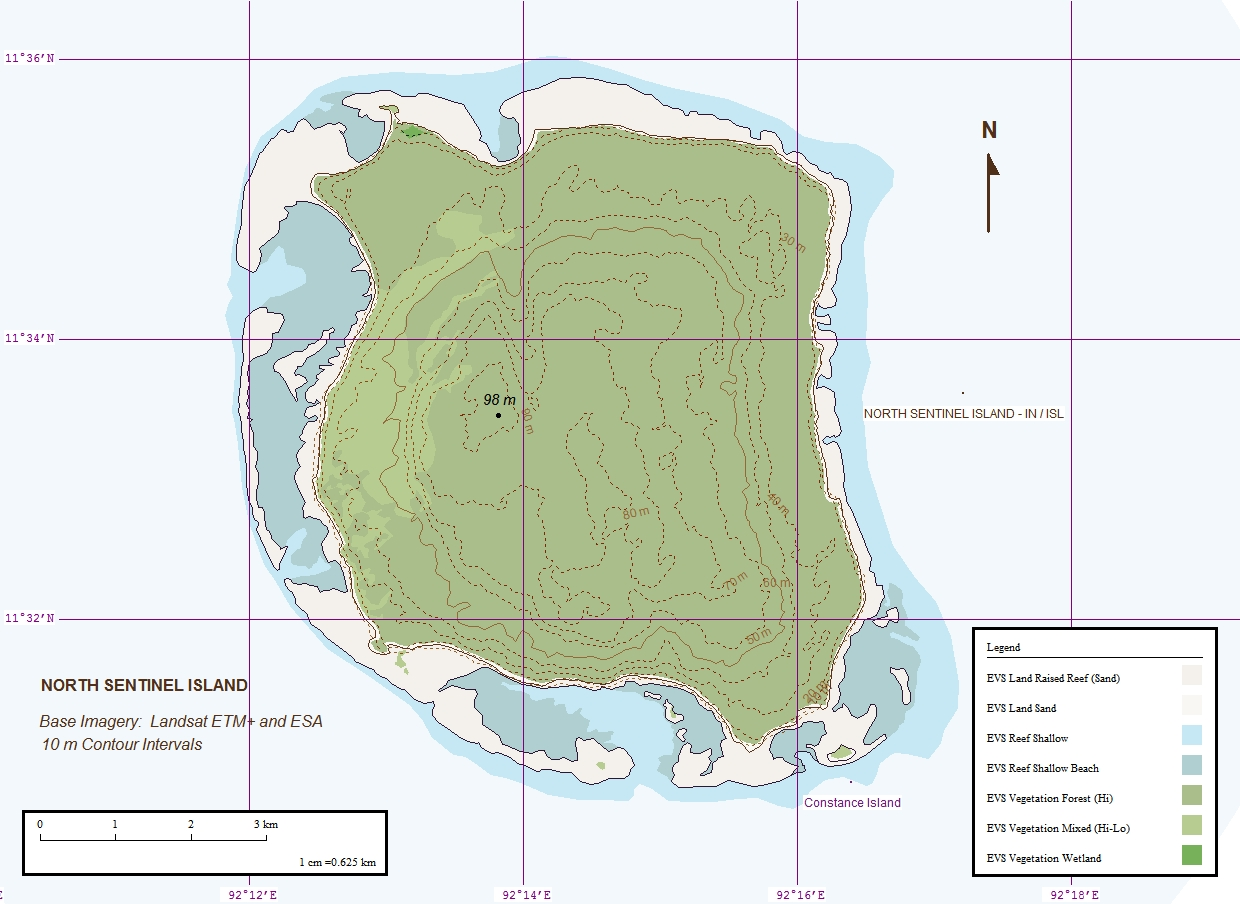
Landsat map

North Sentinel lies 36 km (22 mi) west of the village of Wandoor in South Andaman Island, 50 km (25 nmi) west of Port Blair, and 60 km (30 nmi) north of its counterpart South Sentinel Island. It has an area of about 59.67 km^{2} (23.04 sq mi) and a roughly square outline. North Sentinel Island, together with South Sentinel Island, forms the Sentinel Islands, a group of islands belonging to the Andaman Islands.

North Sentinel is surrounded by coral reefs, and lacks natural harbours. The entire island, other than the shore, is forested. There is a narrow, white-sand beach encircling the island, behind which the ground rises 20 metres (66 ft), and then gradually to between 46 and 122 metres (151 and 400 ft) near the centre. Reefs extend around the island to between 0.9 and 1.5 km (0.5–0.8 nmi) from the shore. A forested islet, Constance Island, also "Constance Islet", was located about 600 metres (2,000 ft) off the southeast coastline, at the edge of the reef.

The 2004 Indian Ocean earthquake tilted the tectonic plate under the island, lifting it by 1.5 and 2 m (4 ft 11 in and 6 ft 7 in). Large tracts of the surrounding coral reefs were exposed and became permanently dry land or shallow lagoons, extending all the island's boundaries—by as much as one kilometre (3,300 ft) on the west and south sides—and uniting Constance Islet with the main island.

== Climate ==
According to the Köppen climate classification, North Sentinel Island has a tropical climate. On the hottest days, temperatures can reach 29–30 °C (84–86 °F). The lowest temperature is usually around 25 °C (77 °F).

Climate data for North Sentinel Island
Month	Jan	Feb	Mar	Apr	May	Jun	Jul	Aug	Sep	Oct	Nov	Dec	Year
Mean daily maximum °C (°F)	27 (81)	27 (81)	28 (82)	29 (84)	29 (84)	29 (84)	28 (82)	28 (82)	28 (82)	28 (82)	28 (82)	28 (82)	28 (82)
Mean daily minimum °C (°F)	26 (79)	26 (79)	27 (81)	28 (82)	27 (81)	27 (81)	27 (81)	27 (81)	26 (79)	26 (79)	26 (79)	26 (79)	27 (80)
Source: MeteoBlue.com

== Flora and fauna ==
The island is largely covered in tropical and subtropical moist broadleaf forest. Due to the lack of surveys, the exact composition of the terrestrial flora and fauna remains unknown. In his 1880 expedition to the island, Maurice Vidal Portman reported an open, "park-like" jungle with numerous groves of bulletwood (Manilkara littoralis) trees, as well as huge, buttressed specimens of Malabar silk-cotton tree (Bombax ceiba). Indian boar (Sus scrofa cristatus) are apparently found on the island. The boar are a major food source for the Sentinelese, with reports by Portman referring to a "huge heap" of pig skulls near a Sentinelese village. The IUCN Red List lists North Sentinel as being an important habitat for coconut crabs (Birgus latro), which have been otherwise extirpated from most of the other Andaman Islands except from South Sentinel and Little Andaman. North Sentinel Island, along with South Sentinel, is also considered a globally Important Bird Area (IBA) by BirdLife International, as despite the lack of surveys, the pristine habitat likely supports a diversity of birdlife.

Coconut palms are reportedly absent from North Sentinel Island, as they were in the Andaman Islands overall prior to European colonization, despite the tropical climate and the proximity of the islands to landmasses with coconut palms. The absence is attributed to the indigenous people traditionally eating coconuts that washed ashore. During a 1985 visit to the island led by Triloknath Pandit, he reported that he could not see any coconut palms on the coast. In May 1987, his team planted some coconut saplings on the coast, and when he returned in March 1988, he reported that some of the saplings had grown. However, it is unknown whether these saplings ever grew into mature trees.

The marine ecosystem surrounding the island remains poorly surveyed. A substantial coral reef is known to encircle the island, and mangroves are present along its shores. A c. 1999 report by divers indicated that the reefs experienced significant bleaching during the 1998 El Niño, but have since shown evidence of coral regeneration. Sightings of sharks have also been reported in the surrounding waters. Sea turtles are believed to inhabit the area, as noted by Portman, who described them as an important food source for the Sentinelese; one individual was observed during the 1999 survey. Dolphins were also recorded during the same expedition.

== Demographics ==
North Sentinel Island is inhabited by the Sentinelese, indigenous people who defend their voluntary isolation by force. Their population was estimated to be between 50 and 400 people in a 2012 report. India's 2011 census indicates 15 residents in 10 households, but that too was merely an estimate, described as a "wild guess" by The Times of India. The official census numbers are merely a count of people that have been sighted by circumnavigating the island, and thus likely represents only a small part of the population.

Like the Jarawas, whose numbers have been decreasing, the Sentinelese population faces the potential threats of infectious diseases to which they have no immunity, as well as violence from intruders. The Indian government has declared the entire island and its surrounding waters extending five nautical miles (nine kilometres) from the island to be an exclusion zone to protect them from outside interference.

== Political status ==
The Andaman and Nicobar (Protection of Aboriginal Tribes) Regulation, 1956 provides protection to the Sentinelese and other native tribes in the region. The Andaman and Nicobar Administration stated in 2005 that they have no intention to interfere with the lifestyle or habitat of the Sentinelese and are not interested in pursuing any further contact with them or governing the island. Although North Sentinel Island is not legally an autonomous administrative division of India, scholars have referred to it and its people as effectively autonomous, or de facto sovereign.
