= John Allen Chau =

American missionary (1991–2018)

John Chau
- Born: December 18, 1991; Scottsboro, Alabama, U.S.
- Died: November 17, 2018 (aged 26); North Sentinel Island, Andaman and Nicobar Islands, India
- Cause of death: Arrow wound
- Resting place: North Sentinel Island
- Education: Oral Roberts University

John Allen Chau (December 18, 1991 – November 17, 2018) was an American Christian missionary who was killed by the Sentinelese, a tribe in voluntary isolation, after illegally traveling to North Sentinel Island in an attempt to evangelize them.

Born in Scottsboro, Alabama, Chau became interested in converting the Sentinelese to evangelical Christianity while in high school, inspired by the work of other pioneer missionaries. In preparation, he participated in missionary trips to Mexico, Israel, Iraq, and the Andaman Islands. He also underwent "boot camp"-style training conducted by the evangelical organization All Nations, which included mock scenarios coordinated by missionary staff who pretended to be hostile tribespeople. Before departing, Chau was vaccinated and quarantined, and brought with him a survival kit including picture cards and gifts for the Sentinelese. Upon arriving, Chau attempted to land on the island three times to no success. During his final attempt, he was fatally struck by an arrow of the Sentinelese, who buried his body on the shore.

The incident drew international attention and mostly negative reception. While some groups, including All Nations, described Chau as a Christian martyr, others, such as Survival International, criticized his visits for the risks they posed to both parties, particularly the potential transfer of deadly pathogens to the Sentinelese. The ethics behind Chau's visits have been studied at multiple universities, and two films have been made covering his life.

== Early life ==
Chau was born on December 18, 1991, in Scottsboro, Alabama. He was the third and youngest child of Lynda Adams-Chau, a White-American organizer for the Christian student organization Chi Alpha, and Patrick Chau, a Chinese-American psychiatrist who left mainland China during the Cultural Revolution after serving a six-year forced labor sentence. In his writings, Chau claimed Chinese, Irish, African, Southeast Asian, and Choctaw ancestry.

Chau grew up in Vancouver, Washington, and attended Vancouver Christian High School. He later attended Oral Roberts University in Oklahoma, where he managed the university soccer team, and graduated cum laude in 2014 with a Bachelor of Science in exercise science.

== Contact with Sentinelese and death ==
Chau became interested in attempting to convert the Sentinelese to Christianity in high school, calling it "his burden" in 2017. He admired numerous explorers and missionaries, including David Livingstone and Bruce Olson. Before 2018, Chau had participated in missionary trips to Mexico, Israel, and Iraq. As part of these trips, Chau traveled to the Andaman Islands in 2015 and 2016, but did not visit North Sentinel Island at that time. In 2017, Chau participated in boot camp–style missionary training by the Kansas City–based evangelical organization All Nations. According to a report by The New York Times, the training included navigating a mock native village populated by missionary staff members who pretended to be hostile natives, wielding fake spears.

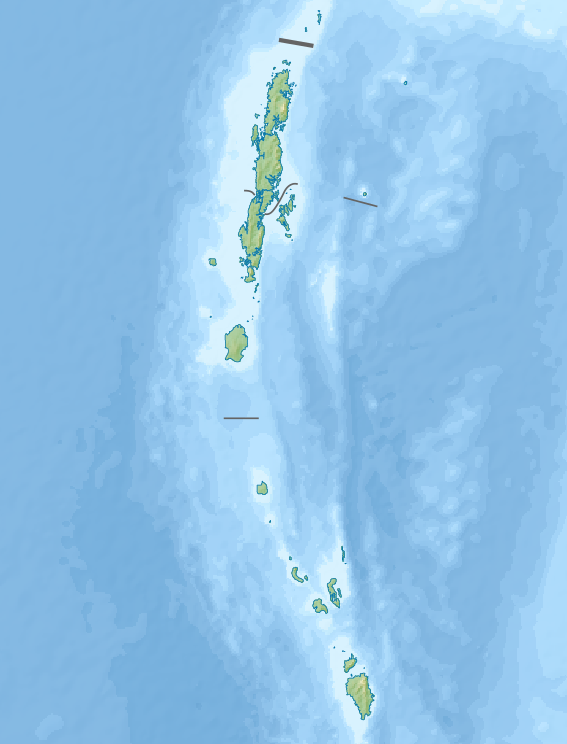
Main locations visited by Chau in the Andaman and Nicobar Islands

In October 2018, Chau established a residence at Port Blair, capital of the Andaman and Nicobar Islands, where he prepared an initial contact kit including picture cards for communication, gifts for the Sentinelese people, medical equipment, and other necessities. Earlier that year in August, the Indian Ministry of Home Affairs removed 29 inhabited islands in Andaman and Nicobar from the Restricted Area Permit regime, in an attempt to promote tourism. However, visiting North Sentinel Island without government permission remained illegal under the Andaman and Nicobar Islands (Protection of Aboriginal Tribes) Regulation, 1956.

In November, Chau embarked on a journey to North Sentinel Island, asking in his diary if it could be "Satan's last stronghold on Earth", with the aim of contacting and living among the Sentinelese. In preparation for the trip he was vaccinated and quarantined, and also undertook medical and linguistic training. Chau paid two fishermen ₹25,000 (equivalent to ₹36,000 or US$390 in 2026) to take him near the island. The fishermen were later arrested.

On November 15, Chau attempted his first visit in a fishing boat, which took him about 500 meters (1,600 ft) from shore. The fishermen warned Chau not to go farther, but he canoed toward shore with a waterproof Bible. As he approached, he attempted to communicate with the Sentinelese and offer gifts, but retreated after facing hostile responses.

On another visit, Chau remarked that the Sentinelese had again acted hostile, but had also shown amusement and curiosity. He sang Christian hymns to them from his canoe and tried communicating in Xhosa, after which they often became quiet. Other attempts to communicate such as echoing the tribesmen's words ended with them bursting into laughter, making Chau theorize that they had been cursing at him. Chau stated they communicated with "lots of high-pitched sounds" and gestures. In what would be his last letter, Chau described a later attempt at contact, during which a Sentinelese boy had fired a metal-tipped arrow which pierced the Bible he was holding against his chest, forcing him to withdraw once more.

On what became his final visit on November 17, Chau told the fishermen once again bringing him to the island to leave without him. Sometime during this visit, Chau was fatally shot by Sentinelese arrows. The fishermen later reported seeing the Sentinelese drag his body and, the next day, bury him on the beach.

=== Aftermath ===
Upon learning about Chau's death, the fishermen returned to Port Blair and gave Chau's diary to his friend, a Christian preacher, residing in the city. He informed Chau's family in the U.S., who contacted the Consulate General of the United States in Chennai for assistance. The Andaman administration was notified on November 19. On November 21, the Director General of Police issued a statement on the restrictions on public access to North Sentinel Island.

Indian officials made several attempts to recover the body but eventually abandoned those efforts. An anthropologist involved in the attempts remarked the likelihood of a violent confrontation between recovery teams and the Sentinelese was too high to justify continuing the effort. A murder case was opened following his death.

The incident drew global attention from journalists. While some evangelical groups described Chau as a martyr, the vast majority of media negatively described Chau's visits. Organizations such as Survival International, among others, criticized Chau for visiting the island because of the risk of introducing pathogens to the native Sentinelese. Possible pathogens could have been deadly, as native Sentinelese were unlikely to have been previously exposed to diseases from outside the island. Chau's father also blamed his son's death on the missionary community for instilling what he believed was an extreme Christian vision in Chau.

== Analysis and legacy ==
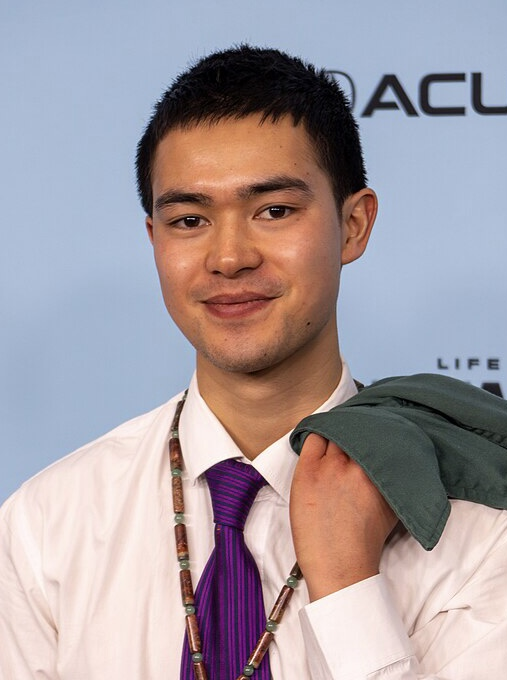
British actor Sky Yang played the part of Chau in the 2025 American biographical drama film Last Days.

In response to Chau's death, Mundayat Sasikumar of the Maulana Abul Kalam Azad Institute of Asian Studies questioned the legal charge of murder and what he perceived as "half-truths in the absence of objective facts about the community" by the media. He wrote that the incident should instead serve as a warning that the "hands-off, eyes-on" policy with regard to the Sentinelese needs to be more strictly enforced, and be extended to leverage on the local fishermen in order to prevent additional incidents.

Michael Schönhuth, professor at the University of Trier, Germany, explored the media response to Chau's killing from a standpoint of cultural anthropology. He wrote that the narratives that emerged were part of a larger discussion regarding the proper relationship between the modern world and the remaining isolated indigenous peoples, and that state sanctioning of controlled, responsible contacts with isolated people groups such as the Sentinelese still remains a subject of heavy debate, even among experts. By contrast, uncontrolled, privately organized contact, as in the case of Chau, is forbidden due to the significant risk of lethal infections against the unprotected immune system of isolated communities.

The 2023 National Geographic documentary film The Mission explores Chau's life. Last Days, a drama film by Justin Lin about Chau, was released in 2025, with Sky Yang portraying Chau.

== See also ==
- Christian mission
- Evangelism
- Great Commission
- North Sentinel Island § Indian Ocean earthquake and later hostile contacts
