= List of awards and nominations received by The West Wing =

Awards and nominations received by The West Wing
Awards and nominations
Award	Wins	Nominations
ACE Eddie Awards	1	4
ADG Excellence in Production Design Awards	1	2
ALMA Awards	3	5
American Academy of Neurology Awards	1	1
American Film Institute Awards	2	4
American Society of Cinematographers Awards	2	6
Artios Awards	2	4
Banff Rockie Awards	1	1
BMI Film & TV Awards	6	6
Cinema Audio Society Awards	2	4
Costume Designers Guild Awards	0	1
Directors Guild of America Awards	3	9
E Pluribus Unum Awards	0	1
Emmy Awards	27	98
Environmental Media Awards	2	3
Family Television Awards	2	2
GLAAD Media Awards	1	1
Golden Globe Awards	2	20
Golden Nymph Awards	2	2
Golden Reel Awards	0	5
Hollywood Critics Association TV Awards	0	1
Humanitas Prize	3	5
ICG Publicists Awards	1	1
Imagen Awards	4	7
Make-Up Artists & Hair Stylists Guild Awards	0	1
NAACP Image Awards	0	6
Peabody Awards	2	2
People's Choice Awards	0	2
PRISM Awards	2	8
Producers Guild of America Awards	4	8
Quality Awards	3	5
Satellite Awards	5	10
Screen Actors Guild Awards	6	20
Television Critics Association Awards	5	12
TV Guide Awards	3	8
Writers Guild of America Awards	2	12
Young Artist Awards	0	2

Totals (Note: Certain award groups do not simply award one winner. They acknowledge several different recipients, have runners-up, and have third place. Since this is a specific recognition and is different from losing an award, runner-up mentions are considered wins in this award tally. For simplification and to avoid errors, each award in this list has been presumed to have had a prior nomination.)
- Wins: 100
- Nominations: 289

The West Wing is an American political drama television series created by Aaron Sorkin and produced by John Wells Productions and Warner Bros. Television. It originally aired on NBC from September 22, 1999, to May 14, 2006, broadcasting 156 episodes over seven seasons. A special episode was also released on October 15, 2020, on HBO Max.

The show follows the lives of White House staffers during the fictional Democratic presidential administration of Josiah Bartlet. The show originally starred Rob Lowe as Sam Seaborn, Moira Kelly as Mandy Hampton, Allison Janney as C. J. Cregg, Richard Schiff as Toby Ziegler, John Spencer as Leo McGarry, Bradley Whitford as Josh Lyman, and Martin Sheen as Bartlet. Over the course of the show's run, the main cast added Dulé Hill as Charlie Young, Janel Moloney as Donna Moss, Stockard Channing as Abbey Bartlet, Joshua Malina as Will Bailey, Mary McCormack as Kate Harper, Jimmy Smits as Matt Santos, Alan Alda as Arnold Vinick, and Kristin Chenoweth as Annabeth Schott.

Overall, the show won 100 awards from 289 nominations, including 27 Primetime Emmy Awards from 98 nominations. (Note: The Emmys website officially lists 26 wins from 95 nominations for The West Wing. This total does not include The West Wing Documentary Special, which won one Emmy, or A West Wing Special to Benefit When We All Vote, which was nominated for two Emmys. Both have been included in the list below.) It was nominated for the Primetime Emmy Award for Outstanding Drama Series for all seven seasons it aired and won in each of its first four seasons; it is tied for the record for most wins in the category. By the end of its run, it was tied with Hill Street Blues for the most Emmys won by a drama series, a record later surpassed by Game of Thrones. The show also won nine Emmys for its first season, setting a record for most Emmys won by a series in one year that stood until Game of Thrones earned twelve Emmys in 2015. In addition, it won two Golden Globe Awards, three Directors Guild of America Awards, four Producers Guild of America Awards, six Screen Actors Guild Awards, and two Writers Guild of America Awards, among others. The series also received two Peabody Awards in 1999 and 2000.

Many cast members received individual recognition for their performances. Janney received two Emmy awards for Supporting Actress and two for Lead Actress, as well as a Satellite Award and two Screen Actors Guild Awards for her performance. Sheen won a Golden Globe Award, a Satellite Award, and two Screen Actors Guild Awards, while Schiff, Whitford, Spencer, Channing, and Alda each won an Emmy for their supporting roles. As a whole, the cast won two Screen Actors Guild Awards for Outstanding Performance by an Ensemble in a Drama Series and a Satellite Award for Outstanding Television Ensemble.

== Awards and nominations ==
Awards and nominations received by The West Wing
Award	Year	Category	Nominee(s)	Result	Ref.
ACE Eddie Awards	1999	Best Edited One-Hour Series for Television	Christopher Nelson (for "Pilot")	Nominated	
ACE Eddie Awards	2000	Best Edited One-Hour Series for Television	Tina Hirsch (for "What Kind of Day Has It Been")	Won	
ACE Eddie Awards	2002	Best Edited One-Hour Series for Television	Janet Ashikaga (for "Election Night")	Nominated	
ACE Eddie Awards	2003	Best Edited One-Hour Series for Television	Janet Ashikaga (for "Twenty Five")	Nominated	
ADG Excellence in Production Design Awards	1999	Excellence in Production Design for a Television Series	Jon Hutman and Tony Fanning (for "Pilot")	Won	
ADG Excellence in Production Design Awards	2001	Excellence in Production Design in Television, Single Camera Series	Kenneth Hardy	Nominated	
ALMA Awards	2000	Outstanding Actor in a Television Series	Martin Sheen	Nominated	
ALMA Awards	2001	Outstanding Actor in a Television Series	Martin Sheen	Won	
ALMA Awards	2002	Outstanding Actor in a Television Series	Martin Sheen	Nominated	
ALMA Awards	2006	Outstanding Television Series	The West Wing	Won	
ALMA Awards	2006	Outstanding Actor in a Television Series	Jimmy Smits	Won	
American Academy of Neurology Awards	2002	Public Leadership in Neurology Award	The West Wing	Won	
American Film Institute Awards	2001	Drama Series of the Year	The West Wing	Nominated	
American Film Institute Awards	2001	Actor of the Year — Female — TV Series	Allison Janney	Nominated	
American Film Institute Awards	2002	Television Program of the Year	The West Wing	Won (Note: All nominees in the category are recognized.)	
American Film Institute Awards	2006	Television Program of the Year	The West Wing	Won	
American Society of Cinematographers Awards	1999	Outstanding Achievement in Cinematography in a Movie of the Week, Miniseries or Pilot	Thomas Del Ruth (for "Pilot")	Nominated	
American Society of Cinematographers Awards	2000	Outstanding Achievement in Cinematography in Regular Series	Thomas Del Ruth (for "Noël")	Won	
American Society of Cinematographers Awards	2001	Outstanding Achievement in Cinematography in Regular Series	Thomas Del Ruth (for "Bartlet for America")	Won	
American Society of Cinematographers Awards	2002	Outstanding Achievement in Cinematography in Regular Series	Thomas Del Ruth (for "Holy Night")	Nominated	
American Society of Cinematographers Awards	2003	Outstanding Achievement in Cinematography in Regular Series	Thomas Del Ruth (for "7A WF 83429")	Nominated	
American Society of Cinematographers Awards	2004	Outstanding Achievement in Cinematography in Regular Series	Thomas Del Ruth (for "Gaza")	Nominated	
Artios Awards	2000	Dramatic Pilot Casting	John Levey, Jeff Block, and Barbara Miller	Won	
Artios Awards	2000	Dramatic Episodic Casting	John Levey, Jeff Block, and Barbara Miller	Nominated	
Artios Awards	2001	Dramatic Episodic Casting	John Levey, Kevin Scott, and Barbara Miller	Won	
Artios Awards	2002	Dramatic Episodic Casting	Anthony Sepulveda and Barbara Miller	Nominated	
Banff Rockie Awards	2003	Best Continuing Series	The West Wing	Won	
BMI Awards	2000	BMI TV Music Award	W. G. Snuffy Walden (Note: Shared with Providence and The Drew Carey Show)	Won	
BMI Awards	2001	BMI TV Music Award	W. G. Snuffy Walden (Note: Shared with The Drew Carey Show)	Won	
BMI Awards	2002	BMI TV Music Award	W. G. Snuffy Walden (Note: Shared with Providence)	Won	
BMI Awards	2003	BMI TV Music Award	W. G. Snuffy Walden (Note: Shared with Providence)	Won	
BMI Awards	2004	BMI TV Music Award	W. G. Snuffy Walden	Won	
BMI Awards	2005	BMI TV Music Award	W. G. Snuffy Walden	Won	
Cinema Audio Society Awards	1999	Outstanding Achievement in Sound Mixing for Television Series	Gary D. Rogers, Dan Hiland, and Kenneth B. Ross (for "In Excelsis Deo")	Nominated	
Cinema Audio Society Awards	2000	Outstanding Achievement in Sound Mixing for Television Series	Dan Hiland, Gary D. Rogers, and Mark Weingarten (for "In the Shadow of Two Gunmen")	Won	
Cinema Audio Society Awards	2002	Outstanding Achievement in Sound Mixing for Television Series	Dan Hiland, Gary D. Rogers, and Patrick Hanson (for "Posse Comitatus")	Won	
Cinema Audio Society Awards	2005	Outstanding Achievement in Sound Mixing for Television Series	Dan Hiland, Gary D. Rogers, and Patrick Hanson (for "2162 Votes")	Nominated	
Costume Designers Guild Awards	2000	Excellence in Costume Design Contemporary for Television	Lyn Paolo	Nominated	
Directors Guild of America Awards	1999	Outstanding Directorial Achievement in Dramatic Series	Thomas Schlamme (for "Pilot")	Nominated	
Directors Guild of America Awards	2000	Outstanding Directorial Achievement in Dramatic Series	Paris Barclay (for "The Portland Trip")	Nominated	
Directors Guild of America Awards	2000	Outstanding Directorial Achievement in Dramatic Series	Thomas Schlamme (for "Noël")	Won	
Directors Guild of America Awards	2001	Outstanding Directorial Achievement in Dramatic Series	Paris Barclay (for "The Indians in the Lobby")	Nominated	
Directors Guild of America Awards	2001	Outstanding Directorial Achievement in Dramatic Series	Thomas Schlamme (for "Two Cathedrals")	Nominated	
Directors Guild of America Awards	2002	Outstanding Directorial Achievement in Dramatic Series	Paris Barclay (for "Debate Camp")	Nominated	
Directors Guild of America Awards	2002	Outstanding Directorial Achievement in Dramatic Series	Alex Graves (for "Posse Comitatus")	Nominated	
Directors Guild of America Awards	2003	Outstanding Directorial Achievement in Dramatic Series	Christopher Misiano (for "Twenty Five") (Note: Additional nominees: Dylan Massin (unit production manager), Douglas Ornstein (first assistant director), Catherine Bond (second assistant director), and Cary Jones (second second assistant director))	Won	
Directors Guild of America Awards	2020	Outstanding Directorial Achievement in Variety/Talk/News/Sports – Specials	Thomas Schlamme (for A West Wing Special to Benefit When We All Vote) (Note: Additional nominees: Debra James (unit production manager), Shawn Pipkin-West (first assistant director), Courtney Franklin (second assistant director), and Ni'cole Pettis and Cathy Bond (second second assistant directors))	Won	
E Pluribus Unum Awards	2000	Television Series — Drama	The West Wing	Nominated	
Environmental Media Awards	2003	Episodic Television — Drama	"Privateers"	Won	
Environmental Media Awards	2004	Episodic Television — Drama	"Constituency of One"	Nominated	
Environmental Media Awards	2005	Episodic Television — Drama	"The Hubbert Peak"	Won	
Family Television Awards	2000	Drama	The West Wing	Won	
Family Television Awards	2001	Drama	The West Wing	Won	
GLAAD Media Awards	2001	Special Recognition Award	The West Wing	Won	
Golden Globe Awards	1999	Best Television Series – Drama	The West Wing	Nominated	
Golden Globe Awards	1999	Best Actor – Television Series Drama	Rob Lowe	Nominated	
Golden Globe Awards	1999	Best Actor – Television Series Drama	Martin Sheen	Nominated	
Golden Globe Awards	2000	Best Television Series – Drama	The West Wing	Won	
Golden Globe Awards	2000	Best Actor – Television Series Drama	Rob Lowe	Nominated (Note: While the Golden Globes website lists Lowe as a winner, other articles from the time only name Sheen.)	
Golden Globe Awards	2000	Best Actor – Television Series Drama	Martin Sheen	Won	
Golden Globe Awards	2000	Best Supporting Actor – Series, Miniseries or Television Film	Bradley Whitford	Nominated	
Golden Globe Awards	2000	Best Supporting Actress – Series, Miniseries or Television Film	Allison Janney	Nominated	
Golden Globe Awards	2001	Best Television Series – Drama	The West Wing	Nominated	
Golden Globe Awards	2001	Best Actor – Television Series Drama	Martin Sheen	Nominated	
Golden Globe Awards	2001	Best Supporting Actor – Series, Miniseries or Television Film	Bradley Whitford	Nominated	
Golden Globe Awards	2001	Best Supporting Actress – Series, Miniseries or Television Film	Allison Janney	Nominated	
Golden Globe Awards	2002	Best Television Series – Drama	The West Wing	Nominated	
Golden Globe Awards	2002	Best Actor – Television Series Drama	Martin Sheen	Nominated	
Golden Globe Awards	2002	Best Actress – Television Series Drama	Allison Janney	Nominated	
Golden Globe Awards	2002	Best Supporting Actor – Series, Miniseries or Television Film	John Spencer	Nominated	
Golden Globe Awards	2002	Best Supporting Actor – Series, Miniseries or Television Film	Bradley Whitford	Nominated	
Golden Globe Awards	2003	Best Television Series – Drama	The West Wing	Nominated	
Golden Globe Awards	2003	Best Actor – Television Series Drama	Martin Sheen	Nominated	
Golden Globe Awards	2003	Best Actress – Television Series Drama	Allison Janney	Nominated	
Golden Nymph Awards	2002	Outstanding Producer of the Year — Drama	John Wells, Aaron Sorkin, Thomas Schlamme, Llewellyn Wells, Christopher Misiano, Alex Graves, and Michael Hissrich	Won	
Golden Nymph Awards	2003	Outstanding Actress of the Year — Drama	Allison Janney	Won	
Golden Reel Awards	2000	Best Sound Editing in Television Series — Dialogue and Automated Dialogue Replacement	Walter Newman, Thomas A. Harris, Catherine Flynn, and Jessica Dickson (for "What Kind of Day Has It Been")	Nominated	
Golden Reel Awards	2001	Best Sound Editing in Television: Episodic Dialogue/ADR	Walter Newman, Catherine Flynn, Thomas A. Harris, Jennifer Mertens, Eric Hertsgaard, and Karen Spangenberg (for "Manchester", Part II)	Nominated	
Golden Reel Awards	2002	Best Sound Editing in Television: Episodic Dialogue/ADR	Walter Newman, Catherine Flynn, Thomas A. Harris, Constance A. Kazmer, Karen Spangenberg, and Denise Horta (for "Game On")	Nominated	
Golden Reel Awards	2003	Best Sound Editing in Television: Episodic Dialogue/ADR	Walter Newman, Thomas A. Harris, Catherine Flynn, Karyn Foster, and Gabrielle Reeves (for "Twenty Five")	Nominated	
Golden Reel Awards	2005	Best Sound Editing in Television: Short Form — Dialogue and Automated Dialogue Replacement	Walter Newman, Thomas A. Harris, Catherine Flynn, Virginia Cook, and Steffan Falesitch (for "The Ticket")	Nominated	
Hollywood Critics Association TV Awards	2021	Best Streaming Sketch Series, Variety Series, Talk Show, or Comedy/Variety Special	A West Wing Special to Benefit When We All Vote	Nominated	
Humanitas Prize	2000	60 Minute Category	Aaron Sorkin and Rick Cleveland (for "In Excelsis Deo")	Nominated	
Humanitas Prize	2000	60 Minute Category	Aaron Sorkin, Lawrence O'Donnell Jr., and Paul Redford (for "Take This Sabbath Day")	Won	
Humanitas Prize	2002	60 Minute Category	Aaron Sorkin (for "Two Cathedrals")	Won (Note: Tied with "Honor Code" from The Practice)	
Humanitas Prize	2005	60 Minute Category	John Wells (for "NSF Thurmont")	Won	
Humanitas Prize	2007	60 Minute Category	Eli Attie and John Wells (for "Election Day", Part II)	Nominated	
ICG Publicists Awards	2000	Maxwell Weinberg Publicist Showmanship Award — Television	Warner Bros. Television	Won	
Imagen Awards	2000	Best Primetime Television Drama	The West Wing	Won	
Imagen Awards	2001	Best Primetime Drama Series	The West Wing (Note: The episode "The War at Home" was submitted for the show's nomination.)	Nominated	
Imagen Awards	2002	Best Primetime TV Series, Drama	The West Wing	Nominated	
Imagen Awards	2005	Best Primetime Series	The West Wing	Won	
Imagen Awards	2005	Best Actor — Television	Jimmy Smits	Won	
Imagen Awards	2006	Best Primetime Series	The West Wing	Won	
Imagen Awards	2006	Best Actor — Television	Jimmy Smits	Nominated	
Make-Up Artists and Hair Stylists Guild Awards	2001	Best Contemporary Hair Styling — Television (For a Single Episode of a Regular Series — Sitcom, Drama or Daytime)	The West Wing (Note: The specific nominees for this award are not available in reliable sources, though an article from the Make-Up Artists and Hair Stylists Guild implies that Jeffrey Sacino and John Damiani received a nomination for an unspecified episode.)	Nominated	
NAACP Image Awards	2000	Outstanding Supporting Actor in a Drama Series	Dulé Hill	Nominated	
NAACP Image Awards	2001	Outstanding Supporting Actor in a Drama Series	Dulé Hill	Nominated	
NAACP Image Awards	2002	Outstanding Supporting Actress in a Drama Series	Anna Deavere Smith	Nominated	
NAACP Image Awards	2003	Outstanding Supporting Actor in a Drama Series	Dulé Hill	Nominated	
NAACP Image Awards	2003	Outstanding Supporting Actress in a Drama Series	Anna Deavere Smith	Nominated	
NAACP Image Awards	2004	Outstanding Supporting Actor in a Drama Series	Dulé Hill	Nominated	
Peabody Awards	1999	Recipient	The West Wing (Note: Presented to NBC and John Wells Productions in association with Warner Bros. Television)	Won	
Peabody Awards	2000	Recipient	The West Wing	Won	
People's Choice Awards	2000	Favorite Drama Series	The West Wing	Nominated	
People's Choice Awards	2001	Favorite Drama Series	The West Wing	Nominated	
Primetime Emmy Awards	2000	Outstanding Drama Series	Aaron Sorkin, Thomas Schlamme, John Wells, Kristin Harms, and Llewellyn Wells	Won	
Primetime Emmy Awards	2000	Outstanding Lead Actor in a Drama Series	Martin Sheen	Nominated	
Primetime Emmy Awards	2000	Outstanding Supporting Actor in a Drama Series	Richard Schiff	Won	
Primetime Emmy Awards	2000	Outstanding Supporting Actor in a Drama Series	John Spencer	Nominated	
Primetime Emmy Awards	2000	Outstanding Supporting Actress in a Drama Series	Stockard Channing	Nominated	
Primetime Emmy Awards	2000	Outstanding Supporting Actress in a Drama Series	Allison Janney	Won	
Primetime Emmy Awards	2000	Outstanding Directing for a Drama Series	Thomas Schlamme (for "Pilot")	Won	
Primetime Emmy Awards	2000	Outstanding Writing for a Drama Series	Aaron Sorkin (for "Pilot")	Nominated	
Primetime Emmy Awards	2000	Outstanding Writing for a Drama Series	Aaron Sorkin and Rick Cleveland (for "In Excelsis Deo")	Won	
Primetime Emmy Awards	2001	Outstanding Drama Series	Aaron Sorkin, Thomas Schlamme, John Wells, Kevin Falls, Michael Hissrich, Lawrence O'Donnell Jr., Kristin Harms, and Llewellyn Wells	Won	
Primetime Emmy Awards	2001	Outstanding Lead Actor in a Drama Series	Rob Lowe	Nominated	
Primetime Emmy Awards	2001	Outstanding Lead Actor in a Drama Series	Martin Sheen	Nominated	
Primetime Emmy Awards	2001	Outstanding Supporting Actor in a Drama Series	Richard Schiff	Nominated	
Primetime Emmy Awards	2001	Outstanding Supporting Actor in a Drama Series	John Spencer	Nominated	
Primetime Emmy Awards	2001	Outstanding Supporting Actor in a Drama Series	Bradley Whitford	Won	
Primetime Emmy Awards	2001	Outstanding Supporting Actress in a Drama Series	Stockard Channing	Nominated	
Primetime Emmy Awards	2001	Outstanding Supporting Actress in a Drama Series	Allison Janney	Won	
Primetime Emmy Awards	2001	Outstanding Directing for a Drama Series	Laura Innes (for "Shibboleth")	Nominated	
Primetime Emmy Awards	2001	Outstanding Directing for a Drama Series	Thomas Schlamme (for "In the Shadow of Two Gunmen", Parts I and II)	Won	
Primetime Emmy Awards	2001	Outstanding Writing for a Drama Series	Aaron Sorkin (for "In the Shadow of Two Gunmen", Parts I and II)	Nominated	
Primetime Emmy Awards	2002	Outstanding Drama Series	Aaron Sorkin, Thomas Schlamme, John Wells, Kevin Falls, Christopher Misiano, Alex Graves, Llewellyn Wells, Michael Hissrich, and Kristin Harms	Won	
Primetime Emmy Awards	2002	Outstanding Lead Actor in a Drama Series	Martin Sheen	Nominated	
Primetime Emmy Awards	2002	Outstanding Lead Actress in a Drama Series	Allison Janney	Won	
Primetime Emmy Awards	2002	Outstanding Supporting Actor in a Drama Series	Dulé Hill	Nominated	
Primetime Emmy Awards	2002	Outstanding Supporting Actor in a Drama Series	Richard Schiff	Nominated	
Primetime Emmy Awards	2002	Outstanding Supporting Actor in a Drama Series	John Spencer	Won	
Primetime Emmy Awards	2002	Outstanding Supporting Actor in a Drama Series	Bradley Whitford	Nominated	
Primetime Emmy Awards	2002	Outstanding Supporting Actress in a Drama Series	Stockard Channing	Won	
Primetime Emmy Awards	2002	Outstanding Supporting Actress in a Drama Series	Janel Moloney	Nominated	
Primetime Emmy Awards	2002	Outstanding Supporting Actress in a Drama Series	Mary-Louise Parker	Nominated	
Primetime Emmy Awards	2002	Outstanding Directing for a Drama Series	Paris Barclay (for "The Indians in the Lobby")	Nominated	
Primetime Emmy Awards	2002	Outstanding Directing for a Drama Series	Alex Graves (for "Posse Comitatus")	Nominated	
Primetime Emmy Awards	2002	Outstanding Writing for a Drama Series	Aaron Sorkin (for "Posse Comitatus")	Nominated	
Primetime Emmy Awards	2003	Outstanding Drama Series	Aaron Sorkin, Thomas Schlamme, John Wells, Christopher Misiano, Alex Graves, Kevin Falls, Llewellyn Wells, Paul Redford, Kristin Harms, and Neal Ahern Jr.	Won	
Primetime Emmy Awards	2003	Outstanding Lead Actor in a Drama Series	Martin Sheen	Nominated	
Primetime Emmy Awards	2003	Outstanding Lead Actress in a Drama Series	Allison Janney	Nominated	
Primetime Emmy Awards	2003	Outstanding Supporting Actor in a Drama Series	John Spencer	Nominated	
Primetime Emmy Awards	2003	Outstanding Supporting Actor in a Drama Series	Bradley Whitford	Nominated	
Primetime Emmy Awards	2003	Outstanding Supporting Actress in a Drama Series	Stockard Channing	Nominated	
Primetime Emmy Awards	2003	Outstanding Directing for a Drama Series	Christopher Misiano (for "Twenty Five")	Won	
Primetime Emmy Awards	2003	Outstanding Writing for a Drama Series	Aaron Sorkin (for "Twenty Five")	Nominated	
Primetime Emmy Awards	2004	Outstanding Drama Series	John Wells, Christopher Misiano, Llewellyn Wells, Alex Graves, Paul Redford, Carol Flint, Alexa Junge, Peter Noah, John Sacret Young, Kristin Harms, Andrew Stearn, and Eli Attie	Nominated	
Primetime Emmy Awards	2004	Outstanding Lead Actor in a Drama Series	Martin Sheen	Nominated	
Primetime Emmy Awards	2004	Outstanding Lead Actress in a Drama Series	Allison Janney	Won	
Primetime Emmy Awards	2004	Outstanding Supporting Actor in a Drama Series	John Spencer	Nominated	
Primetime Emmy Awards	2004	Outstanding Supporting Actress in a Drama Series	Stockard Channing	Nominated	
Primetime Emmy Awards	2004	Outstanding Supporting Actress in a Drama Series	Janel Moloney	Nominated	
Primetime Emmy Awards	2005	Outstanding Drama Series	John Wells, Christopher Misiano, Alex Graves, Carol Flint, Peter Noah, John Sacret Young, Eli Attie, Kristin Harms, Andrew Stearn, and Michael Hissrich	Nominated	
Primetime Emmy Awards	2005	Outstanding Supporting Actor in a Drama Series	Alan Alda	Nominated	
Primetime Emmy Awards	2005	Outstanding Supporting Actress in a Drama Series	Stockard Channing	Nominated	
Primetime Emmy Awards	2005	Outstanding Directing for a Drama Series	Alex Graves (for "2162 Votes")	Nominated	
Primetime Emmy Awards	2006	Outstanding Drama Series	John Wells, Christopher Misiano, Alex Graves, Lawrence O'Donnell Jr., Peter Noah, Eli Attie, Andrew Stearn, Debora Cahn, Patrick Ward, Kristin Harms, and Michael Hissrich	Nominated	
Primetime Emmy Awards	2006	Outstanding Lead Actor in a Drama Series	Martin Sheen	Nominated	
Primetime Emmy Awards	2006	Outstanding Lead Actress in a Drama Series	Allison Janney	Nominated	
Primetime Emmy Awards	2006	Outstanding Supporting Actor in a Drama Series	Alan Alda	Won	
Primetime Emmy Awards	2006	Outstanding Directing for a Drama Series	Mimi Leder (for "Election Day")	Nominated	
Primetime Emmy Awards	2021	Outstanding Variety Special (Pre-Recorded)	Casey Patterson, Thomas Schlamme, Aaron Sorkin, Rob Paine, and Brittany Mehmedovic (for A West Wing Special to Benefit When We All Vote)	Nominated	
Primetime Creative Arts Emmy Awards	2000	Outstanding Art Direction for a Single-Camera Series	Jon Hutman, Tony Fanning, and Ellen Totleben (for "Pilot")	Won	
Primetime Creative Arts Emmy Awards	2000	Outstanding Casting for a Drama Series	Barbara Miller, John Levey, and Kevin Scott	Won	
Primetime Creative Arts Emmy Awards	2000	Outstanding Cinematography for a Single-Camera Series	Thomas Del Ruth (for "Pilot")	Won	
Primetime Creative Arts Emmy Awards	2000	Outstanding Costumes for a Series	Lyn Elizabeth Paolo and Alice Daniels (for "The State Dinner")	Nominated	
Primetime Creative Arts Emmy Awards	2000	Outstanding Main Title Design	Billy Pittard Johnston and Mark Johnston	Nominated	
Primetime Creative Arts Emmy Awards	2000	Outstanding Main Title Theme Music	W. G. Snuffy Walden	Won	
Primetime Creative Arts Emmy Awards	2000	Outstanding Single-Camera Picture Editing for a Series	Tina Hirsch (for "What Kind of Day Has It Been")	Nominated	
Primetime Creative Arts Emmy Awards	2000	Outstanding Single-Camera Picture Editing for a Series	Bill Johnson (for "In Excelsis Deo")	Nominated	
Primetime Creative Arts Emmy Awards	2000	Outstanding Sound Mixing for a Drama Series	Kenneth B. Ross, Len Schmitz, Dan Hiland, and Gary D. Rogers (for "In Excelsis Deo")	Nominated	
Primetime Creative Arts Emmy Awards	2001	Outstanding Art Direction for a Single-Camera Series	Ken Hardy and Ellen Totleben (for "Noël")	Nominated	
Primetime Creative Arts Emmy Awards	2001	Outstanding Casting for a Drama Series	Kevin Scott, John Levey, and Barbara Miller	Won	
Primetime Creative Arts Emmy Awards	2001	Outstanding Cinematography for a Single-Camera Series	Thomas Del Ruth (for "Noël")	Won	
Primetime Creative Arts Emmy Awards	2001	Outstanding Guest Actor in a Drama Series	Oliver Platt	Nominated	
Primetime Creative Arts Emmy Awards	2001	Outstanding Music Composition for a Series (Dramatic Underscore)	W. G. Snuffy Walden (for "In the Shadow of Two Gunmen")	Nominated	
Primetime Creative Arts Emmy Awards	2001	Outstanding Single-Camera Picture Editing for a Series	Bill Johnson (for "Two Cathedrals")	Won	
Primetime Creative Arts Emmy Awards	2001	Outstanding Single-Camera Sound Mixing for a Series	Mark Weingarten, Gary D. Rogers, and Dan Hiland (for "In the Shadow of Two Gunmen", Part II)	Won	
Primetime Creative Arts Emmy Awards	2002	Outstanding Art Direction for a Single-Camera Series	Ken Hardy and Ellen Totleben (for "Manchester", Part II)	Nominated	
Primetime Creative Arts Emmy Awards	2002	Outstanding Casting for a Drama Series	Anthony Sepulveda and Barbara Miller	Nominated	
Primetime Creative Arts Emmy Awards	2002	Outstanding Cinematography for a Single-Camera Series	Thomas Del Ruth (for "Bartlet for America")	Nominated	
Primetime Creative Arts Emmy Awards	2002	Outstanding Guest Actor in a Drama Series	Mark Harmon	Nominated	
Primetime Creative Arts Emmy Awards	2002	Outstanding Guest Actor in a Drama Series	Tim Matheson	Nominated	
Primetime Creative Arts Emmy Awards	2002	Outstanding Guest Actor in a Drama Series	Ron Silver	Nominated	
Primetime Creative Arts Emmy Awards	2002	Outstanding Single-Camera Picture Editing for a Series	Janet Ashikaga (for "100,000 Airplanes")	Nominated	
Primetime Creative Arts Emmy Awards	2002	Outstanding Single-Camera Picture Editing for a Series	Lauren Schaffer (for "Bartlet for America")	Nominated	
Primetime Creative Arts Emmy Awards	2002	Outstanding Special Class Program	Thomas Schlamme, John Wells, Aaron Sorkin, Kevin Falls, Michael Hissrich, Llewellyn Wells, Anne Sandkuhler, William Couturié, Eli Attie, and Felicia Willson (for The West Wing Documentary Special)	Won	
Primetime Creative Arts Emmy Awards	2003	Outstanding Art Direction for a Single-Camera Series	Ken Hardy and Ellen Totleben (for "20 Hours in America", Parts 1 and 2)	Nominated	
Primetime Creative Arts Emmy Awards	2003	Outstanding Casting for a Drama Series	Anthony Sepulveda and Barbara Miller	Nominated	
Primetime Creative Arts Emmy Awards	2003	Outstanding Cinematography for a Single-Camera Series	Thomas Del Ruth (for "Holy Night")	Nominated	
Primetime Creative Arts Emmy Awards	2003	Outstanding Guest Actor in a Drama Series	Tim Matheson	Nominated	
Primetime Creative Arts Emmy Awards	2003	Outstanding Guest Actor in a Drama Series	Matthew Perry	Nominated	
Primetime Creative Arts Emmy Awards	2003	Outstanding Single-Camera Picture Editing for a Drama Series	Janet Ashikaga (for "Twenty Five")	Nominated	
Primetime Creative Arts Emmy Awards	2003	Outstanding Single-Camera Sound Mixing for a Series	Gary D. Rogers, Dan Hiland, and Patrick Hanson (for "Twenty Five")	Nominated	
Primetime Creative Arts Emmy Awards	2004	Outstanding Art Direction for a Single-Camera Series	Ken Hardy and Ellen Totleben (for "Gaza")	Nominated	
Primetime Creative Arts Emmy Awards	2004	Outstanding Casting for a Drama Series	Laura Schiff	Nominated	
Primetime Creative Arts Emmy Awards	2004	Outstanding Cinematography for a Single-Camera Series	Thomas Del Ruth (for "7A WF 83429")	Nominated	
Primetime Creative Arts Emmy Awards	2004	Outstanding Guest Actor in a Drama Series	Matthew Perry	Nominated	
Primetime Creative Arts Emmy Awards	2004	Outstanding Sound Editing for a Series	Walter Newman, Tom Harris, Catherine Flynn, Rick M. Hromadka, Darren Wright, Gabrielle Reeves, Rick Hammel, David Werntz, Troy Harding, Mike Crabtree, and Casey Crabtree (for "An Khe")	Nominated	
Primetime Creative Arts Emmy Awards	2004	Outstanding Single-Camera Sound Mixing for a Series	Gary D. Rogers, Dan Hiland, and Patrick Hanson (for "Gaza")	Nominated	
Primetime Creative Arts Emmy Awards	2005	Outstanding Single-Camera Sound Mixing for a Series	Patrick Hanson, Gary D. Rogers, and Dan Hiland (for "2162 Votes")	Nominated	
Primetime Creative Arts Emmy Awards	2006	Outstanding Multi-Camera Sound Mixing for a Series or Special	Edward J. Greene and Andrew Stauber (for "The Debate")	Won	
Primetime Creative Arts Emmy Awards	2021	Outstanding Directing for a Variety Special	Thomas Schlamme (for A West Wing Special to Benefit When We All Vote)	Nominated	
PRISM Awards	2000	TV Primetime Drama Series Episode	"Five Votes Down"	Nominated (Note: Nominees that do not win receive PRISM Commendations)	
PRISM Awards	2001	TV Drama Series Episode	"Mandatory Minimums"	Nominated	
PRISM Awards	2001	TV Drama Series Episode	"The Portland Trip"	Nominated	
PRISM Awards	2002	TV Drama Series Episode	"Bartlet for America"	Nominated	
PRISM Awards	2002	TV Drama Series Episode	"18th and Potomac"	Nominated	
PRISM Awards	2003	TV Drama Series Episode	"Stirred"	Nominated	
PRISM Awards	2003	Performance in a Drama Series Episode	Tim Matheson	Won	
PRISM Awards	2003	Performance in a Drama Series Episode	John Spencer	Won	
Producers Guild of America Awards	1999	Best Episodic Television	John Wells, Aaron Sorkin and Thomas Schlamme	Nominated	
Producers Guild of America Awards	1999	Nova Award for Most Promising Producer — Television	Aaron Sorkin (Note: Shared with Sports Night)	Won	
Producers Guild of America Awards	1999	Vision Award — Television	John Wells (Note: Shared with ER and Third Watch)	Won	
Producers Guild of America Awards	2000	Best Episodic Drama	John Wells, Aaron Sorkin, Thomas Schlamme, Llewellyn Wells, and Michael Hissrich	Won	
Producers Guild of America Awards	2001	Best Episodic Drama	John Wells, Aaron Sorkin, Thomas Schlamme, Llewellyn Wells, Christopher Misiano, Alex Graves, and Michael Hissrich	Won	
Producers Guild of America Awards	2002	Best Episodic Drama	Aaron Sorkin, Thomas Schlamme, John Wells, Michael Hissrich, Alex Graves, Christopher Misiano, and Llewellyn Wells	Nominated	
Producers Guild of America Awards	2003	Best Episodic Drama	Aaron Sorkin, Thomas Schlamme, John Wells, Alex Graves, Christopher Misiano, Llewellyn Wells, and Neal Ahern Jr.	Nominated	
Producers Guild of America Awards	2004	Best Episodic Drama	John Wells, Alex Graves, Christopher Misiano, Llewellyn Wells, and Neal Ahern Jr.	Nominated	
Quality Awards	2000	Best Quality Drama Series	The West Wing	Won	
Quality Awards	2000	Best Actor in a Quality Drama Series	Martin Sheen	Won	
Quality Awards	2000	Best Supporting Actor in a Quality Drama Series	John Spencer	Won	
Quality Awards	2000	Best Supporting Actor in a Quality Drama Series	Bradley Whitford	Nominated	
Quality Awards	2000	Best Supporting Actress in a Quality Drama Series	Allison Janney	Nominated	
Satellite Awards	1999	Best Television Series, Drama	The West Wing	Won	
Satellite Awards	1999	Best Performance by an Actor in a Series, Drama	Martin Sheen	Won	
Satellite Awards	2000	Best Television Series, Drama	The West Wing	Won	
Satellite Awards	2000	Best Performance by an Actor in a Series, Drama	Martin Sheen	Nominated	
Satellite Awards	2000	Best Performance by an Actress in a Series, Drama	Allison Janney	Won	
Satellite Awards	2000	Outstanding Television Ensemble	The West Wing	Won	
Satellite Awards	2001	Best Television Series, Drama	The West Wing	Nominated	
Satellite Awards	2001	Best Performance by an Actor in a Series, Drama	Martin Sheen	Nominated	
Satellite Awards	2002	Best Performance by an Actor in a Series, Drama	Martin Sheen	Nominated	
Satellite Awards	2002	Best Performance by an Actress in a Series, Drama	Allison Janney	Nominated	
Screen Actors Guild Awards	1999	Outstanding Performance by a Male Actor in a Drama Series	Martin Sheen	Nominated	
Screen Actors Guild Awards	2000	Outstanding Performance by a Male Actor in a Drama Series	Martin Sheen	Won	
Screen Actors Guild Awards	2000	Outstanding Performance by a Female Actor in a Drama Series	Allison Janney	Won	
Screen Actors Guild Awards	2000	Outstanding Performance by an Ensemble in a Drama Series	Dulé Hill, Allison Janney, Moira Kelly, Rob Lowe, Janel Moloney, Richard Schiff, Martin Sheen, John Spencer, and Bradley Whitford	Won	
Screen Actors Guild Awards	2001	Outstanding Performance by a Male Actor in a Drama Series	Martin Sheen	Won	
Screen Actors Guild Awards	2001	Outstanding Performance by a Female Actor in a Drama Series	Stockard Channing	Nominated	
Screen Actors Guild Awards	2001	Outstanding Performance by a Female Actor in a Drama Series	Allison Janney	Won	
Screen Actors Guild Awards	2001	Outstanding Performance by an Ensemble in a Drama Series	Stockard Channing, Dulé Hill, Allison Janney, Rob Lowe, Janel Moloney, Richard Schiff, Martin Sheen, John Spencer, and Bradley Whitford	Won	
Screen Actors Guild Awards	2002	Outstanding Performance by a Male Actor in a Drama Series	Martin Sheen	Nominated	
Screen Actors Guild Awards	2002	Outstanding Performance by a Female Actor in a Drama Series	Allison Janney	Nominated	
Screen Actors Guild Awards	2002	Outstanding Performance by a Female Actor in a Drama Series	Lily Tomlin	Nominated	
Screen Actors Guild Awards	2002	Outstanding Performance by an Ensemble in a Drama Series	Stockard Channing, Dulé Hill, Allison Janney, Rob Lowe, Janel Moloney, Richard Schiff, Martin Sheen, John Spencer, and Bradley Whitford	Nominated	
Screen Actors Guild Awards	2003	Outstanding Performance by a Male Actor in a Drama Series	Martin Sheen	Nominated	
Screen Actors Guild Awards	2003	Outstanding Performance by a Female Actor in a Drama Series	Stockard Channing	Nominated	
Screen Actors Guild Awards	2003	Outstanding Performance by a Female Actor in a Drama Series	Allison Janney	Nominated	
Screen Actors Guild Awards	2003	Outstanding Performance by an Ensemble in a Drama Series	Stockard Channing, Dulé Hill, Allison Janney, Joshua Malina, Janel Moloney, Richard Schiff, Martin Sheen, John Spencer, and Bradley Whitford	Nominated	
Screen Actors Guild Awards	2004	Outstanding Performance by a Female Actor in a Drama Series	Allison Janney	Nominated	
Screen Actors Guild Awards	2004	Outstanding Performance by an Ensemble in a Drama Series	Stockard Channing, Kristin Chenoweth, Dulé Hill, Allison Janney, Joshua Malina, Mary McCormack, Janel Moloney, Richard Schiff, Martin Sheen, John Spencer, Lily Tomlin, and Bradley Whitford	Nominated	
Screen Actors Guild Awards	2005	Outstanding Performance by a Male Actor in a Drama Series	Alan Alda	Nominated	
Screen Actors Guild Awards	2005	Outstanding Performance by an Ensemble in a Drama Series	Alan Alda, Kristin Chenoweth, Janeane Garofalo, Dulé Hill, Allison Janney, Joshua Malina, Mary McCormack, Janel Moloney, Teri Polo, Richard Schiff, Martin Sheen, Jimmy Smits, John Spencer, and Bradley Whitford	Nominated	
Television Critics Association Awards	2000	Program of the Year	The West Wing	Won	
Television Critics Association Awards	2000	Outstanding Achievement in Drama	The West Wing	Won	
Television Critics Association Awards	2000	Outstanding New Program	The West Wing	Won	
Television Critics Association Awards	2000	Individual Achievement in Drama	Allison Janney	Nominated	
Television Critics Association Awards	2000	Individual Achievement in Drama	Martin Sheen	Nominated	
Television Critics Association Awards	2000	Individual Achievement in Drama	Aaron Sorkin	Nominated	
Television Critics Association Awards	2001	Program of the Year	The West Wing	Nominated	
Television Critics Association Awards	2001	Outstanding Achievement in Drama	The West Wing	Won (Note: Tied with The Sopranos)	
Television Critics Association Awards	2001	Individual Achievement in Drama	Martin Sheen	Nominated	
Television Critics Association Awards	2002	Individual Achievement in Drama	Martin Sheen	Nominated	
Television Critics Association Awards	2006	Individual Achievement in Drama	Alan Alda	Nominated	
Television Critics Association Awards	2006	Heritage Award	The West Wing	Won	
TV Guide Awards	2000	Favorite New Series	The West Wing	Nominated	
TV Guide Awards	2000	Favorite Actor in a New Series	Martin Sheen	Won	
TV Guide Awards	2001	Drama Series of the Year	The West Wing	Won	
TV Guide Awards	2001	Actor of the Year in a Drama Series	Martin Sheen	Won	
TV Guide Awards	2001	Actress of the Year in a Drama Series	Allison Janney	Nominated	
TV Guide Awards	2001	Supporting Actor of the Year in a Drama Series	Rob Lowe	Nominated	
TV Guide Awards	2001	Supporting Actor of the Year in a Drama Series	John Spencer	Nominated	
TV Guide Awards	2001	Supporting Actress of the Year in a Drama Series	Stockard Channing	Nominated	
Writers Guild of America Awards	2000	Television: Episodic Drama	Ron Osborn, Jeff Reno, Rick Cleveland, Lawrence O'Donnell Jr., and Patrick Caddell (for "Enemies")	Nominated	
Writers Guild of America Awards	2000	Television: Episodic Drama	Aaron Sorkin and Rick Cleveland (for "In Excelsis Deo")	Won	
Writers Guild of America Awards	2000	Television: Episodic Drama	Aaron Sorkin, Lawrence O'Donnell Jr., and Paul Redford (for "Take This Sabbath Day")	Nominated	
Writers Guild of America Awards	2001	Television: Episodic Drama	Paul Redford and Aaron Sorkin (for "Somebody's Going to Emergency, Somebody's Going to Jail")	Nominated	
Writers Guild of America Awards	2001	Television: Episodic Drama	Aaron Sorkin (for "Two Cathedrals")	Nominated	
Writers Guild of America Awards	2002	Television: Episodic Drama	Aaron Sorkin and Paul Redford (for "Game On")	Nominated	
Writers Guild of America Awards	2003	Television: Episodic Drama	Alexa Junge and Lauren Schmidt (for "Disaster Relief")	Nominated	
Writers Guild of America Awards	2004	Television: Episodic Drama	Debora Cahn (for "The Supremes")	Won	
Writers Guild of America Awards	2004	Television: Episodic Drama	John Sacret Young and Josh Singer (for "Memorial Day")	Nominated	
Writers Guild of America Awards	2005	Television: Dramatic Series	Eli Attie, Debora Cahn, Carol Flint, Mark Goffman, Alex Graves, Peter Noah, Lawrence O'Donnell Jr., Lauren Schmidt, Josh Singer, Aaron Sorkin, John Wells, Bradley Whitford, and John Sacret Young	Nominated	
Writers Guild of America Awards	2005	Television: Episodic Drama	Carol Flint (for "A Good Day")	Nominated	
Writers Guild of America Awards	2006	Television: Episodic Drama	Eli Attie and John Wells (for "Election Day", Part II)	Nominated	
Young Artist Awards	2001	Best Performance in a TV Drama Series — Guest Starring Young Actress	Elisabeth Moss	Nominated	
Young Artist Awards	2006	Best Performance in a Television Series (Comedy or Drama) — Guest Starring Young Actor	Seth Adkins	Nominated	

=== Emmy awards and nominations for the cast ===
Emmy awards and nominations for the cast
Actor	Character	Category	Seasons						
Actor	Character	Category	1	2	3	4	5	6	7
Martin Sheen	Josiah Bartlet	Lead Actor	Nominated	Nominated	Nominated	Nominated	Nominated		Nominated
Richard Schiff	Toby Ziegler	Supporting Actor	Won	Nominated	Nominated				
John Spencer	Leo McGarry	Supporting Actor	Nominated	Nominated	Won	Nominated	Nominated		
Stockard Channing	Abbey Bartlet	Supporting Actress	Nominated	Nominated	Won	Nominated	Nominated	Nominated	
Allison Janney	C. J. Cregg	Supporting Actress	Won	Won	—N/a	—N/a	—N/a	—N/a	—N/a
Allison Janney	C. J. Cregg	Lead Actress	—N/a	—N/a	Won	Nominated	Won		Nominated
Rob Lowe	Sam Seaborn	Lead Actor		Nominated					
Bradley Whitford	Josh Lyman	Supporting Actor		Won	Nominated	Nominated			
Oliver Platt	Oliver Babish	Guest Actor		Nominated					
Dulé Hill	Charlie Young	Supporting Actor			Nominated				
Janel Moloney	Donna Moss	Supporting Actress			Nominated		Nominated		
Mary-Louise Parker	Amy Gardner	Supporting Actress			Nominated				
Mark Harmon	Simon Donovan	Guest Actor			Nominated				
Tim Matheson	John Hoynes	Guest Actor			Nominated	Nominated			
Ron Silver	Bruno Gianelli	Guest Actor			Nominated				
Matthew Perry	Joe Quincy	Guest Actor				Nominated	Nominated		
Alan Alda	Arnold Vinick	Supporting Actor						Nominated	Won
