= What Kind of Day Has It Been =

- The West Wing episode
- President Bartlet is rushed into his limo by Secret Service agents after shots ring out
- Episode no.: Season 1 Episode 22
- Directed by: Thomas Schlamme
- Written by: Aaron Sorkin
- Production code: 225921
- Original air date: May 17, 2000

Guest appearances
- Timothy Busfield as Danny Concannon; Jorja Fox as Agent Gina Toscano; Janel Moloney as Donna Moss; Elisabeth Moss as Zoey Bartlet; Suzy Nakamura as Cathy; Michael O'Neill as Agent Ron Butterfield; John Amos as Percy Fitzwallace; Tim Matheson as Vice President John Hoynes; Kathryn Joosten as Dolores Landingham

Episode chronology
← Previous "Lies, Damn Lies and Statistics"	Next → "In the Shadow of Two Gunmen"
- The West Wing season 1

"What Kind of Day Has It Been" is the 22nd episode of The West Wing, the season finale of the show's first season. It originally aired on NBC on May 17, 2000. Events circle around the attempted rescue of a US fighter pilot in Iraq, and the president taking part in a town hall meeting in Rosslyn, Virginia. The episode was written by Aaron Sorkin and directed by Thomas Schlamme. "What Kind of Day Has It Been" is also the name of the first-season finales of both the series Sports Night and Studio 60 on the Sunset Strip, as well as the series finale of The Newsroom, all of which were created by Aaron Sorkin. It was also a quote by Leo in the fourth-season episode "Commencement" in the situation room. Sorkin claimed that he took the phrase from Robert Whitehead, lead producer of Sorkin's A Few Good Men, who used to start meetings at the end of rehearsal days by asking this question.

== Plot ==
President Bartlet is preparing for a town hall meeting later that evening at the Newseum in Rosslyn, Virginia. Meanwhile, the Secret Service are becoming increasingly concerned about threats on the life of the President's youngest daughter, Zoey, and her Black boyfriend, the President's personal aide, Charlie, from White Supremacist groups. In addition to this, the military are performing a delicate rescue mission of an American pilot, stranded in Iraq, with Iraqi security forces trying to find him.

Toby is worried, because his brother is in a space shuttle orbiting Earth but unable to land due to some technical problems. Josh has to put some pressure on Vice President Hoynes, on the subject of campaign finance reform. C.J. has to lie to the press to keep the Iraqi rescue mission covert, but doing so she incurs the anger of reporter Danny Concannon.

During the town hall meeting, the evening is turning into a great success for the whole Bartlet administration. The pilot was saved without any bloodshed and while Bartlet is answering questions, the news comes through that the shuttle carrying Toby's brother is safe. As the senior staff come out of the building laughing and joking, Secret Service Agent Gina Toscano tells Zoey to get in the car, made nervous by the sight of a young man who doesn't seem to fit with the crowd, and sensing danger from the window of an overlooking building. Suddenly, the man looks up to a window and removes his hat, before disappearing. As Gina turns around, she spots two more men aiming guns out of said window, and yells a warning, screaming "GUN!", before shots ring out. Scenes show each member of the senior staff being thrown to the ground by agents and chaos erupting. As the scene pans out to show the carnage, a Secret Service agent can be heard on the radio, asking "Who's been hit?! Who's been hit?!"

== Real-life connections ==
Seal of the president of the United States

While waiting with Bartlet in the Oval office for news on the missing pilot, Admiral Fitzwallace makes an observation on the presidential seal. The eagle on the seal holds an olive branch in its right talons and arrows in its left, and faces towards the olive branch. Yet when Congress declares war, he says, the eagle faces the arrows. This is an urban legend; though the design of the seal has changed over time, President Truman decided by Executive Order 9646, in 1945, that the eagle should always face right, towards the olive branch.

President Bartlet's supposed ancestor Josiah Bartlett (written with two "t"s), of whom the president speaks during the town hall meeting, was in fact one of the signatories of the Declaration of Independence. He later also served as Chief Justice of the New Hampshire Supreme Court and as Governor of the state.

The leg of actress Jorja Fox, playing Agent Gina Toscano, was accidentally run over during the final scene. She was rushed to hospital but was fine and came away with only bruises. According to Aaron Sorkin, Fox later apologized, saying it was her fault for missing her mark.

== Reception ==
The West Wing's first season finale was nominated for an Emmy award for Outstanding Single Camera Picture Editing for a Series (Tina Hirsch). This was one of two Emmy nominations the series received in this category for 2000, the other being for episode 10, "In Excelsis Deo" (Bill Johnson). In the end the award was won by ER, but Hirsch did win an Eddie Award for Best Edited One-Hour Series for Television. "What Kind of Day Has It Been" was also one of eight episodes submitted for the Outstanding Drama Series Emmy, which the first season won. The other seven episodes were: "Pilot," "The Crackpots and These Women," "In Excelsis Deo," "Take This Sabbath Day," "Celestial Navigation," "The White House Pro-Am," and "Let Bartlet Be Bartlet."

In spite of the positive reception, there were those who believed the cliffhanger ending to the season was a cliché; that it was a cheap dramatic trick simply intended to maintain high ratings. The creators and cast members rejected this, and claimed that it was never intended as a traditional cliffhanger, but rather as a narrative device for exploring new story lines:

It's not about who's coming back and who's not... but a kind of convention that he's [Aaron Sorkin] interested in exploring.

— John Spencer (Leo McGarry)
