= The West Wing season 4 =

The West Wing
- Season 4
- DVD box cover. Cast from top to bottom and left to right: Donna, Josh, Will, Sam, Charlie, C. J., Toby, Abbey, President Bartlet and Leo
- Showrunner: Aaron Sorkin
- Starring: Rob Lowe; Stockard Channing; Dulé Hill; Allison Janney; Joshua Malina; Janel Moloney; Richard Schiff; John Spencer; Bradley Whitford; Martin Sheen
- No. of episodes: 23

Release
- Original network: NBC
- Original release: September 25, 2002 – May 14, 2003

Season chronology
- ← Previous; Season 3 Next → Season 5

The fourth season of the American political drama television series The West Wing aired in the United States on NBC from September 25, 2002 to May 14, 2003 and consisted of 23 episodes.

== Production ==
After the difficulties Aaron Sorkin encountered in writing Season 3, he saw Season 4 as a return to the form he and the show had previously enjoyed, saying "[we] came back to work, after the hiatus, and didn't feel any of that, just felt the week-to-week pressure of trying to write well." In 2003, at the end of the fourth season, Sorkin and fellow executive producer Thomas Schlamme left the show due to internal conflicts at Warner Bros. TV not involving the NBC network, thrusting producer John Wells into an expanded role as showrunner. Rob Lowe departed the series after episode 17, saying he was not happy with his character Sam Seaborn and believed he did not fit in the show anymore.

On December 11, 2015, in an interview with the Archive of American Television, producer John Wells said that Sorkin was unhappy with two of the cast members, and wanted one in particular removed from the show. NBC disagreed, but Sorkin "just stopped writing the character." As the season progressed, with ratings cresting and episodes consistently going over-budget, Wells told Sorkin he would have to be more responsive to the demands of the network and the studio. When a meeting with Warner Bros. executives, backed by NBC, was held at the end of the season, Sorkin declined to make any changes to the way he worked, and quit the show.

== Cast ==
The fourth season had star billing for ten major roles. Nine of these were filled by returning main cast members from the third season. Rob Lowe received star billing for the episodes in which he appeared, while Martin Sheen received the final credit for his role as President Josiah Bartlet. The rest of the ensemble, including (from episode eleven) Joshua Malina, were credited alphabetically. Rob Lowe departed in episode seventeen. Stockard Channing was only credited for the episodes in which she appeared.

=== Main cast ===
- Rob Lowe as Sam Seaborn
- Stockard Channing as Abbey Bartlet
- Dulé Hill as Charlie Young
- Allison Janney as C. J. Cregg
- Joshua Malina as Will Bailey
- Janel Moloney as Donna Moss
- Richard Schiff as Toby Ziegler
- John Spencer as Leo McGarry
- Bradley Whitford as Josh Lyman
- Martin Sheen as Josiah Bartlet

== Plot ==
The fourth season covers the end of Bartlet's fourth year of his first term in office through the beginning of the first year of his second term. The season begins with the continuation of the election storyline with the president touring the nation and his staff trying to firm up presidential debates. The storyline ends in a clear victory for Bartlet less than halfway through the season in "Election Night". Other plots include Sam leaving the White House to run in a special election in California, the news of the Abdul Shareef assassination resonating both inside and outside the U.S., Will Bailey taking Sam's position after coming over from the California campaign's staff, the President and his staff facing the reality of an overseas genocide, and Vice President Hoynes being forced to resign after a sex scandal is uncovered. The fourth season ends with Bartlet's youngest daughter being taken hostage. Bartlet ends up invoking the 25th Amendment in the final episode, "Twenty Five." Since no one had been nominated to replace Hoynes, the presidency passes to the iron-willed conservative Republican Speaker of the House, Glen Allen Walken.

== Episodes ==
No. overall	No. in season	Title	Directed by	Written by	Original release date	Prod. code	US viewers (millions)
66	1	"20 Hours in America"	Christopher Misiano	Aaron Sorkin	September 25, 2002	175301	18.16
67	2	"20 Hours in America"	Christopher Misiano	Aaron Sorkin	September 25, 2002	175302	18.16
Donna, Josh and Toby are stranded in Indiana when the presidential motorcade leaves a campaign stop without them, leaving Sam to staff the President alone. Leo is informed that Qumar has reopened the investigation into the death of its defense minister, Abdul ibn Shareef. In a stop in a hotel bar on their way back to the White House, Donna, Josh and Toby meet a man who is struggling with the thought of paying for his daughter's education. Sam spends the day as the President's "wide-angle lens" on policy issues. Debbie Fiderer has a second job interview with the President and her impressive ties to Charlie Young are revealed. A bombing at a collegiate swimming meet sparks a national tragedy. Bartlet delivers his 'angels and heroes' speech. Note: Bradley Whitford submitted this episode as an Emmy nominee for Outstanding Supporting Actor in a Drama Series. Also submitted for Outstanding Drama win.
68	3	"College Kids"	Alex Graves	Story by : Debora Cahn and Mark Goffman; Teleplay by : Aaron Sorkin	October 2, 2002	175303	16.70
Josh and Toby consider a way to help parents pay for college tuition. Leo approaches Jordon Kendall for legal advice on the Shareef assassination. The staff are concerned by a judicial ruling that allows third party candidates into the presidential debates.
69	4	"The Red Mass"	Vincent Misiano	Story by : Eli Attie; Teleplay by : Aaron Sorkin	October 9, 2002	175304	15.99
A terrorist standoff in Iowa is complicated by the presence of a sick child. The White House negotiates on the number of presidential debates, which results in Sam advocating a risky strategy. Senator Howard Stackhouse considers a third party candidacy, leading Josh to accuse him of potentially stealing "the President's votes". Leo and the Israeli defense minister discuss Qumar's investigation into Shareef's death. Note: The episode title refers to a Mass celebrated in the Catholic Church for members of the legal profession. John Spencer submitted this episode as an Emmy nominee for Outstanding Supporting Actor in a Drama Series.
70	5	"Debate Camp"	Paris Barclay	Story by : William Sind & Michael Oates Palmer; Teleplay by : Aaron Sorkin	October 16, 2002	175305	15.91
Tension between Israel and Qumar escalates while Bartlet is preparing for the Presidential debate. Both the questions raised in debate preparation and those present lead to flashbacks to the administration's first weeks in office. Toby tries to get his pregnant ex-wife to remarry him.
71	6	"Game On"	Alex Graves	Aaron Sorkin & Paul Redford	October 23, 2002	175306	15.73
The President and staff travel to California for the Presidential debate. CJ is concerned over which Bartlet will be debating, the President at his best or "Uncle Fluffy." Sam travels ahead to meet with the campaign manager of the deceased Horton Wilde to urge him to stop the campaign but ends up making a deal with him instead. Leo remains at the White House to meet with a representative from Qumar.
72	7	"Election Night"	Lesli Linka Glatter	Story by : David Gerken and David Handelman; Teleplay by : Aaron Sorkin	October 30, 2002	175308	16.22
Results are coming in from around the country. Both Charlie and the First Lady are concerned for the President's health. The stunning result in the California 47th could have serious implications for Sam. Donna, while trying to "swap votes," meets a new White House military aide. The President wins re-election in a landslide.
73	8	"Process Stories"	Christopher Misiano	Story by : Paula Yoo & Lauren Schmidt; Teleplay by : Aaron Sorkin	November 6, 2002	175309	15.79
In the wake of the President's victory, C.J. deals with an impostor campaign advisor trying to steal the spotlight. Donna develops a relationship with Lt. Commander Jack Reese (Christian Slater). A potential military coup in Venezuela interrupts Leo's plans with Jordan Kendall, and Sam contemplates a possible congressional run, imposing on the President's private victory party with the First Lady. Toby reveals his ex-wife's pregnancy to the President.
74	9	"Swiss Diplomacy"	Christopher Misiano	Kevin Falls & Eli Attie	November 13, 2002	175307	15.03
The Ayatollah of Iran arranges through a Swiss intermediary for his son to fly to the United States for a life saving heart operation, which sends Leo and the President into political turmoil. Josh must deal with nervous Democrats in Congress already distancing themselves from the re-elected President and manages to insult the Vice President.
75	10	"Arctic Radar"	John David Coles	Story by : Gene Sperling; Teleplay by : Aaron Sorkin	November 20, 2002	175310	14.28
A charge against a top female fighter pilot has the women of the White House up in arms, driving the President and Leo to frustration. Josh unwillingly plays matchmaker with Commander Reese as a favor to Donna. Toby is in the midst of a powerful case of writer's block when Will Bailey (Joshua Malina) shows up at Sam's recommendation to help with the Inaugural Address.
76	11	"Holy Night"	Thomas Schlamme	Aaron Sorkin	November 27, 2002	175311	15.39
Zoey Bartlet arrives with a new boyfriend, the French aristocrat Jean-Paul Pierre Claude Charpentier, Vicomte de Bourbon, igniting jealousy in Charlie. Toby's estranged father arrives to make amends. Danny Concannon returns with a hunch about who killed the Qumari Defense Minister, as well as a present for C.J. Bartlet begins to feel the weight of Shareef's assassination on his conscience. Note: Submitted as part of Emmy win for Outstanding Drama Series.
77	12	"Guns Not Butter"	Bill D'Elia	Eli Attie & Kevin Falls and Aaron Sorkin	December 11, 2002	175312	13.96
Charlie tries to impress Zoey by showing the reach of his power, and draws fire from the highest levels of the Pentagon. Josh works feverishly on a foreign aid bill and winds up in hot water. C.J. sets up an unusual photo-op for the President. Note: The episode title refers to a macroeconomic model illustrating the effects of choices in government spending,
78	13	"The Long Goodbye"	Alex Graves	Jon Robin Baitz	January 15, 2003	175313	14.45
This episode is notable as a change of pace from the typical West Wing format, as it focuses solely on one character's home life and does not touch upon operations at the White House. C.J. returns home to Ohio for a class reunion and to visit her Alzheimer's-stricken father (Donald Moffat). As Toby juggles C.J.'s daily press duties in the West Wing, C.J. struggles with how to care for her father from afar as he continues to worsen, and her feelings for a former classmate. Note: Allison Janney submitted this episode as an Emmy Nominee for Outstanding Lead Actress in a Drama Series.
79	14	"Inauguration: Part I"	Christopher Misiano	Story by : Michael Oates Palmer & William Sind; Teleplay by : Aaron Sorkin	February 5, 2003	175314	13.03
Will struggles with the politically-correct vetting process for the inauguration speech. Charlie scrambles to find the right Bible for the President to take his oath. An African conflict begins to turn to genocide, with calls for American intervention.
80	15	"Inauguration: Over There"	Lesli Linka Glatter	Story by : David Gerken & Gene Sperling; Teleplay by : Aaron Sorkin	February 12, 2003	175315	13.59
As the inaugural balls commence, the President must make a decision regarding the Kundu crisis, at the risk of alienating many of his constituents. Toby wants Will considered for a promotion. Josh believes that a recent comment in the press came from Donna. Note: Submitted as part of Emmy win for Outstanding Drama Series.
81	16	"The California 47th"	Vincent Misiano	Story by : Lauren Schmidt & Paula Yoo; Teleplay by : Aaron Sorkin	February 19, 2003	175316	12.23
While Leo stays in Washington to oversee the Kundu situation, President Bartlet visits Orange County to campaign for Sam, but a list of problems arises, including the President's comments about the French, a traffic jam caused by the Presidential motorcade, and an altercation that lands Toby and Charlie in jail. As the President shakes up Sam's campaign staff, Will is left with no speechwriting staff, an endless list of assignments, and four interns to get everything done.
82	17	"Red Haven's on Fire"	Alex Graves	Story by : Mark Goffman & Debora Cahn; Teleplay by : Aaron Sorkin	February 26, 2003	175317	14.01
Toby takes over Sam's campaign with help from C.J. and Amy Gardner, but it quickly becomes clear the ship is sinking. The capture of three Marines in Kundu leads to a larger crisis. Josh's condescending comments to the First Lady lead to new competition for his office in the guise of Amy. Will's interns prove their mettle. Note: Rob Lowe's final appearance as a member of the main cast.
83	18	"Privateers"	Alex Graves	Story by : Paul Redford & Debora Cahn; Teleplay by : Paul Redford & Debora Cahn and Aaron Sorkin	March 26, 2003	175318	11.70
A member of the Daughters of the American Revolution questions the validity of Abbey's membership on the morning before Zoey's induction into the organization. On her first day of work, Amy is ordered by the First Lady to shoot down a crucial foreign aid bill. Charlie continues his quest to win Zoey back. Note: The episode title refers to the true occupation of the ancestor who earned Abbey her membership in the DAR. Stockard Channing submitted this episode as a nominee for Outstanding Supporting Actress in a Drama Series.
84	19	"Angel Maintenance"	Jessica Yu	Story by : Eli Attie & Kevin Falls; Teleplay by : Eli Attie and Aaron Sorkin	April 2, 2003	175320	12.72
A malfunction on Air Force One leaves the President, Will, and C.J. airborne over the Northeast. C.J. and Will try to keep the press in the dark, and the President works on the drug war via the issue of certifying Colombia's worthiness as a partner in it. Josh works on an environmental bill with a vulnerable Republican congressman, while Leo tries to keep the President calm via phone. Note: The episode title refers to "Angel," the Airlift Operations code word for Air Force One.
85	20	"Evidence of Things Not Seen"	Christopher Misiano	Story by : Eli Attie & David Handelman; Teleplay by : Aaron Sorkin	April 23, 2003	175319	13.65
A late night staff poker game is continually interrupted by crises. The President must deal with a downed spy drone in Russia without upsetting the Russian President. Josh senses something strange about his new candidate for Associate White House Counsel. C.J. tries to convince Toby and Will that an egg will stand on its end during the vernal equinox, and a gunman fires at the White House from Pennsylvania Avenue. Note: The episode title refers to a passage from Hebrews 11: "Faith is the substance of things hoped for and the evidence of things not seen." Bradley Whitford submitted this episode as a nominee for Outstanding Supporting Actor in a Drama Series. Also submitted for Outstanding Drama win.
86	21	"Life on Mars"	John David Coles	Story by : Paul Redford & Dee Dee Myers; Teleplay by : Aaron Sorkin	April 30, 2003	175321	13.18
On his first day at work, new Associate Counsel Joe Quincy (Matthew Perry) uncovers a scandal of mammoth proportions, sending shockwaves through the administration. As he researches the possibility of a classified Mars report, he discovers the Vice President's affair with a Washington socialite, and the President must make a decision. Note: Submitted as part of Emmy win for Outstanding Drama Series.
87	22	"Commencement"	Alex Graves	Aaron Sorkin	May 7, 2003	175322	13.37
Josh begins the selection process for a new Vice President, with some surprising candidates. Charlie makes peace with his feelings for Zoey, but Zoey turns the tables. The President procrastinates on the commencement speech he must give at Zoey's graduation from Georgetown. Toby tries to win his pregnant ex-wife's affections with a new house, only to have her go into labor before a decision is made. A late night party turns tragic when a Secret Service agent is found dead and Zoey Bartlet missing. Note: Submitted as part of Emmy win for Outstanding Drama Series.
88	23	"Twenty Five"	Christopher Misiano	Aaron Sorkin	May 14, 2003	175323	13.79
The First Family is reeling in the wake of Zoey's abduction, leading the First Lady to be sedated and the President to doubt his ability to make decisions clearly. Toby's ex-wife gives birth to twins. The staff begins to weigh the implications the tragedy will have on all their jobs and the country in general. In the episode's final moments, Bartlet realizes that he cannot act as President because he cannot make impartial judgments about what to do next, and temporarily steps down from the Presidency using the 25th Amendment. Due to the lack of a Vice President, the iron willed conservative Republican Speaker of the House Glen Allen Walken (John Goodman) becomes acting president. Note: Won an Emmy for Outstanding Directing of a Drama Series. Nominated for Outstanding Writing for a Drama Series. Martin Sheen submitted this episode as an Emmy nominee for Outstanding Lead Actor. John Spencer submitted this episode as a nominee for Outstanding Supporting Actor. Stockard Channing submitted this episode as a nominee for Outstanding Supporting Actress.

== Reception ==
=== Critical response ===
On Rotten Tomatoes, the season has an approval rating of 92% with an average score of 8 out of 10 based on 12 reviews.

=== Accolades ===
The fourth season received 15 Emmy Award nominations for the 55th Primetime Emmy Awards, winning a total of 2 awards. The series won its fourth consecutive and final award for Outstanding Drama Series. Christopher Misiano won the season's other award, for Outstanding Directing for a Drama Series for "Twenty Five". Notable nominations included Martin Sheen for Outstanding Lead Actor in a Drama Series, Allison Janney for Outstanding Lead Actress in a Drama Series, John Spencer and Bradley Whitford for Outstanding Supporting Actor in a Drama Series, Stockard Channing for Outstanding Supporting Actress in a Drama Series, and Tim Matheson and Matthew Perry for Outstanding Guest Actor in a Drama Series. Aaron Sorkin was nominated for Outstanding Writing for a Drama Series for "Twenty Five".

Thomas Del Ruth received a nomination from the American Society of Cinematographers for the episode "Holy Night".
