= In Excelsis Deo =

- The West Wing episode
- The burial scene, filmed at Arlington National Cemetery
- Episode no.: Season 1 Episode 10
- Directed by: Alex Graves
- Written by: Aaron Sorkin; Rick Cleveland
- Production code: 225909
- Original air date: December 15, 1999

Guest appearances
- Lisa Edelstein as Laurie Rollins; Timothy Busfield as Danny Concannon; Paul Austin as George Huffnagle; Janel Moloney as Donna Moss; Tom Quinn as John Noonan; Renee Estevez as Nancy; Raynor Scheine as Homeless Man; Lance Reddick as DC Police Officer

Episode chronology
← Previous "The Short List"	Next → "Lord John Marbury"
- The West Wing season 1

"In Excelsis Deo" is the tenth episode of the first season of The West Wing. It originally aired on NBC on December 15, 1999, as the show's Christmas special. Events circle around Toby Ziegler getting involved in the fate of a dead Korean War veteran, reactions to a severe hate crime, and the ongoing controversy surrounding Leo's past alcohol and prescription drug abuse. Written by Aaron Sorkin and Rick Cleveland and directed by Alex Graves, the episode contains guest appearances by Paul Austin and Raynor Scheine. It earned Sorkin and Cleveland the Primetime Emmy Award for Outstanding Writing for a Drama Series, as well as one for Richard Schiff.

== Plot ==
As the episode begins, Toby gets called by the Metropolitan Police Department of the District of Columbia to identify a dead homeless man. It turns out the man (a Korean War veteran from the 2nd Battalion, 7th Marines who received the Purple Heart) was wearing a coat that Toby donated to Goodwill, and Toby had left his business card in it. The event stays with him, and he tracks down the man's next of kin. The only relative he can find is a brother, also homeless. Using the influence of the president's office, he arranges a military funeral at Arlington National Cemetery. President Bartlet is informed about Toby’s transgression, but can only muster limited indignation and jocularly asks if the country is still in NATO. To the president's concern that this could create precedent for other veterans to come forward, Toby replies "I can only hope, sir." Mrs. Landingham, who has just told Charlie Young about losing her twin sons in the Vietnam War, joins Toby and the veteran's brother at the funeral.

Meanwhile, Josh Lyman – who is worried that Rep. Peter Lillienfield (R) may disclose information the Congressman has about Leo McGarry's past treatment for alcohol and Valium abuse – approaches Sam Seaborn and proposes using Sam's prostitute friend to dig up dirt as leverage against Lillienfield's allies when the time comes. Leo objects strongly to the plan, calling it unethical.

C. J. Cregg gets emotionally involved in a story about the deadly assault of a young gay male. She sees this as an opportunity to push hate crime legislation, but the suggestion finds little support among the others. Reporter Danny Concannon also disagrees, but this encourages her to finally accept his offer of a date, to have him convince her.

Bartlet sneaks out to go shopping at a rare book store and refuses to take photographers along, much to Mandy Hampton's chagrin. Donna Moss has at this point been pestering Josh about her Christmas gift all day. While he doesn't follow the list submitted, he picks up a book for her at the shop and writes a message in it that leaves her tearful but happy.

== Production and real-life issues ==
The episode's title is taken from the angels' song to the shepherds in Luke 2:14, announcing the birth of Jesus, and is in reference to the show's Christmas theme. The words also make up the beginning of the Great Doxology: Gloria in excelsis Deo (glory to God in the highest).

This episode was awarded the Primetime Emmy Award for Outstanding Writing for a Drama Series, credited to Aaron Sorkin and Rick Cleveland. In the summer of 2001, a dispute between Sorkin and Cleveland transpired on the internet forum mightybigtv.com (later known as Television Without Pity). Cleveland claimed to have had the original idea, based on the experiences of his father who was a Korean War veteran, and felt offended that Sorkin had not given him a chance to honor his father’s memory at the award ceremony. Sorkin responded that Cleveland had not contributed significantly, and that writing credits were simply rotated among the staff writers. The argument ended amicably, with Sorkin apologizing for belittling Cleveland's effort and the two writers expressing their admiration for each other.

The scene at Arlington was made with the full co-operation of the United States Department of Defense, who liked the message of the script and wanted to do what they could to help. Originally, the president was to have been in the scene as well, but this was changed because it "took away the power of Mrs. Landingham and Ziegler"; it was felt that the scene would be more powerful without the looming presence of the chief executive. The fourth person attending the funeral is the superintendent of Arlington National Cemetery John C. Metzler Jr., appearing as himself. The funeral is accompanied by the song "The Little Drummer Boy", sung by the boys' choir.

The subplot about the hate crime against the young gay man is based on the real-life case of Matthew Shepard. This was confirmed by Allison Janney in an interview with the gay magazine The Advocate.

== Reception ==
Sorkin and Cleveland won the Primetime Emmy Award for Outstanding Writing for a Drama Series, and actor Richard Schiff (Toby Ziegler) was awarded the prize for Outstanding Supporting Actor in a Drama Series. The episode was also nominated for Outstanding Single-Camera Picture Editing for a Series and Outstanding Sound Mixing for a Drama Series. Cleveland and Sorkin also won the Writers Guild of America Award for Television: Episodic Drama at the 53rd Writers Guild of America Awards.
