= Twenty Five (The West Wing) =

- The West Wing episode
- Episode no.: Season 4 Episode 23
- Directed by: Christopher Misiano
- Written by: Aaron Sorkin
- Production code: 175323
- Original air date: May 14, 2003

Guest appearances
- Mary-Louise Parker; John Amos; Taye Diggs; Michael O'Neill; Anna Deavere Smith; Clark Gregg; Harry Groener; NiCole Robinson; Trent Ford; Alan Dale; Vernee Watson-Johnson; John Goodman (uncredited)

Episode chronology
← Previous "Commencement"	Next → "7A WF 83429"
- The West Wing season 4

"Twenty Five" is the 88th episode and the season four finale of the American television series The West Wing. The episode aired on May 14, 2003, on NBC. It takes its title from the Twenty-fifth Amendment to the United States Constitution, which deals with the presidential line of succession.

== Plot ==
Continuing the storyline begun in the previous episode, a massive manhunt begins for President Bartlet's youngest daughter, Zoey, but the Secret Service's only clue is provided when Charlie Young remembers that Zoey's boyfriend, Jean-Paul, wanted her to take ecstasy at her graduation party. The Secret Service discovers that what Jean-Paul thought was ecstasy was actually GHB.

While the White House senior staff attempts to rally around the President and First Lady, the president's advisors immediately clash over how to handle the situation: Joint Chiefs chairman Admiral Fitzwallace believes the abduction to be an act of terrorism and advises a military response, while National Security Advisor Nancy McNally theorizes that Zoey's abduction may be a standard (albeit high-profile) kidnapping, and cautions that military action may hinder the investigation and antagonize political enemies. The question of whether Zoey's abduction is an act of terrorism or a simple kidnapping is heightened by a faxed ransom note found by Donna, which indicates that the crime has elements of both.

Confusion over how to handle the situation is exacerbated by a false alarm when an unidentified aircraft violates the emergency no-fly zone. A last-second revelation that the plane is piloted by students playing a prank does nothing to alleviate the president's fear that he has lost control over the situation. Privately, he confesses to Leo McGarry that his concern for Zoey is so distracting that he is unable to pay attention to vital national security concerns.

Meanwhile, Toby Ziegler is at the hospital, bonding with his newborn twins: Huck, after Andy's grandfather, and Molly, after the Secret Service agent who was killed protecting Zoey in the previous episode. Toby's love for his children makes him realize that the president suffers from a severe conflict of interest because of his duties as a father and his duties as the president. Toby rushes to the White House to advise the president to step down, only to discover that Bartlet has already invoked the twenty-fifth amendment.

With the office of vice president vacant after John Hoynes's resignation due to a sex scandal, the amendment requires that following the line of succession, the Speaker of the House, Glen Allen Walken (John Goodman), take over the presidency temporarily. After Walken is sworn in as president, conflicts have already begun between him and President Bartlet's staff, one reason being that Bartlet is a liberal Democrat and Walken is a conservative Republican. Bartlet tries to calm Walken, stating that the staff are all trying to resolve the situation, to which Walken replies, "You are relieved, Mr. President."

== Production ==
The episode marks the departure of creator/writer/producer Aaron Sorkin and producer/director Thomas Schlamme, who left after overruns with budgets, script deadlines, and conflicts with NBC president Jeff Zucker.

The episode's director, Christopher Misiano, won the Primetime Emmy Award for Outstanding Directing for a Drama Series for this episode in 2003. The episode was also nominated for, but did not win, Outstanding Writing for a Drama Series at the Primetime Emmy Awards that same year.

Emilio Estevez, Martin Sheen's son, has an uncredited cameo as the young Jed Bartlet in news footage shown in the hospital.
