= Noël (The West Wing) =

- The West Wing episode
- Episode no.: Season 2 Episode 10
- Directed by: Thomas Schlamme
- Story by: Peter Parnell
- Teleplay by: Aaron Sorkin
- Production code: 226210
- Original air date: December 13, 2000

Guest appearances
- Adam Arkin as Dr. Stanley Keyworth; Paxton Whitehead as Bernard Thatch; Gregalan Alan Williams as Robbie Mosley; Gary Cervantes as Bobby; Daniel von Bargen as Air Force Gen. Ken Shannon; Yo-Yo Ma as himself

Episode chronology
← Previous "Galileo"	Next → "The Leadership Breakfast"
- The West Wing season 2

"Noël" is the 10th episode of the second season of The West Wing. The episode aired on December 13, 2000 on NBC.

== Plot ==
Due to his colleagues' growing concern over his behavior Josh spends the day with Stanley Keyworth, a psychotherapist from the American Trauma Victims Association (ATVA). Stanley notices Josh's bandaged hand and asks about it. Josh insists that he cut his hand on a glass, even though Stanley makes it clear that he doesn't believe him. Josh recounts the last few weeks:

His behavior began to change on the day that he was assigned to review the personal and military history of an Air Force pilot who had broken away from his fighter jet's training formation. Josh had discovered that the two shared the same birthday, and that the pilot had been shot down and injured over Bosnia. Before Josh had a chance to report on this, the pilot radioed in to say, "It wasn't the plane," and killed himself by crashing into a mountain near Mexico City. Days later, while discussing a political situation, Josh raised his voice to the President in the Oval Office, at which point Leo called in ATVA to talk to him. During the congressional Christmas party, Yo-Yo Ma performed Bach's Suite No. 1 in G major and Josh was overcome with panic. When he went home, he slammed his hand into his window and cut himself on the broken glass.

Stanley asks Josh if, given what he had in common with the pilot – their common birthday and injuries – he wondered if he himself might have been suicidal. Josh initially denies this, but eventually admits that during the party he found himself reliving the attack at Rosslyn and that he felt out of control. Stanley tells him that his increasing stress and the episode at the party were triggered by the presence of a brass quintet at the White House, which subconsciously reminded Josh of police and ambulance sirens, thereby transporting him back to his own shooting and near-death in Rosslyn. He is diagnosed with post-traumatic stress disorder; he is concerned this will endanger his job, but Leo promises him "as long as I got a job, you got a job" in a speech which aligns Josh's trauma with Leo's own difficult past.

In another story, C.J. is told by a reporter that a woman saw a painting on the White House Tour and began screaming. C.J. does some research and finds out with the help of Bernard Thatch, the White House's snobbish but competent Protocol Chief, that the painting was owned by a Jewish family in Europe, seized by the Nazi collaborationist French Vichy Regime, and eventually given as a gift to the White House by the French government. The woman's father owned the painting, and C.J. returns it to the grateful woman and her son.

Sam is interested in a measure to tap the Strategic Petroleum Reserve to reduce high gas prices, and the staff decides to review the issue when the new year begins. Finally, the President wants to sign all of his holiday cards by hand, until he is told the total number of cards is 1,110,000.

== Awards ==
- Thomas Del Ruth won the American Society of Cinematographers award for cinematography for this episode.
- Bradley Whitford won the 2001 Best Supporting Actor Emmy Award, in part for his performance in this episode.
- Thomas Schlamme won the 2000 Directors Guild of America Award for Best Dramatic Series for this episode.
