= Rick Cleveland =

American screenwriter

- Education: University of Iowa (MFA)
- Occupations: Television writer, consulting producer, screenwriter, playwright, monologist
- Writing career
- Notable works: Six Feet Under, The West Wing, Mad Men

Rick Cleveland is an American television writer, playwright, and monologist, best known for writing on the HBO original series Six Feet Under and NBC's The West Wing. His 2011 play The Rail Splitter premiered at Carthage College as the third production of Carthage's annual New Play Initiative. The production also traveled to the American College Theatre Festival (Region 3) in 2012.

== Education ==
Cleveland, a graduate of the Playwrights Workshop at the University of Iowa, is also a founding member of Chicago's American Blues Theater.

== Career ==
=== Film ===
Cleveland, Brian Koppelman, David Levien, and Matthew Chapman co-wrote the 2003 film Runaway Jury based on the book by John Grisham. He also wrote a 1998 screenplay for the independent film Jerry and Tom.

=== Television ===
In 2000, Cleveland and The West Wing creator Aaron Sorkin won the Emmy Award for Best Writing for a Drama Series their episode "In Excelsis Deo". The episode originally aired during the 1999–2000 season. Cleveland and Sorkin also won the Writers Guild of America Award for best episodic drama at the February 2001 ceremony for "In Excelsis Deo".

Cleveland worked on the HBO original series Six Feet Under throughout the show's five season run. Cleveland joined the crew as a writer and producer for the show's first season in 2001. He wrote the episode "The Trip". He was promoted to supervising producer for the second season in 2002. He wrote two further episodes – "Driving Mr. Mossback" and "The Liar and the Whore". He remained a supervising producer for the third season in 2003. He scripted two more episodes – "Nobody Sleeps" and "Death Works Overtime". He was promoted to co-executive producer for the fourth season in 2004. He wrote two more episodes – "In Case of Rapture" and "Grinding the Corn". He was promoted again to executive producer for the fifth and final season in 2005 and wrote his last episode, "Eat a Peach". He wrote eight episodes in total for the series.

Cleveland won the Jury Award for Best One Person Show at the 2006 US Comedy Arts Festival in Aspen, Colorado for his performance in "My Buddy Bill", about his fictional friendship with President Bill Clinton, a monologue play filmed on June 15, 2007, for a Comedy Central Special and DVD.

He served as writer for the AMC television drama Mad Men for the show's second season in 2008. He was nominated for the Writers Guild of America Award for Best Dramatic Series at the February 2009 ceremony for his work on the second season.

Cleveland recently served as a consulting producer and writer on the Showtime series Nurse Jackie.

== Filmography ==
Year	Title	Notes
1998	Jerry and Tom	Film, as writer, producer and actor
1999	The West Wing	TV series, wrote episodes: "In Excelsis Deo", with Aaron Sorkin; "Enemies" (story) with Patrick Caddell and Lawrence O'Donnell; produced 21 episodes
2001–2005	Six Feet Under	TV series, wrote episodes: "The Trip"; "Driving Mr. Mossback"; "The Liar and the Whore"; "Nobody Sleeps", with Alan Ball; "Death Works Overtime"; "In Case of Rapture"; "Grinding The Corn"; "Eat a Peach"; produced 36 episodes
2008	My Buddy Bill	TV film, 50 minute stand-up routine written and performed by Rick Cleveland
2008	Mad Men	TV series, wrote episode: "The Benefactor", with Matthew Weiner produced 5 episodes
2009–2010	Nurse Jackie	TV series, wrote episodes: "Tiny Bubbles"; "Pill-O-Mattix"; "Candyland"; "What the Day Brings"; produced 19 episodes
2010	Scoundrels	TV series, wrote episodes: "Liar, Liar, Pants on Fire"; "Who's Afraid of the Big Bad Wolf"; produced 4 episodes
2013	Under the Dome	TV series, wrote episode: "The Fire" produced 4 episodes
2013	Legit	TV series, wrote all first-season episodes except the pilot, with Peter O'Fallon and Jim Jefferies
2013	House of Cards	TV series, wrote episodes: "Chapter 4"; "Chapter 9"; produced 3 episodes
2013	Archer	TV series, wrote episode: "Sea Tunt: Part II", with Adam Reed
2016	The Man in the High Castle	TV series, wrote episodes: "Loose Lips"; "Duck and Cover"
2017	Inhumans	TV series, wrote episodes: "Divide and Conquer"; "...And Finally: Black Bolt"
2018	Claws	TV series, wrote episode: "Russian Navy"
2019	Insatiable	TV series, wrote episode: "Dead Girl"
