= Jon Hutman =

American production designer

- Occupation: Production designer
- Years active: 1984–present

Jon Hutman is an American production designer.

Some of his film credits in that field include Heathers (1988), A River Runs Through It (1992), Quiz Show (1994), French Kiss (1995), The Horse Whisperer (1998), Coyote Ugly (2000) and Rock of Ages (2012). He has also been the production designer for all the films that Nancy Meyers has directed since What Women Want (2000). He has also been the production designer for "The Tourist" (2010) and both of the films that Angelina Jolie has directed since "In the Land of Blood and Honey"(2011) and "Unbroken"(2014).

In 2000, Hutman won a Primetime Emmy Award for Outstanding Art Direction for a Single-Camera Series, for his production design work on the pilot episode of the television series The West Wing, sharing the award with Tony Fanning (art director) and Ellen Totleben (set decorator). In 2001, he directed an episode of The West Wing entitled "Gone Quiet". Prior to this, he directed an episode of Gideon's Crossing.
