= Paul Redford =

American television writer and producer

Paul Redford is an American television writer and producer. He is best known as a writer for The West Wing. His other writing credits include work on Dirty Sexy Money, Big Love, The Newsroom, and Madam Secretary. His work as a producer includes The West Wing, The Unit, and Journeyman. In 2023, Redford joined the Hallmark Channel series When Calls the Heart in its 10th season as a co-executive producer.

== Early life ==
Redford's family moved from Edmonton, Alberta, Canada to the Kansas City metropolitan area when he was in the 10th grade. He and his family lived in Mission Hills, Kansas, and he graduated from Shawnee Mission East High School in 1976. In high school, Redford was a self-described “theatre nerd.”

Redford earned a degree in history and literature from Harvard University in 1980. While at Harvard, he wrote for The Harvard Lampoon and appeared in numerous plays, including experimental work by classmate Peter Sellars.

After college, Redford spent 10 years acting in regional theater productions for groups like the Boston Shakespeare Company and the Denver Center Theatre Company (DCTC) before moving to Hollywood.

== Career ==
=== Early career ===
In the early 1990s, Redford divided his time between writing for television and acting in commercials. During this time, he co-wrote — with Ed Redlich — the Lifetime Television Christmas movie Ebbie, which starred Susan Lucci. His first job writing scripts for prime-time television was for the 1995 Fox TV sitcom Partners.

=== The West Wing ===
Redford was hired by Aaron Sorkin to write for the ABC comedy-drama Sports Night. Redford next joined the writing team for Sorkin on the NBC political drama The West Wing .

On The West Wing, Redford co-wrote (with Sorkin and Lawrence O'Donnell ) the episode "Take This Sabbath Day", which won the 2001 Humanitas Prize in the 60 Minute Network or Syndicated Television category. In addition to the Humanitas Prize, this episode was nominated for a Writers Guild of America Award for Television: Episodic Drama in 2000.

Redford and Sorkin were again nominated for the WGA Award 60-minute episodic drama in 2001 for The West Wing: "Somebody's Going to Emergency, Somebody's Going to Jail", and in 2002 for The West Wing: "Game On".

Redford was promoted to supervising producer in the second season of The West Wing. He and his fellow producers won a Primetime Emmy Award for Outstanding Drama Series for The West Wing in 2003. The production team was nominated for an Emmy Award again for work on The West Wing in 2004, the series’ fifth season.

=== Other Work ===
Redford worked as an executive producer for LAX, The Unit, and Vanished. He was a consulting producer on Kevin Falls's series Journeyman. In 2008, Redford joined the crew of Dirty Sexy Money as a writer and co-executive producer. In 2010, he wrote the Big Love fourth-season episode "The Greater Good" and was the co-executive producer for two episodes in the series. Redford and the writing team for The Newsroom (Brendan Fehily, David M. Handelman, Cinque Henderson, Ian Reichbach, Amy Rice, Aaron Sorkin, Gideon Yago) were nominated for the 2012 Writers Guild of America Award for Television: New Series.

During 2014-2015, Redford worked as a writer and producer for Madam Secretary, starring Téa Leoni. From 2016-2018 he worked on Designated Survivor, starring Kiefer Sutherland. In 2023, Redford began work as a writer and co-executive producer for When Calls the Heart, a Hallmark Channel series in its 10th season, developed by Michael Landon Jr.

== Filmography ==
=== Producer ===
Year	Show	Role	Notes
2023	When Calls the Heart	Co-executive producer	Season 10
2021	Radley	Executive producer	Short film
2016–2018	Designated Survivor	Co-executive producer	Seasons 1–2
2014–2015	Madam Secretary	Consulting producer	Season 1
2012	The Newsroom	Co-executive producer	Season 1
2009	Dirty Sexy Money	Co-executive producer	Season 2
2008	Dirty Sexy Money	Co-executive producer	Season 2
2007	Journeyman	Consulting producer	Season 1
2006	The Unit	Co-executive producer	Season 1
2006	Vanished	Executive producer	Season 1
2004	LAX	Co-executive producer	Season 1
2004	The West Wing	Supervising producer	Season 5
2003	The West Wing	Supervising producer	Season 5
2003	The West Wing	Supervising producer	Season 4
2002	The West Wing	Producer	Season 4
2002	The West Wing	Producer	Season 3
2001	The West Wing	Co-producer	Season 3
2001	The West Wing	Co-producer	Season 2
2000	The West Wing	Co-producer	Season 2

=== Writer ===
Year	Show	Episode	Notes
2023	When Calls the Heart	2 episodes	Season 10
2016–2017	Designated Survivor	8 episodes	
2014–2015	Madam Secretary	3 episodes	
2013	Suits	She's Mine	Season 3, episode 7
2010	Big Love	The Greater Good	Season 4, episode 2
2009	Dirty Sexy Money	"The Unexpected Arrival"	Season 2, episode 12
2008	Dirty Sexy Money	"The Injured Party"	Season 2, episode 6, co-written with Sallie Patrick
2007	Journeyman	"Keepers"	Season 1, episode 6
2006	Vanished	"Drop"	Season 1, episode 3
2006	The Unit	"Morale, Welfare and Recreation"	Season 1, episode 12
2006	The Unit	"Unannounced"	Season 1, episode 10
2006	The Unit	"Dedication"	Season 1, episode 7
2006	The Unit	"Non-Permissive Environment"	Season 1, episode 5
2004	LAX	"Finnegan Again, Begin Again"	Season 1, episode 2
2003	The West Wing	"Separation of Powers"	Season 5, episode 7
2003	The West Wing	"Life on Mars"	Season 4, episode 21
2003	The West Wing	"Privateers"	Season 4, episode 18
2002	The West Wing	"Game On"	Season 4, episode 6
2002	The West Wing	"Enemies Foreign and Domestic"	Season 3, episode 19
2002	The West Wing	"Dead Irish Writers"	Season 3, episode 16
2001	The West Wing	"On the Day Before"	Season 3, episode 5
2001	The West Wing	"Somebody's Going to Emergency, Somebody's Going to Jail"	Season 2, episode 16
2001	The West Wing	"The Leadership Breakfast "	Season 2, episode 11
2000	The West Wing	"The Portland Trip"	Season 2, episode 7
2000	The West Wing	"The White House Pro-Am"	Season 1, episode 17
2000	The West Wing	"Take This Sabbath Day"	Season 1, episode 14
1999	The West Wing	"The State Dinner"	Season 1, episode 7
1999	Sports Night	"Ordnance Tactics"	Season 1, episode 20
1999	Sports Night	"Small Town"	Season 1, episode 13
1996	Coach	"Grimmworld"	Season 9, episode 6
1996	Partners	"Hello? Harmless?"	Season 1, episode 19
1996	Partners	"The Year of Bob?"	Season 1, episode 13
1995	Partners	"Why Are the Blumenthals Living in My House?"	Season 1, episode 5
