= Pilot (The West Wing) =

- The West Wing episode
- Episode no.: Season 1 Episode 1
- Directed by: Thomas Schlamme
- Written by: Aaron Sorkin
- Production code: 475151
- Original air date: September 22, 1999

Guest appearances
- Annie Corley as Mary Marsh; Lisa Edelstein as Laurie; Suzy Nakamura as Cathy; Allison Smith as Mallory O'Brien; Marc Grapey as Billy; Janel Moloney as Donna Moss; F. William Parker as Rev. Al Caldwell

Episode chronology
← Previous —	Next → "Post Hoc, Ergo Propter Hoc"
- The West Wing season 1

"Pilot" is the first episode of the American serial drama The West Wing. The episode aired on September 22, 1999 on NBC.

== Plot ==
The White House staff is being called into work early to deal with the press fallout after President Josiah Bartlet has crashed his bicycle into a tree. As the staff try to perform damage control, it is revealed that Deputy Chief of Staff Josh Lyman made a gaffe when, after provocation by Christian activist Mary Marsh on a recent televised debate, quipped "Lady, the God you pray to is too busy being indicted for tax fraud." Also, Deputy Communications Director Sam Seaborn spends an evening with Laurie (Lisa Edelstein), unaware that she's a call girl, and then tells Chief of Staff Leo McGarry's daughter, Mallory O'Brien, about it before he knows whose daughter she is.

While Lyman and Marsh are discussing a proposed public debate on one of several religious wedge issues, President Bartlet enters and corrects one of the attendees on a theological point (namely, he quotes the First Commandment, settling a dispute on which one it is). He explains that he crashed his bicycle while distracted by anger after discovering that his granddaughter, after expressing herself as pro-choice during a magazine interview, was mailed a Raggedy Ann doll with a knife stuck in its throat. The doll was sent by an extremist group whose activities the attendees, to his displeasure, have not denounced. He tells them that not only will there be no debate, but that they will denounce the extremists publicly, and are barred from the White House until they do so. Bartlet implies to Lyman that he will be allowed to keep his job despite the gaffe.

== Reception ==
In a retrospective, Brittany Frederick of CBR called it the best pilot in television history, citing the episode's character development and world-building. Steve Heisler of The A.V. Club gave the episode an A−, explaining that the episode "had [him] hooked almost instantly." Screen Rant's Amelia Brantley harbored ambivalent feelings, praising the writing, and Allison Janney and Bradley Whitford's acting, while opining that the episode "hasn't aged well" in multiple aspects. Under the Media Research Center, L. Brent Bozell III critiqued the episode and wrote that he felt it had promoted anti-Catholicism.

== Awards ==
- The pilot was nominated for an ASC award.

=== Emmy Awards ===
Won

- Outstanding Art Direction for a Single-Camera Series (recipients: Tony Fanning, Jon Hutman, and Ellen Totleben)
- Outstanding Cinematography for a Single-Camera Series (recipient: Thomas Del Ruth, A.S.C.)
- Outstanding Directing for a Drama Series (recipient: Thomas Schlamme)

Nominated

- Outstanding Writing for a Drama Series (nominee: Aaron Sorkin; "In Excelsis Deo," in the same category, won)
