= Donna Moss =

American TV character, created 1999

- The West Wing character
- Janel Moloney as Donna Moss
- First appearance: "Pilot"
- Last appearance: "Tomorrow"
- Created by: Aaron Sorkin
- Portrayed by: Janel Moloney

In-universe information
- Full name: Donnatella Moss
- Gender: Female
- Title: Chief of Staff to the First Lady
- Occupation: Senior Assistant to the White House Deputy Chief of Staff (seasons 1-6); Russell Campaign Senior Aide (season 6); Santos Campaign Spokeswoman (season 7); Chief of Staff to the First Lady (end of season 7)
- Family: Unnamed mother, unnamed father.
- Spouse: Josh Lyman (boyfriend)
- Religion: Protestant, denomination unspecified
- Nationality: American/Canadian

Donnatella Moss is a fictional character played by Janel Moloney on the television serial drama The West Wing. During most of the series, Donna works for White House Deputy Chief of Staff Josh Lyman as a senior assistant (or, as she jokingly calls herself in one episode, the "deputy deputy chief of staff"), until she quits her job to work for the presidential campaign of Bob Russell in season 6. Although all the senior staffs' assistants are continuing characters with personal backgrounds, Donna is the best defined and most often featured staff member on the assistant level, and her difficult, semi-romantic relationship with Josh is a recurring plotline throughout the show. She later works for Bob Russell's campaign for President as a spokeswoman, taking the same job for Matt Santos's campaign after Russell loses the primary.

== Creation and development ==
Donna was initially scripted as a minor character, having only two lines in the pilot episode. However, as Aaron Sorkin remarked, "Janel turned a recurring character who has a couple of lines every once in a while into what became a weekly set piece: the Josh-Donna Scene." By the third episode, Donna's onscreen chemistry with Josh Lyman had convinced the producers to make the opening scene feature her character engaging in back-and-forth dialogue with Josh about a message from C.J. Janel Moloney quipped in the same interview that "I think I maybe quit my job after that", meaning that she would be staying with the show after that scene. Donna was still credited as a recurring character during the first season due to the uncertainty, but she appears in every episode of that season, and Janel Moloney was credited as a full cast member from the second season onward.

During the first four seasons, Donna's relationship with Josh Lyman remains in stasis, with neither daring to make any real romantic move on the other. Aaron Sorkin admits that he was more inclined to move the relationship forward, but, every time he discussed the possibility, fellow executive producer Thomas Schlamme would shout, "No! Wait another year!" "Besides", adds Sorkin, "Sexual and romantic tension is, to me, much more fun than taking the tension away by having the sex and romance".

== Character role ==
A script of the pilot episode provided by Warner Bros. to an interviewer introduces Donna as "Josh's assistant... devoted to Josh and hates admitting it." As Josh's assistant, Donna's role in the show consisted primarily of interactions with Josh for the first five seasons, until she quits her job to work for Bob Russell's campaign for President on the show. Donna's relationship with Josh was one of the ways the show could explore both sides of an issue on the show; often featuring Donna asking questions to Josh so that he can provide information to both Donna and the audience. During her time as Josh's assistant, her flirtatious onscreen chemistry with Josh garnered attention, with The Associated Press describing Donna's role in the show as "Josh's pokerfaced foil" and "mother hen." Other characters within the show occasionally speculate on the pair's relationship; When Donna encourages Josh to ask Joey Lucas on a date, Joey guesses that Donna is attempting to cover her own feelings for Josh through misdirection. In the Season 7 episode "The Cold," Josh and Donna kiss passionately as she brings him the good news that Congressman Santos has caught up to Vinick and that they are tied in the national tracking polls. In "Election Day," Josh and Donna consummate their relationship, sleeping together twice, both times at her initiative. In the Season 7 episode "Transition," Donna spends the night at his apartment and gives Josh four weeks to figure out "what they want from each other." Josh attempts to recruit Sam Seaborn to be his deputy. Sam agrees on the condition that Josh takes a vacation. In one of the last scenes of the episode, Josh is joined by Donna on a plane to his vacation site. In the series finale "Tomorrow," Josh and Donna wake up in bed together on the morning of Inauguration Day.

== Reaction and influence ==
Entertainment Weekly described Donna as "undoubtedly one of The West Wing's most indelible characters."

The Atlantic ranked Donna as 39th on their list of every character in The West Wing, describing her as "Easily the most controversial of the core cast members not named 'Mandy.'"

The Washington Post focuses on Donna's romantic tension with Josh Lyman, writing that while Josh and Donna's relationship was perceived as positively romantic in the time it was released, viewing the show after the Me Too movement soured the story. They named it "The Donna Problem"–that society and culture have moved on from what was acceptable a short while ago, and that well-written shows can still be relics of that older time.
