= Sam Seaborn =

American TV character, created 1999

Samuel Seaborn
- The West Wing character
- Rob Lowe as Sam Seaborn
- First appearance: "Pilot"
- Last appearance: "Tomorrow"
- Created by: Aaron Sorkin
- Portrayed by: Rob Lowe

In-universe information
- Nicknames: Princeton (Secret Service code name), Schmutzy Pants (by Mallory)
- Gender: Male
- Occupation: Deputy White House Communications Director (seasons 1-4); Deputy White House Chief of Staff (last episode of season 7)
- Family: Unnamed father
- Spouse: an ex-fiancée - Lisa Sherborne
- Nationality: American
- Alma Mater: Princeton University; Duke Law School

Samuel Norman Seaborn is a fictional character played by Rob Lowe on the television serial drama The West Wing. From the beginning of the series in 1999 until the middle of the fourth season in 2003, he is deputy White House Communications Director in the administration of President Josiah Bartlet played by Martin Sheen. The character departed with six episodes left in season four after Lowe decided to leave the series, although he returned for two episodes in the final season, including the series finale, where he became White House Deputy Chief of Staff to the new president portrayed by Jimmy Smits.

Series creator Aaron Sorkin originally conceived Sam Seaborn as the main character in The West Wing. The pilot episode makes him the main protagonist and he remains a focal point through the first season. However, as other characters developed—particularly Sheen's role as president and his ability to govern despite obstacles such as his previously undisclosed multiple sclerosis, his campaign for re-election, foreign policy, and terrorism—this greatly diminished the emphasis on the Seaborn character. When the series started, Lowe was the series' highest paid actor. However, due to the change in plot direction over subsequent seasons, many cast members negotiated or received significant pay increases as their roles expanded, while Lowe did not see any change. Unhappy with the situation, Lowe decided to leave the series in season 4, only returning for two episodes in season 7.

== Casting ==
The role of Sam Seaborn was initially offered to actor Bradley Whitford, who had auditioned for the part of Josh Lyman. However, Whitford wanted and was eventually given the role of Josh, and the part of Sam went to Rob Lowe, whose audition, said show creator Aaron Sorkin, "left our jaws on the floor".

When the show premiered, Seaborn was considered the lead, and the pilot centered on the character. But the acclaimed cast of the show—including Allison Janney, Richard Schiff, Dulé Hill, John Spencer, Whitford, and Martin Sheen (whose role as president was initially scripted as a small role) and Stockard Channing (whose First Lady was initially scripted as a guest role)— were all strong actors and eventually Lowe's character was no longer the lead. Lowe and series creator Aaron Sorkin soon found themselves at odds over the network's meddling with the show, most notably the network demanding changes in the Sam Seaborn character. Eventually, Lowe left the series.

Lowe's performance as Seaborn received an Emmy nomination, two Golden Globes nominations, three Screen Actors Guild Awards nominations and a Satellite Award win.

== Character role and development ==
=== Early life and education ===
Sam grew up in Laguna Beach, California. He makes a reference to going to Dungeons & Dragons camp when he was younger in the episode "The Two Bartlets". Sam graduated magna cum laude from Princeton University and Duke University School of Law. He makes repeated references to his alma mater, especially in the earlier seasons, indicating a certain pride in his attendance there. "Princeton" is his Secret Service code name, and he mentions being the recording secretary of the Princeton Gilbert and Sullivan Society. He can speak Spanish, as seen in Season 3 episode "Ways and Means".

Sam attended Duke Law School and was the editor of the Duke Law Review (which, in reality, is known as the Duke Law Journal). While Josh Lyman is also a lawyer, and it is implied in the episode "And It's Surely to Their Credit" (by the statement "everyone in the room is a lawyer") that several other senior staffers are also attorneys, Sam is the only one of these shown actually practicing law (before, during, and after serving in the White House) and is the only one who is ever consulted on legal matters.

=== Career prior to the White House ===
Sam was a staffer for several congressmen and the Democratic Congressional Campaign Committee. He was also a practicing lawyer, working at the law firm of Dewey Ballantine in New York City before joining the fictional Gage Whitney Pace (aka "Gage Whitney"), reputedly the second biggest law firm in New York City. Sam worked there for seven years and was concentrating on helping an oil company with a deal that would protect them from litigation in the event of an oil spill when his "old friend" (though it is never made clear when or how they met) Josh Lyman comes to visit him. Josh is running John Hoynes' presidential campaign and comes to try to recruit Sam as a speechwriter. Sam declines, explaining that he is about to be made partner and is getting married soon (the engagement later fell through). Sam returns to work but, feeling guilty about the deal he is making, begins trying to convince the oil company to buy newer, better tankers than the ones they want, unleashing the wrath of his boss and jeopardising his promotion to partner. In the midst of this, Josh returns from a trip to New Hampshire during which he has seen Hoynes' dark-horse challenger, Jed Bartlet, speak to a small audience of voters. Josh has been sufficiently inspired to abandon Hoynes' campaign and go work for Bartlet, which in turn convinces Sam to do the same. Sam becomes part of the talented team of staffers who help Bartlet to a very unlikely victory in 1998.

=== Personality ===
Sam's tragically flawed romantic relationships are something of a theme of the series with Josh once describing Sam's love life as "a moveable feast". After joining the campaign, Sam broke up with his fiancée, Lisa Sherborne, whom he was planning to marry in September of that year (the joke was that they broke up so that her name wouldn't become Lisa Sherborne Seaborn). Sam's other romantic relationships include a high-priced call girl named Laurie, played by Lisa Edelstein (with whom he slept without knowledge of her profession), and Leo McGarry's daughter, Mallory O'Brien, a fourth-grade teacher — a relationship Leo jokingly tries to sabotage, telling Sam, "I don't mind you dating my 'only' daughter, but you can't expect me not to have some fun along the way." Sam's trademark — both his greatest strength and greatest flaw — is his unflinching idealism. His unwavering faith in and love for the American political process and the positive impact that government can have in its citizens' lives define his character. Sam believes in doing the right thing simply because it is right, even when the consequences might be politically disastrous. This often causes him to clash with the other members of the senior staff, who tend to be more practical when approaching political problems. Occasionally Sam's idealism and faith in people are disappointed, to which he reacts very strongly. In the second-season episode "Somebody's Going to Emergency, Somebody's Going to Jail", Sam finds out that his father has been having a 28-year affair while married to his mother, a revelation that deeply shakes his sense of what he can and cannot count on. This feeling is reinforced by his discovery that a White House staffer convicted of treason during the Cold War, who Sam has always believed was innocent, actually had been a spy.

Another trademark of Sam is his ability as a speechwriter. He is an extremely talented writer, one of the very few people Toby recognises as an equal in his field. Sam is seen in many episodes to rewrite speeches over and over, unwilling to put words in the President's mouth that he isn't completely satisfied with.

=== White House ===
After the election, Sam becomes Deputy White House Communications Director in the Bartlet Administration, often collaborating with White House Communications Director Toby Ziegler to write the President's most important public addresses, most notably States of the Union and his first inaugural address.

In an episode in the third season, Sam is awed by President Bartlet's foresight and wisdom when resolving an apparent impasse among the Chinese, the Taiwanese and the United States. President Bartlet predicts that Sam will run for president someday and should not be scared; Bartlet believes that he can do it.

=== Run for Congress ===
During the fourth season, Sam decides to run for Congress in his home district — the California 47th in Orange County, California — in a special election held after deceased Democratic candidate Horton Wilde posthumously makes history by defeating arch-conservative Republican incumbent Chuck Webb. Sam first becomes familiar with the congressional race when he is sent to talk to Wilde's campaign manager, Will Bailey, on behalf of the Democratic Party, to convince him to drop the campaign. Will continues running the campaign with earnestness and energy after Wilde died, an act that is seen as bizarre and pointless — or, as Sam puts it to him, "a national joke". After seeing firsthand how dedicated Will is and realizing that he is a public servant in the mould of Bartlet's own senior staff, Sam becomes impressed with how he ran Wilde's campaign and offers his own name as a replacement candidate for election night in case Wilde wins, not thinking he will have to honor the promise. When Wilde does win, Sam decides not to back out but to use this opportunity to promote a truly liberal agenda in the traditionally conservative district. He goes to California with the blessing of Bartlet and his fellow White House staffers. Once he learns that Will Bailey is not going to stay on to manage his campaign, he recommends him as a temporary replacement for himself in the White House, to help Toby write Bartlet's second inaugural address.

Sam is expected to lose in a landslide. President Bartlet goes to California to lend his support, taking with him Sam's friends on the senior staff, who believe campaign manager Scott Holcomb is wasting Sam's time by having him run a safe, timid campaign. In the midst of the visit, Sam learns that Bartlet is putting off announcing the Democratic tax plan Sam himself had helped design, so that Sam won't feel pressured to support it and further stigmatize himself during the election. Sam is appalled and decides to put things right. While introducing the President at a campaign event, he adds that the audience shouldn't "let him off this stage" until he has announced the tax plan. Backstage, Bartlet watches Scott Holcomb react with distress and asks why he is running Sam's campaign the way he is. Holcomb admits that he is anticipating Sam's loss and trying to smooth the way for a less divisive candidate the next time around, prompting Bartlet to (unofficially) fire him and get Toby to take over the campaign for the final weeks. Toby runs a thoroughly honest and liberal campaign, not until the very end of which does Sam realize, "I'm going to lose". Toby confirms it, explaining, "They're going to throw rocks at you next week, and I wanted to be standing next to you when they did." They hug, and this is the last scene in which Sam appears until the end of the final season of the series.

When Sam does reappear, it is implied that Sam lost the election to Congressman Webb, and then declined the promotion to Senior Counselor to the President that had been suggested by Toby. Instead, he quit politics, remained in his home state of California, and joined an unnamed law firm in Los Angeles which pays him a salary that would "make [Josh] puke".

=== Return to the White House ===
Although Sam is mentioned occasionally following his departure (most notably calling Josh to tell him to "roll with the punches" after Josh unwittingly caused the defection of a Democratic senator), he is not seen in the series again until the last episodes of the seventh and final season, following the election of Congressman Matt Santos as president.

In a development reminiscent of his recruitment of Sam into Josiah Bartlet's campaign for the presidency eight years earlier^{(Ep 23)}, Josh Lyman (now Chief of Staff-designate in the incoming Santos Administration) flies to Los Angeles on a same day round trip to offer Sam the post of Deputy White House Chief of Staff. Although initially hesitant because he is again engaged, Sam ultimately agrees as he later sees that Santos is part of a bright future for the country. Sam accepts on the condition that Josh take a vacation after witnessing the toll of post-election stress, insisting that Josh will need to be at his best when helping govern the country.

Sam's final appearance of the series comes in the final episode, meeting with new President Matt Santos and Josh Lyman in the Oval Office.

== See also ==
- The West Wing
- List of characters on The West Wing
- List of The West Wing episodes
