= Toby Ziegler =

Character in The West Wing

Tobias Zachary Ziegler
- The West Wing character
- Richard Schiff as Toby Ziegler in “The West Wing”
- First appearance: "Pilot"
- Last appearance: "Institutional Memory"
- Created by: Aaron Sorkin
- Portrayed by: Richard Schiff

In-universe information
- Nicknames: Toby, Pokey (Andrea Wyatt), Tobas (C. J. Cregg)
- Gender: Male
- Occupation: White House Communications Director (Seasons 1-7)
- Family: Jules "Julie" Ziegler (father), Dr David Ziegler (brother, deceased), two older sisters
- Spouse: Andrea Wyatt (divorced before series started)
- Children: Molly and Huck
- Religion: Jewish
- Nationality: American

Tobias "Toby" Zachary Ziegler is a fictional character in the television serial drama The West Wing, played by Richard Schiff. The role of Toby Ziegler earned actor Richard Schiff the Primetime Emmy Award for Outstanding Supporting Actor in a Drama Series in 2000. For most of the series' duration, he was White House Communications Director. In the final season, Ziegler was involved in a storyline around a leak of classified information, which The New York Times compared to the leak investigation of the Valerie Plame affair.

== Creation and development ==
According to series creator Aaron Sorkin, Schiff was cast in the role of Toby Ziegler over many other actors who auditioned, including Eugene Levy. Schiff created a backstory for the character as a widower and wore his own wedding ring. Sorkin and fellow executive producer Thomas Schlamme were planning for the character to be divorced, and did not notice until the show's eighth episode. "I had always imagined that his first wife had died, which accounts for his sadness, and why someone would devote himself to public service and be so singular about it", Schiff said. "But then, Aaron and Tommy threw that right out the window."

Schiff had publicly praised the show's writers, and creator Aaron Sorkin in particular, for the characters' richness in the series. However, during the show's final season, Schiff said he felt let down by the writers as some of his episodes were cut "purely on a financial decision." He was particularly critical of the military shuttle leak storyline, which saw his character indicted for leaking classified information. "Toby would never in 10 million years have betrayed the president in that fashion," Schiff said. "Even if he had, there would have been seven episodes' worth of fights before he did it." He justified the story to himself by reasoning that Toby was covering for somebody else.

== Character biography ==
The character is Jewish and grew up in the New York City borough of Brooklyn with an immigrant father who was a convicted member of Murder, Inc., the Jewish mafia's enforcement arm, a background in part inspired by Richard Schiff's own family history. Before joining the Bartlet presidential campaign, Toby was a professional political operative who worked for various campaigns, including New York City Council seats, Bronx Borough President and U.S. House and Senate races. It is implied in the episode "And It's Surely to Their Credit" (by the statement "everyone in the room is a lawyer") that Toby has a law degree.

Toby is rather morose, yet he is something of an idealist, often less willing than his colleagues and the president to compromise his political values. He is shown to be a more than formidable opponent in an argument, easily able to hold his own against even Bartlet himself. He is also known for his acerbic wit.

== Plot ==
=== Season 1 ===
In season 1, Toby Ziegler is Communications Director and senior domestic policy advisor to President Bartlet. Season 1 begins in their first year in office, detailing the teams' efforts to pass legislation despite unfavorable political circumstances and a powerless administration in the face of the opposition. Toby works with his ex-wife Andrea "Andy" Wyatt, a member of the House of Representatives, on criminal justice legislation. The season ends on a cliffhanger with an assassination attempt but no information on who has been hit.

=== Season 2 ===
Season 2 details President Bartlet's second and third years in office. The season begins with the assassination attempt from the last episode of the prior season. After the attack, Toby is in a morose mood and eager to punish hate groups he sees as responsible for the assassination attempt. It is revealed once in the White House, Toby was rewarded for his work on the campaign, with Bartlet naming him Communications Director and senior domestic policy advisor. In episode 18, Toby argues with the President after finding out about the latter's multiple sclerosis diagnosis. Later in the season, he reveals the news to less senior members of the team.

=== Season 3 ===
The third season covers the second half of Bartlet's first term and begins with the news that he was seeking re-election. It is revealed that Toby's mother has been dead for 12 years. Both he and his father mention sisters, who Toby said took him to protest rallies in the mid-1960s, as well as nieces and nephews. His younger brother, David, is a mission specialist at NASA who dies by suicide after learning that he has terminal cancer. Toby also refers to a grandfather who lived to be 96 years old, but for the last 20 years of his life, "thought the Habsburgs still lived in a big palace in Vienna."

=== Season 4 ===
In season 4, the team surrounding President Bartlet deal with their second election campaign - which they win halfway through the season - on the foreign affairs front, a genocide and assassination of a foreign political leader, and the abduction of the president's daughter. Toby's ex-wife gave birth to their twins toward the end of the season.

In Episode 19, Toby says that his draft number for Vietnam was not called. Toby was married to Andrea Wyatt, who serves as a congresswoman from Maryland. They divorced during the first year of the Bartlet administration after unsuccessful attempts to have children. However, toward the end of the Bartlet re-election campaign, Andy became pregnant with twins. Toby subsequently pursues a renewed relationship with Andy. After his initial proposals of marriage are rejected, and imagining that she was making him chase her, he sets about attempting to eradicate the behaviors that Andy had found irritating in the past. He forces himself to eat salads, and sells his bachelor pad, buying Andy the property she had always considered her "dream house." Andy was mortified by the gesture, refusing his proposal once more and telling him that he is "too sad" for her. Moments later, her water breaks, and the twins—a boy and a girl—are born shortly thereafter. Huck is named for Andy's grandfather, and Molly for Molly O'Connor, a U.S. Secret Service agent who is killed in the line of duty on the day of their birth.

=== Season 5 ===
The fifth season opens with the rescue of the kidnapped Zoey Bartlet. Before, Toby was seen to prepare two speeches, covering both the possibility of her death and her rescue. In episode 4, Toby and Will mock the Vice President, their mocking revealed as the remarks are inadvertently shown on the President's teleprompter.

His most notable accomplishment was "fixing" Social Security, the sixth year of the Bartlet administration. He thinks of it early one morning, almost resigns after it was leaked by the senator who he is persuading to break with partisan politics, but then fixes it with the help of Josh Lyman.

=== Season 6 ===
After C. J. Cregg's promotion from Press Secretary to White House Chief of Staff, he also serves as the de facto White House Press Secretary in addition to his role as Communications Director. Toby initially has trouble facing the press in the new role and makes several gaffes, but learns to perform well with the help of new Deputy Press Secretary Annabeth Schott.

When Will Bailey leaves the president's staff to work for the vice president, Toby interprets the move as a betrayal and develops an antagonistic attitude toward Will that never is truly fixed (they simply go from being constantly at odds to having little or nothing to do with each other, though Will was shocked and left near tears when a devastated C. J. tells him about the shuttle leak and installs him as the new Director of Communications). Similarly, when Josh leaves the White House to run a presidential campaign for Matt Santos, Toby views this as a betrayal and remains extremely hostile to Josh until long after. His reaction is eventually explained by the revelation that his brother David, recently diagnosed with terminal cancer, took his own life rather than live what time he had left: "He could have had years. But instead, he just dropped everything and walked away." Toby feels "walking away" is what Josh has also done. Josh later (successfully) moved to keep their friendship alive, and Toby kept advising Josh as he tries to get Santos elected president.

In the episode "Things Fall Apart," the International Space Station develops a critical oxygen leak. With no civilian shuttles available to perform a rescue mission in time, a three-person crew finds itself trapped aboard the ISS. While the president contemplated rescue options, C. J. becomes aware of the possibility that a secret military space shuttle could be prepared in time to rescue the crew. However, this would involve revealing the shuttle's existence, particularly as one of the ISS crew was a Russian military officer. C. J. shared her speculation with several senior White House staff, including Toby. The information is leaked to Greg Brock, a reporter for The New York Times, which triggered a full-scale investigation.

=== Season 7 ===
In the episode "Mr. Frost", Toby admitted to C. J. that he leaked the classified information, which estranges the two. He knew that if the military shuttle's existence became public knowledge, the public would demand the safe return of the astronauts, which is what ultimately occurred. White House Counsel Oliver Babish debriefs Toby until his lawyer ends the interview. Toby reveals that he discussed the possible existence of the shuttle with C. J., but does not state that C. J. initiated the conversation. Toby offered his resignation to Bartlet, but Bartlet does not accept the resignation because he must dismiss Toby "for cause". Babish waits with Toby before he was escorted out of the White House, saying that someone should at least thank Toby for his years of service and waited with him to soften the blow.

Toby attends Leo McGarry's funeral, but sits in the back of the church to avoid press coverage. He was similarly unable to attend Leo's burial at Arlington National Cemetery because of the press circus his attendance would cause. Later C. J. is at an impasse about what to do after the administration's time ends and visits Toby. The two have a heartfelt reconciliation, with Toby advising her to take a leap of faith when C. J. finds herself at a personal and professional crossroad. Despite strong mixed emotions, Bartlet's final official act as president is to pardon Toby and thus spare him from having to serve his prison sentence. In the episode "The Ticket", a flash forward reveals that, at the time of the dedication of Bartlet's presidential library three years later, Toby had been teaching at Columbia University. Toby had been invited to the dedication by Bartlet and it appeared they have moved on from the shuttle leak incident with Toby quietly having offered to help Bartlet write his speech for the dedication. Schiff had rationalised that the leak had in fact came from Toby's recently deceased astronaut brother, David, an idea hinted at in-show in a later scene between Toby and his ex-wife Andy; in the episode"Welcome to Wherever You Are" it was left hanging whether Bartlet and Ziegler's reconciliation in the 'flash forward' may have been enabled by his becoming aware of Toby having actually protected the reputation of his brother, or the passage of time since the incident simply allowed tempers to cool.

== See also ==
- List of characters on The West Wing
- List of The West Wing episodes
