= Leo McGarry =

American TV character, created 1999

- The West Wing character
- John Spencer as Leo McGarry
- First appearance: "Pilot"
- Last appearance: "The Cold"
- Created by: Aaron Sorkin
- Portrayed by: John Spencer; Sterling K. Brown (A West Wing Special to Benefit When We All Vote)

In-universe information
- Gender: Male
- Occupation: United States Secretary of Labor (pre-season 1), White House Chief of Staff (seasons 1–6), Counselor to the President (season 6), Vice Presidential Candidate (season 7), Vice President–elect of the United States (posthumous, season 7)
- Spouse: Jenny McGarry (divorced 2000)
- Children: Mallory O'Brien
- Relatives: Josephine McGarry (sister), Elizabeth (sister)
- Religion: Episcopalian
- Nationality: American

Leo Thomas McGarry is a fictional character of the NBC political drama series The West Wing, portrayed by American actor John Spencer.

McGarry was the former Secretary of Labor, former White House Chief of Staff, Senior Counselor to Democratic President Josiah Bartlet, and Democratic Vice Presidential nominee for the 2006 election. The role earned Spencer the Primetime Emmy Award for Outstanding Supporting Actor in a Drama Series in 2002, from five total nominations over the course of the show.

== Creation and development ==
In crafting the character of Leo McGarry, series creator Aaron Sorkin said he envisioned John Spencer in the part but did not think he would be available. Although Spencer had recently decided he did not want to act in another TV drama series because of the long hours, he was so impressed by the pilot script that he took the part. Like the character, Spencer was a recovering alcoholic, and said he found he could relate to McGarry because "Leo's in recovery, too."

In an earlier draft of the pilot script, dated February 6, 1998, McGarry is called "Leo Jacobi" and is described as being aged 55 and "professorial".

== Character biography ==
=== Early life ===
In The West Wing, Leo McGarry is from Chicago, Illinois. In addition, character Josh Lyman refers to a family connection of Leo's in Boston, Massachusetts when discussing the latter’s alcoholism. He is of Irish and Scottish ancestry and has at least two sisters, Elizabeth and Josephine, the latter serving as a school district superintendent in Atlanta. During the first season, his wife of several decades, Jenny, divorces him due to his workaholic nature, prioritizing his job in the White House over his marriage. They share one daughter, Mallory O'Brien, a fourth-grade teacher. McGarry, a recovering alcoholic and Valium addict, comes from a family with a history of alcoholism, including his father, who committed suicide. He also speaks Spanish.

McGarry is a U.S. Air Force veteran who achieved the rank of colonel and served in the Vietnam War. During the war, he flew an F-105 Thunderchief and was shot down and wounded; his friend and fellow pilot Ken O'Neill carried him on his back in the jungle for three days. Prior to working in the White House, McGarry had been Secretary of Labor during a presidency prior to the beginning of the show. McGarry amassed significant wealth during his time in the private sector as a member of the board of directors of a defense contractor, Mueller-Wright Aeronautics, with his friend Ken O'Neill, for ten or twelve years. On more than one occasion, it is suggested that he is the wealthiest member of the staff - worth even more than the President himself. It is implied in the episode "And It's Surely to Their Credit" (by the statement "everyone in the room is a lawyer") that McGarry has a law degree. He attended the University of Michigan.

=== White House Chief of Staff ===
In 1997, Leo travels to New Hampshire in an attempt to persuade his old friend Governor Josiah Bartlet to run for the Democratic presidential nomination. Having persuaded Bartlet, McGarry becomes his campaign manager and general chairman of the "Bartlet For America" campaign, hiring Josh Lyman, Toby Ziegler, C.J. Cregg, and Sam Seaborn as advisors. Eventually, Governor Bartlet, who was considered to be an insurgent candidate by the media, defeats Senator John Hoynes of Texas for the nomination, and goes on to win the presidency, appointing McGarry as his chief of staff.

As President Bartlet's top advisor, McGarry has an office adjacent to the Oval Office and sits in with the President in the Situation Room. McGarry is very involved in the formation of policy and the day-to-day operations of the White House and its staff. Some of his inspirations include "Big Block of Cheese Day," where groups that would normally not be considered for White House attention get to have meetings with senior staffers, and a plan to make the staffers submit two-page reports on policy issues or get ignored. On more than one occasion, McGarry is said to be the man who "runs the country" and is treated with great respect by people on both sides of the aisle. When President Bartlet is giving instructions to the Cabinet member who is appointed the designated survivor during the State of the Union address, he asks the man if he has a best friend, if that friend is smarter than he is, and if he could trust that friend with his life. The Cabinet member says yes on all counts. Bartlet then says, "That's your Chief of Staff," not aware McGarry has heard him in the next room.

In season six, during a Middle East peace negotiation at Camp David, McGarry finds it impossible to support Bartlet's position about sending thousands of American soldiers to Jerusalem as part of an Israeli-Palestinian agreement, and Bartlet and McGarry come to an agreement that McGarry will resign at the first available opportunity. Minutes after the conversation, McGarry suffers a near-fatal heart attack and collapses while walking alone in the grounds. He is resuscitated, survives, and later returns to work after Bartlet's last State of the Union address in a new role as Senior Counselor to the President. McGarry is succeeded as chief of staff by his personal recommendation, C. J. Cregg, who previously served as the White House Press Secretary.

=== Senior Counselor to the President ===
As Senior Counselor, Leo encourages staffers to present new ideas and resurrect old policy initiatives that have been abandoned out of political necessity, insisting that they could "accomplish more in one day in the White House than in a lifetime" once they leave. He maintains a board in his office that shows how many days remain for the Administration and the initiatives which have been proposed. Among these initiatives are a serious attempt at health care reform, new foreign policy approaches in Latin America, and trying to convince Congress to enact an earned income tax credit (called by Charlie Young and Annabeth Schott a 'poor tax' to make it easier to defend). Leo also leads an attempt to open negotiations between the US and Cuba to lift the blockade and reestablish diplomatic relations, an issue which faces significant opposition from Republicans, Democrats, and the intelligence community. The initiative is eventually endorsed by President Bartlet in a televised address to the nation, vindicating Leo's efforts and allowing him to accomplish what he had failed to do as Labor Secretary at a summit in 1995.

In the aftermath of Josh's departure to run Matt Santos's presidential campaign, Leo begins taking on some of the assignments from Josh's portfolio at C.J.'s request. However, he points out to her that Josh's departure has left a significant workload that requires a new Deputy White House Chief of Staff on a permanent basis. Seeing similarities with Josh, Leo champions lobbyist Cliff Calley to take over strategic planning and legislative affairs. Although C.J. is at first reluctant to hire the Republican to fill Josh's position, Leo convinces her that Cliff is a good man who once saved him and the Bartlet administration from being humiliated. C.J. later sees the similarities herself between Cliff and Josh and convinces him to take over as his replacement.

=== 2006 vice presidential campaign ===
Bartlet asks Leo to run the Democratic National Convention when it seems likely to deadlock. The Democratic Party's eventual presidential nominee, Congressman Matt Santos, selects McGarry as his vice-presidential nominee, a move that both Josh and Bartlet strongly endorse. This is particularly ironic, because McGarry had earlier insisted that Santos drop out of the race for the sake of party unity to allow a less impressive candidate (Vice President Robert Russell) to take on the nod. But McGarry allows Santos to make a closing speech that was so impressive that it helped put him over the top and become the party's presidential nominee. McGarry is not overly impressive on the campaign trail, because he is not familiar with playing the role of a candidate versus an advisor. However, he rebounds and becomes integral to the campaign, unofficially taking on the role of statesman.

In the episode "Running Mates", McGarry is being prepared for the only vice-presidential debate against West Virginia Governor Ray Sullivan. The debate prep is a disaster, and the Santos campaign worries that Leo will be defeated by Sullivan. The situation worsens when the news is leaked to the press. Despite renewed efforts by Josh and Lou, they are unable to make Leo any better at debating. However, on the night of the debate, Leo not only proves his debating skills but easily wins the debate against Sullivan. Afterwards, he reveals to Annabeth that he had been the one to leak his failed debate prep news to lower expectations.

McGarry's last screen appearance occurs in the episode "The Cold". Following a private meeting between McGarry and Bartlet in the Oval Office to discuss troop deployment in Kazakhstan, a scene which exhibits the closeness of their relationship, Josh Lyman asks him: "Everything okay?" McGarry answers with the character's last words on screen: "Yeah."

On Election Night, it is said that McGarry has gone up to his hotel room in Houston to take a nap before the results come in. He is later found unconscious by Annabeth Schott who alerts McGarry's Secret Service detail. He is rushed to the hospital, where he is pronounced dead. McGarry's death comes ninety minutes before the polls close in California and other Western states, thus giving some voters this information prior to casting their vote. A hard-line Republican strategist wants to bring up McGarry's death to benefit the Republican presidential nominee, Senator Arnold Vinick, but the visibly disgusted senator tells her that he has been friends with McGarry for decades and will do no such thing, win or lose. Despite McGarry's death, the Santos-McGarry ticket narrowly wins the election over the Vinick-Sullivan ticket by a 30,000-vote margin in Nevada and McGarry posthumously becomes the Vice President-elect after Santos's victory.

McGarry's funeral is held at the Washington National Cathedral, though the funeral was actually filmed at the Cathedral of Mary Our Queen in Baltimore, Maryland. President Bartlet, President-elect Matt Santos, Josh Lyman, Charlie Young, former DNC head Barry Goodwin, and McGarry's unnamed son-in-law serve as pallbearers. He was buried at Arlington National Cemetery.

=== Relationship with staff ===
He is characterized by the story he tells Josh Lyman in the second-season episode, "Noël":

This guy's walkin' down a street when he falls in a hole. The walls are so steep he can't get out. A doctor passes by and the guy shouts up, "Hey you! Can you help me out?" The doctor writes a prescription, throws it down in the hole, and moves on. Then a priest comes along and the guy shouts up, "Father, I'm down in this hole; can you help me out?" The priest writes out a prayer, throws it down in the hole and moves on. Then a friend walks by. "Hey, Joe, it's me. Can ya help me out?" And the friend jumps in the hole. Our guy says, "Are ya stupid? Now we're both down here." The friend says, "Yeah, but I've been down here before and I know the way out."

Spencer described his character's relationship with Lyman as a mentoring one, with McGarry seeing Lyman as a younger version of himself: "a workaholic, a person devoted to government service." He considered the world of The West Wing a boys' club at times, and felt McGarry could be harder on C. J. Cregg than he was on the male senior staffers.

Though apart from the opening credits he is not seen again onscreen, after his death McGarry's presence is felt in the series finale when his daughter presents a gift to President Bartlet that she found in his possessions. In the show's final scene, Bartlet opens the gift to find the napkin with the words "Bartlet For America", which McGarry had written to introduce to Bartlet the idea of running for president. Also, when Josh Lyman goes to see C.J. Cregg just before the Santos inauguration during the final episode, Lyman asks if she ever stopped thinking the office of the White House Chief of Staff as McGarry's office. Cregg replies "No." She then hands Lyman (the incoming White House Chief of Staff) a note with "WWLD?" on it, meaning "What would Leo do?"

== Influence of John Spencer's death ==
McGarry appears in two of the five episodes which had been filmed, but not yet aired, at the time of Spencer's death on December 16, 2005. The show's producers decided to let those episodes air in his memory. The character's death was written in response to the death of the actor, and McGarry is discovered dead offscreen in his hotel room. According to executive producer Lawrence O'Donnell, the writers originally intended for Vinick to win the election. However, the death of Spencer forced him and his colleagues to consider the emotional strain that would result from having Santos lose both his running mate and the election. It was eventually decided that the last episodes would be rescripted by John Wells. Other statements from Wells, however, have contradicted O'Donnell's claims about a previously planned Vinick victory. The script showing Santos winning was written long before the death of John Spencer. In 2008 O'Donnell stated that "We actually planned at the outset for Jimmy Smits to win, that was our plan of how this was all going to work, but the Vinick character came on so strong in the show, and was so effective, it became a real contest and it became a real contest in the West Wing writers' room." Governor Eric Baker (D-Pennsylvania), played by Ed O'Neill, was written in as Leo's vice presidential replacement, as chosen by President Santos.

In 2020, the surviving members of the cast reunited to film a special encore of 'Hartsfield's Landing' in celebration of the election and to encourage voting participation. The role of Leo McGarry was recast with Sterling K. Brown.

== Reception ==
Leon Panetta, who served as White House Chief of Staff under Bill Clinton (and later as Director of the Central Intelligence Agency and Secretary of Defense under Barack Obama), was impressed by the character, telling actor John Spencer that "Any administration that would have Leo McGarry as a White House Chief of Staff would be very, very fortunate." John Podesta, another former White House Chief of Staff, also praised Spencer's performance, saying, "John plays this role in a calm, thoughtful, kindhearted, and loyal manner" although he has commented that Leo is not mean enough.

=== On the subject of alcoholism ===
On the subject of the McGarry character's portrayal of alcoholism, journalist Aiden Mason has said:

The West Wing’s Leo McGarry explains addiction better than anything on TV ... I’d like to take you back to a scene from the very first season of West Wing in which Leo invites a young girl into his office to discuss an issue that many of us face: addiction. This particular scene revolves around substance abuse. If you watch closely, you’ll find it’s one of the most captivating scenes that gives one of the most accurate interpretations of the true nature of addicts and addiction itself.

Shelby Arnold said that in promoting public understanding, the Leo McGarry portrayal of alcoholism and addiction helped to weigh against some of the stigma caused by the "old Reagan-era" Just Say No campaign. The character showed alcoholism as a disease which was difficult to deal with, as opposed to a sin of temptation.

The Guardian takes a slightly different angle on it:

[In season 3, episode 9] Leo is pushed through the wringer ... His alcoholism is explored in excruciating detail, in the present and in flashbacks where he meets Bartlet for the first time. An episode about a man with an addictive personality unravelling due to the pressures of work, released eight months after Aaron Sorkin was arrested for felony drug possession, this one feels as if it's coming straight from the gut.

== See also ==
- List of characters on The West Wing
- List of The West Wing episodes
