= Josh Lyman =

American TV character, created 1999

Joshua Lyman
- The West Wing character
- Bradley Whitford as Josh Lyman
- First appearance: "Pilot"
- Last appearance: "Tomorrow"
- Created by: Aaron Sorkin
- Portrayed by: Bradley Whitford

In-universe information
- Nickname: Josh
- Occupation: White House Deputy Chief of Staff (seasons 1–6), Santos campaign manager (seasons 6–7), White House Chief of Staff (end of season 7)
- Family: Noah Lyman (father, deceased), Mother (alive), Joanie Lyman (older sister, deceased)
- Significant other: Donna Moss (girlfriend)
- Religion: Jewish
- Alma mater: Harvard University; Yale Law School

Joshua Lyman is a fictional character played by Bradley Whitford on the television drama series The West Wing. The role earned Whitford the Primetime Emmy Award for Outstanding Supporting Actor in a Drama Series in 2001. For most of the series, he is White House Deputy Chief of Staff and Chief Political Advisor in the Josiah Bartlet administration.

Josh is portrayed as having one of the sharpest minds on the President's staff; he is a witty, somewhat cocky, boyishly charming know-it-all.

== Creation and development ==
Aaron Sorkin, the creator of The West Wing, originally wrote Josh Lyman with long-time friend Whitford in mind. An early draft of the pilot script, dated February 6, 1998, describes Josh as being "a youthful 38" and "a highly regarded brain." After reading the script, Whitford said he loved the character immediately and "desperately wanted" the part. While his audition impressed the show's executive producers, with Sorkin describing it as "simply the best audition for anything I'd ever seen," Warner Brothers casting director John Levey was not convinced Whitford had enough sex appeal to play a lead character and executive producer Thomas Schlamme was concerned that he did not have enough depth to carry the more dramatic scenes. After a second audition, Whitford was offered the role of Sam Seaborn. Whitford called Sorkin for help. "I just said, 'Aaron, I just feel this very strongly. This is not about me wanting a job. This is the only time in my life I will play this card. I am this guy; I am not the other guy.'" Sorkin was impressed, and soon after Whitford was cast as Josh.

In researching the role, Whitford said he found former Clinton communications director George Stephanopoulos's book All Too Human very helpful, "just because it gave a sense of the sort of smell and the texture and the level of intimacy with the president, which I was just unaware of."

Josh shares his name with a character in the Garry Trudeau cartoon strip Doonesbury, a White House deputy cabinet liaison encountered by Doonesbury regular Joanie Caucus. A framed copy of a Doonesbury strip hangs in Josh's office. The character is said to be based in part on Rahm Emanuel, although executive producer Lawrence O'Donnell denies this claim. In the Season 1 episode, "Mandatory Minimums", Josh is called "Rambo" by one of the staff after an intense telephone conversation. In other instances, the character is said to be based on former Clinton advisor Paul Begala who notes that some of Josh's experiences in the first season are some of the same experiences he went through.

== Character biography ==
=== Personal history ===
Josh was born and raised in Westport, Connecticut. A Fulbright scholar, he graduated cum laude from Harvard University (where he worked at the Harvard Crimson), and Yale Law School, graduating c. 1984. Josh mentions that one of his classmates was the law professor Akhil Amar. He received a 760 on the verbal section of the SAT, which he has been known to boast about. However, when trying to explain his lack of skill in serious relationships, he claims that his IQ does not "break the bank," so he had to work hard in college, quipping that "by the time [his] roommates notched their 100th party of the year, I think I got my first full night of sleep."

Josh is a non-practicing Jew; his grandfather was held in the Nazi concentration camp Birkenau during World War II. He had an elder sister, Joanie, who died when he was a child. She was babysitting him when a fire broke out in her home and died trying to put out the fire while Josh ran outside - an event which continues to haunt Josh. His father, Noah Lyman, was a lawyer and old friend of Leo McGarry. Although Josh thinks his father would have preferred grandchildren to a son in politics, Noah was proud that Josh was working for Bartlet and often bragged about his son to his friends and neighbors. His father died in 1998 on the night of the Illinois primary, after developing an unexpected pulmonary embolism while undergoing chemotherapy for an unspecified form of cancer. His mother splits her time between Westport and West Palm Beach, Florida, before she moves to Florida full-time.

Though idealistic like every other member of the Bartlet administration, Josh is perhaps the most willing to resort to less-than-honorable tactics and on occasion suggests solutions and methods that others in the staff would not condone. He sometimes resorts to threats, intimidation, lies and even blackmail to achieve what needs to be done for the Bartlet administration.

=== Professional history ===
Before working for President Josiah Bartlet, Josh worked in several positions as an advisor and manager for Democratic politicians. Josh later became a staffer for then-Senator John Hoynes, the frontrunner for the Democratic nomination for president in the upcoming 1998 election. However, Hoynes's tendency to go against Josh's advice and to prioritize politics over his own ideas and convictions frustrated Josh. Thirteen weeks before the New Hampshire primary, Josh receives a visit from Leo McGarry, an old friend of his father's. At Leo's request, a skeptical Josh travels to New Hampshire to hear then-Governor Bartlet speak. After hearing Bartlet give a surprisingly honest answer to a politically sensitive question, Josh immediately leaves Hoynes' campaign to work for Bartlet; he also recruits his old friend Sam Seaborn to the campaign.

Shortly after joining the Bartlet for America campaign, Josh hires recent college dropout Donna Moss, who had been volunteering for the campaign, as his assistant. Donna remains as Josh's assistant until the sixth season. A largely unspoken friendship and romantic tension exists between the two for the majority of the series. In the first-season finale, Josh is critically wounded by gunfire during an assassination attempt on African-American presidential aide Charlie Young. Josh undergoes fourteen hours of surgery and is subsequently put through intensive psychotherapy with psychiatrist Stanley Keyworth after displaying symptoms of post-traumatic stress disorder, including raising his voice to President Bartlet in the Oval Office and breaking a window in his apartment.

Josh's position in the Bartlet administration is temporarily compromised after he leaks information to the press about an anonymous hold on military promotions placed by Idaho Senator Chris Carrick. Carrick tries to secure a promise from the White House that a missile defense system will be built in his home state, but Josh's competitive nature will not allow him to make a compromise. After the leak, Carrick releases the hold but resigns from the Democratic Party, informing Josh that he will seek re-election as a Republican and citing Josh as a key reason for his defection.

The resulting embarrassment to the administration and to the party leads Leo to leave Josh out of key budget negotiations, negotiations which eventually result in a complete shutdown of the federal government. Josh soon finds himself stripped of much of his political authority, as freelance political advisor Angela Blake takes up many of his duties. He eventually returns from isolation after the First Lady pointedly asks President Bartlet "Where's Josh?" Josh is the only senior staffer to support the President's firm stand against Speaker Jeff Haffley, and the President's eventual political victory over Haffley during this conflict is largely due to Josh's advice.

After John Hoynes publishes an autobiography praising Josh for his time in Hoynes' campaign and attempts to recruit Josh for another presidential run, he decides that he does not want Hoynes (or current Vice President Bob Russell) to be president, and instead convinces Texas Congressman Matt Santos to run for president, much in the same way Leo McGarry recruited Bartlet eight years earlier. Josh leaves his position at the White House to run Santos's presidential campaign, leaving his legislative portfolio to be taken up by Clifford Calley, a move encouraged by Leo after he and later C. J. Cregg notice that Clifford's personality and his skills are not unlike Josh. The Santos campaign initially loses the Iowa caucus, comes third in the New Hampshire primary and then goes on to win an upset victory in the California primary. Santos wins the Texas primary and the final New Jersey primary by a slim margin.

Going into the Democratic National Convention, no candidate has enough delegates to win the nomination, with delegates split among Russell, Santos, and Hoynes. At the convention, Pennsylvania Governor Eric Baker attempts an upstart campaign from the convention floor that further fractures the delegates. Ultimately Santos wins the nomination after an inspiring convention speech that was expected to be a concession, and behind-the-scenes maneuvering by President Bartlet. Josh is influential in recruiting Leo McGarry as the vice presidential nominee.

After Matt Santos is elected President of the United States in a narrow victory over Republican Senator Arnold Vinick, Josh becomes the White House Chief of Staff in the incoming Santos Administration. In his last appearance in the series, he is meeting privately with President Santos in the Oval Office.

== Relationships with other characters and with the series ==
=== Leo McGarry ===
John Spencer, who played Leo McGarry, described his character's relationship with Josh as a mentoring one, with Leo regarding Josh as a younger version of himself. Leo was an old friend of Josh's father, Noah Lyman. It is this connection that Leo uses to get Josh to travel and see then Governor Bartlet speak and later to join Bartlet's presidential campaign in the first place.

Assistant Secretary of State Albie Duncan refers to Josh as "McGarry's boy," and Bartlet believes that Josh would throw out the baby, the bath water, and the bathtub in order to avoid letting Leo down. Both show strong loyalty to one another, with Josh going to great lengths to prevent damaging details of Leo's past drug addiction and alcoholism from being made public and Leo supporting Josh as he struggles with post-traumatic stress disorder, promising that "as long as I got a job, you got a job." After Leo's death, President Bartlet says that Leo loved Josh like a son. On one occasion, Bartlet jokingly remarks to Leo that Josh, "frankly, is a lot smarter than you."

=== Donna Moss ===
Josh's assistant Donna Moss, portrayed by Janel Moloney, was originally slated to be a minor recurring character; however, the chemistry between the two actors caught producers' attention early on. After seeing Moloney and Whitford perform together in the pilot, Aaron Sorkin added a scene in which Donna argues with Josh to change his shirt before attending a meeting, eventually convincing him by saying that "All the girls think you look really hot in this shirt." Although Mandy Hampton was originally intended to be Josh's romantic interest, by the end of the show's first season the character had been written out and the role taken over by Donna.

During the first four seasons, the relationship remains in stasis, with neither daring to make any real romantic move. Sorkin admits that he was more inclined to move the relationship forward, but every time he discussed the possibility fellow executive producer Thomas Schlamme would shout, "No! Wait another year!" "Besides", adds Sorkin, "Sexual and romantic tension is, to me, much more fun than taking the tension away by having the sex and romance."

Other characters occasionally speculate on the pair's relationship. When Donna encourages Josh to ask Joey Lucas on a date, Joey guesses that Donna is attempting to cover her own feelings for Josh through misdirection. During the same episode, Josh and Sam Seaborn discuss why Donna was so pushy about asking out Joey; Josh comments that he wonders why Donna would not be jealous. To this, Sam asks if Josh gets jealous when Donna dates. Josh says he does not but does everything in his power to stop or hinder the dates from happening. During her first meeting with Josh, Amy Gardner asks him if he is dating his assistant, and later asks Donna directly, "Are you in love with Josh?", we do not see Donna's answer. When Donna recruits Josh to help her get a date with Jack Reese, Josh's behavior leads Jack to wonder whether he is getting "in between anything".

Following Sorkin and Schlamme's departure from the series at the end of the fourth season, the relationship takes some new turns, with Donna attempting to broaden her horizons past Josh and pursue her own social life outside of the White House. In season 5, when Donna is badly injured in a terrorist attack in Gaza, Josh rushes to keep vigil at her bedside at a military hospital in Germany. In the sixth-season episode "Impact Winter," Donna quits her job as assistant to Josh, seeing no chance of career advancement. She begins working for Vice President Bob Russell's presidential campaign. About the same time, Josh leaves his job to work on Matt Santos' campaign. This puts Donna and Josh in direct confrontation as their candidates battle each other for the Democratic nomination. Santos beats Russell for the nomination in the season 6 finale "2162 Votes." Donna applies for a job in the Santos for President campaign in the Season 7 premiere "The Ticket," but Josh finds himself forced to reject her as she is on record trashing his candidate while she was working for the other team. During their conversation he reveals that he misses her "every day." Later, Lou Thornton hires Donna to work on the Santos campaign with Lou corralling the two into a meeting room for a quick reconciliation.

In the Season 7 episode "The Cold," Josh and Donna kiss passionately as she brings him the good news that Congressman Santos has caught up to Vinick and that they are tied in the national tracking polls. Josh later apologizes, saying the kiss was "inappropriate," but Donna says, "It was bound to happen sometime." Donna talks to Will, who says pursuing a relationship with Josh would not be inappropriate. Later in the episode, Donna discreetly leaves the key to her hotel room on the table for Josh, but Edith Ortega notices the key before Josh can retrieve it and returns the key to Donna. In "Election Day," Josh and Donna consummate their relationship, sleeping together twice, both times at her initiative. Donna gives Josh four weeks to figure out "what they want from each other." She insists that if this cannot happen within four weeks, their relationship will remain in a constant state of ambiguity, which is not what Donna wants. After talking to Lou as well as his deputy-of-choice Sam Seaborn, Josh realizes that he desperately needs to take a break from work. At the end of the episode, Josh and Donna go on vacation together.

In the series finale "Tomorrow," Josh and Donna wake up in bed together on the morning of Inauguration Day, ten weeks after Donna set the four-week deadline.

=== Sam Seaborn ===
Sam is Josh's close friend, remarking that he "love[s] Josh like a brother." After Leo recruits Josh to the campaign, Josh's first stop is to recruit Sam (who is working, unhappily, at a law firm) to join him. As two of the youngest members of the senior staff, they occasionally get in trouble for their various schemes and incidents, usually with the best intentions. Much like the relationship between Jed Bartlet and Leo McGarry, Josh and Sam's friendship extends far past their role as co-workers and the two are each other's confidants on personal matters and relationship troubles. They even spend some holidays together when not going home.

After Sam leaves the White House at the end of Bartlet's first term to run for Congress, the role of Josh's counterpart is taken over by Toby Ziegler, although that relationship becomes frayed when Josh leaves the White House to run the presidential campaign of Matthew Santos. After Santos is elected, Josh quickly resolves to include Sam (who lost his congressional bid) by flying out to Los Angeles on a same day round trip and offering him the position of Deputy Chief of Staff. Sam is initially reluctant because he is engaged and aware of the job commitment involved but ultimately accepts, though after giving a frazzled Josh an ultimatum: get much-needed rest for a week or watch Sam return to California and never come back. Josh and Sam's last scene shows them together in the Oval Office for the new President's first briefing.

=== President Bartlet ===
Throughout the series, Bartlet (along with Leo) appears as a fatherly figure to Josh. Although flashbacks reveal that President Bartlet initially had trouble remembering Josh's name and telling him apart from his other advisors, the President develops a special affection for Josh and even refers to Josh as his son in the season two finale "Two Cathedrals". When Josh's father dies, Josh books a plane trip back to Connecticut when Bartlet makes a surprise appearance at the airport terminal. Bartlet offers his condolences and asks Josh if he wants him to go to Connecticut with him, to which a visibly moved Josh says no. Josh tells Bartlet that his father was proud to have him working on the campaign, and that his father wanted Bartlet to win the election. Bartlet regards his young Deputy Chief of Staff as an integral part of the machine that makes the White House run properly; the brain behind the political strategic planning of the administration. When a powerful but difficult Hollywood studio chief threatens to cancel a critical fundraiser over an issue, he bosses Josh around in the process and later prompts an infuriated Bartlet to demand that Josh be treated with respect. When Josh tells the President he wants to leave the Bartlet administration to run the Santos campaign, he says he had never imagined having the conversation, and tells Leo that he does not "know how to tell him." During the primary and general election, Josh works to keep Santos from making any comments that would put Bartlet in any form of negative light. An example of this is very early in the campaign, Bartlet gives Josh some New Hampshire dropout numbers for Santos to use when talking about education, urging Josh to have Santos say Bartlet had not done enough. Immediately after the conversation, Josh burns the numbers. After Leo's funeral, a grieving Josh confides to Bartlet that "Leo and I were supposed to be doing this together" upon working under the new Santos presidency. Bartlet responds with "Leo and I are the past. You are the future." Bartlet informs Josh that he can always call him if he needs advice.

=== President Santos ===
When Josh first meets then-Congressman Matt Santos he is impressed by his conviction and sees in him the same willingness to put his beliefs before political profit as he did in President Bartlet. Santos is ready to leave Washington and national politics to go back to Houston and spend more time with his family. When Josh gets caught up between offers from both major Democratic candidates for the presidential nomination in 2006, Vice President Bob Russell and former Vice President John Hoynes, he decides that he does not want to work for either of them. After a discussion with his mentor Leo McGarry, Josh discovers that he has already found his guy, Congressman Santos. He flies to Houston to pitch Santos his plan to make him President of the United States and after a few days Santos accepts by telling Josh "I'm in, if you're in with me". The two start a close relationship which appears to be complicated when they got into a number of fights—for example, in the Season 6 episode "La Parabla", Josh urges Santos not to put his personal financial future at risk just to continue the campaign—but they clearly care for each other.

In "The Wedding", during the general election campaign, Santos seems to be ready to fire Josh as campaign manager. At Leo's persuasion, Santos keeps him on and ends up winning the election. In "Election Day Part II", just after the final state (Nevada) is called, Santos looks at Josh across the room and thanks him, acknowledging Josh as the major architect behind his victory. Despite their close relationship, Santos has his own mind and disagrees with Josh at times due to Josh's willingness to resort to dirty politicking. When Santos passes over Josh to run his presidential transition team, he argues that it keeps Josh from "saying no" to the people Josh would later have to deal with in his capacity as Santos' Chief of Staff. Santos considers Josh his top advisor (akin to Leo McGarry to Jed Bartlet) and tends to listen to Josh more often than not. For example, Santos takes his advice when Josh recommends McGarry as Santos's running mate and when he tells Santos not to meddle in the speakership race. Another example of the connection the two have is shown when Santos begins to have concern for Josh's well-being when Josh seems to overwork himself during the transition. Santos questions Donna Moss about Josh's personal life and asks her whether Josh is seeing anyone or ever has any fun. When Josh decides to take a vacation, Santos remarks that he "would've driven you to the airport myself if it didn't require a motorcade."

In the final episode of the series Josh assumes his new position as White House Chief of Staff.

== Reception ==
The Washington Post focuses on Josh's romantic tension with Donna Moss, Josh's assistant. They go on to say that while Josh and Donna's relationship was perceived as flirtatious and romantic in the time it was released, viewing the show after the Me Too movement shed a negative light on their story. The Post calls it "The Donna Problem" - that society and culture have moved on from what was acceptable back then, and now shows that are still well-written and produced are relics of that older time. They remark that Josh's behavior as the boss romantically interested in his subordinate is "an example of what we’re currently trying to educate men not to do in the workplace."

The Atlantic Wire ranked Josh as 17th on their list of characters in The West Wing, remarking that Lyman is "inarguably the show's most consistently dominant character" and "Arrogant, blustery and often tragically funny." The ranking was an average of the three writers who created that list, and while two of the writers ranked Josh Lyman as just below the main characters, a third writer ranked Josh as middle of the pack, bringing down the average. The relative public anger at the release of the list on social media, particularly of Lyman's low ranking, prompted two of the writers to interview themselves on a separate piece. The writer who gave the bad ranking, Kevin O'Keefe, explained that he saw Josh as "loud and immature... his attitude towards women – including and especially his treatment of his assistant Donna – is pretty terrible." O'Keefe also drew a parallel to Will McAvoy on another television show by Aaron Sorkin, The Newsroom, talking about a similarity in their pattern of sexual harassment. O'Keefe also mocked the internet response to his decision, saying that "the defense seems to be 'but it's Josh! Josh is great!'... all the tweets and comments we got just baffled me." The writer who rated Lyman the highest, David Sims, argued that Josh is well-written regardless of his attitude, and is a central figure to the show. He also says that Josh has a complete character arc rivaled only by C. J. Cregg, and agreed that the internet response was silly by nature of those who were willing to defend Josh without clear reasoning.

Vulture ranked Josh as 7th on their list of all characters created by Aaron Sorkin, remarking that he takes his professional position quite personally. They also lauded Josh's drive, quipping that "not even a bullet could dampen his enthusiasm for governing."

== See also ==
- The West Wing
- List of characters on The West Wing
- List of episodes of The West Wing
