= The West Wing season 7 =

The West Wing
- Season 7
- DVD box cover. Cast from top to bottom and left to right: President Bartlet, Leo, Charlie, Annabeth, Abbey, Josh, Matt, Donna, Will, Kate, Sen. Vinick, Toby and C. J.
- Showrunner: John Wells
- Starring: Alan Alda; Stockard Channing; Kristin Chenoweth; Dulé Hill; Allison Janney; Joshua Malina; Mary McCormack; Janel Moloney; Richard Schiff; John Spencer; Bradley Whitford; Jimmy Smits; Martin Sheen
- No. of episodes: 22

Release
- Original network: NBC
- Original release: September 25, 2005 – May 14, 2006

Season chronology
- ← Previous; Season 6

The seventh and final season of the American political drama television series The West Wing aired in the United States on NBC from September 25, 2005, to May 14, 2006, and consisted of 22 episodes. The series changed time slots from Wednesdays at 9:00 pm to Sundays at 8:00 pm, and the series struggled in its new time slot against ABC's Extreme Makeover: Home Edition and CBS's Cold Case.

== Plot ==
The seventh and final season principally follows Santos and Vinick on the campaign trail, while also addressing the aftermath of the space shuttle leak investigation. The Bartlet administration's last year in office is featured, but not prominently. Toby admits to leaking the story about a military spacecraft and President Bartlet is forced to fire him. Later, Toby refuses to name his recently deceased brother as the source of the classified information, despite being urged to by his ex-wife, his lawyer and a federal prosecutor, as he feels it would be wrong to dishonor his brother's memory. C.J.'s tenure as Chief of Staff becomes more stressful as she deals with the war between Russia and China over Kazakhstan. The presidential race tightens up when Vinick's lead is dampened by an accident at a nuclear plant he had championed. Leo suffers a heart attack and dies on the night of the election, reflecting the death of actor John Spencer. Santos wins the election, and the last few episodes show the final days of the Bartlet administration and Santos' transition. In the series finale, Santos is sworn in as president.

== Cast ==
The seventh season had star billing for thirteen major roles, with the previously recurring Kristin Chenoweth joining twelve returning main cast members from the sixth season. Jimmy Smits is the only actor to appear in all 22 episodes. Sheen (12 episodes), Alda (12 episodes), Janney (17 episodes), Whitford (19 episodes), McCormack (12 episodes), Chenoweth (10 episodes), and Spencer (7 episodes) are credited for all 22 episodes, despite appearing in a diminished capacity. Spencer died of a heart attack in December 2005. Hill (5 episodes), Channing (4 episodes), Schiff (11 episodes), Malina (13 episodes), and Moloney (13 episodes) are only credited for the episodes in which they appear.

=== Main cast ===
- Alan Alda as Arnold Vinick
- Stockard Channing as Abbey Bartlet
- Kristin Chenoweth as Annabeth Schott
- Dulé Hill as Charlie Young
- Allison Janney as C. J. Cregg
- Joshua Malina as Will Bailey
- Mary McCormack as Kate Harper
- Janel Moloney as Donna Moss
- Richard Schiff as Toby Ziegler
- John Spencer as Leo McGarry
- Bradley Whitford as Josh Lyman
- Jimmy Smits as Matt Santos
- Martin Sheen as Josiah Bartlet

=== Recurring cast ===
Janeane Garofalo initially joined the show for a three-episode arc as Louise Thornton, a media strategist hired by Matt Santos; however, she became a long-term recurring cast member. Other characters who returned in recurring roles were Ron Silver as Bruno Gianelli, campaign manager for Senator Vinick. Other guest stars returning to recurring roles include Teri Polo as Helen Santos, Patricia Richardson as Vinick's chief of staff Sheila Brooks, Lily Tomlin as presidential secretary Deborah Fiderer, Karis Campbell as Santos' secretary Ronna, Allison Smith as Leo's daughter, Mallory, Kathleen York as Andrea Wyatt, Melissa Fitzgerald as Carol, Renée Estevez as Nancy, and Peter James Smith and William Duffy as Ed and Larry and all White House staff. Oliver Platt returned in his recurring role as Oliver Babish, having previously appeared back in 2001. In March 2006, it was announced that a number of former cast members would be reprising their roles. These included Rob Lowe as Sam Seaborn, Mary-Louise Parker as women's-rights advocate Amy Gardner, Anna Deavere Smith as National Security Advisor Nancy McNally, Emily Procter as Republican attorney Ainsley Hayes, Marlee Matlin as pollster Joey Lucas, Gary Cole as Vice President Bob Russell, Tim Matheson as former Vice President John Hoynes, Timothy Busfield as journalist Danny Concannon, and Annabeth Gish as Liz Bartlet Westin, eldest daughter of President Bartlet.

== Episodes ==
No. overall	No. in season	Title	Directed by	Written by	Original release date	Prod. code	US viewers (millions)
133	1	"The Ticket"	Christopher Misiano	Debora Cahn	September 25, 2005	2T6201	8.90
The season opener starts with a scene from three years in the future: a reunion of main characters at the opening of Bartlet's presidential library and Josh introducing the President, whose identity is not revealed. C.J. and Danny are together and have had a baby, Will Bailey is a Congressman, and Kate Harper has written a book; Toby Ziegler is also present and received warmly by President Bartlet. Leo McGarry is not present (coincidentally, actor John Spencer died three months after the airing of this episode). The show then returns to the main timeline with the Santos/McGarry campaign getting off to a rough start with tensions between Santos and Leo and between the campaign and the White House, despite poll numbers which show the campaign doing better than expected. C.J. is questioned by the White House counsel as to her involvement with the leak about a secret military space shuttle.
134	2	"The Mommy Problem"	Alex Graves	Eli Attie	October 2, 2005	2T6202	7.66
The Santos campaign takes a media hit on security issues because of the Bartlet administration's handling of the leak investigation. A White House reporter, Greg Brock, is sent to jail for failing to disclose his sources, and Josh clashes with both the White House and with a new communications director (Janeane Garofalo). The campaign debates whether Santos should respond to a summons to a weekend of military reserve training.
135	3	"Message of the Week"	Christopher Misiano	Lawrence O'Donnell, Jr.	October 9, 2005	2T6203	7.95
The episode follows the ups and downs of the Vinick campaign as Santos gains momentum on national security, then loses momentum as Vinick presses him on immigration issues, although this prompts the resignation of a top Vinick aide. The religious right tries to corner Vinick into promising to appoint pro-life judges. Vinick's deception to appease them backfires before Governor Sullivan saves the day.
136	4	"Mr. Frost"	Andrew Bernstein	Alex Graves	October 16, 2005	2T6204	8.07
The Santos campaign's "education week" is derailed by a controversy over teaching intelligent design; however, the Santos campaign turns the issue around, playing off Vinick's vulnerability as a pro-choice Republican on religious issues. In the White House, subpoenas are being handed down. Palestinian Chairman Farad is murdered by a Palestinian suicide bomber. As Bartlet is determined to attend the funeral despite security concerns, C.J. is hounded by a lone intelligence agent who believes Farad's death was part of a larger conspiracy. She then finds out Kazakhstan's leader has also been assassinated – as the agent predicted. Toby reveals to C.J. that he was responsible for the security leak.
137	5	"Here Today"	Alex Graves	Peter Noah	October 23, 2005	2T6205	7.85
C.J. deals with the immediate repercussions of Toby's confession, including co-opting Will Bailey into his job, and White House Counsel Oliver Babish questions Toby until his lawyer intervenes. Josh struggles with the necessity to "clean house" on the Santos campaign, firing dozens of inexperienced staffers, including one man who has been close to Santos during his entire career. Kate Harper tangles with both the National Security Council and intelligence agent Frost as tensions rise between Russia and China. Ellie Bartlet reveals that she is engaged and tells her parents she should get married very soon because otherwise she will be a visibly pregnant bride. The president fires Toby and addresses the nation as Toby is led from the White House. Note: Submitted as Emmy nominee for Outstanding Drama.
138	6	"The Al Smith Dinner"	Lesli Linka Glatter	Eli Attie	October 30, 2005	2T6206	8.51
An ad by a 527 group attacking Santos for his pro-choice stand has both campaigns up in arms, trying to avoid the campaign going negative or diving into the abortion issue — a touchy subject for both candidates: Vinick because his pro-choice position risks alienating pro-life conservatives, Santos because his risks alienating pro-choice liberals, including a major pro-choice interest group who are considering endorsing Vinick. Back at the White House, Will struggles with dealing with the press as the new Communications Director, settling into Toby's old office. Josh struggles with Lou Thornton's decision to bring Donna into the campaign as a spokesperson. In the final moments, as both candidates wait backstage at the Alfred E. Smith Memorial Foundation Dinner, Santos and Vinick agree to an unexpected deal: a live debate the following Sunday.
139	7	"The Debate"	Alex Graves	Lawrence O'Donnell, Jr.	November 6, 2005	2T6207	9.58
Candidates Matthew Santos and Arnold Vinick debate live in a forum moderated by Forrest Sawyer. During Vinick's opening statement, he proposes dropping the negotiated rules and having a freer debate format. During the hour-long debate (originally broadcast live in two tapings for East and West Coast audiences), the two candidates cover topics ranging from immigration to job creation to health care to African debt relief.
140	8	"Undecideds"	Christopher Misiano	Debora Cahn	December 4, 2005	2T6208	7.26
Santos must face the challenge of visiting a Black family in Los Angeles whose child was shot by a Latino police officer. Josh finally visits Toby and goes from being angry at Toby's accurate bluntness to somber as he realizes Toby's view that Santos is not cut out to be President has some merit. C.J. must manage a crisis between China and Kazakhstan. Will must go through Ellie's wedding guest list in a painful, protracted negotiation. Note: Submitted as Emmy nominee for Outstanding Drama.
141	9	"The Wedding"	Max Mayer	Josh Singer	December 11, 2005	2T6209	8.13
Wedding plans for the Bartlets' daughter move forward as Josh tries to pay for a windfall in the polls with a dwindling campaign war chest. Meanwhile, the President must balance his daughter's most important day with a potential war between two nuclear powers. Democratic Party leaders want Leo to be campaign manager rather than Josh, but Josh has the trust of Leo and that carries through to Santos.
142	10	"Running Mates"	Paul McCrane	Peter Noah	January 8, 2006	2T6210	7.40
At the beginning of the episode, Martin Sheen directly addresses the viewers out of character to pay tribute to co-star John Spencer, who played Leo and had died three weeks prior to this episode's broadcast. In the episode, Leo does poorly in vice presidential debate practice, making Lou and Josh nervous, and the media catches wind. Will and Kate set up a date, which turns out to be watching the VP debate in Will's office. Santos takes time off from the campaign trail to visit his family, finding himself out-of-sync with domestic issues amid a flurry of invasive media coverage. Josh calls Toby, who is currently between arraignments, about the VP debate. In the end, Leo performs unexpectedly well, and reveals he leaked stories of his poor practice sessions to lower expectations.
143	11	"Internal Displacement"	Andrew Bernstein	Bradley Whitford	January 15, 2006	2T6211	6.36
C.J. realizes that she barely has any time left in office and decides to try to solve the crisis in Darfur, Sudan, along with the crisis between Russia and China over Kazakhstan. Adding more to her stress level, the President's son-in-law, Doug Westin, is rumored to be having an affair with his kids' nanny; a federal award of a major science project affects a U.S. Senate race in Kentucky; Danny Concannon (Timothy Busfield) makes his first appearance (outside of the season opener flash forward) since the fifth season to go on a date with C.J.; and Kate informs C.J. that a nuclear power plant in California is in serious trouble. Note: The episode title refers to the forced movement of people within their own country's borders.
144	12	"Duck and Cover"	Christopher Misiano	Eli Attie	January 22, 2006	2T6212	7.71
Elections are underway in Kazakhstan, but Russia and China teetering on the brink of an oil war in Central Asia is the least of Bartlet and C.J.'s concerns as they face a nuclear reactor in California on the verge of a meltdown. While agonizing over whether to evacuate nearby citizens and release radioactive steam into the atmosphere, the Santos and Vinick campaigns stare each other down, trying to avoid being the first to turn the crisis into a political issue – all the more complex as, decades ago, Vinick lobbied for the plant's construction, while Santos has spoken about the dangers of nuclear power. When the news comes out, the election becomes, in Josh's words, "too close to call." Note: The episode title refers to a method of personal protection against the effects of a nuclear explosion.
145	13	"The Cold"	Alex Graves	Story by : Debora Cahn & Lauren Schmidt; Teleplay by : Debora Cahn	March 12, 2006	2T6213	7.02
When new polling puts Santos and Vinick neck-and-neck nationwide, the Santos campaign staff are elated – Josh and Donna so much so that they end up sharing a kiss, which forces them to confront their feelings for each other. Vinick, on the other hand, has a cold, and is feeling pressure from the Republican National Committee to make a rightward turn in his campaign and play to the Republican base. This makes Bruno fear that he is going to be fired. President Bartlet summons both candidates to the White House so he can advise them that he is ordering tens of thousands of U.S. troops into Kazakhstan. Before he meets with either presidential candidate, he meets with Leo McGarry, whom he has also called to the White House. Bartlet's meeting with Leo is more personal as he shares his concerns about the consequences of his decisions, with Leo back in his old role as the President's closest confidant. This was John Spencer's last appearance. Note: Multiple unauthorized full video scenes involving Josh and Donna's kiss and the aftermath in this episode were leaked on Youtube, other video sharing sites and fan discussion sites weeks before airing originating from a press DVD. Submitted as Emmy nominee for Outstanding Drama.
146	14	"Two Weeks Out"	Laura Innes	Lawrence O'Donnell, Jr.	March 19, 2006	2T6214	8.07
With the election two weeks out and both candidates polling even in California, both the Santos and Vinick campaigns scramble to the state to try to gain free media from public events. Toby advises Josh that California is the big issue and that Santos should head there immediately. Santos' press coverage in California is trumped by Vinick holding a til-they-drop press conference outside the nuclear plant. Vinick, whose hand is broken by constant handshakes, has a stroke of luck when Bruno discovers Santos' briefcase in a holding room. Vinick and Bruno must make a difficult decision: do they use its contents against Santos, or take the high road and return it? The briefcase contains evidence that suggests that the Congressman may be supporting an illegitimate child. Vinick asks to meet with Santos, whereupon the Congressman angrily denies the accusation. When Vinick, still refusing to believe Santos, continues to push Santos, Santos shocks him with the revelation about the child's true parentage. The girl is actually his niece, and the daughter of his irresponsible brother who took off shortly after the mother became pregnant. Santos, after finding out about his niece, has been financially supporting her and her mother because he knows his brother never will. After chastising Vinick for jumping to conclusions and expressing his dismay that Vinick would stoop so low, he angrily leaves, while Vinick--mulling over what he has just been told--is left in the room. Note: Alan Alda won an Emmy Award for Outstanding Supporting Actor in a Drama Series for this episode.
147	15	"Welcome to Wherever You Are"	Matia Karrell	Josh Singer	March 26, 2006	2T6215	7.93
It is five days before the election – Halloween – and the Santos campaign's stress levels rise as they kick off a whirlwind tour of battleground states, with Jon Bon Jovi along for the ride. Santos is annoyed that his security briefings are cut short, and Josh is receiving campaign tips from Toby – who is himself facing a federal prosecutor who threatens new indictments which could derail the Santos campaign. Toby gets a brief respite from visits to the prosecutor's office to see his twin children (Molly and Huck) and his ex-wife, Andie, who urges Toby to blame his late brother for the sake of their children.
148	16	"Election Day Part I"	Mimi Leder	Lauren Schmidt	April 2, 2006	2T6216	7.27
The episode opens late at night on the day before election day. Various campaign staff hook up, and Josh and Donna sleep together twice. Election day brings stress in both campaigns: Josh is convinced he is finding problems in exit poll data, while the Vinick campaign worries that the data shows them losing in key places. West Virginia is unexpectedly called for Vinick and the traditionally Republican South Carolina is called for Santos. The episode closes with Annabeth finding Leo unconscious in his room, her screaming for help, and Secret Service agents closing in calling over their radio, "He's down, he's down!" Note: Both parts of the episode credited Foo Fighters rock band as Special Musical Appearance. Emmy nominated for Outstanding Directing for a Drama Series.
149	17	"Election Day Part II"	Christopher Misiano	Eli Attie & John Wells	April 9, 2006	2T6217	8.39
Leo McGarry has died of a massive heart attack. During an exhausting and adrenaline-filled night, the electoral votes come in as the Santos and Vinick campaigns wait anxiously. C.J. breaks the news of Leo's death to President Bartlet, and the news hits the airwaves less than an hour before polls close on the West Coast. After Santos and Vinick win their home states of Texas and California respectively, the two campaigns agonize over whether to mount legal challenges before final results are announced in Nevada and Oregon. In the end, both states break for Santos, who gives his election night speech as the President-elect. Note: The electoral college, as displayed in this episode, was accurate to the time of airing. If the subsequent, real-life presidential election had the same voting outcome, the results would match. Submitted as Emmy nominee for Outstanding Drama.
150	18	"Requiem"	Steve Shill	Eli Attie, Debora Cahn & John Wells	April 16, 2006	2T6218	8.29
Leo's funeral brings back fond memories and old friends, including Amy Gardner, who urges Josh to consider appointing a Congresswoman from Florida Vice President; Ainsley Hayes, who approaches C.J. about a job in the Santos administration; Danny Concannon, who tries to rekindle his relationship with C.J.; and Bob Russell, who fruitlessly offers himself as a vice presidential prospect. Meanwhile, Santos and Josh clash over Barry Goodwin's place in the transition, Santos is not happy when he is pushed to become a kingmaker in the race for House Speaker, and Bartlet and the staff reminisce about Leo in the Residence. Note: Submitted as Emmy nominee for Outstanding Drama.
151	19	"Transition"	Nelson McCormick	Peter Noah	April 23, 2006	2T6219	8.42
Josh's hectic schedule begins to catch up to him, and friends and co-workers worry that if he does not take some time off soon, he will not be able to function as chief of staff in the long run. Meanwhile, Josh has his hands full, acting as liaison between the President-Elect and the White House, and trying to staff the West Wing for the new administration. Top of his list is former Deputy Communications Director Sam Seaborn (Rob Lowe), who is reluctant to leave his happy life working in the private sector. Sam steps in when Josh is about to make a talented young staffer into his scapegoat and outlines a deal: he will become Josh's Deputy Chief of staff only if Josh goes on a week's vacation and comes back at his best. In the end, Josh flies off with Donna who had previously given him an ultimatum to define their relationship. Meanwhile, Santos enrages C.J. by undermining Bartlet's military agenda with a phone call to the President of China.
152	20	"The Last Hurrah"	Tim Matheson	Lawrence O'Donnell, Jr.	April 30, 2006	2T6220	8.34
The transition is speeding ahead, and Matt and Helen Santos are overwhelmed by almost everything about their new lives – including Secret Service protection, choosing a DC school for their kids, and dealing with the White House household staff. Vinick slips back into anonymity with too much time on his hands, and his staffers come to realize he is plotting another run for the presidency. Santos is trying to figure out how to get his vice-presidential choice confirmed, and makes a surprising offer to Vinick: be the new administration's Secretary of State. Note: Alan Alda won an Emmy Award for Outstanding Supporting Actor in a Drama Series for this episode.
153	21	"Institutional Memory"	Lesli Linka Glatter	Debora Cahn	May 7, 2006	2T6221	7.94
The episode is set two weeks before the inauguration and the Bartlet administration staff is preparing to leave the White House. Most are seeking jobs in the Santos administration or the lucrative private sector. C.J. is offered two jobs she is interested in - one to manage a billionaire's philanthropic foundation and one as a high-ranking counselor in the Santos administration. C.J.'s relationship with Danny is suffering because he feels she is not taking it seriously. C.J. also visits Toby for the first time since his dismissal and considers whether she should urge President Bartlet to pardon him before leaving office. Will Bailey is offered a job with the DCCC to help get Democrats elected but finds himself becoming interested in one apparently unwinnable congressional seat in Oregon. Note: Allison Janney submitted this episode as a nominee for Outstanding Lead Actress in a Drama Series.
154	22	"Tomorrow"	Christopher Misiano	John Wells	May 14, 2006	2T6222	10.11
President Santos is inaugurated and President Bartlet leaves office. It is revealed that Santos plans to try to make Governor Eric Baker the vice-president through the Twenty-fifth Amendment and Bartlet pardons Toby in the last hours of his presidency. C.J. turns down a job offer in the Santos administration to head a nonprofit. Will decides to move to Oregon to run for congress. Donna becomes the new first lady's chief of staff. Note: Martin Sheen submitted this episode as an Emmy nominee for Outstanding Lead Actor in a Drama Series. Also submitted as Emmy nominee for Outstanding Drama.

== Reception ==
=== Critical response ===
On Rotten Tomatoes, the season has an approval rating of 95% with an average score of 8.5 out of 10 based on 20 reviews. The website's critical consensus reads, "Bidding a fond farewell to the Bartlet administration, The West Wing regains its idealistic thrill with a sweetly amicable presidential election in this strong final season."

PopMatters said the final season "recovered its sense of humor". David Hinckley of the Daily News praised the character of Bruno Gianelli as a "brilliant (...) shark of a campaign manager" and commended the series for never rushing the romantic character arc of Josh and Donna. As the fictional Election Day approached, Aleksandra Stankovic of The Harvard Crimson said that "a more complex, more mature West Wing, but one with no clear narrative resolution in sight" was evolving and that she welcomed the "restoration of narrative tension". Bill Brioux from the Toronto Sun agreed, stating that the seventh series was "enjoying a creative renaissance" and had been "enlivened by the election storyline". Mike Duffy of the Detroit Free Press said that The West Wing had "rediscovered the vivid political zing in its farewell season"; however, Jeffrey Robinson from DVD Talk commented that the shift away from daily issues and operations in the White House meant "season seven did not feel like The West Wing".

One episode, "The Debate", was aired as live television. Rob Owen of the Pittsburgh Post-Gazette wrote that "real-life issues were brought to a prime-time national audience," but the first half was "boring back-and-forth [with] not much revealed about the characters" and had it not been live it could have been "stronger, better produced and with a less dull first half." Janet Daley of The Daily Telegraph called the episode "riveting, and astonishingly brave" with "dazzling exposition of the central political argument of our time: whether free markets deliver better life chances, and a more virtuous society, than economies controlled by government."

=== Accolades ===
The season was nominated for six Primetime Emmy Awards in 2006, winning two. The show was nominated for Outstanding Drama Series for the seventh year running. Alan Alda, as Senator Vinick, won in the award for Outstanding Supporting Actor in a Drama Series. Martin Sheen, as President Bartlet, was nominated for Outstanding Lead Actor in a Drama Series and Allison Janney, as C.J., was nominated in the Outstanding Lead Actress in a Drama Series category. Mimi Leder was nominated for Outstanding Directing in a Drama Series for the episode "Election Day" and Audio mixer Edward J. Greene and EFX mixer Andrew Strauber won the award for Outstanding Multi-camera Sound Mixing for a Series or Special for "The Debate". Eli Attie and John Wells received a Writers Guild of America Award nomination in the Episodic Drama category for "Election Day Part II". Attie and Wells were nominated for the $15,000 Humanitas Prize in the 60-minute category for the same episode, which was also the submission that won the show an AFI Award that year. The show won the Hallmark Hall of Fame Heritage Award at the Television Critics Association Awards and Alda received a nomination for Individual Achievement in Drama. Alda was also nominated for a Screen Actors Guild Award for Outstanding Performance by a Male Actor in a Drama Series, The Guild nominated the whole ensemble for the Outstanding Performance in a Drama Series award. Supervising sound editors Walter Newman and Thomas A. Harris, supervising dialogue editor Catherine Flynn, and dialogue and ADR editors Virginia Cook and Steffan Falesitch were nominated for a Golden Reel Award in the Best Sound Editing in Television: Short Form – Dialogue and Automated Dialogue Replacement with the episode "The Ticket". At the ALMA Awards, a Latino awards ceremony, the show won Best TV Series and Jimmy Smits (as Matt Santos) as Best Actor in a TV Series. At another Latino ceremony, the Imagen Awards, the show won Best Primetime Series with Smits nominated for Best Actor in Television.

=== Ratings ===
Despite slipping ratings and a fear the show would be axed, NBC announced in March 2005 that The West Wing would be returning for a seventh season. The change from Wednesdays to Sundays cost the show approximately 30 percent of its audience; the first two episodes of the season garnered the series' lowest ever ratings and Deseret News said the move of time slot sealed the show's fate. In January 2006, it was announced that the seventh would be the final season. Kevin Reilly, entertainment president for NBC, said that after poor viewing figures for the "last couple of seasons [they reached] a point where you look at the ratings and you just say, 'it's time.'"

== Crew ==
The season was produced by John Wells Productions in association with Warner Bros. Television. The executive producers were the production company's namesake and founder John Wells, Christopher Misiano, Alex Graves, political analyst Lawrence O'Donnell and Peter Noah; Noah was previously a supervising producer in the sixth season, and O'Donnell, who is a former Democratic chief of staff on the Senate Committee on Finance, provided insight into political life. The West Wing was created by Aaron Sorkin. For the seventh season, regular staff writers were Wells, O'Donnell, Noah, Eli Attie, Debora Cahn, Josh Singer and Lauren Schmidt, while cast member Bradley Whitford wrote his second episode of the series. The regular directors were Misiano, Graves, Andrew Bernstein and Lesli Linka Glatter.

== DVD release ==
DVDs for season seven were released first in the UK on September 11, 2006, and then in the US on November 7, 2006. As well as every episode from the season, the DVD release features bonus material, including two featurettes on "The Debate". Two versions of "The Debate" were performed, one for the East Coast and another for the West Coast. The West Coast version of "The Debate" is the one used on the DVD.

The West Wing: The Complete Seventh Season
Set details		Special features	
22 episodes; 6-disc set; 1.78:1 aspect ratio; English (Dolby Surround 2.0); Subtitles: French, Spanish		Featurettes: Live from the Director's Chair; Countdown to West Wing Live	
Release dates
United States	Canada	United Kingdom	Australia
November 7, 2006		September 11, 2006	August 8, 2007

The season was released on DVD as a six-disc boxed set under the title The West Wing: The Complete Seventh Season by Warner Home Video being released first in Region 2 on September 11, 2006, and then in Region 1 on November 7, 2006. All episodes from the season are available to purchase and download to registered users of iTunes Stores in certain countries and in the US through Amazon Video on Demand. In Canada, the seventh season was due to be simulcast on CTV; however, CTV dropped the series. In the United Kingdom the season premiered on March 10, 2006, on More4.
