= The West Wing season 6 =

The West Wing
- Season 6
- DVD box cover. Cast from left to right: Sen. Vinick, President Bartlet, and Rep. Santos.
- Showrunner: John Wells
- Starring: Alan Alda; Stockard Channing; Dulé Hill; Allison Janney; Joshua Malina; Mary McCormack; Janel Moloney; Richard Schiff; John Spencer; Bradley Whitford; Jimmy Smits; Martin Sheen
- No. of episodes: 22

Release
- Original network: NBC
- Original release: October 20, 2004 – April 6, 2005

Season chronology
- ← Previous; Season 5 Next → Season 7

The sixth season of the American political drama television series The West Wing aired in the United States on NBC from October 20, 2004, to April 6, 2005, and consisted of 22 episodes.

== Plot ==
The sixth season opens with the Israeli and Palestinian delegations arriving at Camp David for peace talks. Despite problems at the summit, a deal is thrashed out by President Bartlet, but not before he fires Leo as chief of staff. Leo suffers a heart attack in the aftermath, leading to a re-shuffle of the White House staff. CJ Cregg becomes chief of staff but she finds it difficult to adapt, a fact not helped by the President's worsening multiple sclerosis and consequent interference from the First Lady in an effort to conserve his energy. Away from the White House, Josh convinces Texas Congressman Matt Santos to run for president, and after a shaky start, Santos finds himself in a three-way race for the Democratic nomination with Vice President Russell and former Vice President Hoynes. While the Republican primaries provide a clear winner in California senator Arnold Vinick, a moderate, the Democratic ticket is not finalized until the Democratic National Convention, at which Santos is chosen as the presidential nominee, with Leo as his running mate. Meanwhile, someone at the White House has leaked national security information to reporter Greg Brock.

== Cast ==
The sixth season had star billing for twelve major roles, with nine of these filled by returning main cast members from the fifth season. The main cast members are credited alphabetically except for Jimmy Smits and Martin Sheen, who receive the "with" and "and" credits, respectively. Smits, Alda and Channing are only credited for the episodes in which they appear.

=== Main cast ===
- Alan Alda as Arnold Vinick
- Stockard Channing as Abbey Bartlet
- Dulé Hill as Charlie Young
- Allison Janney as C. J. Cregg
- Joshua Malina as Will Bailey
- Mary McCormack as Kate Harper
- Janel Moloney as Donna Moss
- Richard Schiff as Toby Ziegler
- John Spencer as Leo McGarry
- Bradley Whitford as Josh Lyman
- Jimmy Smits as Matt Santos
- Martin Sheen as Josiah Bartlet

=== Recurring cast ===
Characters that returned in recurring roles were Gary Cole as Vice President Bob Russell, Tim Matheson as former Vice President John Hoynes and Mark Feuerstein as Senate Majority Counsel Clifford Calley. Roger Rees as British ambassador Lord John Marbury also returned for one episode. Kristin Chenoweth joined the recurring cast as Annabeth Schott, a former feature writer who becomes Deputy Press Secretary. Recurring guest-star Ed O'Neill played Governor Eric Baker with Mel Harris (as Senator Rafferty) and Christopher Lloyd (portraying Lawrence Lessig) also guest-starring in one episode each. Actors who left the cast include John Amos as Chairman of the Joint Chiefs of Staff Percy Fitzwallace who was killed in the penultimate episode of the previous season, Jesse Bradford as intern Ryan Pierce and Michael Hyatt as legislative affairs advisor Angela Blake.

== Episodes ==
No. overall	No. in season	Title	Directed by	Written by	Original release date	Prod. code	US viewers (millions)
111	1	"NSF Thurmont"	Alex Graves	John Wells	October 20, 2004	2T5001	12.27
The world watches the aftermath of the Gaza attack on U.S. officials. The President learns that 82% of the American people, almost all of Congress, the Vice President and Secretary of Defense, the Joint Chiefs, and all of his staff aside from C.J. Cregg and Kate Harper want him to launch retaliatory military strikes immediately. Meanwhile, he tries to arrange peace talks between the Israelis and Palestinians at Camp David. Finally, he strikes one of three suggested targets and readies for the peace talks. Meanwhile, in Germany, Josh anxiously waits for Donna's recovery, leading to his feelings about her being questioned by Colin. Note: The episode title refers to the official military name of Camp David.
112	2	"The Birnam Wood"	Alex Graves	John Wells	October 27, 2004	2T5002	11.86
Josh returns to the US as Israeli-Palestinian peace talks at Camp David result in a momentous peace accord. President Bartlet fires White House Chief of Staff Leo McGarry, who was strongly against the talks. Moments later, Leo suffers a massive heart attack. Note: The episode title refers to the warning given to Macbeth in the Shakespeare play of the same name, in which he is warned that "Macbeth shall never vanquish'd be until / Great Birnam wood to high Dunsinane hill / Shall come against him.") Submitted as Emmy Nominee for Outstanding Drama Series.
113	3	"Third-Day Story"	Christopher Misiano	Eli Attie	November 3, 2004	2T5003	13.82
The senior staff clash with Congressional leaders on how to fund US peacekeepers destined for the Middle East following the peace accord signed by Israel and the Palestinians. Donna returns to Washington as her injuries slowly heal. As Leo recovers from his heart attack, the Cabinet secretaries and senior staff members continually make missteps without a Chief of Staff. Bartlet eventually asks C.J. to become the new Chief of Staff. Note: Stockard Channing submitted this episode as an Emmy nominee for Outstanding Supporting Actress in a Drama Series.
114	4	"Liftoff"	Alex Graves	Debora Cahn	November 10, 2004	2T5004	15.26
C.J. Cregg begins her tenure as White House Chief of Staff, as Toby and Donna begin searching for a new Press Secretary. The Republic of Georgia offers to give the United States its stockpile of weapons-grade uranium. Josh meets with Representative Matthew Santos of Texas, who is retiring from Congress despite having only recently been re-elected to his seat. Santos will become a recurring character this season, as he begins a campaign for the Presidency. Note: Submitted as Emmy Nominee for Outstanding Drama Series.
115	5	"The Hubbert Peak"	Julie Hébert	Peter Noah	November 17, 2004	2T5005	12.41
Josh crashes an SUV into a hybrid vehicle, causing a public relations disaster. He meets with environmental supporters who berate the White House for doing too little to beef up laws in this area, including raising fuel emissions standards; Josh points out that they have had seven years of a hostile Congress. Annabeth Schott decides she can coach Toby to do the White House's press briefings. Kate confronts Donna about her experiences in Gaza. Note: The episode title refers to the Hubbert peak theory, one of the primary theories behind the concept of peak oil.
116	6	"The Dover Test"	Laura Innes	Carol Flint	November 24, 2004	2T5006	11.76
Santos gets friendly with Republicans over a Patients' Bill of Rights, and the first American soldier dies in the Gaza peacekeeping mission, upsetting Donna. Note: The episode title refers to an informal test of public support for military action based on coverage of returning casualties.
117	7	"A Change Is Gonna Come"	Vincent Misiano	Story by : John Sacret Young; Teleplay by : John Sacret Young & Josh Singer	December 1, 2004	2T5007	13.28
While preparing for the upcoming China summit, the Chinese are insulted by President Bartlet's acceptance of a Taiwanese independence movement flag at a prayer breakfast. Charlie must try and return the flag, which proves difficult. Meanwhile, C.J. has to agree to stipulations the Chinese are making in order to mend fences. Eventually at a performance by James Taylor that evening paying tribute to Sam Cooke, Jed confides to Abby that he did not see the flag. He could not tie his bow tie, has not been able to focus for over a day, and has lost the sight in his right eye. Meanwhile, former Vice President John Hoynes asks Josh to run his presidential campaign. Note: The episode title refers to the song "A Change Is Gonna Come" by Sam Cooke.
118	8	"In the Room"	Alex Graves	Lawrence O'Donnell, Jr.	December 8, 2004	2T5008	12.33
At Zoey Bartlet's birthday party, magicians Penn and Teller appear to burn an American flag in the White House, prompting a publicity nightmare. Aboard Air Force One, Bartlet is stricken by a paralyzing MS episode, while Josh is approached to run Vice President Russell's presidential campaign. The Bartlet Administration offers Republican California Senator Arnold Vinick the position of US Ambassador to the UN, but he turns it down and announces his candidacy for the Presidency instead. Governor Baker drops out of the Democratic nomination race, making Russell the clear front-runner.
119	9	"Impact Winter"	Lesli Linka Glatter	Debora Cahn	December 15, 2004	2T5009	12.53
In China, an impaired Bartlet is having trouble sitting through meetings following his MS attack. In Washington, a NASA functionary warns that an asteroid could strike Earth, while Josh wonders who should be the next guy to occupy the Oval Office and puts off a talk with Donna about her future until she finally quits her job. Note: The episode title refers to a hypothesized period of extreme cold weather in the event of an asteroid or comet striking the surface of the Earth.
120	10	"Faith Based Initiative"	Christopher Misiano	Bradley Whitford	January 5, 2005	2T5010	11.74
A senator attaches a rider to the federal budget bill that would ban gay marriage, almost daring the President to veto it. Josh struggles with his replacement assistant. The Internet is rampant with a story that questions C.J.'s sexual orientation, and it is only fueled further when the White House refuses to dignify the allegations by putting out a statement. Donna joins the Vice President's campaign staff and heads for New Hampshire, while Santos decides that he will run for president if Josh will run his campaign.
121	11	"Opposition Research"	Christopher Misiano	Eli Attie	January 12, 2005	2T5011	11.88
Santos starts up his presidential campaign in New Hampshire, where he and Josh immediately disagree on campaign philosophy, Santos is criticized by Doug Westin, and Josh has a reunion with Donna.
122	12	"365 Days"	Andrew Bernstein	Mark Goffman	January 19, 2005	2T5012	10.92
On the day after Bartlet has given his last State of the Union address, Leo returns to the West Wing. After the US ambassador to Bolivia makes a speech about the upcoming elections there, a Socialist candidate surges in the polls. His followers later kidnap several American contractors working on drug eradication efforts. The First Lady has to attend a NASCAR NEXTEL Cup race at Martinsville. The President is sick and needs to take regular naps but, eventually, at the prodding of Leo, he calls together the White House Staff. With 364 days left in his term, he encourages his staff to use the term to make bold initiatives. One by one, C.J., Toby, Charlie, Annabeth, Will, and Kate all suggest pressing concerns, changes they would like to see made in the time they have left.
123	13	"King Corn"	Alex Graves	John Wells	January 26, 2005	2T5013	10.69
The presidential candidates journey to Iowa, where Democrats Russell and Santos, and Republican Vinick, are all told by their handlers that when they appear before the corn growers association they must support subsidies for ethanol as fuel, regardless of their true feelings. Vinick becomes the only candidate able to keep true to his convictions. Note: The episode title refers to the phrase "corn is king," often used in Iowa to describe the state's dependence on the crop. Alan Alda submitted this episode as an Emmy nominee for Outstanding Supporting Actor in a Drama Series. Also submitted as Emmy nominee for Outstanding Drama.
124	14	"The Wake Up Call"	Laura Innes	Josh Singer	February 9, 2005	2T5014	9.62
When a British passenger aircraft is accidentally shot down over Iran, causing an international crisis, C.J. battles with the First Lady over how much to let Bartlet's MS affect his schedule; Toby and constitutional scholar Lawrence Lessig (Christopher Lloyd) work with Belarusian diplomats on a new constitution. Note: Stockard Channing submitted this episode as an Emmy nominee for Outstanding Supporting Actress in a Drama Series.
125	15	"Freedonia"	Christopher Misiano	Eli Attie	February 16, 2005	2T5015	10.17
It is five days before the New Hampshire primary, and Josh is desperately trying to find a "silver bullet" that will get his candidate into the local debate between front-runners Russell and Hoynes. Then, Josh and Santos's disagreements over how to run the campaign come to a head when Santos hires Josh's ex-girlfriend Amy Gardner to help him prepare for the debate. Note: The episode title refers to a fictional country popularized by the 1933 Marx Brothers film Duck Soup. Submitted as Emmy Nominee for Outstanding Drama Series.
126	16	"Drought Conditions"	Alex Graves	Debora Cahn	February 23, 2005	2T5016	9.93
The loss of Josh to the Santos campaign has left the West Wing staff noticeably shorthanded. Meanwhile, a bill to combat drought conditions in the western U.S. presents problems for C.J., particularly in dealing with lobbyist Clifford Calley – whom Leo suggests as a replacement for Josh. Reporter Greg Brock investigates the possibility of the White House secretly supporting one of the presidential candidates. Senator Rafferty, a new contender, garners media attention with a ground-breaking speech, her words echoing President Bartlet's original health care plan known only to White House insiders. Asked about this, Toby, who since the recent death of his brother has been even more morose than usual, confronts Josh with his feelings of betrayal over Josh leaving. Their heated argument escalates into a short brawl. In the aftermath, Toby confesses to C.J. that his brother did not die of cancer, but committed suicide. Charlie attempts to play matchmaker for Kate. Note: The episode title refers to the "Western Water Program" that Cliff Calley is pursuing in spite of droughts across the world.
127	17	"A Good Day"	Richard Schiff	Carol Flint	March 2, 2005	2T5017	10.66
Congressman Santos masterminds a plot to vote down Republican legislation in the House that would de-fund the President's program for stem cell research. A group of middle school children who are part of the Future Leaders for Democracy visits the White House and seeks out Toby to discuss the voting age. Kate has to deal with a ridiculous impending invasion of Canada.
128	18	"La Palabra"	Jason Ensler	Eli Attie	March 9, 2005	2T5018	10.10
As Super Tuesday approaches, the three Democratic candidates battle it out to win California as the state legislature passes a bill that would prevent illegal immigrants from obtaining driver's licenses. Note: The episode title translates to "the word" in Spanish.
129	19	"Ninety Miles Away"	Rod Holcomb	John Sacret Young	March 16, 2005	2T5019	9.75
When speculations fly surrounding the nexus between communist Cuba and the United States, President Bartlet is propelled into a dubious conundrum: continue secret talks with Cuba's ailing dictator and lift the longstanding embargo or to yield to bipartisan political pressure and reaffirm decades-old sanctions. Meanwhile, Leo and Kate learn that they have more in common than politics when a distant memory of corrupted elections and bar-room antics reveal a more intimate connection. Note: The episode title refers to the distance between Cuba and the United States quoted by Bartlet.
130	20	"In God We Trust"	Christopher Misiano	Lawrence O'Donnell, Jr.	March 23, 2005	2T5020	8.96
Senator Vinick wins the Republican nomination for presidency and begins working on his campaign. He gets political advice from campaign manager Bruno Gianelli (Ron Silver, reprising his recurring role from seasons 3–4) about choosing a vice president and how to deal with the latest controversy of Vinick's church attendance, or lack thereof. Meanwhile, the Democrats are stuck in a three-way race for enough delegates to win the Democratic nominations; Russell barely leads Santos and Hoynes is a distant third. Bartlet tries to show unity in the party by wrangling the candidates. Note: Alan Alda submitted this episode as an Emmy nominee for Outstanding Supporting Actor in a Drama Series. Also submitted as Emmy Nominee for Outstanding Drama Series.
131	21	"Things Fall Apart"	Nelson McCormick	Peter Noah	March 30, 2005	2T5021	9.88
The well-organized Republican convention is making the Democrats look in disarray as the three candidates continue to battle for the nomination. Bartlet asks Leo to take control and organize the convention. Meanwhile, the International Space Station has a leak and is losing oxygen which jeopardizes the lives of the three astronauts aboard and morality and mortality are examined. A super-secret space shuttle might help them but it is considered too sensitive to reveal, until someone has a different idea. Note: The episode title refers to a passage from the poem "The Second Coming" by William Butler Yeats.
132	22	"2162 Votes"	Alex Graves	John Wells	April 6, 2005	2T5022	11.62
Despite the best efforts of the White House, there is still no presidential nominee at the Democratic National Convention. As convention chair, Leo sits down with representatives from the various campaigns, trying to organize proceedings despite in-fighting. Meanwhile, the lives of the three astronauts in the International Space Station are still hanging in the balance as their oxygen supply dwindles. The White House tries to deal with the aftermath of the leaked rumor of a military shuttle that can be used to save them. With voices on all sides furious, President Bartlet demands that the leaker's name be on his desk by Friday and has given the task to Toby and Kate Harper. Back at the convention, Josh is trying to work out where he can find the crucial votes needed to win Santos the nomination. With the belief that Hoynes' campaign is over, Josh asks his former boss to transfer his votes to Santos after the first ballot. Meanwhile, the Russell camp receives some bad news as Governor Baker suddenly becomes a viable candidate. At the White House, Kate and Toby meet the FBI agents in charge of interviewing people capable of leaking the shuttle information. The guilty party is facing ten years in a federal prison for releasing classified information. After being asked to drop out and support a candidate Santos gives a rallying speech to the delegates reminding them to vote with their hearts. Inspired by this, Bartlet quietly intervenes and encourages holdout delegates to support Santos. Josh tells Leo they still need a vice president and that the choice for the candidate is Leo. Note: The episode title refers to the number of votes needed to clinch the Democratic presidential nomination in-universe. Nominated for Outstanding Directing for a Drama Series. Also submitted as Emmy Nominee for Outstanding Drama Series.

== Crew ==
The season was produced by John Wells Productions in association with Warner Bros. Television. The executive producers were the production company's namesake and founder John Wells, Christopher Misiano and Alex Graves – Llewellyn Wells (who left the show), Misiano and Graves had previously been co-executive producers in season five. Carol Flint, Peter Noah and John Sacret Young were supervising producers, and Eli Attie, Kristin Harms, Michael Hissrich and Andrew Stearn were producers. For the sixth season, regular staff writers were Wells, Flint, Noah, Young, Attie, Debora Cahn, Josh Singer, and former Democratic chief of staff on the Senate Committee on Finance, Lawrence O'Donnell. Cast member Bradley Whitford wrote his first episode of the series. The regular directors were Misiano and Graves, while cast member Richard Schiff directed his second episode of the series.

== Reception ==
=== Critical response ===
On Rotten Tomatoes, the season has an approval rating of 64% with an average score of 9.4 out of 10 based on 14 reviews.

=== Accolades ===
The season was nominated for five Primetime Emmy Awards in 2005 without any wins. The show was nominated for Outstanding Drama Series for the sixth year running. Alan Alda, as Senator Vinick, and Stockard Channing, as Abigail Bartlet were nominated for Outstanding Supporting Actor and Outstanding Supporting Actress in a Drama Series respectively. Alex Graves was nominated for Outstanding Directing in a Drama Series and production sound mixer Patrick Hanson and re-recording mixers Dan Hiland and Gary D. Rogers were nominated in the Outstanding Single-Camera Sound Mixing for a Series category, both for the episode "2162 Votes". "2162 Votes" also got Hanson, Hiland and Rogers a Cinema Audio Society Awards nomination for Outstanding Achievement in Sound Mixing for a Television Series. The show received a nomination in the Dramatic Series category and Carol Flint received a Writers Guild of America Award nomination in the Episodic Drama category for "A Good Day". Allison Janney, as C. J. Cregg, was nominated at the Screen Actors Guild Awards for Outstanding Performance by a Female Actor in a Drama Series and the whole ensemble for the Outstanding Performance in a Drama Series award. John Wells won the Humanitas Prize in the 60-minute category for "NSF Thurmont". At the Producers Guild of America Awards ceremony in 2005, the show was nominated for the Norman Felton Producer of the Year Award – Episodic Drama. Seth Adkins, as Cody Zucker, was nominated for a Young Artist Award in the Best Performance in a Television Series (Comedy or Drama) – Guest Starring Young Actor category. Composer W. G. "Snuffy" Walden was awarded a BMI Television Award for his work on the show. The season won two Imagen Awards, a Latino awards ceremony, with the submitted work "La Palabra". Executive producers John Wells, Christopher Misiano, Alex Graves, Director Jason Ensler, writer Eli Attie, and the executive producers won Best Primetime Series and Jimmy Smits (as Matt Santos) won Best Actor in Television.

== DVD release ==
The DVD release of season six was released by Warner Bros. first in the UK on September 26, 2005, and then in the US on May 9, 2006, after the season had completed broadcasting on television. As well as every episode from the season, the DVD release features bonus material including audio commentary on three episodes from directors and writers, and a documentary on Allison Janney's portrayal of C. J. Cregg.

The West Wing: The Complete Sixth Season
Set details		Special features	
22 episodes; 6-disc set; 1.78:1 aspect ratio; English (Dolby Surround 2.0); Subtitles: French, Spanish		Audio Commentary: "King Corn" by John Wells and Alex Graves; "In God We Trust" by Lawrence O'Donnell, Jr. and Christopher Misiano; "2162 Votes" by John Wells and Alex Graves; Featurettes: C. J. Cregg: From Press Secretary to Chief of Staff; Easter Egg – A Conversation with John Spencer	
Release dates
United States	Canada	United Kingdom	Australia
May 9, 2006		September 26, 2005	May 2, 2007

All episodes from the season are available to purchase and download through Warner Bros. Studio online store, to registered users of iTunes Stores in certain countries, and in the US through Amazon Video on Demand. In Canada, the sixth season was simulcast on CTV. In the United Kingdom the series was moved from E4 to Fridays at 9:00 p.m. on sister-station More4 with the season premiering in October 2005.
