= Celestial Navigation (The West Wing) =

- The West Wing episode
- Episode no.: Season 1 Episode 15
- Directed by: Christopher Misiano
- Story by: Dee Dee Myers; Lawrence O'Donnell Jr.
- Teleplay by: Aaron Sorkin
- Production code: 225914
- Original air date: February 16, 2000

Guest appearances
- CCH Pounder as Deborah O'Leary; Edward James Olmos as Judge Roberto Mendoza; Timothy Busfield as Danny Concannon

Episode chronology
← Previous "Take this Sabbath Day"	Next → "20 Hours in L.A."
- The West Wing season 1

"Celestial Navigation" is the fifteenth episode of the first season of the American serial political drama The West Wing. The episode aired on February 16, 2000 on NBC. The episode depicts Josh Lyman narrating a story from the past few days to a collegiate audience, as well as the President's nominee to the Supreme Court being arrested for drunk driving. The episode was widely regarded as lighter and more humorous than other episodes of The West Wing.

== Cast ==
- Martin Sheen as Josiah Bartlet, the President of the United States
- John Spencer as Leo McGarry, the White House Chief of Staff
- Bradley Whitford as Josh Lyman, the Deputy White House Chief of Staff
- Janel Moloney as Donna Moss, the assistant to Josh Lyman
- Dulé Hill as Charlie Young, the Personal Aide to the President
- Richard Schiff as Toby Ziegler, the White House Communications Director
- Allison Janney as C. J. Cregg, the White House Press Secretary
- Rob Lowe as Sam Seaborn, the Deputy White House Communications Director

== Plot ==
President Bartlet's Supreme Court nominee, Roberto Mendoza, has been arrested in Connecticut for drunk driving despite having done nothing wrong. Sam Seaborn and Toby Ziegler travel to where Mendoza is being held while Josh Lyman speaks at a lecture hall about his time working in the White House. Asked to describe a typical day at the White House, Josh narrates a story from two days before, which is interrupted throughout the episode by phone calls from Sam and Toby.

Two days prior, Deborah O'Leary, the secretary for Housing and Urban Development and an African American woman, accuses a prominent congressman of political racism while testifying before Congress. President Bartlet is asked by reporter Danny Concannon to comment on the incident; he initially sidesteps the question, then agrees that O'Leary should apologize. Leo McGarry then summons O'Leary and orders her to apologize despite her objections, threatening her job.

Sam, Toby, and C. J. Cregg are preparing for a press conference, but C. J. returns from a dentist appointment just before the conference with her speech impaired due to an emergency root canal. Instead of cancelling the briefing, Josh convinces C. J. to let him conduct it. Josh blunders several times during the conference, culminating in a sarcastic assertion that the President has "a secret plan to fight inflation"; he is mocked by the rest of the staff, including the president. Sam informs the staff that Mendoza has publicly rebuked the president for asking O'Leary to apologize; Mendoza is summoned to the White House.

In the present, Sam and Toby become briefly lost in Connecticut after Sam attempts to use the North Star to navigate, eventually reaching the police station where Mendoza is being held. The sergeant tells Sam that he suspected Mendoza had been drinking alcohol; Sam informs the officers that Mendoza has a chronic illness that makes alcohol consumption fatal. Inside his cell, Mendoza expresses his frustration to Toby, having been searched and handcuffed by police in front of his family just for being Hispanic. Mendoza intends to stay in prison and clear his name through the normal process, but Toby counters that Mendoza cannot get confirmed to the Supreme Court if this becomes public. Mendoza agrees to be released, and Toby tells the officers on duty that in exchange for Mendoza's release, and an apology to Mendoza and his family, the incident will remain off the record and no lawsuit will be filed against the county for racial profiling. They agree, and Mendoza is released.

== Reaction and trivia ==
Steve Heisler, writing for The A.V. Club, describes the episode as "the flat-out funniest West Wing I've seen", complimenting Allison Janney's performance as C. J. when she has cotton in her mouth. He also noted Donna's line to Josh after his press briefing, where she tells Josh to "go to your office, and come up with a secret plan to fight inflation". Heisler praises Edward James Olmos for his vigor and introspection in his scene with Toby, and said that he wanted to see more characters reveal what motivates them.

Liz Shannon Miller with IndieWire included the episode in a list of episodes "Binge View in Celebration of America". Miller noted Josh's scene where he created a "secret plan to fight inflation", and noted that while the episode wasn't "plot heavy... it is a delight".

The Guardian included the episode in its list of the top ten episodes of The West Wing. They contrasted the episode to "In Excelsis Deo", an episode earlier in the season, noting that the tone of "Celestial Navigation" was much lighter. The Guardian praised Aaron Sorkin for his successful experimentation with the format of the show, incorporating flashbacks. They also highlighted a line from Josh—"It starts off as a nine-to-five job, but you can pretty much count on it being blown to hell by 9.30"—that they said encapsulated the show's narrative well.

Writing for the Daily Bruin, Alex Driscoll briefly praised the episode's format of interwoven plotlines and the episode's combination of past in present in letting Josh narrating backstory to an ongoing plotline before focusing on Mendoza's being racially profiled. Driscoll writes that while Mendoza was released quietly and quickly, many cases of a victim being racially profiled do not have the same outcome. She praises Sorkin for providing attention to the point that race can matter more than guilt or innocence in determining how a suspect is treated by police. Driscoll notes in her October 2020 article that most suspects in this case will not have powerful members of the U.S. government to bail them out, and said that forms of protest similar to Mendoza's refusing of a breathalyzer test have spread across the United States.

CCH Pounder, who guest starred as Debbie O'Leary in this episode, was initially considered for the role of C. J. Cregg. Instead, Allison Janney was cast for the role.
