= The Debate (The West Wing) =

- The West Wing episode
- Episode no.: Season 7 Episode 7
- Directed by: Alex Graves
- Written by: Lawrence O'Donnell Jr.
- Production code: 2T6207
- Original air date: November 6, 2005

Episode chronology
← Previous "The Al Smith Dinner"	Next → "Undecideds"

"The Debate" is the seventh episode of the seventh season of American serial political drama The West Wing. The episode aired on November 6, 2005, on NBC. The episode was a live stage performance, recorded twice for the East and West Coasts of the United States. In this episode, Democratic presidential candidate Matt Santos and Republican presidential candidate Arnold Vinick engage in their first public debate. The episode is notable for featuring just two members of the main cast – Jimmy Smits and Alan Alda – and the only one of the entire series to feature none of the original leads.

== Synopsis ==
In the final minutes before their first debate, Congressman Matt Santos and Senator Arnold Vinick are extremely nervous – "terrified doesn't even begin to cover it," Vinick tells his campaign manager Bruno Gianelli. Vinick expresses frustration with the time limits, believing it stifles his ability to properly express his ideas, while Santos worries about effectively communicating his policies, something he has struggled with. Both candidates walk on stage, and moderator Forrest Sawyer explains the rules: two minutes to answer a question, followed by a one-minute rebuttal, followed by thirty seconds for a counterpoint at Sawyer's discretion, and candidates may not speak directly to each other. Having won the coin toss to give his opening statement first, Vinick hesitates before proposing the rules be thrown out in favor of "a real debate" with no time limits and direct conversation; though apprehensive, Santos agrees.

On the question of immigration, Vinick's advocacy of increased border patrols is offset by Santos's argument that the true issue is economic instability in Mexico driving people north. When the subject turns to Vinick's signature policy, a tax cut, he dominates despite neither he nor Santos offering a tangible plan to reduce the deficit. On public education, Santos's signature policy, he advocates new approaches to raising education standards and expresses hope the United States will rank number one in education in ten years; when Vinick denounces this as a lie, a heckler shouts "you're the liar!", which causes Sawyer to threaten to reinstate the original rules unless civility is maintained. Vinick argues that instead of trying to raise education standards, as several administrations have failed to do, America should admit that not every child can or needs go to college and adjust its aspirations accordingly, pointing to the country's history of attracting intelligent foreign students to its prestigious universities.

During the health care segment both Santos and Vinick become passionate enough to step away from their podiums, prompting a technician to give them handheld microphones. Santos advocates for everyone to have access to Medicare, which Vinick struggles to counter with his suggestion that healthcare be made tax deductible. He recovers on the subject of pharmaceutical costs, particularly when he segues into medical aid and debt relief in Africa by tying it back into his tax cuts. On the subject of job security, Vinick shocks the audience by saying he will not only create no new jobs but cut them, as he believes employment is the responsibility of entrepreneurs and businesses, while the federal government should "get out of the way" and allow this to flourish. He stumbles when he indirectly calls Santos an "unthinking liberal," which Santos turns into a speech about partisan ideology.

After a brief discussion of gun control, a question on energy becomes a heated argument about the funding each candidate receives from corporations and lobbyists, which Sawyer is forced to curtail. Santos cites the dangers of increased reliance on nuclear power, to which Vinick retorts that "nuclear power is completely safe." (When a nuclear reactor in Vinick's home state of California suffers a near-meltdown in the episode "Duck and Cover", this quote dominates the news cycle and almost derails his campaign.) He also dismisses Santos's advocacy for alternative energy sources, which leads to an argument about global warming that Sawyer is again forced to stop. Santos pledges to never go to war over oil, which Vinick mocks because he believes oil-rich countries are too economically dependent upon the U.S. to try and withhold it.

In their closing statements, Santos argues that Vinick cannot solve all of America's problems with his tax cut, and that Santos would be a president who implements new policies instead of rejecting them out of hand. Vinick envisions returning America to an era of big business and small government, giving people the freedom to choose their own futures. With that, Sawyer brings the debate to a close.

== Cast ==
- Jimmy Smits as Matt Santos, the Democratic nominee for president of the United States
- Alan Alda as Arnold Vinick, the Republican nominee for president of the United States
- Forrest Sawyer as himself, the debate moderator

== Production ==
The episode was partially scripted and partially improvised, and was shot live twice and formatted as if it were a real presidential debate, with Forrest Sawyer acting as himself as moderator. For example, the heckler who shouts at Vinick (played by executive producer Christopher Misiano) was a scripted event, but all other audience reactions (and Forrest Sawyer's reactions to them in turn) were spontaneous. Jimmy Smits told Empire that the episode was shot as if it were a play, with both Smits and Alda being given a "crash course" in debating that allowed them to improvise.

Alan Alda commented that his connection to the character allowed him to improvise, and said that he really "wanted to defeat Jimmy—I mean Jimmy as the character". When told of Alda's comment, Jimmy Smits replied "No, he wants to win".

Executive producer Lawrence O'Donnell, who wrote the episode, commented that it was "my wish-fulfillment debate". Despite the risky nature of a live performance, O'Donnell commented that he was not worried, telling the Associated Press that it would be just as fun to watch if things went wrong, akin to a "train wreck".

== Reaction and impact ==
Around 9.6 million viewers saw the episode, a significant uptick from the average of 8.2 million for the seventh season to that point and the second-highest ratings of the season after the finale. The Associated Press referred to the episode as both "startlingly realistic" and "straight out of fantasyland", wondering why real-life politicians would not emulate the open-debate format. The Plain Dealer thought that the episode was the "best fictional debate of our time" in a list of eight fictional film and television debates.

In a post-debate poll conducted by MSNBC and Zogby International of 1,208 viewers, respondents thought that Santos won the debate, by 54 to 38 percent. However, in a pre-debate poll, 59 percent of viewers favored Santos, as opposed to 29 percent who thought Vinick was the better candidate. Santos beat Vinick by only three points on the question of who was more presidential, 42 to 39. Of respondents, 78 percent thought the debate moderator, Forrest Sawyer, did an "excellent" or "good" job. While respondents felt that the debate was unrealistic, they also preferred it to a real-life debate.

In 2021, the New Jersey Globe announced that two candidates for the New Jersey Senate in the 16th legislative district, Republican Michael Pappas and Democrat Andrew Zwicker, would participate in an open debate inspired by "The Debate". The debate was set up to downsize the role of the moderator significantly, where they would only ask the first question and let both candidates continue the conversation for the remaining hour. The debate was canceled due to Pappas fighting COVID-19.
