= Secret Service code name =

Term used by US law enforcement agency

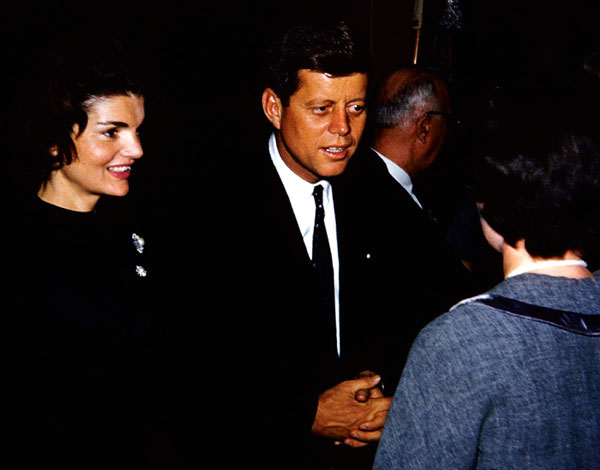
President John F. Kennedy, code name "Lancer", with First Lady Jacqueline Kennedy, code name "Lace"

The United States Secret Service uses code names for U.S. presidents, first ladies, and other prominent persons and locations. The use of such names was originally for security purposes and dates to a time when sensitive electronic communications were not routinely encrypted; today, the names simply serve for purposes of brevity, clarity, and tradition. The Secret Service does not choose these names, however. The White House Communications Agency maintains a list that candidates choose from, often choosing ones that resonate with them personally.

According to an established protocol, good codewords are unambiguous words that can be easily pronounced and readily understood by those who transmit and receive voice messages by radio or telephone regardless of their native language. Traditionally, all family members' code names start with the same letter.

The code names change over time for security purposes, but are often publicly known. For security, code names are generally picked from a list of such 'good' words, but avoiding the use of common words which could likely be intended to mean their normal definitions.

== Presidents and their families ==
- Woodrow Wilson
  - Edith Wilson – Grandma
- Franklin D. Roosevelt
  - Eleanor Roosevelt – Rover
- Harry S. Truman – General or Supervise
  - Bess Truman – Sunnyside
- Dwight D. Eisenhower – Scorecard or Providence
  - Mamie Eisenhower – Springtime
  - David Eisenhower – Sahara
- John F. Kennedy – Lancer
  - Jacqueline Kennedy – Lace
  - Caroline Kennedy – Lyric
  - John F. Kennedy Jr. – Lark
  - Rose Kennedy – Coppertone
  - Ethel Kennedy – Sundance
- Lyndon B. Johnson – Volunteer
  - Lady Bird Johnson – Victoria
  - Lynda Bird Johnson – Velvet
  - Luci Baines Johnson – Venus
- Richard Nixon – Searchlight
  - Pat Nixon – Starlight
  - Patricia Nixon Cox – Sugarfoot
  - Edward F. Cox – Seminole
  - Julie Nixon Eisenhower – Sunbonnet
- Gerald Ford – Passkey or Pass Key
  - Betty Ford – Pinafore
  - Susan Ford – Panda
  - Michael Ford – Professor
  - Jack Ford – Packman
- Jimmy Carter – Dasher which was changed to Deacon or Lock Master
  - Rosalynn Carter – Lotus Petal or Dancer
  - Amy Carter – Dynamo
  - Chip Carter – Diamond
  - Jack Carter – Derby
  - Jeff Carter – Deckhand
- Ronald Reagan – Rawhide
  - Nancy Reagan – Rainbow
  - Maureen Reagan – Rhyme, Rosebud
  - Michael Reagan – Riddler
  - Patti Davis – Ribbon
  - Ron Reagan – Reliant
  - Doria Reagan – Radiant
- George H. W. Bush – Timberwolf
  - Barbara Bush – Snowbank or Tranquility
  - Marvin Bush – Tuner
  - Neil Bush – Trapline
  - Jeb Bush – Tripper
  - Dorothy Bush – Tiller
- Bill Clinton – Eagle
  - Hillary Clinton – Evergreen
  - Chelsea Clinton – Energy
  - Roger Clinton Jr. – no code name; press claimed was Headache
- George W. Bush – Tumbler, later Trailblazer
  - Laura Bush – Tempo
  - Barbara Bush – Turquoise
  - Jenna Bush – Twinkle
- Barack Obama – Renegade
  - Michelle Obama – Renaissance
  - Malia Obama – Radiance
  - Sasha Obama – Rosebud
  - Marian Shields Robinson – Raindance
- Donald Trump – Mogul
  - Melania Trump – Muse
  - Donald Trump Jr. – Mountaineer
  - Ivanka Trump – Marvel
  - Eric Trump – Marksman
  - Jared Kushner – Mechanic
- Joe Biden – Celtic
  - Jill Biden – Capri
  - Hunter Biden – Captain

== Vice presidents and their families ==
- Spiro Agnew – Pathfinder
  - Judy Agnew – Photograph
- Nelson Rockefeller – Sandstorm
  - Happy Rockefeller – Shooting Star or Stardust
- Walter Mondale – Cavalier
  - Joan Mondale – Cameo
  - Ted Mondale – Centurion
  - Eleanor Mondale – Calico
  - William Mondale – Chessman
- Dan Quayle – Scorecard or Supervisor
  - Marilyn Quayle – Sunshine

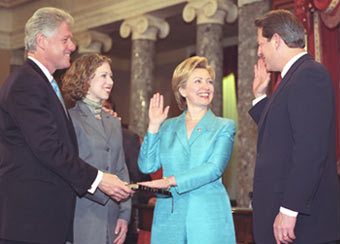
From left to right: President Bill Clinton, codename "Eagle"; Chelsea Clinton, codename "Energy"; Senator Hillary Clinton, codename "Evergreen"; Vice President Al Gore, codename "Sundance".

- Al Gore – Sundance or Sawhorse
  - Tipper Gore – Skylark
  - Karenna Gore – Smurfette
  - Kristin Gore – Silhouette
  - Sarah Gore – Screwdriver
  - Albert Gore III – Shortstop
- Dick Cheney – Angler
  - Lynne Cheney – Author
  - Elizabeth Cheney – Apollo
  - Mary Cheney – Alpine
- Mike Pence – Hoosier
  - Karen Pence – Hummingbird
- Kamala Harris – Pioneer
  - Doug Emhoff – Playmaker
  - Cole Emhoff – Pirate
  - Ella Emhoff – Pickle
- JD Vance – Bobcat

== Political candidates and their spouses ==
U.S. Secret Service codenames are often given to high-profile political candidates (such as presidential and vice presidential candidates), and their respective families and spouses who are assigned U.S. Secret Service protection. These codenames often differ from those held if they are elected or those from prior periods if they held positions needing codenames.

=== 1968 ===
- Eugene McCarthy – Instructor

=== 1972 ===
- George McGovern – Redwood

=== 1976 ===
- Jimmy Carter – Dasher or Deacon
- Bob Dole – Ramrod
  - Elizabeth Dole – Rainbow
- Morris Udall – Dashboard

=== 1980 ===
- John B. Anderson – Miracle, Starburst or Stardust
  - Keke Anderson – Scarlet
- George H. W. Bush – Sheepskin (During 1980 Campaign)
- Phil Crane – Swordfish
- Ted Kennedy – Sunburn

=== 1984 ===
- Geraldine Ferraro – Duster
  - John Zaccaro – N/A (Declined Secret Service Protection)
- John Glenn – Iron
- Jesse Jackson – Thunder
- Walter Mondale – Dragon

=== 1988 ===
- Lloyd Bentsen – Parthenon
- Michael Dukakis – Peso
  - Kitty Dukakis – Panda
- Jesse Jackson – Pontiac
- Gary Hart – Redwood
- Paul Simon – Scarlett

=== 1996 ===
- Bob Dole – Patriot
  - Elizabeth Dole – Pioneer
- Jack Kemp – Champion
  - Joanne Kemp – Cornerstone

=== 2000 ===
- Joe Lieberman – Laser
  - Hadassah Lieberman – Liberty

=== 2004 ===
- John Kerry – Minuteman
  - Teresa Heinz Kerry – Mahogany
- John Edwards – Speedway

=== 2008 ===
- John McCain – Phoenix
  - Cindy McCain – Parasol
  - Meghan McCain – Peter Sellers (Peter)
  - John Sidney McCain IV – Popeye
  - Bridget McCain – Pebbles
- Sarah Palin – Denali
  - Todd Palin – Driller

=== 2012 ===
- Mitt Romney – Javelin
  - Ann Romney – Jockey
- Rick Santorum – Petrus
- Newt Gingrich – T-Rex
- Paul Ryan – Bowhunter
  - Janna Ryan – Buttercup

=== 2016 ===
- Ben Carson – Eli
- Tim Kaine – Daredevil
  - Anne Holton – Dogwood
- Bernie Sanders – Intrepid

=== 2020 ===
- Bernie Sanders – Intrepid
- Kamala Harris – Pioneer

== Government officials ==
- Kennedy Administration
  - Cabinet
    - Secretary of State Dean Rusk – Freedom
  - Staff
    - Rear Adm. George Burkley (physician to the President) – Market
    - Senior military aide General Chester Clifton – Watchman
    - Associate Press Secretary Andrew Hatcher – Winner
    - Assistant Press Secretary Malcolm Kilduff – Warrior
    - Personal secretary Evelyn Lincoln – Willow
    - Air Force aide Godfrey McHugh – Wing
    - Special assistant and appointments secretary Kenneth O'Donnell – Wand
    - Naval aide Captain Tazewell Shepard – Witness
    - White House secretary Priscilla Wear – Fiddle
    - White House secretary Jill Cowen – Faddle
- Lyndon Johnson Administration
  - Staff
    - Walter Jenkins – Vigilant
    - Pierre Salinger – Wayside
- Nixon Administration
  - Cabinet
    - Secretary of State and National Security Advisor Henry Kissinger – Woodcutter
      - His wife, Nancy Kissinger – Woodlark
  - Staff
    - White House photographer Ollie Atkins – Hawkeye
    - Gulf Coast Regional Chairman James Baker – Fencing Master or Foxtail
    - Deputy Assistant to the President Dwight Chapin – Watchdog
    - Domestic Affairs Advisor Kenneth Reese Cole Jr. – Spectator
    - John Ehrlichman – Wisdom
    - White House aide Tim Elbourne – Snapshot
    - Secretary of State Alexander Haig – Claw Hammer
    - White House Chief of Staff H. R. Haldeman – Welcome
    - Assistant to Haldeman Lawrence Higby – Semaphore
    - Air Force aide James D. Hughes – Red Barron
    - Communications Director Herbert G. Klein – Witness
    - Dr. William Lukash (physician to the President) – Sawhorse
    - Senior assistant Clark MacGregor – Whipcrack
    - Assistant for Legislative Affairs William Timmons – Windowpane
    - Dr. Walter Tkach (Physician to the president) – Signature
    - Director of the White House Office of Presidential Advance, later Director of the National Park Service, Ronald H. Walker – Roadrunner
    - Personal secretary Rose Mary Woods – Strawberry
    - Press Secretary and Assistant to the President Ron Ziegler – Whale Boat
    - Presidential spokesman Ken W. Clawson – Thunderstorm
- Ford Administration
  - Staff
    - Press Secretary Ron Nessen – Clam Chowder
    - Deputy Chief of Staff, later Chief of Staff, Dick Cheney – Backseat
- Carter Administration
  - Cabinet
    - Secretary of State Cyrus Vance – Fade Away
    - Secretary of Defense Harold Brown – Finley
  - Staff
    - National Security Advisor Zbigniew Brzeziński – Hawkeye
    - Director of the Office of Management and Budget Bert Lance – Dumbo
- Reagan Administration
  - Attorney General William French Smith – Flivver
  - Secretary of Education Terrel Bell – Foxcraft
- George W. Bush Administration
  - Scott McClellan – Matrix (generic name for White House press secretary)
  - Chief of Staff Andy Card – Potomac, later Patriot
  - Chief of Staff Josh Bolten – Fatboy
  - Secretary of Labor Elaine Chao – Firebird
- Obama Administration
  - Chief of Staff Rahm Emanuel – Black Hawk
  - Tim Geithner – Fencing Master (generic codename for Secretary of the Treasury)
- First Trump administration
  - Senior Counselor to the President Kellyanne Conway – Blueberry

== Other individuals ==
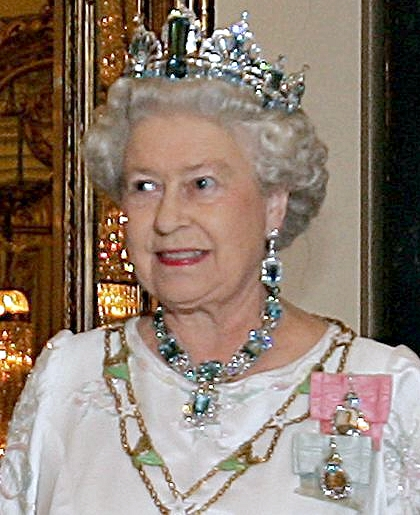
Queen Elizabeth II, codename "Kittyhawk".

- Israel
  - Prime Minister Menachem Begin – Cedar
    - Hasia Begin Milo – Crystal
- Commonwealth realms
  - Queen Elizabeth II – Kittyhawk, Redfern
  - King Charles III – Principal or Unicorn
- United States
  - Senator Howard Baker (R-Tennessee) – Snapshot
  - Actor Antonio Banderas – Zorro
  - Congressman and Speaker of the House Thomas P. "Tip" O'Neill – Flag Day
  - Florida banker and businessman, confidant of President Nixon, Bebe Rebozo – Christopher
  - Social secretary to First Lady Eleanor Roosevelt, and mistress to President Franklin D. Roosevelt, Lucy Mercer Rutherfurd – Mrs. Johnson
  - Singer and actor Frank Sinatra – Napoleon
  - Senator Strom Thurmond (R-South Carolina) – Footprint
- Vatican
  - Pope John Paul II – Halo

== Locations, objects, places and parts of Secret Service ==
U.S. Secret Service codenames are not only given to people; they are often given to places, locations and even objects, such as aircraft like Air Force One, and vehicles such as the Presidential State Car.

- Joint Base Andrews, in Prince George's County, Maryland – Acrobat or Andy
- The Presidential Motorcade – Bamboo
- The Harry S Truman Building (Department of State headquarters) – Birds-eye
- Camp David, presidential retreat in Catoctin Mountain Park, in Frederick County, Maryland – Cactus or Buckeye
- The Vice President's office – Cobweb
- The Vice President's staff – Pacemaker
- The Waldorf-Astoria Hotel, New York City – Roadhouse
- Air Force One – Angel or Cowpuncher
- The U.S. Presidential State Car – Stagecoach
  - Follow-up car – Halfback
- The White House – Castle (Crown referring to the Executive Mansion, the central representative and office spaces of the White House)
- The Capitol – Punch bowl
- The White House Situation Room – Cement Mixer
- Eisenhower Executive Office Building (part of the White House Complex) – Central
- Reagan National Airport – Curbside
- The temporary residence of the President – Charcoal or Base
- The Pentagon – Calico
- White House garage – Carpet
- J. Edgar Hoover Building (FBI Headquarters) – Cork
- Lyndon Baines Johnson's ranch – Volcano
- Secret Service Counterassault Team – Hawkeye
- Secret Service Counter-sniper Team – Hercules

== In fiction ==
In popular culture, the practice of assigning codenames is often used to provide additional verisimilitude in fictional works about the executive branch, or high-ranking governmental figures.

- 1600 Penn
  - First Son Standrich "Skip" Gilchrist Jr. – Meatball
- Air Force One
  - President James Marshall – Boy Scout
- The American President
  - President Andrew Shepherd – Liberty
- Chasing Liberty
  - First Daughter Anna Foster – Liberty
- Designated Survivor
  - President Tom Kirkman – Phoenix (formerly Glasses during his time as Secretary of Housing and Urban Development)
- First Daughter
  - First Daughter Samantha Mackenzie – Lucky Charm
- First Kid
  - President Paul Davenport – Eagle
  - First Son Luke Davenport – Prince
- House of Cards
  - President Frank Underwood – Little John
  - President Claire Underwood – Lone Star
- In the Line of Fire
  - The President – Traveler
- Jericho
  - President Jon Tomarchio – Condor
- The Night Agent
  - Maddie Redfield (VP Daughter) – Badger
  - Omar Zadar (PIF leader) – Osprey
- Paradise
  - President Cal Bradford – Wildcat
- The Prodigal Daughter
  - President Florentyna Kane – Baroness
- Red, White & Royal Blue
  - First Son Alexander Claremont-Diaz – Barracuda
  - First Daughter June Claremont-Diaz – Bluebonnet
  - Prince Henry – Bishop
- Scandal
  - President Fitzgerald Thomas "Fitz" Grant III – Falcon
  - First Lady Melody Margaret "Mellie" Grant – Foxtail
  - White House Chief of Staff Abigail "Abby" Whelan – Firebrand
- The Sentinel
  - President John Ballentine – Classic
  - First Lady Sara Ballentine – Cincinnati
- Squeeze Me
  - The President – Mastodon
  - The First Lady – Mockingbird
- Tom Clancy's novels
  - Unnamed President in Clear and Present Danger – Wrangler
  - President Jack Ryan in Debt of Honor and Executive Orders – Swordsman
    - Dr. Caroline "Cathy" Ryan in Executive Orders – Surgeon
    - Olivia "Sally" Ryan in Executive Orders – Shadow
    - Jack Ryan Jr. in Executive Orders – Shortstop
    - Katie Ryan in Executive Orders – Sandbox
    - Kyle Daniel Ryan in The Bear and the Dragon – Sprite
  - George Winston (Secretary of the Treasury) in Executive Orders – Trader
  - Benjamin Goodley (National Security Advisor) in Executive Orders – Cardsharp
  - Arnold Van Damm (White House Chief of Staff) in Executive Orders and The Bear and the Dragon – Carpenter
  - Callie Weston (Chief Speechwriter) in Executive Orders and The Bear and the Dragon – Calliope
  - Scott Adler (Secretary of State) in Executive Orders and The Bear and the Dragon – Eagle
- Veep
  - Vice President Selina Meyer – Duchess
- The West Wing
  - President Josiah "Jed" Bartlet – Eagle or Liberty
  - Zoey Bartlet – Bookbag
  - C. J. Cregg – Flamingo
  - Sam Seaborn – Princeton
  - Gus Westin (grandson of Jed Bartlet) – Tonka
  - Arnold Vinick – Big Sur

== See also ==
- 00 Agent § Origin of nomenclature
- CIA cryptonym
- List of nicknames of United States Presidents
