= Arnold Vinick =

American TV character, created 2004

- Alan Alda as Arnold Vinick
- First appearance: "In the Room"
- Last appearance: "Tomorrow"
- Portrayed by: Alan Alda

In-universe information
- Nickname: Arnie; "Big Sur" (Secret Service code name); "Beltway Arnie"
- Occupation: Four-term U.S. Senator (R-CA); U.S. Presidential Candidate; Incoming Secretary of State
- Affiliation: Republican
- Family: Richard Vinick (father); Patricia Vinick (mother)
- Spouse: Catherine Vinick (deceased)
- Relatives: Four children, nine grandchildren, one brother
- Home: Santa Paula, California

Arnold Vinick is a fictional character from the television series The West Wing played by Alan Alda. The role earned Alda a Primetime Emmy Award for Outstanding Supporting Actor in a Drama Series in 2006.

== Fictional biography ==
Vinick is the senior Republican senator from California and a presidential nominee.

He is a social moderate and fiscal conservative with a maverick streak and direct manner, whose policies are loosely based on those of real-life Arizona senators John McCain and Barry Goldwater. Vinick is moderately pro-choice in the sense he is opposed to partial-birth abortion and in favor of parental consent laws. He is also in favor of immigration reform and against gay marriage but is reluctant to use it as a campaign issue. Vinick opposes the Religious Right's influence in the Republican Party and wants to return to more traditional, limited government conservatism. He has also been described as a deficit hawk, supporting "two-for-one" tax and spending cuts. Vinick favors free trade agreements, school vouchers, and tort reform while opposing ethanol subsidies in the Midwest as corporate welfare. He is conservative on law-and-order issues, such as gun rights, border security, and the death penalty. Vinick is mixed on foreign policy as he believes in a strong national defense and supports tough action against Iran, but was also described as an ally of Democrat Josiah Bartlet on foreign policy issues and a potential advocate for loosening the embargo on Cuba. During his 2006 campaign, it is stated Vinick has strong support from corporate conservatives, neoconservatives, Libertarians, Independents, and moderate Democrats, but his support is weak among social and religious conservatives.

In one episode, Vinick mentioned growing up in a "citrus-growing" community. In response to this, the town of Santa Paula, which is famous for citrus growing and is often referred to as the "Citrus Capital of the World," wrote to The West Wing's production company, asking that Santa Paula be made Vinick's hometown. The production company promised to keep Santa Paula in mind for any campaign filming. In the meantime, the city council decided to organize a campaign for Vinick, including opening an Arnold Vinick presidential campaign headquarters. The town was eventually mentioned as Vinick's hometown in the episode "Two Weeks Out," broadcast on March 19, 2006.

=== Personal life ===
The son of Richard Vinick, a New York City public school teacher, and Patricia Vinick, a community activist, Vinick was born in New York Methodist Hospital in Brooklyn. Four years later, his younger brother was born, and the family relocated to the southern California town of Santa Paula in order to farm orange groves. In Santa Paula, Vinick volunteered at the public library. Vinick was married to Catherine Vinick for around 30 years before she died. According to the NBC website, she died in 2004, and in "In God We Trust," it is stated Vinick stopped attending church with her "five or six years" before he won the Republican nomination because she was too sick to attend with him. He has one brother, four children, and nine grandchildren.

After graduating from Yale and Stanford Law School, Vinick opened a law practice in Santa Paula. He was eventually elected to the city council in the town's first write-in victory. He served one term on the board before being elected to the California State Assembly. He then moved on to the United States Senate, where he won the election with 6.9 million votes–the highest total for any Senate candidate at the time (Barbara Boxer in 2004, Dianne Feinstein in 2012, Kamala Harris in 2016, and Adam Schiff in 2024 are the only senators to have ever matched this number in the real world). Vinick has served in the Senate for 24 years as of the 2006 election (thereby eliminating the terms of Pete Wilson, John Seymour, and Dianne Feinstein in the real world), meaning he won the election in 1982 (the year Wilson was elected).

=== Politics ===
According to the NBC website, Vinick serves as chairman of the Senate Finance Committee and served as chairman of the Committee on Foreign Relations, while serving on the Environment and Public Works Committee. However, when he is first introduced, it is also mentioned that as a freshman senator, he sat on the Judiciary Committee and befriended then-committee staffer Eric Baker, who would later become the Governor of Pennsylvania and a Democratic presidential/vice presidential contender. In the same episode, it is also stated Vinick is the chairman of a committee that has been continually investigating the Bartlet Administration (a role he does not like), implying he may be chairing the Judiciary Committee and possibly contradicting the website account, as senators generally only chair one committee.

Vinick was offered the post of Ambassador to the United Nations by President Josiah Bartlet's Deputy Chief of Staff, Josh Lyman, but declined as he intended to run for president. Lyman and former White House Chief of Staff Leo McGarry were concerned that Vinick, as an articulate and appealing centrist who might carry California in the Electoral College, offered the Republicans a real chance to win back the White House after two terms of Bartlet, a Democrat. However, both questioned if he was conservative enough to win the Republican nomination.

Vinick opposes federal funding for ethanol as an alcohol fuel, considering it a political boondoggle. He once told Josh Lyman, half-seriously, that he does not trust anyone who does not "shine his own shoes." In the primaries, Vinick defeated the Reverend Don Butler and former Speaker of the House and Acting President Glen Allen Walken for the Republican nomination in the 2006 presidential election. Shortly after winning the nomination, Vinick met with Bartlet, with whom he shares a mutual respect, to discuss a deal to raise both the federal debt ceiling and the national minimum wage.

After the Reverend Butler declined to be his running mate in the 2006 election due to Butler's strong anti-abortion views, Vinick, who felt he needed a staunch conservative to balance the ticket, selected Governor Ray Sullivan of West Virginia.

It is hinted in several episodes that Vinick is an atheist, agnostic, or otherwise religious skeptic. Though this has been hinted at in his public statements, he has not made an explicit statement on the matter. Vinick may also be a book collector, having received a 17th-century King James Bible from his late wife. Her death and the harsh requirements of Old Testament Judaic law, which he discovered when he read the Bible in depth, made him question his own religious beliefs.

=== Presidential campaign ===
In the seventh season of the show, Vinick and Sullivan are running against Congressman Matt Santos of Texas, the Democratic nominee, and his running mate, former White House Chief of Staff and Secretary of Labor Leo McGarry. Democratic political consultant Bruno Gianelli is a consultant on his campaign, initially with an ambitious plan to win all 50 states.

Throughout the campaign, Vinick and Santos treat each other with mutual respect (in the episode "King Corn," it is revealed that two years before the election, Vinick and Santos co-sponsored an immigration reform bill that was defeated in committee on Capitol Hill).

At the outset of the only Santos–Vinick debate, Vinick proposes they have "a real debate," without time limits on speaking (i.e., to ignore the rules to which their campaigns have agreed), to which Santos agrees. During the debate, Vinick tries to paint Santos as a typical liberal Democrat who would raise taxes to pay for intrusive big government programs while still leaving the federal budget unbalanced. The Senator laid out a moderate agenda and reiterated his support for tax cuts, proposed tax-deductibility for health insurance costs, explained why he had voted for the Central American Free Trade Agreement, opposed a moratorium on the federal death penalty, promised to open part of the Arctic National Wildlife Refuge to oil exploration, and declared his strong support for nuclear power. He is heckled by a member of the audience for claiming that Head Start didn't work, but perhaps his most surprising comment and show of blunt honesty is his remark that he would not create any new jobs, saying that, in a free society, entrepreneurs, not the government, create jobs.

In the middle of the campaign, as Vinick enjoys a massive lead over Santos, a nuclear reactor in Southern California comes close to meltdown, creating a panic for millions living in the vicinity. In the episode "Duck and Cover" it is revealed that Vinick, as a Senator from California, pushed for the plant's opening and speedy approval by regulators. The reactor does not melt down, although when the story breaks that Vinick was a significant supporter of the plant, his poll numbers drop dramatically, putting numerous states, including California (which, despite leaning Democratic in presidential elections in both reality and the show, was thought to be safe for Vinick, given that was his home state), into play and causing the election to become too close to call.

After a staff shakeup prompted by the Republican National Committee, Vinick decides to go to California on the heels of the Santos campaign, and hold a press conference outside of the San Andreo plant in order to defuse the political fallout from the incident. His strategy seems to work, as he returns to his straight-talking style, exhausting reporters of their questions and commandeering live news coverage of his opponent's campaign.

Despite this strategy's success (Vinick wins his home state of California), Vinick loses the presidential election to Santos by 272 electoral votes to 266. Vinick concedes the election after Nevada, the decisive state, is carried by Santos by about 30,000 votes. Though Vinick is urged by his staff to contest the election, he refuses to do so, saying "I will be a winner or a loser, but I will not be a sore loser."

=== Secretary of State ===
After the election, Vinick appears to be positioning himself to run again in four years against Santos, but his advisors try to convince him that there are other Republicans who should run and that his age would be a hindrance (it is stated that Vinick would be seventy by the next election). Impressed by his foreign policy acuity and feeling that no Democrat could do the job equally well, President-elect Santos asks Vinick, his first choice, to join his administration as Secretary of State with Santos saying to Vinick, "You are the best strategic thinker I know." Vinick initially turns him down, but his top aides persuade him that another run at the presidency would be futile and tell him he could go down in history as "the last honorable Senator and a great Secretary of State." Initially skeptical, Vinick accepts when Santos assures him that he can perform the job on his own terms, without the politics. The agreement is sealed when Santos turns to Vinick for advice on a situation involving China, Kazakhstan, and Russia. Vinick is last seen in the series finale attending the presidential inauguration, with the news reporting that he will be joining the Santos administration.

== Development ==
Comparisons have been made between Vinick and Arizona Senator John McCain, who was the Republican presidential candidate in the 2008 Presidential Election. However, West Wing writer and producer Eli Attie insists that the character is not based on any real-life politician, but was simply a function of the casting of Alan Alda. Alda, a staunch Democrat in real life, described Vinick in moderately favorable terms, telling an interviewer "I think some of Vinick's ideas make sense."

An April 10, 2006, article in The New York Times reported that, if not for the death of actor John Spencer (Leo McGarry), Vinick would have won the election. According to the article, the writers felt it would be too depressing for Santos to lose his running mate and the election in one day, so the plot was changed to have Vinick narrowly lose.

Statements from executive producer John Wells, however, contradicted claims about a previously planned Vinick victory. The script showing Santos winning was written long before Spencer's death. In 2008, executive producer Lawrence O'Donnell Jr. stated to cameras, "We actually planned at the outset for Jimmy Smits to win, that was our... just... plan of how this was all going to work, but the Vinick character came on so strong in the show and was so effective, it became a real contest... and it became a real contest in the West Wing writer's room."
