= C. J. Cregg =

American TV character

- The West Wing character
- Allison Janney as C. J. Cregg
- First appearance: "Pilot", September 22, 1999
- Last appearance: "Tomorrow", May 14, 2006
- Created by: Aaron Sorkin
- Portrayed by: Allison Janney

In-universe information
- Full name: Claudia Jean Cregg
- Nickname: Flamingo (secret service codename)
- Occupation: White House Press Secretary (Seasons 1–6); White House Chief of Staff (Seasons 6–7)
- Family: Talmidge Cregg (father)
- Spouse: Danny Concannon (married post-series)
- Children: 1
- Nationality: American

Claudia Jean Cregg is a fictional character played by Allison Janney on the American television drama The West Wing. From the beginning of the series in 1999 until the sixth season in 2004, she was the White House Press Secretary in the administration of President Josiah Bartlet. After that, she serves as the president's chief of staff until the end of the show in 2006. The character is partially inspired by real-life White House Press Secretary Dee Dee Myers, who worked as a consultant on the show.

Aaron Sorkin, the show's creator, designed C. J. to be assertive and independent from the show's men; though she is portrayed as a smart, strong, witty, and thoughtful character, she is frequently patronized and objectified by her male coworkers. She is sometimes shown as overly emotional, a trait criticized by reviewers as a misogynistic stereotype. Her onscreen romance with Danny Concannon (Timothy Busfield), a senior White House reporter, was also criticized by commentators as giving the impression she was betraying her coworkers. Initially, she is portrayed as politically inept, but she quickly becomes one of the most savvy characters on the show.

Despite C. J.'s shortcomings and surroundings, she is considered among the best characters ever written by Aaron Sorkin. The character proved to be Janney's breakthrough role and earned her widespread critical acclaim, as well as multiple offers to enter the real-life American political realm. For her performance, she received four Primetime Emmy Awards, as well as four Screen Actors Guild Awards and four nominations for the Golden Globe Award. She reprised her role at a real-life 2016 White House press briefing, the 2017 Not the White House Correspondents' Dinner, and a 2020 special episode.

== Creation ==
On The West Wing, C. J. Cregg is played by Allison Janney. The character is said to have been partially inspired by Dee Dee Myers, who worked as the White House Press Secretary to Bill Clinton and was a consultant to the show. West Wing creator Aaron Sorkin denied this, commenting that "I'm a fiction writer. I make stuff up".

=== Casting ===
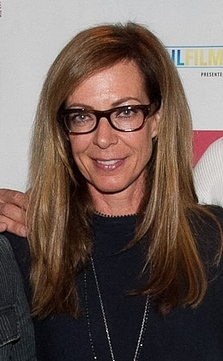
Allison Janney, portrayer of C. J. Cregg, in 2014

Aaron Sorkin had previously seen Janney in the 1998 film Primary Colors and was impressed by a scene in which Janney tripped down a flight of stairs. Janel Moloney tried out for the role, but she was asked to play assistant Donna Moss instead. Moloney later became a regular on the show.

The casting of C. J. Cregg was jeopardized by worries of a lack of racial diversity in the show's original lineup. According to Sorkin, both the show's crew and the network were concerned that every actor who had been selected so far was white. Janney, a white woman, was the favorite for the role – despite her impression that she had botched the audition. CCH Pounder, who is Guyanese, was also auditioning well. In the end, Sorkin remarked, "when we closed our eyes at night we wanted Allison. So we cast Allison". Pounder later guest-starred in the season one episode "Celestial Navigation" as the Secretary of Housing and Urban Development.

Janney has stated that she is not like C. J., quipping to The Daily Telegraph that "C. J. is incredibly brilliant – and I am an actor who memorizes lines". She notes that politics overwhelm her, unlike her savvy and well-adapted character, and recalled that fans of the show initially expect her to behave like C. J. before discovering who she really is. Janney also remarked that she enjoyed acting in episodes that were more focused on the personal lives of the characters, noting, "I'm more of a person who loves to deal with relationships and emotions".

=== Appearance ===
C. J.'s usual costume on the show was a dark pantsuit, sometimes by Calvin Klein or Armani. To convey a casual feel, a dove grey or beige blouse would be included under the pantsuit, as well as an occasional dark tank top. Another option was a skirt that fell at or past the knees. The costume was designed with more masculine effects; costume designer Lyn Paolo commented that Allison Janney's height of 6 feet (1.8 metres) allowed for a "longer drape". C. J.'s height was the subject of multiple jokes on the show, including being assigned the Secret Service code name "Flamingo" during her time in the White House. Paolo also remarked on a podcast that the clothing was designed to not distract from the show; in one episode set in a gala, a reporter asks what C. J. is wearing. She simply replies, "it's a dress".

In the episode "Isaac and Ishmael", which was produced in the aftermath of the September 11 attacks, C. J. wore a piece of jewelry called the "Lagos Heart of Freedom", which depicted a silver heart studded with precious gems to depict the flag of the United States. The jewelry was sent to Lyn Paolo for free by the designer's public relations firm; the Universal Press Syndicate referred to it as "fall's No. I fashion statement".

C. J. is frequently portrayed as clumsy or even dyspraxic. In her very first scene on the show, she falls off a treadmill while attempting to answer her pager. Over the course of the show, C. J. falls into her own swimming pool, hurls a basketball through a window, falls over from recoil at a target range, and clumsily fails to cast a fishing line, while her father (who has Alzheimer's disease) encounters no such difficulties.

== Character role and development ==
In the first six seasons of The West Wing, C. J. works as the White House Press Secretary under President Josiah Bartlet. In the sixth-season episode "Liftoff", she was promoted to succeed Leo McGarry as White House Chief of Staff, following Leo's resignation after a major heart attack. She remains chief of staff until the final episode, leaving the White House after the inauguration of President Matt Santos. She had joined Bartlet's first presidential campaign after being fired from her job at an entertainment industry public relations firm in Beverly Hills.

Initially, C. J.'s character was poorly developed; Aaron Sorkin admitted in a companion book that C. J. was "the most underwritten role of the pilot". Sorkin commented that after several episodes, it became clear to the crew that Allison Janney and her character were going to be a key part of the show. Janney appears in all 154 episodes of The West Wing. She reprised her role in a 2020 reunion special with nearly all of the original cast, termed "A West Wing Special to Benefit When We All Vote".

=== Personality ===
According to Aaron Sorkin, C. J. was designed to stand out from other female characters of the era; he writes in the pilot of the West Wing Script Book that C. J.'s role is not about "when is Mr. Right going to come along and save me from this?" C. J.'s character was shown to be an adept, empathetic, confident, witty, and independent one with considerable depth, and the only female character portrayed as intellectually on par with the male senior staff. Patrick Webster, in his book Windows into The West Wing, attributed this partially to the acting ability of Allison Janney. C. J. also suffers from anxiety and self-doubt, as well as what Elle referred to as the "standard office-gal trope" of "bitchiness and hysteria". A flashback from "In The Shadow of Two Gunmen Part 2", the second episode of the second season, shows that C. J. is the only character to doubt whether she is qualified for the role in the Bartlet campaign she is being offered, despite her not being the only character to have a thin political résumé.

C. J. is often shown to be a more emotionally vulnerable character, and sometimes stereotyped as subject to her own feelings. Since The West Wing frequently mixes the personal lives and professional careers of its characters, this tendency has the effect of letting her feelings influence her views on policy. In the third-season episode "The Women of Qumar", C. J. learns that the United States is renewing its lease on a military base there. She has a deep-seated emotional reaction to this news throughout the episode, culminating in a scene in her office with the National Security Advisor, Nancy McNally. C. J. reveals her reasoning for her opposition, telling her that "they beat women, Nancy. They hate women. The only reason they keep Qumari women alive is to make more Qumari men". McNally is not swayed by this reasoning, arguing that the base is strategically pragmatic, and after C. J. unsuccessfully counters with a long-winded analogy to apartheid, she simply pleaded, "they're beating the women, Nancy!" After McNally walks away, C. J. regains control of her emotions and neutrally delivers the news to the press in her briefing. Webster opined that although this scene allowed for a powerful emotional statement on the issue for the viewer, it also revealed a gender bias in the writing of C. J.'s character. Author Shawn Parry-Giles commented that scenes like these play into the stereotype in which women are portrayed as too subjective and emotional for rational, political decision-making.

=== White House press secretary ===
One of the great mysteries of Hollywood – nay, of life – is that Aaron Sorkin is a fairly condescending and certainly problematic writer of women. And yet so goes C.J. She's not immune to Sorkin's missteps. Her entire backstory as a Hollywood publicist who doesn't seem to know much about Hollywood or publicity never made one lick of sense. And in the early seasons, she was the White House staffer most prone to making mistakes on the job. But her capability and combination of strength and simple compassion represented the fantasy of the Bartlet White House better than anyone. And have you seen her pull off "The Jackal"?

– Joe Reid, The Atlantic (2014)

As White House press secretary, C. J. is the most influential and visible woman on The West Wing. However, this role still positions her as a supporting character – her job is to spin the actions and policies of the president, but she does not have a hand in shaping that policy the way the male characters do.

Initially, C. J. is portrayed as politically inept. She was shown to be clueless with respect to basic government functions, needing to be informed of the purpose of the U.S. census by Sam Seaborn in one first-season episode. She also admits elsewhere to having little understanding of White House economic policies. Her romance with White House reporter Danny Concannon also entangles with her job, causing her colleagues to distrust her; in the first-season episode "Lord John Marbury", the senior staff chooses to lie to her about troop movement in an Indo-Pakistani conflict, because they thought that she was too friendly with the press, particularly Danny, and would not be able to lie from the podium. In the press briefing room, she is asked by a reporter about the troop movement, which she laughingly denies; her having to retract the statement later damages her credibility with the press. Also, in the first-season episode "Mandatory Minimums", C. J. receives the staff's blame when Danny publishes a memo from a staffer, criticizing the president's performance. C. J. tells Danny in another episode that a relationship would damage her reputation; Shawn Parry-Giles opined that C. J. could not be involved with Danny while in the White House because the staff would see her only as the "woman-as-traitor" trope.

C. J. develops into a politically astute character, sometimes more so than her male counterparts. Drawing on the previous incident in "Lord John Marbury", C. J. lies to the press in the first-season finale "What Kind of Day Has It Been", confidently delivering the misinformation directly to Danny. In "The Leadership Breakfast", C. J. correctly assesses that Toby Ziegler is ordering her to make a political mistake, which results in a congressman directly criticizing the president during a joint presidential and congressional press conference. Josh Lyman later comments to her that "you had a lot of opportunities to say 'I told you so' and score some points with Leo. You're a class act". In another episode, she thwarts a general who plans to give a television interview that would embarrass the president by questioning his military authority. Though the general calls her "kitten" when they meet, C. J. remains calm and points out that in her background research, she noticed that he has fraudulently obtained a medal for an act of service he never performed; the general attempts to return the conversation to Bartlet, but C. J. ends the conversation, cutting him off with "is there anything else, sir?"

=== Romance ===
As well as her on-again-off-again romance with Danny, C. J. has another love interest throughout the third season – a secret service agent named Simon Donovan (Mark Harmon), assigned to protect her after she receives death threats. C. J. is initially resistant to Donovan's assignment, struggling to preserve her autonomy. Over time, she falls in love with Donovan and submits to his protection; Shawn Parry-Giles argued that this transformation shows that she is treated like a "prized and revered object of protection" with no need or capability for autonomy. Donovan refuses to return her affection while he is assigned to her, but the threat to C. J. abates, meaning that he was no longer tasked with her protection. Just as the two are about to begin a relationship, Donovan is shot and killed while stopping a robbery at a New York City Bodega.

In the final season premiere, "The Ticket", a scene showing the characters "three years later" forecast C. J. as married to Danny with one child. This is realized in the series finale, "Tomorrow"; in the episode, C. J. leaves the White House, choosing to pursue a relationship with Danny instead of remaining as a special counselor to President Santos.

=== Sexism from other characters ===
Like many female characters on The West Wing, C. J. is frequently condescended to, and even objectified by, the show's men. In a scene from the first-season episode "The Crackpots and These Women", the president and Leo look around a room full of women working in the White House, complimenting each one in a gendered manner. C. J. in particular is compared to "a fifties movie star, so capable, so loving and energetic". Essayist Laura K. Garrett writes that the president's comment makes C. J. seem like "a lovable pet, not a professional woman".

In another first-season episode, "Lies, Damn Lies, and Statistics", the president's senior staff predicts the results of an upcoming poll. Most staffers predicted that the president's poll numbers would drop, or hold steady at best, but C. J. predicted a large bump. Leo, who relayed the staffers' guesses to the president, left out C. J.'s predictions; she suspected this was because she was a woman. In the end, C. J. was shown to have made the correct prediction.

In the second-season episode "Bartlet's Third State of the Union", C. J. appears on a television show to discuss the president's State of the Union address, where she is introduced by the host as the "very lovely, the very talented – Claudia Jean Cregg". The host then tells the entire room during a commercial break that C. J. is not wearing pants. In "Ways and Means", C. J. is sexualized by Bruno Gianelli, manager of the president's re-election campaign, who remarks "man, you have got a killer body, you know that?"

== Reception ==
Reviewers have praised C. J.'s portrayal, both during and after the show's run. Frazier Moore with the Associated Press described her in 2000 as "a scrapper with an enormous heart, many fallibilities, and a gift for snappy repartee". The BBC remarked that C. J. "might make the list for best chief of staff of all time, save for the fact that she's fictional". In 2014, The Atlantic ranked C. J. highest on their list of the 144 best characters on The West Wing, writer Joe Reid commenting that "her capability and combination of strength and simple compassion represented the fantasy of the Bartlet White House better than anyone". In their list of the best characters from all television serials created by Sorkin, Vulture ranked C. J. second, commenting that "if all the Sorkin women were as classy, self-assured, and legitimately funny (the turkey pardon!) as C. J., we'd never have had the Sorkin woman argument in the first place".

Reviewers also lauded Janney's performance; The Cincinnati Enquirer wrote in 2001 that Janney "combines comedy, drama, and political savvy" in C. J., approving of her ability to alternate between wit and seriousness throughout each episode. C. J. Cregg proved to be Allison Janney's breakthrough role. Janney's performance was also lauded by her fellow cast members. In an interview with Empire magazine, Martin Sheen (who played President Bartlet) recounted an instance in which the cast, in a confidential, anonymous poll, unanimously agreed that Janney was "the very best among us". Janney's four Emmy awards from The West Wing outpaced every other cast member. She also received four Screen Actors Guild awards for her performance on The West Wing, and many other awards and nominations. Janney reported receiving letters of appreciation for her portrayal of C. J. from women viewers.

List of major awards and nominations received by Allison Janney for her portrayal of C. J. Cregg
Organization	Year	Category	Result	Ref
Golden Globe Awards	2001	Best Supporting Actress – Series, Miniseries or Television Film	Nominated	
Golden Globe Awards	2002	Best Supporting Actress – Series, Miniseries or Television Film	Nominated	
Golden Globe Awards	2003	Best Actress – Television Series Drama	Nominated	
Golden Globe Awards	2004	Best Actress – Television Series Drama	Nominated	
Primetime Emmy Awards	2000	Outstanding Supporting Actress in a Drama Series	Won	
Primetime Emmy Awards	2001	Outstanding Supporting Actress in a Drama Series	Won	
Primetime Emmy Awards	2002	Outstanding Lead Actress in a Drama Series	Won	
Primetime Emmy Awards	2003	Outstanding Lead Actress in a Drama Series	Nominated	
Primetime Emmy Awards	2004	Outstanding Lead Actress in a Drama Series	Won	
Primetime Emmy Awards	2006	Outstanding Lead Actress in a Drama Series	Nominated	
Screen Actors Guild Awards	2002	Outstanding Performance by a Female Actor in a Drama Series	Won	
Screen Actors Guild Awards	2002	Outstanding Performance by an Ensemble Cast in a Drama Series	Won	
Screen Actors Guild Awards	2003	Outstanding Performance by a Female Actor in a Drama Series	Won	
Screen Actors Guild Awards	2003	Outstanding Performance by an Ensemble Cast in a Drama Series	Won	
Screen Actors Guild Awards	2004	Outstanding Performance by a Female Actor in a Drama Series	Nominated	
Screen Actors Guild Awards	2004	Outstanding Performance by an Ensemble Cast in a Drama Series	Nominated	
Screen Actors Guild Awards	2005	Outstanding Performance by an Ensemble Cast in a Drama Series	Nominated	

== Legacy ==
Allison Janney's appearance at the White House Press Briefing on April 29, 2016

After the show ended in 2006, Allison Janney was offered political punditry roles in several news organizations, as well as several requests to campaign for Democratic candidates. Janney declined, telling The Guardian that "you really don't want to hire me. I'm not good in that area". In 2018, Janney remarked on The Graham Norton Show that people often assumed that she was similar to C. J., but that the two were not alike in reality. Janney commented that "it made me very shy of meeting people because I wasn't her. I would love to be like her, she was thrilling".

On April 29, 2016, Janney made an appearance at a White House Press Briefing in place of actual Press Secretary Josh Earnest to raise awareness of opioid use disorder. Janney made humorous references to her time on The West Wing, including a joke about "Josh [Earnest] getting a root canal", a reference to an episode in which Josh Lyman conducts a press briefing while C. J. recovers from an emergency root canal.

In 2017, Janney reprised her role as C. J. for the pre-taped introduction of Not the White House Correspondents' Dinner. Appearing to brief the press, C. J. answers several bad-faith questions from reporters before going on a monologue, arguing that this kind of questioning detracts from real journalism and that these kinds of reporters should not be listened to.

In 2021, C. J. Cregg became a "trending topic" on Twitter after the first press conference of Joe Biden's press secretary, Jen Psaki. Psaki was compared favorably to C. J. online for her dry wit, as well as her straightforward answers, Allison Janney commenting that she was "flattered" by the comparison. Mary McNamara of the Los Angeles Times criticized the comparison, commenting that although she loved C. J.'s character, the comparisons were indicative of the outgoing press secretary's constant battles with the press being over; not Psaki's objective merit. In 2022, Teen Vogue highlighted the comparison between C. J. and Psaki as a negative; the article criticized Psaki's style as glib and attention seeking, attitudes expected instead from television characters like C. J.

== Works cited ==
=== Articles and tweets ===
- "15 things you didn't know about The West Wing". Empire.
- Moore, Frazier (August 9, 2000). "Allison Janney: A towering figure on The West Wing". The Anniston Star. Associated Press. Archived from the original on December 29, 2021 – via Newspapers.com.
- DeWitt, Barbara (November 1, 2000). "Prime-time panache". Fort Worth Star-Telegram. Los Angeles Daily News. Second clipping in the Austin American-Statesman for Janney specifically – via newspapers.com.
- Kiesewetter, John (October 18, 2001). "Meet the press secretary". The Cincinnati Enquirer. pp. F1, F2 – via Newspapers.com.
- McLaughlin, Patricia (December 14, 2001). "It's a grand old flag: Patriotic lapel pins vie for public favor". Kenosha News. Universal Press Syndicate – via newspapers.com.
- Shister, Gail (November 4, 2004). "Hail to the new chief of staff on 'The West Wing'". The Orlando Sentinel. The Philadelphia Inquirer. Archived from the original on March 6, 2022 – via Newspapers.com.
- Gilbert, Matthew (May 16, 2006). "'West Wing' exits with dignity". The Boston Globe. Archived from the original on March 6, 2022 – via Newspapers.com.
- Le Marquand, Sarrah (April 12, 2006). "Woman in the Wing – Allison Janney reveals what makes life inside the White House so popular". The Daily Telegraph. ProQuest 359259567
- "How about that?". The Guardian. January 26, 2008. Archived from the original on December 30, 2017.
- Heisler, Steve (July 6, 2009). "The West Wing: "Lord John Marbury"/"He Shall, From Time To Time..."". The A.V. Club.
- Heisler, Steve (August 10, 2009). "The West Wing: "Lies, Damn Lies & Statistics"/"What Kind Of Day Has It Been"". The A.V. Club. Archived from the original on November 18, 2021.
- Dailey, Kate (September 6, 2011). "10 glass ceilings yet to be shattered". BBC News Magazine.
- Lyons, Margaret (June 22, 2012). "From Sports Night to Studio 60: Vulture Ranks Aaron Sorkin's TV Characters". vulture.com. Archived from the original on July 8, 2016.
- Thompson, Kelly (January 28, 2013). "She has no head! – why 'Young Avengers' is the future of superhero comics". Comic Book Resources. Archived from the original on December 29, 2021.
- Bullock, Maggie (January 14, 2014). "Allison Janney just keeps getting better". Elle. Archived from the original on April 27, 2017.
- O'Connell, Mikey; Bernardin, Marc; Rose, Lacey (May 13, 2014). "'West Wing' Uncensored: Aaron Sorkin, Rob Lowe, more look back on early fears, long hours, contract battles and the real reason for those departures". The Hollywood Reporter. Archived from the original on October 5, 2021.
- Sandberg, Bryn (May 13, 2014). "'The West Wing' cast reflects on favorite episodes". The Hollywood Reporter. Archived from the original on February 16, 2022.
- Travers, Ben; Miller, Liz Shannon; Gupta, Shipra (July 4, 2014). "15(ish) episodes of 'The West Wing' to binge view in celebration of america". IndieWire. Archived from the original on October 6, 2021.
- O'Keeffe, Joe; Reid, David; Sims, Kevin (September 12, 2014). "A definitive ranking of every character on 'The West Wing'". The Atlantic. Archived from the original on March 1, 2021.
- Rosenberg, Alyssa (September 23, 2014). "CCH Pounder takes her wonderful voice to 'NCIS: New Orleans'". The Washington Post. Archived from the original on January 6, 2016. "The Guyanese actress has an eclectic resume that includes her stint as Detective Claudette Wyms..."
- Harmanci, Reyhan (April 3, 2015). "The Florrick Effect: why power suits are back on TV". The Cut. Archived from the original on December 29, 2021.
- Lawler, Kelly (April 29, 2016). "C.J. Cregg (aka Allison Janney) crashed the White House press briefing". USA Today. Archived from the original on December 28, 2021.
- Knapp, JD (April 30, 2017). "Allison Janney brings 'West Wing' role to 'Not the White House Correspondents' Dinner'". Variety. Archived from the original on January 19, 2018.
- Dry, Jude (January 21, 2018). "Allison Janney wins SAG Award for Best Supporting Actress in a Film for 'I, Tonya'". IndieWire. Archived from the original on March 6, 2021.
- "West Wing star Allison Janney: I can't stand to watch White House briefings". Belfast Telegraph. February 16, 2018. Archived from the original on March 7, 2022.
- Vázquez, Anabel (October 5, 2020). "Vuelve C.J a 'El ala oeste de la Casa Blanca': así se convirtió Allison Janney en el icono televisivo de un tiempo". El País (in Spanish). Archived from the original on December 29, 2021.
- Harvey, Josephine (January 21, 2021). "New White House Press Secretary, Jen Psaki, A Hit On Twitter After First Briefing". The Huffington Post. Archived from the original on February 2, 2022.
- McNamara, Mary (January 21, 2021). "Please stop comparing Biden Press Secretary Jen Psaki to 'The West Wing's' C.J. Cregg". The Los Angeles Times. Archived from the original on February 2, 2022.
- AP Entertainment [@APEntertainment] (February 9, 2021). ".@AllisonBJanney says she's 'flattered' by comparisons of her 'The West Wing' character C.J. Cregg to new White House Press Secretary Jen Psaki: 'She's extraordinary.'" (Tweet) – via Twitter.
- Franks, Sarah (May 13, 2021). "Final 'Mom' episode tonight". The Journal News. Archived from the original on February 2, 2022 – via Newspapers.com.
- Vary, Adam B. (June 25, 2021). "How 'The West Wing' Cast and Crew Pulled Off Their Groundbreaking Reunion". Variety.
- McMenamin, Lexi (January 14, 2022). "Biden officials need to take their coronavirus messaging more seriously". Teen Vogue. Archived from the original on February 2, 2022.

=== Awards ===
- "52nd Primetime Emmys Nominees and Winners – Outstanding Supporting Actress in a Drama Series". Academy of Television Arts & Sciences. Archived from the original on August 13, 2015.
- "53rd Primetime Emmys Nominees and Winners – Outstanding Supporting Actress in a Drama Series". Academy of Television Arts & Sciences. Archived from the original on June 8, 2015.
- "54th Primetime Emmys Nominees and Winners – Outstanding Lead Actress in a Drama Series". Academy of Television Arts & Sciences. Archived from the original on May 19, 2015.
- "55th Primetime Emmys Nominees and Winners – Outstanding Lead Actress in a Drama Series". Academy of Television Arts & Sciences. Archived from the original on May 31, 2015.
- "56th Primetime Emmys Nominees and Winners – Outstanding Lead Actress in a Drama Series". Academy of Television Arts & Sciences. Archived from the original on May 24, 2015.
- "58th Primetime Emmys Nominees and Winners – Outstanding Lead Actress in a Drama Series". Academy of Television Arts & Sciences. Archived from the original on May 16, 2015.
- "Winners & Nominees 2001". Hollywood Foreign Press Association. Archived from the original on December 20, 2016.
- "Winners & Nominees 2002". Golden Globes. Hollywood Foreign Press Association. Archived from the original on December 20, 2016.
- "Winners & Nominees 2003". Golden Globes. Hollywood Foreign Press Association. Archived from the original on December 20, 2016.
- "Winners & Nominees 2004". Golden Globes. Hollywood Foreign Press Association. Archived from the original on December 20, 2016.
- "The 9th Annual Screen Actors Guild Awards". Screen Actors Guild Awards. Archived from the original on November 1, 2011.
- "The 10th Annual Screen Actors Guild Awards". Screen Actors Guild Awards. Archived from the original on September 20, 2016.
- "The 11th Annual Screen Actors Guild Awards". Screen Actors Guild Awards. Archived from the original on August 25, 2013.
- "The 12th Annual Screen Actors Guild Awards". Screen Actors Guild Awards. Archived from the original on September 30, 2011.

=== Books ===
- Levine, Myron A. (2003). "The West Wing (NBC) and The West Wing (D.C.): Myth and Reality in Television's Portrayal of the White House". In Rollins, Peter C. (ed.). The West Wing: The American Presidency as Television Drama. Syracuse University Press. ISBN 9780815651833.
- Waxman, Sharon (2003). "Inside The West Wing's New World". In Rollins, Peter C. (ed.). The West Wing: The American Presidency as Television Drama. Syracuse University Press. ISBN 9780815651833.
- Paxton, Nathan A. (2005). "Virtue from Vice: Duty, Power, and The West Wing". In Fahy, Thomas (ed.). Considering Aaron Sorkin: Essays on the Politics, Poetics and Sleight of Hand in the Films and Television Series. McFarland Press. ISBN 9780786421206.
- Garrett, Laura K. (2005). "Women of The West Wing: Gender Stereotypes in the Political Fiction". In Fahy, Thomas (ed.). Considering Aaron Sorkin: Essays on the Politics, Poetics and Sleight of Hand in the Films and Television Series. McFarland Press. ISBN 9780786421206.
- Crawley, Melissa (2006). Mr. Sorkin Goes to Washington: Shaping the President on Television's The West Wing. McFarland Press. ISBN 9780786424399.
- Parry-Giles, Shawn J. (2010). The Prime-Time Presidency: The West Wing and U.S. Nationalism. University of Illinois Press. ISBN 9780252092091.
- Webster, Patrick (2020). Windows into The West Wing. McFarland Press. ISBN 9781476639369.
