= John Spencer (actor) =

American actor (1946–2005)

- Born: John Speshock Jr. December 20, 1946; Paterson, New Jersey, U.S.
- Died: December 16, 2005 (aged 58); Los Angeles, California, U.S.
- Resting place: Totowa, New Jersey, U.S.
- Occupation: Actor
- Years active: 1963–2005
- Television: Tommy Mullaney in L.A. Law; Leo McGarry on The West Wing

John Spencer (born John Speshock Jr.; December 20, 1946 – December 16, 2005) was an American actor. He was best known for his role as Leo McGarry on the NBC political drama series The West Wing (1999–2006) and for his role as attorney Tommy Mullaney in NBC legal drama series L.A. Law (1990–1994). His performance on The West Wing earned him a Primetime Emmy Award in 2002, out of five total nominations.

== Early life and education ==
John Spencer was born John Speshock Jr., on December 20, 1946, in Paterson, New Jersey, and was raised in Totowa, New Jersey. He was the son of blue-collar parents Mildred (née Benzeroski), a rug finisher and waitress, and John Michael Speshock, a plastic moulder, truck driver, and later, a construction contractor. Spencer's father was of Slovak descent, while his mother was of Ukrainian and Rusyn ancestry. Spencer’s parents were disappointed when he chose to become an actor. With his enrollment at the Professional Children's School in Manhattan in 1963, Spencer found himself sharing classes with such fellow students as Liza Minnelli and violinist Pinchas Zukerman. He attended Fairleigh Dickinson University, but did not complete a degree. Spencer often referred to himself as a "dyed-in-the-wool liberal" and described Franklin Delano Roosevelt as one of his heroes.

== Career ==
Spencer began his television career on The Patty Duke Show, and eventually began appearing in supporting roles in feature films beginning with 1983's WarGames. He won an Obie Award for the 1981 off Broadway production of Still Life, about a Vietnam War veteran, and received a Drama Desk nomination for The Day Room. In 1986 he appeared on Broadway as Dan White, the killer of Harvey Milk, in Execution of Justice, alongside Stanley Tucci and Wesley Snipes. Spencer was a supporting actor in the hit 1990 courtroom thriller Presumed Innocent, portraying a tough veteran detective, starring opposite Harrison Ford. In Law & Order Episode "Prescription for Death", he played Howard Morton the father of Suzanne Morton. Spencer's work also extended to video games, portraying the role of Captain Hugh Paulsen in the 1995 video game Wing Commander IV: The Price of Freedom. Spencer's subsequent film and television work primarily consisted of supporting roles such as a colleague and friend to Billy Crystal's basketball referee in Forget Paris and a prickly FBI Director in Michael Bay's film The Rock.

=== L.A. Law ===
In 1990, Spencer joined the cast of the television series L.A. Law, playing street-wise attorney Tommy Mullaney from 1990 to 1994. Spencer originally was not going to take the role but after reading five pages of the script he was convinced and said "it was one of the best scripts I'd read". Spencer said the character's disheveled wardrobe was based on his own. Spencer said he and co-star Cecil Hoffman spent time in New York City to prepare for the role.

=== The West Wing ===
In 1999, Spencer was cast as Leo McGarry on the NBC political drama series The West Wing. McGarry was White House Chief of Staff to the fictional U.S. President Jed Bartlet. He was a recovering alcoholic, a compulsive worker, and a former U.S. Air Force pilot during the Vietnam War. Spencer's role on the show earned him the Primetime Emmy Award for Outstanding Supporting Actor in a Drama Series in 2002, for the show's third season episodes "Bartlet for America" and "We Killed Yamamoto."

== Personal life ==
Spencer was married once and was divorced in the 1970s; he had no children. He quit drinking in 1989 after over 20 years of addiction to alcohol. He gave up smoking in 1999.

== Death ==
On December 16, 2005, Spencer died at Olympia Medical Center in Los Angeles at the age of 58, after suffering a heart attack the night before. Many of Spencer's former co-stars and collaborators paid tribute to him at his funeral, including Martin Sheen, Dulé Hill, Joshua Malina, Janel Moloney, Richard Schiff, Alan Alda, Jimmy Smits, Aaron Sorkin, Allison Janney, James Mangold, David E. Kelley, and Bradley Whitford. Kristin Chenoweth sang the musical number "For Good" from the Winnie Holzman and Stephen Schwartz Wizard of Oz musical Wicked. Spencer's remains were interred at Laurel Grove Memorial Park in his hometown of Totowa, New Jersey.

At the time of his death, Spencer had filmed two episodes of The West Wing’s seventh and final season that were in post-production – "Running Mates" and "The Cold" (Episodes 10 and 13, respectively). In both episodes, McGarry was portrayed as a candidate for vice president. The show's writers decided to adapt Spencer's absence by saying that McGarry died of a heart attack on election night; the character had already suffered a near-fatal heart attack in the show's sixth season. Spencer's name remained in the show's opening credits of each remaining episode aired in the months after his death.

== Filmography ==
=== Film ===
Year	Title	Role	Notes
1982	Echoes	Stephen	
1983	WarGames	Air Force Captain Jerry	
1985	The Protector	Ko's Pilot	
1985	Key Exchange	Record Executive	
1987	The Verne Miller Story	George Sally	
1987	Hiding Out	Bakey	
1989	Far from Home	TV Preacher	
1989	Sea of Love	Lieutenant	
1989	Black Rain	Captain Oliver	
1989	Simple Justice	Detective Phil Sullivan	
1990	Presumed Innocent	Detective Lipranzer	
1990	Green Card	Harry	
1992	In the Arms of a Killer	Detective Cusack	TV movie
1992	When No One Would Listen	Walter Wheeler	
1995	Forget Paris	Jack	
1995	Cafe Society	Ray Davioni	
1996	The Rock	FBI Director James Womack	
1996	Albino Alligator	Jack	
1997	Cold Around the Heart	Uncle Mike	
1997	Cop Land	Detective Leo Crasky	
1998	Lesser Prophets	Ed	
1998	Twilight	Captain Phil Egan	
1998	OK Garage	Bill Gunter	
1998	The Negotiator	Police Chief Al Travis	
1999	Ravenous	General Slauson	

=== Television ===
Year	Title	Role	Notes
1963–1964	The Patty Duke Show	Henry	7 episodes
1976	Ryan's Hope	Orderly	2 episodes
1986	Miami Vice	Lieutenant Lee Atkins	Episode: "The Good Collar"
1986	Spenser: For Hire	Joe Moran	Episode: "Home Is the Hero"
1987	One Life to Live	Evan Sutton	1 episode
1987–1988	Another World	Frank Julian	Unknown episodes
1988	As the World Turns	Don West	Unknown episodes
1990	Law & Order	Howard Morton	Episode: "Prescription for Death"
1990–1994	L.A. Law	Tommy Mullaney	71 episodes
1994	Duckman	Agent Dennehy	Episode: "Not So Easy Riders"
1995	Touched by an Angel	Leo	Episode: "The Driver"
1996	F/X: The Series	Carl Scofield	Episode: "High Risk"
1997	Lois & Clark: The New Adventures of Superman	Hank Landry / Mr. Gadget	Episode: "Lethal Weapon"
1997	Tracey Takes On...	Ray Weggerly	Episode: "Crime"
1997	Early Edition	Howard Banner	Episode: "Jenny Sloane"
1998	Trinity	Simon McAllister	3 episodes
1999–2006	The West Wing	Leo McGarry	135 episodes Primetime Emmy Award for Outstanding Supporting Actor in a Drama Series (2002); Screen Actors Guild Award for Outstanding Performance by an Ensemble in a Drama Series (2000, 2001); Viewers for Quality Television Award for Best Supporting Actor in a Quality Drama Series; Nominated—Golden Globe Award for Best Supporting Actor – Series, Miniseries or Television Film; Nominated—Primetime Emmy Award for Outstanding Supporting Actor in a Drama Series (2000–01, 2003–04); Nominated—Screen Actors Guild Award for Outstanding Performance by an Ensemble in a Drama Series (2002–05) (final appearance)
1999	The Outer Limits	Colonel Wallis Thurman	Episode: "Summit"
1999	L.A. Doctors	Dr. Edmund Church	Episode: "The Life Lost in Living"

=== Video games ===
Year	Title	Role	Notes
1996	Wing Commander IV: The Price of Freedom	Captain Hugh Paulsen	

== Awards ==
Year	Nominee / work	Award	Result
1981	Still Life	Obie Award	Won
2000	The West Wing	Viewers for Quality Television Award for Best Supporting Actor in a Quality Drama Series	Won
2000	The West Wing	Primetime Emmy Award for Outstanding Supporting Actor in a Drama Series	Nominated
2000	The West Wing	Screen Actors Guild Award for Outstanding Performance by an Ensemble in a Drama Series	Won
2001	The West Wing	Primetime Emmy Award for Outstanding Supporting Actor in a Drama Series	Nominated
2001	The West Wing	Screen Actors Guild Award for Outstanding Performance by an Ensemble in a Drama Series	Won
2002	The West Wing	Primetime Emmy Award for Outstanding Supporting Actor in a Drama Series	Won
2002	The West Wing	Screen Actors Guild Award for Outstanding Performance by an Ensemble in a Drama Series	Nominated
2002	The West Wing	Golden Globe Award for Best Supporting Actor – Series, Miniseries or Television Film	Nominated
2003	The West Wing	Primetime Emmy Award for Outstanding Supporting Actor in a Drama Series	Nominated
2003	The West Wing	Screen Actors Guild Award for Outstanding Performance by an Ensemble in a Drama Series	Nominated
2004	The West Wing	Primetime Emmy Award for Outstanding Supporting Actor in a Drama Series	Nominated
2004	The West Wing	Screen Actors Guild Award for Outstanding Performance by an Ensemble in a Drama Series	Nominated
2005	The West Wing	Screen Actors Guild Award for Outstanding Performance by an Ensemble in a Drama Series	Nominated
