= Forrest Sawyer =

American journalist and broadcaster

- Born: April 19, 1949 (age 77); Lakeland, Florida, U.S.
- Education: B.A. in Eastern Philosophy and World Religion and M.A. in Education, University of Florida
- Occupations: WAGA-TV news anchor (1980–1985); CBS Morning News anchor (1985–1987); ABC News and NBC News anchor
- Years active: 1980–2011

Forrest Sawyer (born April 19, 1949) is an American journalist and former network news anchor and correspondent. Sawyer anchored CBS Morning News and spent 12 years at ABC News, where he frequently anchored the flagship broadcasts ABC World News Tonight and Nightline and reported for all ABC News broadcasts. He anchored the primetime newsmagazines "Day One" and "Turning Point". Sawyer reported stories from all over the globe, earning eight Emmy awards as well as a Peabody, and an Edward R. Murrow. He is perhaps best known for his coverage of first Gulf War. ABC President Roone Arledge wrote in his memoir that Sawyer's coverage of the invasion of Kuwait "made him a star." Sawyer left ABC News in 1999 to become a news anchor for both NBC and its cable counterpart, MSNBC, where he played a role in the 2000 Presidential campaign and 9/11 coverage and produced and hosted documentaries. He was a regular substitute for Brian Williams as anchor for The News with Brian Williams. He left NBC News in 2005 to become founder and president of Freefall Productions, where he produces documentaries and serves as a media strategist and guest lecturer.

== Early years ==
Sawyer was born and raised in Lakeland, Florida, where he graduated from Kathleen High School. As a senior, he launched a 30-minute weekly radio program on local commercial station WONN. The program featured news, music, and satirical skits. He was a member of Alpha Tau Omega at the University of Florida, where he earned a Bachelor's degree in Eastern Philosophy and World Religions and a Master's degree in Education. Sawyer helped pay college expenses working at local Gainesville radio stations as a disc jockey and reporting news.

== Professional career ==
Forrest Sawyer joined Georgia's WGST radio in Atlanta in 1977 when it began an all-news format. He created an innovative newsmagazine, "WGST Midday,” from 10-2, which featured eight live interviews a day with scientists, national civic leaders, celebrities, and thousands more from across the country. The program quadrupled ratings for the daypart and received numerous awards, including two American Psychological Association Awards.

In 1980 Sawyer began working for Atlanta CBS affiliate WAGA where he co-anchored 6 and 11 PM news programs with Pam Martin. Sawyer's investigative reports tracked Colombia's drug cartels as they moved cocaine from Colombia into Cuba and the Bahamas and throughout the Southeastern United States. His criminal investigation of former Labor Commissioner Sam Caldwell helped lead to a conviction of mail and insurance fraud. Caldwell was sentenced to 30 months in Federal prison. Both WAGA's 6 and 11pm news programs rose to #1 in Atlanta ratings for the first time in station history.

He shared a Peabody Award in 1982 for Paradise Saved, a documentary on Georgia's Cumberland Island. Sawyer, Don Smith, and photographer George Gentry were cited for a program in which viewers were "treated to a quality of visual beauty not often seen on television and, at the same time, were informed, enlightened, and challenged concerning the problems of retaining a great natural heritage and a diminishing resource—the unspoiled beauty of the Atlantic Coast."

He transitioned to national news in 1985, anchoring The Early Show and was later a foreign correspondent. He covered the historic Reagan-Gorbechev summits in Geneva and Reykjavik. He joined ABC in 1988 as anchorman of ABC World News This Morning and also hosted "World News Sunday" and "Day One." Sawyer filed the first in-depth network report on the 1996 Mount Everest disaster.

For ABC's broadcast "They Were Young and Brave", Sawyer returned to the Ia Drang Valley in Vietnam with veterans of the first and fiercest battle of the Vietnam War. Lieutenant Colonel Hal Moore and men from his battalion met survivors from the enemy side. It was the first time in history US soldiers returned to the battlefield and met with their former opponents. The documentary was based on the book We Were Soldiers Once...and Brave by Moore and Joseph Galloway.

Sawyer anchored live special coverage the Oklahoma City bombing, the Death of Diana, Princess of Wales, and the 1989 Loma Prieta earthquake.

Sawyer filed the first live television report from a battlefield during the first Gulf War. He also served as a regular substitute anchor on the ABC News programs ABC World News Tonight and Nightline before leaving ABC and joining NBC. Sawyer hosted numerous programs on the Discovery Channel in the early 1990s including "Serial Killer," Shark Week, and a year-long investigation into violence in America. Sawyer reported on the 1999 air war against Yugoslavia, reporting for both ABC and Discovery. He and his team won an Emmy for their coverage of a helicopter crash in 1999.

In addition to his Peabody Award, he has received a total of eight National Emmy Awards, two Sigma Delta Chi Awards, an Edward R. Murrow Award, an Associated Press Award, an Ohio State Award, an Ark Award and two American Psychological Association Awards.

In the first ever live broadcast of The West Wing, Sawyer played himself as moderator in "The Debate." The episode in the show's seventh season was a live debate between presidential candidates played by Alan Alda and Jimmy Smits. The Debate received the season's highest ratings.

He has been a keynote speaker at numerous events, including the American Association of Community Colleges Conference in Long Beach, CA, and the University of California, Santa Barbara, conference titled, "The Future of Multi-Media Digital News and Cultural Networks."

In late 2007, while filming a documentary in Tanzania, Sawyer survived a helicopter crash in which he suffered a serious knee injury before hiking miles with other survivors to safety. His media appearances include anchoring the July 19, 2008 edition of the CBS Evening News. and reporting the 2009 Frontline documentary "Ten Trillion and Counting," a journey through the politics behind the national debt.

Sawyer has appeared in numerous films, playing himself in The Manchurian Candidate and Sharky's Machine, and portraying an archeologist in For Sale by Owner.
