= Eli Attie =

American writer and producer

- Education: Harvard College
- Occupations: Writer, producer, former White House staffer
- Parents: David Attie (father); Dotty Attie (mother)
- Awards: Emmy Award; Peabody Award

Eli Attie is an Emmy-winning writer, producer, and former White House staff member. He served as Vice President Al Gore's chief White House and campaign speechwriter through Gore's concession of the 2000 presidential election, which Attie and Gore wrote together. Attie then became a longtime writer-producer on TV drama series including The West Wing, House, The Diplomat, and The Pitt, on which he is currently an executive producer.

== Early life and education ==
Attie grew up in New York City. His mother is acclaimed feminist painter Dotty Attie, his father was commercial and fine art photographer David Attie (whose archive he has helped to revive), and his brother is the widely published mathematician Oliver Attie. He is a graduate of Hunter College High School and of Harvard College, where he was an editor of The Harvard Crimson.

== Career ==
=== Political work ===
Attie began his career in Democratic politics and government. He was chief White House and campaign speechwriter for Vice President Al Gore through the Florida recount in 2000. It was Attie who broke the news to Gore on election night – as he was about to deliver a concession speech Attie had written – that he was suddenly only 600 votes behind George W. Bush in Florida, and that the election might not be over.

=== Television ===
After working in the real White House and on the campaign trail, Attie became a writer and producer on the NBC-TV series The West Wing for the last five of the show's seven seasons -- the only writer to work on the show full-time for five full seasons. Series creator Aaron Sorkin has written that Attie "made a big impact immediately," and said at a 2024 celebration of the series at the White House, "if you have a favorite moment from the show, chances are Eli had something to do with it." A number of the show's key storylines came from Attie's own experiences in politics. In addition, according to David Remnick's biography of Barack Obama, The Bridge: The Life and Rise of Barack Obama, and other news sources, Attie used then-State Senator Obama as a model for the character of Matt Santos, a presidential candidate played by actor Jimmy Smits in the final two seasons of the show. Attie was nominated for Writers Guild and Humanitas awards for the episode "Election Day: Part 2", in which Santos wins the presidency. In 2020, Attie collaborated with Sorkin on new material for the show's HBO Max reunion special, A West Wing Special to Benefit When We All Vote.

Attie was a writer and co-executive producer on House for the last five of its eight seasons, and was nominated for a Humanitas award for the series finale, "Everybody Dies", which he co-wrote with series creator David Shore. He makes an uncredited appearance in the episode as well.

Attie's more recent television credits include several seasons as a writer and producer on Showtime's Wall Street drama Billions -- he makes a brief appearance as a presidential aide in its series finale -- as well as on Netflix's political thriller The Diplomat, on the streamer's limited series Zero Day, which starred Robert De Niro, and most recently on The Pitt, which he joined for its third season.

=== Other work ===
In addition to his work in television, Attie's screenplay "Smile Relax Attack" was included on the Black List, an industry list of executives' most-liked scripts, and he has done numerous uncredited movie rewrites.

He has also been a guest on political consultant David Axelrod's podcast "The Axe Files", and on Aimee Mann and Ted Leo's podcast "The Art of Process". Attie was a frequent guest on "The West Wing Weekly", a podcast that ran episode-by-episode through the entire series of The West Wing.

Attie has worked as a rock critic for The Washington Post, Slate, and other publications. He wrote the liner notes for Nick Lowe's 2024 album Indoor Safari.

Attie is on the board of Let America Vote, a non-profit founded by Jason Kander that fights voter suppression.

== Awards ==
Attie is an eight-time Emmy nominee and a six-time WGA award nominee; he won an Emmy Award for "The West Wing Documentary Special" and a Peabody Award for co-writing the September 11 special America: A Tribute to Heroes. He won ASCAP's Deems-Taylor award for pop music writing.
