= Jed Bartlet =

Fictional American President

Josiah Bartlet
- The West Wing character
- Martin Sheen as President Josiah Bartlet
- First appearance: "Pilot" (episode 1.01)
- Last appearance: "Tomorrow" (episode 7.22)
- Created by: Aaron Sorkin
- Portrayed by: Martin Sheen; Jason Widener (flashbacks); Emilio Estevez (flashbacks)

In-universe information
- Full name: Josiah Edward Bartlet
- Nicknames: Jed; Liberty, Eagle and Potus (Secret Service code names)
- Occupation: President of the United States (1999–2007; two terms); Pre-series; Governor of New Hampshire (1991–1999; four terms); U.S. Representative for New Hampshire's 1st district (1985–1991; three terms); Member of the New Hampshire House of Representatives (1971–1985; seven terms); Professor emeritus at Dartmouth College; Economist
- Affiliation: Democratic
- Family: Dr Bartlet (father); Mrs Bartlet (mother); Jonathan Bartlet (brother); Annie Bartlet Westin (granddaughter); Gus Bartlet Westin (grandson); Unnamed Faison (grandchild)
- Spouse: Dr Abigail "Abbey" Bartlet
- Children: Elizabeth Bartlet Westin; Eleanor Bartlet Faison; Zoey Bartlet
- Relatives: Doug Westin (son-in-law, via Elizabeth); Victor Faison (son-in-law, via Eleanor); Josiah Bartlett (real-life ancestor)
- Religion: Roman Catholic
- Home: Manchester, New Hampshire
- Nationality: American
- Alma mater: University of Notre Dame (B.A.); London School of Economics (M.Sc., Ph.D.)
- Awards: Nobel Memorial Prize in Economic Sciences; Honorary Doctorate in Humane Letters from Dartmouth College

Josiah Edward "Jed" Bartlet is a fictional character from the American television serial drama The West Wing created by Aaron Sorkin and portrayed by actor Martin Sheen. The role earned Sheen the Golden Globe Award for Best Actor – Television Series Drama, as well as two Actor Awards for Outstanding Performance by a Male Actor in a Drama Series.

Bartlet's tenure as a fictional Democratic President of the United States is a preeminent aspect of the series. His origin as a recurring character evolved due to Sheen's acting finesse; Sorkin and fellow West Wing writers shaped Bartlet's role within the show accordingly. The first season depicts part of Bartlet's first two years in the White House. The remainder of the series fleshes out the details of Bartlet's administration, including friction between his policies and those of the Republican-dominated Congress, his tribulations with multiple sclerosis, his reelection, and the campaign of his successor, Matt Santos. Bartlet is characterized by manifest integrity, quick witticisms, a fierce intellect, and compassionate stoicism.

== Creation and development ==
Show creator Aaron Sorkin had not initially intended to feature the president at all. He envisioned the series as focused on the White House senior staff who execute and advise on major policy and political matters. "Then I felt that would become hokey," he said. "We'll constantly be just missing the president. As he walks around the corner, we'll see the back of his head." The character of Josiah Bartlet was then created as a recurring figure, and Martin Sheen was signed to appear in four episodes. Alan Alda (who went on to portray Senator Arnold Vinick), Jason Robards, and Sidney Poitier were also considered for the role. After seeing Sheen's dailies, the producers were so impressed that they asked him to join the regular cast. "They realized that people might catch on that I'd be there only once a month, so they talked to me about a longer commitment," says Sheen. The actor said that part of the reason he took on the role of Bartlet was his involvement in social issues.

Sorkin's main interest in writing for the character was exploring the side of the president that the public does not generally see. Sheen described the character as being drawn largely from Bill Clinton: "He's bright, astute, and filled with all the negative foibles that make him very human," he told Radio Times. Sheen said elsewhere that he adored Clinton and was welcomed into the Clinton White House for visits during the period between the show's beginning in the fall of 1999 and the inauguration of George W. Bush as president in January 2001. Sorkin said he took some of Bartlet's characteristics from his own father, namely his "great love of education and literature [and] all things old," his "[belief] in a genuine goodness in people," and his "'Aw, Dad' sense of humor."

In the middle of the show's first season, it is revealed that Bartlet has multiple sclerosis. According to Sorkin, this was not planned; the plot came about because he wanted to write an episode in which the president was in bed watching a soap opera and the audience discovered that the first lady was a physician. "When I wrote the pilot, I didn't have any idea what was going to happen in Episode 2, much less 12," he says.

== Character biography ==
=== Personal life ===
Bartlet was born in 1942 and raised in Manchester, New Hampshire. He is a descendant of Dr. Josiah Bartlett, a real-world signatory of the Declaration of Independence.

Bartlet is a devout Roman Catholic. This is due to the influence of his mother, as his father would have preferred that he be raised Protestant. His relationship with his father was often strained from parental abuse. In a discussion with his subconscious, personified by the "ghost" of Mrs Landingham, his father is described as "a prick who could never get over the fact that he wasn't as smart as his brothers". Sorkin has stated that Bartlet's father, "obviously convinced he married some Catholic whore, treats his son terribly for a number of reasons, not the least of which is that he adopted his mother's religion." Sorkin said that Bartlet's tirade against God in the episode "Two Cathedrals" is therefore directed just as much at Bartlet's own father as it is at God. However, when his father's unkind and sometimes abusive treatment of him is mentioned by Toby Ziegler, Bartlet attempts to defend his father. Though he is long dead, Toby suggests that Bartlet is still trying to get the man to like him, hoping that "maybe if you get enough votes, win one more election," Bartlet will finally be able to earn his father's approval.

He displays a remarkable ability for chess. Once, he engaged several members of his staff in separate matches at the same time and won.

Bartlet scored 1590 out of 1600 on his SAT college admission test. Later he retook the exam, and received the same result, something both Leo McGarry and Dr Stanley Keyworth find amusing. He was accepted to Williams, Harvard, and Yale, but instead chose to go to the University of Notre Dame, as he was considering becoming a priest, though decided against it after meeting Abbey, his future wife. He graduated summa cum laude with a B.A. in American studies and a minor in theology. He received a Master's and a Ph.D. in economics from the London School of Economics, as well as an Honorary Doctorate in Humane Letters from Dartmouth College, where he was a tenured professor prior to entering politics. He speaks four languages, including Latin, English, and German. He is a Nobel Laureate in Economics, and is generally portrayed as a macroeconomist sympathetic to Keynesian views. He was required to split his Nobel Prize with another economist, a much more conservative Japanese man whom Bartlet respects but does not particularly like. He is the author of a book entitled Theory and Practice of Macroeconomics in Developing Countries, and his research in economics is described as being focused on the developing world.

Bartlet's wife, Abigail Bartlet, is a thoracic surgeon and they have three daughters: Elizabeth Anne Westin, Eleanor Emily Bartlet, and Zoey Patricia Bartlet. There are two grandchildren from his oldest daughter, Elizabeth: Annie, who is 12 in the pilot (although she is shown as and is referenced as being much younger in later episodes), and Gus, who is about 5 in the fifth season. It is also revealed in the seventh season that middle daughter Ellie is pregnant with Bartlet's third grandchild. He is depicted as a stern but very loving and indulgent father, in contrast to his own father, who (as is seen in flashbacks) was cold and physically abusive. President Bartlet also has paternal feelings towards members of his staff, referring to Charlie Young (his personal aide, with whom he is especially close, denoted by the gift of the Bartlet family carving knife made by Paul Revere) and Josh Lyman (his deputy chief of staff) as his sons, and telling C.J. Cregg (his press secretary and later chief of staff) that she is part of his family.

Bartlet has relapsing-remitting multiple sclerosis, which at one time puts the future of his presidency in doubt. He and his wife concealed his illness during his initial presidential run and would not disclose the information until well into his first term, leading to allegations of fraud. He receives a Congressional censure for covering up his MS while running for president.

Bartlet began his political career when he was elected to the New Hampshire House of Representatives. He later served three terms in the United States House of Representatives, representing New Hampshire's 1st congressional district. Like his ancestor, Jed Bartlet served as Governor of New Hampshire, and he won re-election to his final term with 69% of the vote.

A recurring motif throughout the series is Bartlet's inability to remember the names of junior staffers, a trait taken directly from Sheen's own memory tendencies. However, in the series finale episode, he meets and thanks a long series of White House staff members and addresses them all accurately by name. Bartlet also displays an obsession with trivia, often quizzing family, friends, and staff, whether they are interested or not — generally not.

=== Presidency ===
Bartlet's best friend, Leo McGarry, persuades him to run for president around the fall of 1997, writing the slogan "Bartlet for America" on a cocktail napkin. Although initially a dark horse, Bartlet eventually defeats the Democratic frontrunner, U.S. Senator John Hoynes of Texas, whom Bartlet asks to join the ticket as his vice-presidential running mate. He defeats the Republican nominee for president, winning a close election with just 48% of the vote, 48 million popular votes, and a 303–235 margin in the Electoral College. He is sworn into his first term on January 20, 1999.

Bartlet's accomplishments as president include appointing the first Hispanic Supreme Court Justice and first female Chief Justice, negotiating a peace settlement between Israel and Palestine, creating millions of new jobs, providing strong support for alternative energy, and orchestrating a Social Security reform plan (although it is never made clear whether the plan is passed by the United States Congress, the show indicates that a revolutionary agreement is achieved with bi-partisan support). He does, however, express regret at his inability to balance the budget in his eight years in the White House.

Bartlet does not shy away from using the military when he feels it is necessary during his eight years in the White House, and deals with major foreign policy crises in various parts of the world. The Middle East is a recurring source of problems, particularly Iran, Syria, the Israeli–Palestinian conflict and the fictional gulf state of Qumar. Bartlet is able to solve the Israeli-Palestinian conflict by negotiating a historic agreement at Camp David in 2005 and deploying peacekeepers to the region, despite opposition to these efforts from both Democrats and Republicans. Terrorism, particularly from the Bahji network based in Qumar, is a continual problem and in the season 4 finale, Bartlet has to confront the kidnapping of his own daughter at the hands of the group. In Latin America, Bartlet has to deal with situations in Haiti, Colombia and Bolivia. A conflict and genocide in the fictional African nation of Equatorial Kundu lead Bartlet to intervene militarily and declare a bold interventionist foreign policy doctrine. In Asia, Bartlet deals with tensions and near-conflicts between India and Pakistan, China and Taiwan, and Russia and China. The latter crisis, in his final year, leads to him deploying 140,000 peacekeepers to prevent a full-blown conflict over oil in Kazakhstan, and this becomes a key issue in the 2006 presidential campaign to succeed him.

President Bartlet shows the most affection among his staffers to Josh Lyman, C.J. Cregg, and Sam Seaborn. He predicts that Sam will one day run for president and expresses his faith in Sam's capability. While he clearly respects Toby Ziegler, the two are prone to clash, usually when Toby feels the President is not acting according to his true morality or is ducking important issues. He is pained when he finds out Toby has leaked classified national security information and fires him. Bartlet eventually signs a pardon for Toby in his last official act as president. He does not get along well with either of his vice presidents, John Hoynes or Bob Russell, saying at one point he does not know what either of them is good for. For reasons presumably tied to his own lack of military service, he is somewhat intimidated by acid-tongued Secretary of Defense Miles Hutchinson and deferential to respected Chairman of the Joint Chiefs of Staff Percy Fitzwallace.

Bartlet is shot in the first season cliffhanger finale "What Kind of Day Has It Been". While it is revealed in the season 2 opening episode that his wounds are not serious (quick medical intervention having him on his feet within a few hours), Josh Lyman is critically injured. It is eventually discovered that the shooters were white supremacists from West Virginia and that his bodyman Charlie Young was the intended target of the assassination attempt, not Bartlet himself.

In the second-season finale, "Two Cathedrals", Bartlet announces to the country that he has multiple sclerosis, and has been keeping it a secret, although this had previously been revealed to the show's audience in the first-season episode "He Shall, from Time to Time..." This leads to an investigation of Bartlet's administration by a special prosecutor and by the United States House of Representatives, a storyline which dominates much of the show's third season. Eventually, Bartlet accepts a censure from Congress, which settles all investigations against him. While Bartlet's campaign efforts are damaged by the controversy, he nonetheless defeats the Republican nominee, Governor Robert Ritchie of Florida, by a landslide and is returned for a second term. The election is forecast to be close until Bartlet scores a decisive debate win over Ritchie.

Zoey Bartlet is kidnapped on the day of her graduation from Georgetown University, possibly in retaliation for the assassination of the Qumari defence minister, Abdul ibn Shareef, which her father authorized. While Zoey is missing, President Bartlet fears he is incapable of maintaining the necessary dispassion while his daughter is in such danger and invokes Section 3 of the Twenty-fifth Amendment to the United States Constitution, declaring himself incapacitated and transferring the powers of the presidency to the next person in the presidential line of succession. Due to the resignation a few days earlier of Vice President Hoynes, the Speaker of the House, Republican Glen Allen Walken, becomes Acting President of the United States. Zoey recovers with only minor injuries several days later and President Bartlet reassumes his office shortly thereafter.

Soon after Bartlet resumes the presidency, he faces off against Jeff Haffley, the newly elected Speaker of the House (replacing Walken, who was forced to resign in order to fulfil his duties as acting president) on intense budget negotiations that break down to the point where the federal government is shut down (similar to the real world 1995 and 1996 shutdowns during the Clinton administration). Eventually, Bartlet topples Haffley's influence and sees to it that the Speaker's power declines thereafter.

At the end of the fifth season and the beginning of the sixth, the Bartlet administration is dragged into the Israeli-Arab dispute after terrorists attack U.S. government officials on a trip to Gaza. Eventually, after intense negotiations at Camp David between the Israelis and the Palestinians, Bartlet manages to secure a peace agreement but at a great cost, firing his chief of staff Leo McGarry in a disagreement over the conflict. McGarry has a heart attack but later returns to work as Special Counsellor to the President. CJ Cregg succeeds him as chief of staff.

On a trip to China, Bartlet is left temporarily paralyzed by an attack of multiple sclerosis. As a result, he briefly uses a wheelchair but soon recovers although he is left somewhat weakened by the attack. After seeing Congressman Matt Santos' stirring speech at the Democratic National Convention, Bartlet has a chat with a New York Democratic leader who had previously refused to support Santos due to concerns over education policy; the leader reverses his course and Santos becomes the Democratic nominee for president.

In the seventh and final season of The West Wing, Bartlet is in the last year of his term as president. Near the end of the season, Congressman Matt Santos of Texas defeats the Republican nominee, Senator Arnold Vinick of California, in the 2006 presidential election and thereby becomes Bartlet's successor. After Santos' inauguration, Bartlet returns to his New Hampshire home aboard Air Force One with his wife and while en route has the last word of the series. Mrs Bartlet asks the introspective former president what he is thinking about, and Bartlet replies: "Tomorrow."

The Bartlet Presidential Library opens three years after the end of his term and Bartlet is present at the opening ceremony, along with Kate Harper, C. J. Cregg, Danny Concannon, Charlie Young, Toby Ziegler, Josh Lyman, and Will Bailey. The new president does not appear, as this scene occurs in a flash forward during season seven, before the election.

West Wing creator Aaron Sorkin briefly revived the character for Maureen Dowd's September 20, 2008 New York Times column, where he scripted a hypothetical meeting between Bartlet and then-Democratic presidential nominee Barack Obama. He did the same after Obama's first debate against Mitt Romney in 2012.

== Reception ==
The West Wing's portrayal of multiple sclerosis through Bartlet was applauded by Mike Dugan, president of the National Multiple Sclerosis Society. Dugan stated that the group was especially pleased that the affected character was a world leader, that the show educated viewers about MS and made it clear the disease is not fatal, and that Bartlet was shown as taking advantage of medical breakthroughs to treat his condition. "Since fiction often becomes more real to people than fact, President Bartlet's life with MS has the potential for great good," he said, suggesting that as Bartlet was able to overcome the challenges of his disease to succeed, "the public will become more accepting of individuals with MS and individuals with MS will become more accepting of themselves and their abilities to lead fulfilling lives."

Mike McCurry, a former press secretary for the Clinton administration, described Bartlet as the ideal president, possessing "the compassion and integrity of Jimmy Carter... that shrewd decision-making and hard-nosed realism of a Richard Nixon... the warmth and amiability and the throw-the-arm-around-the-shoulder of a Bill Clinton; and... the liberal passion of a Teddy Kennedy." James Poniewozik described the character in 2002 as "a folksy Nobel laureate with touches of F.D.R., Stephen Hawking, Will Rogers and the Buddha."

At one point, the producers of The X-Files considered having Sheen portray Bartlet in the final episode of the show, in a scene where he would be informed by members of The Syndicate that Fox Mulder escaped from government custody. Instead, Bartlet was replaced by an actor playing George W. Bush, although the scene was cut from the final episode altogether.

A Wall Street Journal poll in 2016 named Martin Sheen's Josiah Bartlet as the second greatest fictional president, behind Harrison Ford's President James Marshall in Air Force One.

== See also ==
- List of characters on The West Wing
- List of The West Wing episodes
