= BMR =

BMR may refer to:

== Arts and entertainment ==
- Bad Moon Rising (disambiguation), various works
- Big Machine Records, an American country music label
- Big Money Rustlas, a 2010 comedy film
- British Music Rights, a subsidiary of UK Music

== Science and technology ==
- Bare-metal restore, in data recovery
- Basal metabolic rate, daily energy expenditure at rest
- Bayesian model reduction, a statistical method
- Bureau of Mineral Resources, Geology and Geophysics, Australia
- Balanced Mode Radiator, a hybrid distributed mode loudspeaker

== Transport ==
- Brecon Mountain Railway, Wales
- Buffalo Metro Rail, New York
- Pegaso BMR, an armoured personnel carrier

== Other uses ==
- BMR Group, a Canadian chain of hardware stores
- Bill McAnally Racing, a NASCAR motorsport team
- Bangkok Metropolitan Region, Thailand
