= DML =

DML may refer to:

- Demonstrated Master Logistician, a certification bestowed by the International Society of Logistics (SOLE)
- Data manipulation language, a family of computer languages used by computer programs or database users to retrieve, insert, delete and update data in a database
- Devonport Management Limited, owner of Her Majesty's Naval Base Devonport
- Dragon Models Limited, a Hong Kong-based company that manufactures plastic model assembly kits
- Dennis Miller Live, an HBO television talk-comedy show with Dennis Miller
- Distributed mode loudspeaker, a speaker technology developed by Cambridge-based company called NXT
- Definitive Media Library, in ITIL Service Transition
- Doctor of Modern Languages, an academic degree focusing on multiple modern languages and cultures
- Domani Motus Liberi
