= The Lame Duck Congress =

- The West Wing episode
- Episode no.: Season 2 Episode 6
- Directed by: Jeremy Kagan
- Story by: Lawrence O'Donnell, Jr.
- Teleplay by: Aaron Sorkin
- Production code: 226206
- Original air date: November 8, 2000

Guest appearances
- Timothy Busfield as Danny Concannon; Emily Procter as Ainsley Hayes; Eugene Lazarev as Vassily Kononov; Mike Starr as Senator Tony Marino; NiCole Robinson as Margaret Hooper; David Kaufman as Bob Fowler; Richard Tanner as Joe Fox; Tegan West as Peter; Brian Stepanek as Senator's Aide; Wayne Wilderson as Senator's Aide

Episode chronology
| ← Previous "And It's Surely to Their Credit" | Next → "The Portland Trip" |
- The West Wing season 2

"The Lame Duck Congress" is the 28th episode of The West Wing which aired on NBC on November 8, 2000, the day following the 2000 United States Presidential election.

== Plot ==
As the last days of the lame-duck Congress roll forward, Sam Seaborn outlines a long list of Senate committee reassignments that are going to take place under the incoming GOP-led body of law, finishing with the news that a Republican opponent of the Comprehensive Nuclear Test Ban Treaty is going to head up the Senate Foreign Relations Committee and has made it clear he will not allow the Treaty to come up for voting. Sam's idea that they should try to call a lame-duck session of Congress to pass the Treaty before this happens gets the OK. Communications Director Toby Ziegler leads the effort but is stunned when he learns that recently defeated Senator Marino (D-PA) will not vote for the Treaty, because he was its primary sponsor during his Senate days. Senator Marino meets with Toby and explains that he will respect the views of the voters who sent him home largely because of his support of the Treaty, and the White House simply gives up on the Treaty for now.

Chief of Staff Leo McGarry and Press Secretary C.J. Cregg have to perform diplomatic footwork when a very pro-Western but equally pro-alcohol Ukrainian politician shows up at the White House demanding to meet with the President. Leo's tip about how the Dalai Lama was able to "accidentally" have a meeting with a former President sets up a quick discussion between the President and the Ukrainian, who leaves the White House happy to know that they look forward to working with him if/when he becomes his country's leader, and leaves the President and Leo happy that they have avoided a major international incident.

Sam responds to Leo's new guideline for shorter policy summaries by working with Ainsley Hayes on a plan to prevent small-business fraud, but she impresses Sam so much he adopts all of her ideas and sends the plan forward with 100% revisions. Sam tells her "We play with live ammo here. You convinced me. I'll convince Leo. Leo will convince the President." She asks Sam if this is how the Bartlet Administration decides to go to war, and he tells her "I'm not usually in the room when they do that."

== Production and creation ==
The story line about the Ukrainian politician was suggested by Marlin Fitzwater, who had been hired as a consultant for the show, and was based on the events during the period Fitzwater was working for President George H. W. Bush. Boris Yeltsin had requested a meeting with President Bush while Mikhail Gorbachev was still the leader of the Soviet Union. Yeltsin and Bush met in the national security advisor's office so that the White House could say that he had never been in the Oval Office.

== Analysis ==
Kimberly A. Williams believes that "The Lame Duck Congress" is series creator Aaron Sorkin's critique of the 2000 presidential candidates' approach to dealing with changes occurring in Eastern Europe at the time. She writes that the position was "although Eastern Europe reformers are 'crazy', they are 'our kind of crazy'; therefore the United States should stay the course in Eastern Europe."
