= The Hive Group =

American software company

- Type: privately held
- Industry: software
- Founded: 2000
- Fate: Merged with Visual Action Software
- Headquarters: Richardson, Texas
- Website: hivegroup.com

The Hive Group was a software company that applied visualization technology in operational intelligence (OI), business intelligence (BI), and complex event processing (CEP) contexts. The company primarily developed enterprise treemapping software used by major corporations and public agencies such as Intel Corporation, Procter & Gamble, Sun Microsystems, the United States Army, the United States Marine Corps, and the United States Coast Guard.

On January 26, 2015, The Hive Group announced that it had merged with Visual Action Software.

== History ==
The Hive Group is a privately held company founded in 2000, with headquarters in Richardson, Texas. The company’s treemapping software is called Honeycomb. Ben Shneiderman, the inventor of the treemap concept, is a member of The Hive Group’s Board of Advisors. The number of employees is believed to be fewer than 50.

== Industry recognition – Early adoption by the United States Marine Corps ==
A large quantity of information can be found, both in printed form and on the internet, detailing the Honeycomb-based USMC MERIT application. In 2003, the USMC deployed treemaps to all theaters of USMC operation. This deployment has led to broad adoption of treemaps within the United States Department of Defense and has received the following industry awards and recognition:

- US Department of Navy eGov
- US Department of Defense CIO (second place, team category)
- Excellence.Gov - Federal CIO
- Government Computing News
- International Society of Logistics Field Award
- The Association for Enterprise Information Excellence in Enterprise Integration
- Defense Logistics 2008 Technology Implementation of the Year

== Public sector ==
The Hive Group is registered as a small business in Central Contractor Registration (CCR), and in the United Nations Global Marketplace.

== Patents ==
The Hive Group holds several patents around treemapping technology (US Patents 7,027,052; 7,076,742; 7,346,858; and 7,509,591).

== Board of directors and advisors ==
The Hive Group’s board of directors and advisors include:

- Bill Jesse: Chairman, Jesse Capital Management
- Ben Shneiderman: inventor of treemapping; founding director, Human Computer Interaction Lab at the University of Maryland, College Park
- Joseph P. Urso: CEO, Aerus LLC; Chairman, Inthinc
- Pierluigi Zappacosta: Chairman, Digital Persona; Chairman, Sierra Sciences; Founder and former CEO, Logitech
