= Bottle episode =

Form of television program

In episodic television, a bottle episode or bottle show is an episode produced cheaply and restricted in scope to use as few actors, effects and sets as possible. Bottle episodes are usually shot on sets built for other episodes, frequently the main interior sets for a series, and consist largely of dialogue and scenes for which no special preparations are needed. They are commonly used when one script has fallen through and another has to be written at short notice, or because of budgetary constraints. Bottle episodes have also been used for dramatic effect, with the limited setting and cast allowing for a slower pace and deeper exploration of character traits and motives.

== Use ==
The term "bottle show" was coined by Leslie Stevens, creator and executive producer of the 1960s TV series The Outer Limits, for an episode made in very little time at very little cost, "as in pulling an episode right out of a bottle like a genie".

Bottle episodes are sometimes produced to allow as much of the budget as possible to go to the more expensive episodes of the season. Scott Brazil, executive producer of The Shield, described bottle episodes as "the sad little stepchild whose allowance is docked in order to buy big brother a new pair of sneaks".

== Examples ==
Star Trek: The Next Generation used bottle episodes so that it could spend more on special effects in other episodes.

The popularity of the Friends bottle episode "The One Where No One's Ready" led the producers to create at least one bottle episode in each season.

Other notable shows that have shown bottle episodes include The West Wing's "17 People", Family Guy, Mad About You, Parks and Recreation, Doctor Who, Breaking Bad, Archer, Girls, Community, Frasier, Mongrels, BoJack Horseman, Grey's Anatomy, Atlanta, and Chicago Fire.

=== "Bottle Episode" as title ===
Variants of the term "Bottle Episode" have been used as a title for at least three episodes of American TV series, none of which was actually a bottle episode as defined above, but instead having stories involving physical bottles. "The Bottle Episode" (Supergirl, 2020) and "Bottle Episode (But Not a 'Bottle Episode')" (Harley Quinn, 2025) both take place in the DC Comics multiverse and involve different versions of Brainiac, a supervillain who shrinks cities and stores them in bottles. The plot of a 2024 episode of The Simpsons titled "Bottle Episode" concerns bottles of wine.

== See also ==
- Clip show, an episode composed of excerpts from previous episodes; often a bottle-episode frame story in which characters reminisce about the earlier events
- Filler (media), material of lower cost or quality that is used to fill a certain television time slot
  - Filler episode, an episode that does not progress the plot
- Two-hander, a drama with only two characters; includes a list of television episodes
- List of films set in a single location

== Footnotes ==
=== References ===
- Edwards, Ted (1996). X-Files Confidential. Little, Brown and Company. ISBN 978-0-3162-1808-5.
- Goldman, Jane (1995). The X-Files Book of the Unexplained Volume I. HarperPrism. ISBN 978-0-0616-8617-7.
- Lowry, Brian (1995). The Truth is Out There: The Official Guide to the X-Files. Harper Prism. ISBN 978-0-0610-5330-6.
