= 17 People =

- The West Wing episode
- Episode no.: Season 2 Episode 18
- Directed by: Alex Graves
- Written by: Aaron Sorkin
- Production code: 226218
- Original air date: April 4, 2001

Guest appearances
- Emily Procter as Ainsley Hayes; William James Smith as Larry; Peter Duffy as Ed

Episode chronology
← Previous "The Stackhouse Filibuster"	Next → "Bad Moon Rising"
- The West Wing season 2

"17 People" is the eighteenth episode of the second season of American serial political drama The West Wing. The episode aired on April 4, 2001, on NBC. The episode depicts Josiah Bartlet, the President of the United States, informing his aide Toby Ziegler of startling news about the President's multiple sclerosis, as well as other members of the cast trying to rewrite a humorous speech the President is to give. The episode was generally praised for its intensity, as well as its complexity and stark contrast between plotlines.

== Plot ==
In the previous episode, the group learns that Vice President John Hoynes ran an opinion poll on his own favorability after publicly denouncing oil companies, with which he had previously been known for being close. In the beginning of "17 People", Toby is shown spending late nights in his office, pondering why Hoynes did that. He eventually concludes that he thinks that President Bartlet is not going to run for re-election, which turns out to be true—he had agreed to only serve one term because of his hidden multiple sclerosis diagnosis.

When Toby is told the truth, the conversation devolves into a fight in the Oval Office, where Toby excoriates the president for concealing his illness and making irresponsible decisions because of it. The president responds equally angrily, accusing Toby of arguing in bad faith. He argues that he had a right to keep his illness private, to which Toby responds that the voters have a right to make an informed decision when electing their leader. Bartlet apologizes to Toby.

Meanwhile, Sam Seaborn, Josh Lyman, Donna Moss, and Ainsley Hayes attempt to rewrite a draft of the president's speech to the White House Correspondents Dinner to make it funnier, but stall out. In the midst of this, Sam and Ainsley debate the Equal Rights Amendment (ERA) after he learns that she opposes it. Ainsley argues that she does not need a constitutional amendment to declare her equal to a man, saying that "I am mortified to discover there's reason to believe that I wasn't before". After Ainsley makes her exit to find food, Sam comments that he "could've responded", but that he'd "already moved on to other things".

Meanwhile, Josh and Donna argue after he buys her a bouquet of flowers, as Donna interprets the flowers as passive aggressive. Josh explains that it was their "anniversary", as Donna began working for him in April – ignoring the fact that she had actually started in February, but left briefly to go back to her boyfriend, only returning after they broke up. The two spar until Donna reveals that when she got into a car accident, the boyfriend stopped on his way to the hospital for a beer. Josh comments that "if you were in an accident, I wouldn't stop for a beer"; she responds "if you were in an accident, I wouldn't stop for red lights".

== Cast ==
- Martin Sheen as Josiah Bartlet, the President of the United States
- John Spencer as Leo McGarry, the White House Chief of Staff
- Bradley Whitford as Josh Lyman, the Deputy White House Chief of Staff
- Janel Moloney as Donna Moss, the assistant to Josh Lyman
- Dulé Hill as Charlie Young, the Personal Aide to the President
- Richard Schiff as Toby Ziegler, the White House Communications Director
- Allison Janney as C. J. Cregg, the White House Press Secretary
- Rob Lowe as Sam Seaborn, the Deputy White House Communications Director

== Reaction ==
Reception for the episode was generally positive. Steve Heisler, writing for The A.V. Club, gave the episode a grade of "A−" below the text of his review and a "B" in the sidebar of the article, commenting that the show highlights how The West Wing is "about people who love each other but have issues with one another, and the drama is heightened because it's POTUS." Heisler weighs in on the argument between Bartlet and Toby, commenting that while he is split between the two sides, he agrees more with Toby and argues that being President entails surrendering some privacy to the voters. Heisler then points out the contrast between the Bartlet/Toby storyline and the other subplot. He comments that when the plots intertwine with Toby walking into the Roosevelt room, where the other members of the group are testing jokes on him, while his mind is on the news he has just learned, it "broke my heart". The article ended by criticizing Josh and Donna's storyline in the episode, with Heisler quipping that "I thought Sorkin learned his lesson."

The Ringer included the episode on its list of the 20 best bottle episodes in television history, ranking the episode at seventh. The article complimented the range of the episode, writing that "the episode runs the gamut in terms of tone and stakes." The Ringer called the script's lines from Aaron Sorkin "classic", and ended the article by commenting that the episode "captures the complexities of the bonds between exhausted, impassioned, and stressed-out characters who more or less live at the office."

The Guardian included the episode in its list of the ten best episodes of The West Wing, commenting that episode was "unbearably tense" and noting its focus.

One "superfan" of The West Wing, named Jon White, made a website laying out the plot and intricacies of the episode, and how the various plotlines intertwine. When asked why White chose to illustrate "17 People", instead of a more popular episode such as "Two Cathedrals", White explained that one could essentially capture the feel of the episode by reading the script, whereas "Two Cathedrals" could only be enjoyed by watching the episode.
