= Bad Moon Rising (disambiguation) =

"Bad Moon Rising" is a 1969 song by Creedence Clearwater Revival.

Bad Moon Rising may also refer to:

== Music ==
- Bad Moon Rising: The Best of Creedence Clearwater Revival, a 2003 compilation album
- Bad Moon Rising: The Collection, a 2013 compilation album by Creedence Clearwater Revival
- Bad Moon Rising (album), 1985, by Sonic Youth
- Bad Moon Rising (band), an American hard rock group (active 1990–1998)

== Literature ==
- Bad Moon Rising (Judge Dredd novel), a 2004 sci-fi novel by David Bishop
- Bad Moon Rising: An Anthology of Political Forebodings, a 1973 sci-fi anthology
- "Bad Moon Rising", a 1993 issue of DC Comics' dark fantasy The Sandman: A Game of You
- Bad Moon Rising, a 2004 horror novel in Jonathan Maberry's Pine Deep Trilogy
- Bad Moon Rising, a 2008 expose of Sun Myung Moon and the Washington Times by John Gorenfeld
- Bad Moon Rising, a 2009 book in Sherrilyn Kenyon's Dark-Hunter series

== Television ==
- "Bad Moon Rising" (Everybody Loves Raymond), 2000
- "Bad Moon Rising" (Grimm), 2012
- "Bad Moon Rising" (The Vampire Diaries), 2010
- "Bad Moon Rising," a 2001 episode of The West Wing (season 2)
- "Pig Moon Rising," a 2017 episode of Modern Family parodying the 1969 Creedence Clearwater Revival song

== Games ==
- "Bad Moon Rising", a base script for the 2022 Blood on the Clocktower party game
