= The West Wing season 2 =

The West Wing
- Season 2
- DVD box cover. Cast from left to right: Toby, C. J., Charlie, Leo, President Bartlet, Sam, Donna and Josh
- Showrunner: Aaron Sorkin
- Starring: Rob Lowe; Dulé Hill; Allison Janney; Janel Moloney; Richard Schiff; John Spencer; Bradley Whitford; Martin Sheen
- No. of episodes: 22

Release
- Original network: NBC
- Original release: October 4, 2000 – May 16, 2001

Season chronology
- ← Previous; Season 1 Next → Season 3

The second season of the American political drama television series The West Wing aired in the United States on NBC from October 4, 2000 to May 16, 2001 and consisted of 22 episodes.

== Production ==
The second season made frequent use of flashbacks, revealing Bartlet's campaign for the presidency in the period prior to events covered in the first season. The first two episodes, "In the Shadow of Two Gunmen, Part I" and "In the Shadow of Two Gunmen, Part II", showed how many of the central characters were introduced to Josiah Bartlet, his campaign for the presidential nomination, and his election. Aaron Sorkin originally planned to have such flashbacks as a major part of the entire season, but budget and logistical demands prevented this.

== Cast ==
The second season had star billing for eight major roles. Seven of these were filled by returning main cast members from the first season, while Moira Kelly departed the cast at the end of the previous season. Rob Lowe once again receives star billing, while Martin Sheen receives the "and" credit for his role as President Josiah Bartlet. The rest of the ensemble, now including previously recurring Janel Moloney, are credited alphabetically.

=== Main cast ===
- Rob Lowe as Sam Seaborn, Deputy Communications Director
- Allison Janney as C. J. Cregg, White House Press Secretary
- Janel Moloney as Donna Moss, Assistant to the Deputy Chief of Staff
- Richard Schiff as Toby Ziegler, Communications Director
- John Spencer as Leo McGarry, White House Chief of Staff
- Bradley Whitford as Josh Lyman, Deputy Chief of Staff
- Martin Sheen as Josiah Bartlet, President of the United States
- Dulé Hill as Charlie Young, Personal Aide to the President

=== Recurring cast ===
- Timothy Busfield as Danny Concannon, senior White House correspondent for The Washington Post
- Stockard Channing as Abbey Bartlet, First Lady of the United States
- Anna Deavere Smith as Nancy McNally, National Security Advisor
- Kathryn Joosten as Dolores Landingham, Executive Secretary to the President
- Marlee Matlin as Joey Lucas, a Democratic political consultant
- Elisabeth Moss as Zoey Bartlet, The President's youngest daughter
- Tim Matheson as John Hoynes, Vice President of the United States
- Oliver Platt as Oliver Babish, White House Counsel
- Emily Procter as Ainsley Hayes, Deputy White House Counsel
- Nicole Robinson as Margaret Hooper, Assistant to the White House Chief of Staff

== Plot ==
The second season details the period between the end of President Bartlet's second year in office and the middle of his third. It covers a wider legislative array than the first season does, and presents issues including the rights of hate groups and the Comprehensive Nuclear-Test-Ban Treaty.

In this season, The West Wing characters are shown as being more capable of legislating thanks to an increased approval rating (described as a temporary "bubble" due to the shooting that ends the first season). Also vital to this theme is the new doctrine for legislating laid out in the first-season episode "Let Bartlet Be Bartlet."

The multiple sclerosis arc (also introduced in the first season) becomes central late in the second season as staff members are introduced one-by-one to the President's ailment and the public made aware. This theme remains central to the entire series.

Mrs. Landingham, the longtime secretary of President Bartlet, dies in the penultimate episode, "18th and Potomac." In the final episode, "Two Cathedrals," Mrs. Landingham's funeral is central as is the question of whether the President will run for re-election.

The season ends with the President announcing his multiple sclerosis, and concludes just moments before he answers a reporter's question: "Mr. President, can you tell us right now if you'll be seeking a second term?"

== Episodes ==
No. overall	No. in season	Title	Directed by	Written by	Original release date	Prod. code	US viewers (millions)
23	1	"In the Shadow of Two Gunmen"	Thomas Schlamme	Aaron Sorkin	October 4, 2000	226201	25.05
24	2	"In the Shadow of Two Gunmen"	Thomas Schlamme	Aaron Sorkin	October 4, 2000	226202	25.05
During the aftermath of the shooting in Rosslyn, it becomes obvious that President Bartlet was shot in the back, Josh in the stomach, Charlie (the apparent target of the racist shooters, which a conspirator later confirms when he is arrested) remained unharmed, and the two shooters died at the scene. Gina reports an accomplice and a signal to the shooters from the ground. The motorcade heads first toward the White House and then to the George Washington University Hospital; Zoey, Leo, and Abbey join the President at the hospital. Josh, in critical condition, arrives in an ambulance, and Sam and Toby join the crowd. As Josh goes under general anesthesia, he starts to experience a series of flashbacks, first to the time when he ran the campaign for the nomination of Sen. Hoynes. He then listened to Leo's urging of him to go to Nashua, New Hampshire, to check out Gov. Bartlet, and then a completely impressed Josh recruited Sam from a miserable, white-collar law job in NYC to join him and help elect "the real thing." Meanwhile, a high-level meeting takes place in the Situation Room. Toby also has a flashback about Nashua, when then-Gov. Bartlet's cronies want him fired. Leo instead fires them all and keeps Toby, telling Jed that he is sick of terrible campaigns between terrible candidates and wants to show a good man can be elected President of the United States. A large group of state and federal police grab the accomplice. C.J., in flashback, recalls the time when Toby, on behalf of Leo, invited her to join the Bartlet presidential campaign after she was fired from a high-powered Hollywood PR job to appease an incompetent, arrogant studio executive; in the present, she has several problems with the press corps and with her own memory. During a flashback about the campaign in New Hampshire, Gov. Bartlet explains the meaning of "What's next?", and Donna, who had driven from Wisconsin, introduces herself to Josh as his new assistant, then admits that she "may have overstated a little", yet he puts her on the staff. Josh also reflects on how Jed won the important Illinois primary the same night his father Noah died; after delaying his victory speech to console Josh, Jed tells Leo he's now "ready" to run for President. Eventually, after more flashbacks, Josh awakes from anesthesia, and he weakly asks the President, "What's next?" Note: Won an Emmy for Outstanding Directing for a Drama Series. Also submitted for Outstanding Drama win. Nominated for Outstanding Writing for a Drama Series. Allison Janney and Bradley Whitford won Emmys for Outstanding Supporting Actress and Actor in a Drama Series with Part 2 of this episode. John Spencer submitted Part 1 as a nominee Outstanding Supporting Actor.
25	3	"The Midterms"	Alex Graves	Aaron Sorkin	October 18, 2000	226203	16.80
Josh, speaking from his hospital bed, advises C.J. at the West Wing. Since the shooting the job-approval rate of the Bartlet administration has risen from 51% to 81%. While the senior staff prepares for the midterm elections, 12 weeks away, much debate and discussion take place. Sam strongly encourages one of his law-school classmates, Tom, to run for a seat in the Congress. However, C.J. and Leo separately learn damaging facts about Tom and racism, so Leo directs Sam to cancel the support for Tom and Sam is left saddened and shaken. Later Josh returns to his apartment, where Donna visits him, often taking lunch and papers. The President takes an unusual interest in a school board election, which the senior staff is alarmed to learn is because a Republican who shared mutual loathing with (and narrowly lost a Congressional race to) Bartlet is running for an open spot, but the President eventually accepts his old foe will win that important, if overlooked, contest. Toby remains in a morose mood while he seeks to act against hate groups, and the President speaks with him. The President makes an appearance at a reception for radio talk show hosts, where he engages, questions, and completely blows apart the reactionary views of a radio counselor with a polemic on the usefulness of Leviticus. Charlie has behaved toward Zoey in a cool and distant way since the attempt on his life, but warms up. C.J., Sam, Toby, and Donna chat with Josh on his front steps, and they share a patriotic toast.
26	4	"In This White House"	Ken Olin	Story by : Peter Parnell & Allison Abner; Teleplay by : Aaron Sorkin	October 25, 2000	226204	17.12
Josh returns to work. On a television political talk show a young woman Southern Republican lawyer, Ainsley Hayes (Emily Procter), soundly trounces Sam on the subject of competing bills under consideration in the House for funding of improvements in public education. The president of the African nation of Kundu, representing several African countries, visits the White House during a summit of officials of US pharmaceutical firms in an attempt to make certain drugs more accessible to HIV-blighted regions of Africa. At the direction of President Bartlet, Leo hires Ainsley as an associate counsel, and she takes the job after angrily telling her Republican friends that their disagreements with the Bartlet Administration are both personal and utter garbage. The Kundunese President learns there has been a coup in his country and his family is either dead or has fled the country; he is offered sanctuary in the United States but says he must return to help his people--where coup forces murder him at the airport upon his arrival in Kundu.
27	5	"And It's Surely to Their Credit"	Christopher Misiano	Story by : Kevin Falls & Laura Glasser; Teleplay by : Aaron Sorkin	November 1, 2000	226205	18.47
Josh runs into trouble with an insurance carrier over its refusal to pay $50,000 of his hospital bill; while Sam lends a hand, he suggest Josh sue the Ku Klux Klan, who were indirectly responsible for him getting shot. President Bartlet uses many takes to tape a radio address. Ainsley meets her new boss, Lionel Tribbey (John Larroquette), the White House Counsel, who puts on quite a show. The first lady says the President is well enough for sex, but he faces frustrating delays. C.J. has to deal with a decorated Army general who finds the administration's defense pathetic; she eventually finds out he wears medals he may not have earned and gets him to shut up, but the President later tells her to allow him to speak. Leo shows Ainsley to her basement office. Lionel welcomes her in his own way, and he assigns her first task, which takes her into conflict with two other staff lawyers; Sam deals with the conflict. Sam, Josh, C.J., and Toby help Ainsley with the decor in her office. Note: The episode title refers to the song "He Is an Englishman" from the comic opera H.M.S. Pinafore.
28	6	"The Lame Duck Congress"	Jeremy Kagan	Story by : Lawrence O'Donnell, Jr. Teleplay by : Aaron Sorkin	November 8, 2000	226206	18.49
An announcement by a senator makes it appear that the administration will likely have no chance of a favorable vote on the Comprehensive Nuclear Test Ban Treaty in the next session of the Senate, so Josh, Sam, and Toby urge President Bartlet to call a lame-duck session that will get the 12 Democratic senators who were voted out a chance to pass the treaty. C.J. intentionally leaks to Danny that the President has begun to consider that possibility. A Ukrainian politician, who is both pro-U.S. and a raging alcoholic, arrives at the White House and demands to speak with the President; Josh meets him and a companion and deals with them. Ainsley goes with Sam to Capitol Hill for meetings. Sam asks Ainsley to summarize a 22-page position paper; she does so and more. Toby meets with a lame-duck Senator from Pennsylvania who explains to a surprised Toby why he will not go against the wishes of his home state's voters. Leo arranges for the President to speak briefly with the foreign politician. The President decides not to call a special session.
29	7	"The Portland Trip"	Paris Barclay	Story by : Paul Redford; Teleplay by : Aaron Sorkin	November 15, 2000	226207	18.47
Sam, Toby, and C.J. accompany President Bartlet on a red-eye flight aboard Air Force One to Portland, Oregon, for a major presidential speech on public education. Meanwhile, back at the West Wing, Leo and others deal with an oil tanker suspected of hauling forbidden black-market Iraqi crude oil in violation of UN sanctions, and Josh talks with a gay Republican member of the House who supports a bill against same-sex marriage. Sam questions his writing ability when he cannot find or create an inspiring tone for the speech. Charlie proposes a concept, which gets the President's attention and Toby's recommendation.
30	8	"Shibboleth"	Laura Innes	Story by : Patrick Caddell; Teleplay by : Aaron Sorkin	November 22, 2000	226208	17.49
Just before Thanksgiving Day a container ship arrives in San Diego, California, from East Asia; one container holds 83 surviving refugees from the People's Republic of China and the bodies of 13 who have died during the voyage; the survivors claim to be Christian evangelicals fleeing from persecution by the Communist government, and they request religious asylum. Toby and President Bartlet add the name of Josephine McGarry, Leo's sister, to a list of recess appointments, but Leo opposes the move. Leo points out a particular photograph in a newspaper, which helps him persuade her to withdraw. The President summons a representative of the Chinese illegal immigrants and speaks briefly with him in the Oval Office; the President then talks with the governor of California by telephone and makes arrangements to serve the needs of the immigrants and to allow the Chinese government to save face. Charlie spends a great deal of time finding a new carving knife for the President, who gives Charlie the one passed down through his family from Paul Revere. The President pardons one turkey and drafts another into military service. Note: Nominated for Outstanding Directing for a Drama Series. Also submitted as part of out Outstanding Drama win.
31	9	"Galileo"	Alex Graves	Kevin Falls and Aaron Sorkin	November 29, 2000	226209	18.99
NASA prepares to receive the first pictures from their new Mars probe, accompanied by a live broadcast with the President. Meanwhile, the Russian government covers up a missile silo fire, a report that the President does not like green beans poses an electoral problem in Oregon, and Josh investigates the consequences of honoring a man who called for Puerto Rican statehood. C.J. promotes a staffer to Deputy Press Secretary but then faces a slew of disappointed interviewees at a Kennedy Center concert. Note: Submitted as part of Emmy win for Outstanding Drama. Allison Janney won the Emmy for Outstanding Supporting Actress with episode.
32	10	"Noël"	Thomas Schlamme	Story by : Peter Parnell; Teleplay by : Aaron Sorkin	December 13, 2000 (Note: In Canada; the US airing was pre-empted for one week by Al Gore's concession speech in the 2000 United States presidential election.)	226210	18.28
Josh grows ever more anxious and volatile after his shooting, and is ordered by Leo to see a psychiatrist. C.J. uncovers a Nazi-looted painting at the White House and Sam voices support for tapping the Strategic Petroleum Reserve. Cellist Yo-Yo Ma makes a guest appearance. Note: Submitted as part of Emmy win for Outstanding Drama. Bradley Whitford won an Emmy for Outstanding Supporting Actor in a Drama Series with this episode.
33	11	"The Leadership Breakfast"	Scott Winant	Story by : Paul Redford; Teleplay by : Aaron Sorkin	January 10, 2001	226211	17.66
With Congress reconvening, the White House is planning a "leadership breakfast" to encourage bipartisan cooperation. Toby locks horns in negotiations with the Republican Majority Leader's new chief of staff on minimum wage, against C.J.'s wishes and to a truly disastrous end. Both Sam and Donna try, and fail, to impress an influential newspaper columnist. Note: John Spencer and Richard Schiff submitted this episode as Emmy nominees for Outstanding Supporting Actor in a Drama Series.
34	12	"The Drop-In"	Lou Antonio	Story by : Lawrence O'Donnell, Jr. Teleplay by : Aaron Sorkin	January 24, 2001	226212	18.02
Leo tries to convince President Bartlet of the importance of supporting a missile defense plan, while Lord John Marbury is appointed British ambassador to the United States. Toby and Sam clash over a speech the President gives to an environmental group. C.J. tries to talk a comedian out of embarrassing the Bartlet administration.
35	13	"Bartlet's Third State of the Union"	Christopher Misiano	Story by : Allison Abner & Dee Dee Myers; Teleplay by : Aaron Sorkin	February 7, 2001	226213	18.20
The President addresses the nation, and five DEA agents are taken hostage in Colombia. C.J. discovers an invited guest to the State of the Union speech has a questionable background, while Capital Beat does a three-hour show live from the West Wing. Josh, Joey Lucas (Marlee Matlin), and Donna run an important telephone survey that will influence a gun-control initiative the staff has been planning. Note: Stockard Channing submitted this episode as an Emmy nominee for Outstanding Supporting Actress in a Drama Series.
36	14	"The War at Home"	Christopher Misiano	Aaron Sorkin	February 14, 2001	226214	18.40
The crisis over the missing DEA agents in Colombia intensifies, as well as the fallout from the State of the Union Address. Note: Submitted as part of Emmy win for Outstanding Drama. Stockard Channing submitted this episode as an Emmy nominee for Outstanding Supporting Actress in a Drama Series.
37	15	"Ellie"	Michael Engler	Story by : Kevin Falls & Laura Glasser; Teleplay by : Aaron Sorkin	February 21, 2001	226215	16.43
The President is put in a tricky spot when the Surgeon General makes questionable comments regarding the legalization of marijuana, and his daughter Ellie makes a comment supporting her to Danny Concannon. Toby spars anew with his ex-wife but finds a clever way to work on Social Security reform, and Sam gets tough with a film producer who took a cheap shot at the President.
38	16	"Somebody's Going to Emergency, Somebody's Going to Jail"	Jessica Yu	Paul Redford & Aaron Sorkin	February 28, 2001	226216	18.09
The staff participates in "Big Block of Cheese Day," Toby is assigned to speak with a group of unruly anarchists protesting the WTO, C.J. meets with The Organization of Cartographers for Social Equality advocating for an inverted Peters projection, and a friend of Donna asks Sam to consider a pardon request for an alleged Cold War spy. Note: The episode title refers to the song "New York Minute" by Don Henley, which was used in the episode. Rob Lowe submitted this episode as an Emmy nominee for Outstanding Lead Actor in a Drama Series. Note: In the episode, Josh tells Sam that President Abraham Lincoln signed a pardon on the day of his assassination. However, in 2011 it was discovered that he had signed the pardon in question exactly one year before his death, and that the date was altered by an amateur historian.
39	17	"The Stackhouse Filibuster"	Bryan Gordon	Story by : Pete McCabe; Teleplay by : Aaron Sorkin	March 14, 2001	226217	17.17
Staffers are blindsided when an elderly Senator begins a Friday night filibuster before a vote on a crucial health care bill, until Donna discovers information that changes their perspective. Meanwhile, Toby is puzzled when the Vice President, normally a champion of the oil industry, volunteers to attack it for "price gouging", and Sam is alternately annoyed at and impressed by a feisty GAO intern.
40	18	"17 People"	Alex Graves	Aaron Sorkin	April 4, 2001	226218	16.56
Toby is told about the President's multiple sclerosis, becoming the 17th person to know, and he and the President have a heated row over the matter. Meanwhile, the President considers an extensive security alert for the nation's airports, and staffers struggle to punch up a speech the President is set to give at the White House Correspondents' Dinner. Note: Submitted as part of Emmy Win for Outstanding Drama. Richard Schiff submitted this episode as a nominee for Outstanding Supporting Actor.
41	19	"Bad Moon Rising"	Bill Johnson	Story by : Felicia Wilson; Teleplay by : Aaron Sorkin	April 25, 2001	226219	16.78
The President decides that he needs an opinion from White House Counsel Oliver Babish (Oliver Platt) on whether his MS cover-up constituted a criminal conspiracy. Meanwhile, an oil spill off the Delaware coast hits home to Sam, Josh must deal with a Mexican economic crisis, and C.J. searches for the source of a press leak about a possible change in the President's position on school vouchers.
42	20	"The Fall's Gonna Kill You"	Christopher Misiano	Story by : Patrick Caddell; Teleplay by : Aaron Sorkin	May 2, 2001	226220	16.62
White House Counsel Oliver Babish questions C.J. and Abbey about the President's MS cover-up. The staff begins to develop a strategy to deal with the impending MS crisis. Josh learns of a problem with funding for the government's Big Tobacco lawsuit. Sam works on a speech involving a tax increase and is later told the MS story.
43	21	"18th and Potomac"	Robert Berlinger	Story by : Lawrence O'Donnell, Jr. Teleplay by : Aaron Sorkin	May 9, 2001	226221	17.01
A crisis in Haiti takes much of the President and Leo's time, while the senior staff are planning the announcement of the President's MS. The democratically elected new Haitian president is facing a military coup and the U.S. finds itself in the middle of the storm when a U.S. diplomat smuggles the new President into the safety of the U.S. Embassy in Port-au-Prince. An evacuation operation turns deadly when U.S. soldiers shoot and kill several rebel Haitians who tried to stop a plane from taking off at the airport. Donna is told by Toby about the President's condition. The staff considers how to deal with the bad news of a poll by Joey Lucas that reveals voters have hugely negative reactions to the possibility of a politician having a potentially fatal disease and covering it up. The President agrees with Leo that he should have a discussion with the staff about whether or not to seek re-election. Josh follows up on his previous week's discovery that a Congressional lawsuit against major tobacco companies is running into funding problems. In a brief conversation with Mrs. Landingham, directly before she goes to collect her first new car, the President says he'd like to have a word with her on her return. It is later revealed that she was killed by a drunk driver. Note: The episode title refers to the intersection in Washington, D.C. where Mrs. Landingham is killed.
44	22	"Two Cathedrals"	Thomas Schlamme	Aaron Sorkin	May 16, 2001	226222	20.72
A tropical storm is bearing down on Washington on the day the President is to disclose to the American people that he has MS. The President attends Mrs. Landingham's funeral, beset with memories of how they met. Staffers must also fashion two responses to the question that is certain to be asked first at Bartlet's prime-time press conference: Will the President seek re-election? Note: Submitted as part of Emmy win for Outstanding Drama. Martin Sheen submitted this episode as a nominee for Outstanding Lead Actor in a Drama Series.

== Reception ==
=== Critical response ===
On Rotten Tomatoes, the season has an approval rating of 88% with an average score of 10 out of 10 based on 24 reviews. The website's critical consensus reads, "President Bartlet is tested by his biggest scandal yet, but The West Wing's approval ratings are way up in a second season that is teeming with dramas on a national scale and burning with an idealistic fervor that will have viewers cheering."

=== Accolades ===
The second season received 18 Emmy Award nominations for the 53rd Primetime Emmy Awards, winning a total of 8 awards. Consecutive wins included Outstanding Drama Series, Outstanding Supporting Actress in a Drama Series (Allison Janney), Outstanding Directing for a Drama Series (Thomas Schlamme for "In the Shadow of Two Gunmen"), and Outstanding Cinematography for a Single Camera Series (Thomas Del Ruth). Bradley Whitford won for Outstanding Supporting Actor in a Drama Series, and the series also won for Outstanding Casting for a Drama Series, Outstanding Single Camera Picture Editing for a Series, and Outstanding Single Camera Sound Mixing for a Series. Notable nominations included Martin Sheen and Rob Lowe for Outstanding Lead Actor in a Drama Series, John Spencer and Richard Schiff for Outstanding Supporting Actor in a Drama Series, Stockard Channing for Outstanding Supporting Actress in a Drama Series, Oliver Platt for Outstanding Guest Actor in a Drama Series, Aaron Sorkin for Outstanding Writing for a Drama Series for "In the Shadow of Two Gunmen", and Laura Innes for Outstanding Directing for a Drama Series for "Shibboleth".

Thomas Del Ruth won an award from the American Society of Cinematographers for the episode "Noël".
