= The West Wing =

American political drama television series (1999–2006)

- Genre: Political drama
- Created by: Aaron Sorkin
- Showrunners: Aaron Sorkin; John Wells
- Starring: Rob Lowe; Moira Kelly; Dulé Hill; Allison Janney; Richard Schiff; John Spencer; Bradley Whitford; Martin Sheen; Janel Moloney; Stockard Channing; Joshua Malina; Mary McCormack; Jimmy Smits; Alan Alda; Kristin Chenoweth
- Composer: W. G. Snuffy Walden
- Country of origin: United States
- Original language: English
- No. of seasons: 7
- No. of episodes: 154 (Note: This includes the special episodes "Documentary Special" and "Isaac and Ishmael", but not the 2020 special "A West Wing Special to Benefit When We All Vote" (primarily a restaging of "Hartsfield's Landing").) (list of episodes)

Production
- Executive producers: Aaron Sorkin; John Wells; Thomas Schlamme; Christopher Misiano; Alex Graves; Lawrence O'Donnell; Peter Noah
- Cinematography: Thomas Del Ruth
- Running time: 42 minutes
- Production companies: John Wells Productions; Warner Bros. Television

Original release
- Network: NBC
- Release: September 22, 1999 – May 14, 2006

The West Wing is an American political drama television series created by Aaron Sorkin that was originally broadcast on NBC from September 22, 1999, to May 14, 2006. The series is set primarily in the West Wing of the White House, where the Oval Office and offices of presidential senior personnel are located, during the fictional two-term Democratic administration of President Josiah Bartlet.

The West Wing was produced by Warner Bros. Television and features an ensemble cast, including Rob Lowe, Dulé Hill, Allison Janney, Richard Schiff, John Spencer, Bradley Whitford, Martin Sheen, Janel Moloney, and Stockard Channing. For the first four seasons, there were three executive producers: Sorkin (lead writer of the first four seasons), Thomas Schlamme (primary director), and John Wells. After Sorkin left the series at the end of the fourth season, Wells assumed the role of head writer, with later executive producers being directors Alex Graves and Christopher Misiano (seasons 6–7), and writers Lawrence O'Donnell and Peter Noah (season 7).

The West Wing has been regarded by many publications as one of the greatest television shows of all time. It has received praise from critics, political science professors, and former White House staffers and has been the subject of critical analysis. The West Wing received a multitude of accolades, including two Peabody Awards, three Golden Globe Awards, and 26 Primetime Emmy Awards, including four consecutive wins for Outstanding Drama Series (2000—2003). The show's ratings waned in later years following the departure of series creator Sorkin after the fourth season (after having been the writer or co-writer of 85 of the first 88 episodes), yet it remained popular among high-income viewers, a key demographic for the show and its advertisers, with around 16 million viewers.

== Cast and characters ==
The West Wing employed a broad ensemble cast to portray the many positions involved in the daily work of the Executive Branch of the federal government. The president, the first lady, and the president's senior staff and advisers form the core cast. Numerous secondary characters, appearing intermittently, complement storylines that generally revolve around this core group.

=== Main cast ===
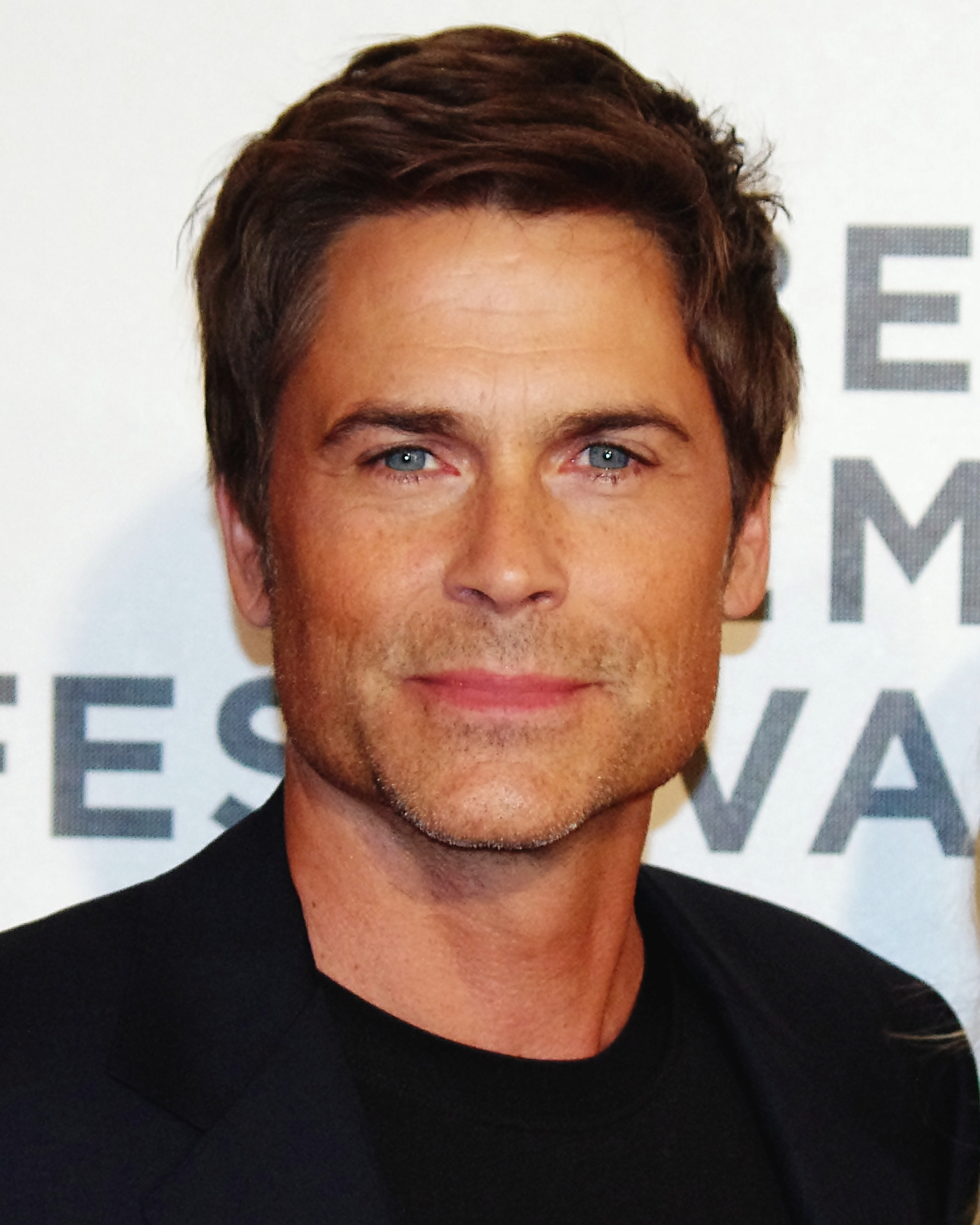
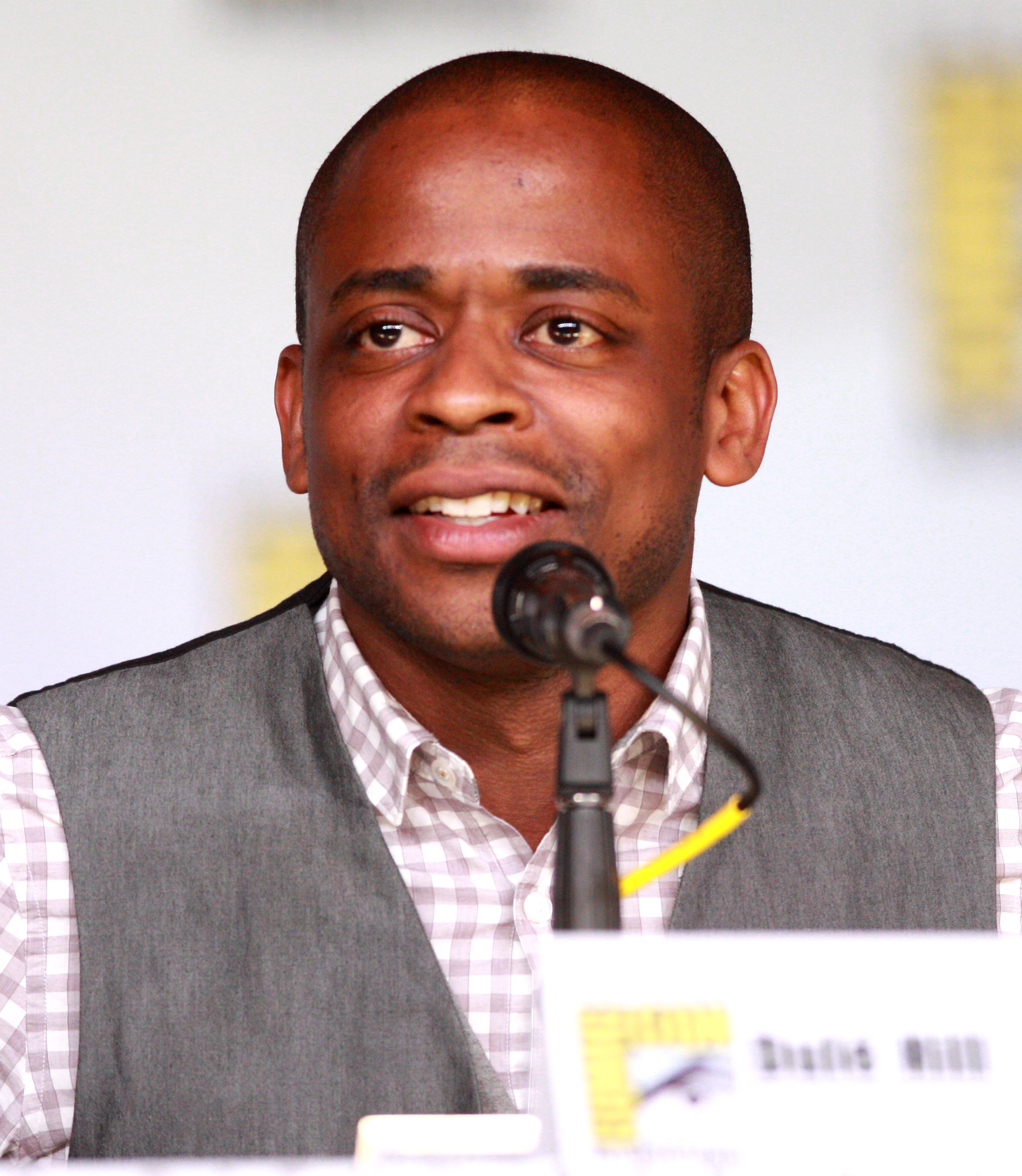
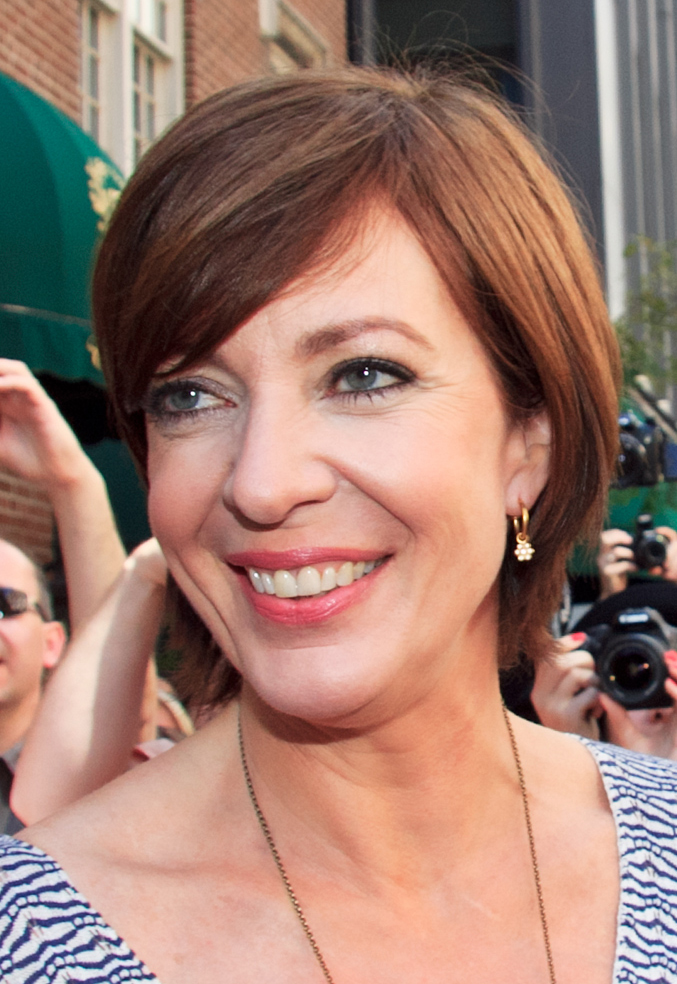
Rob Lowe, Dulé Hill and Allison Janney
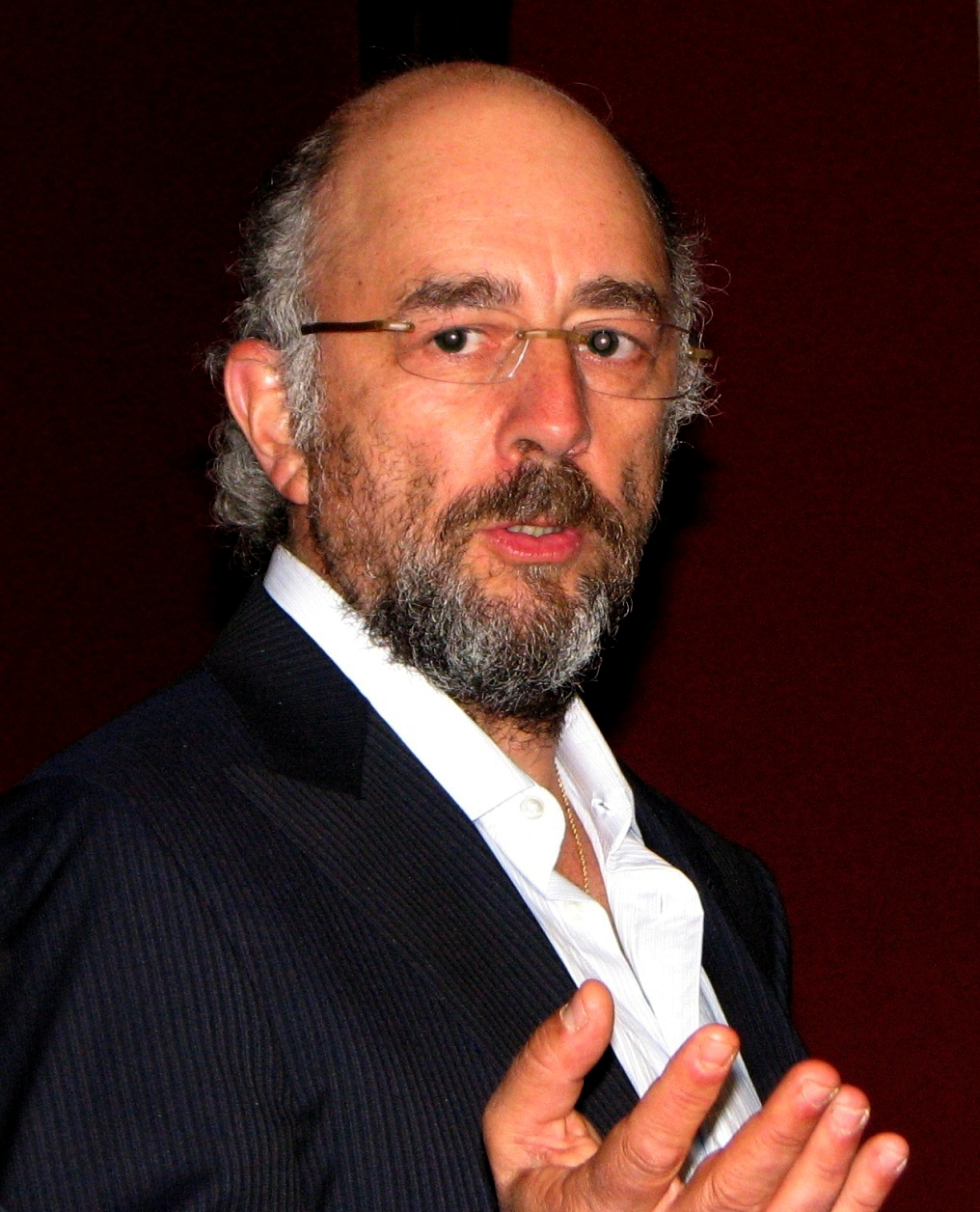
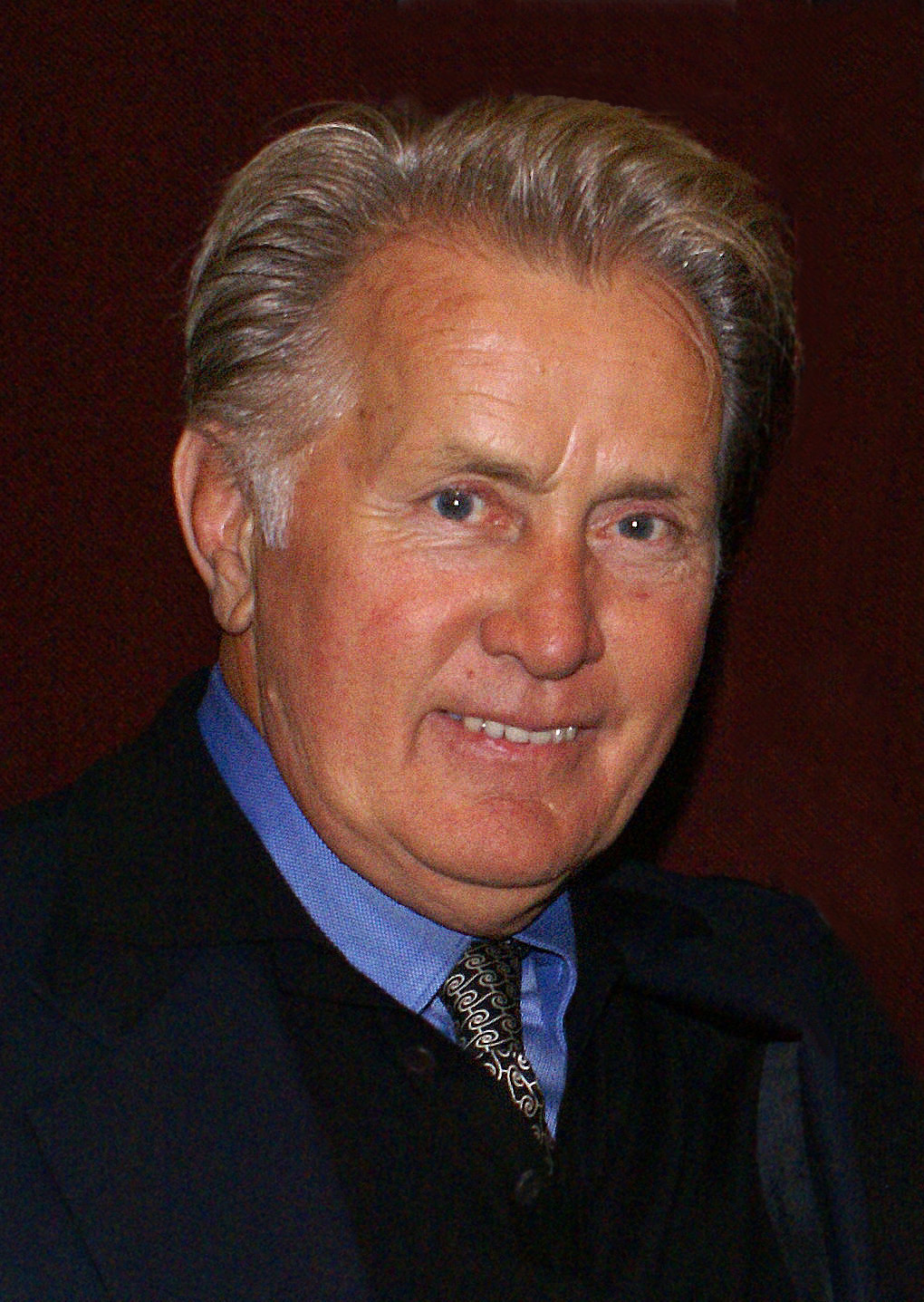
Richard Schiff, John Spencer and Martin Sheen
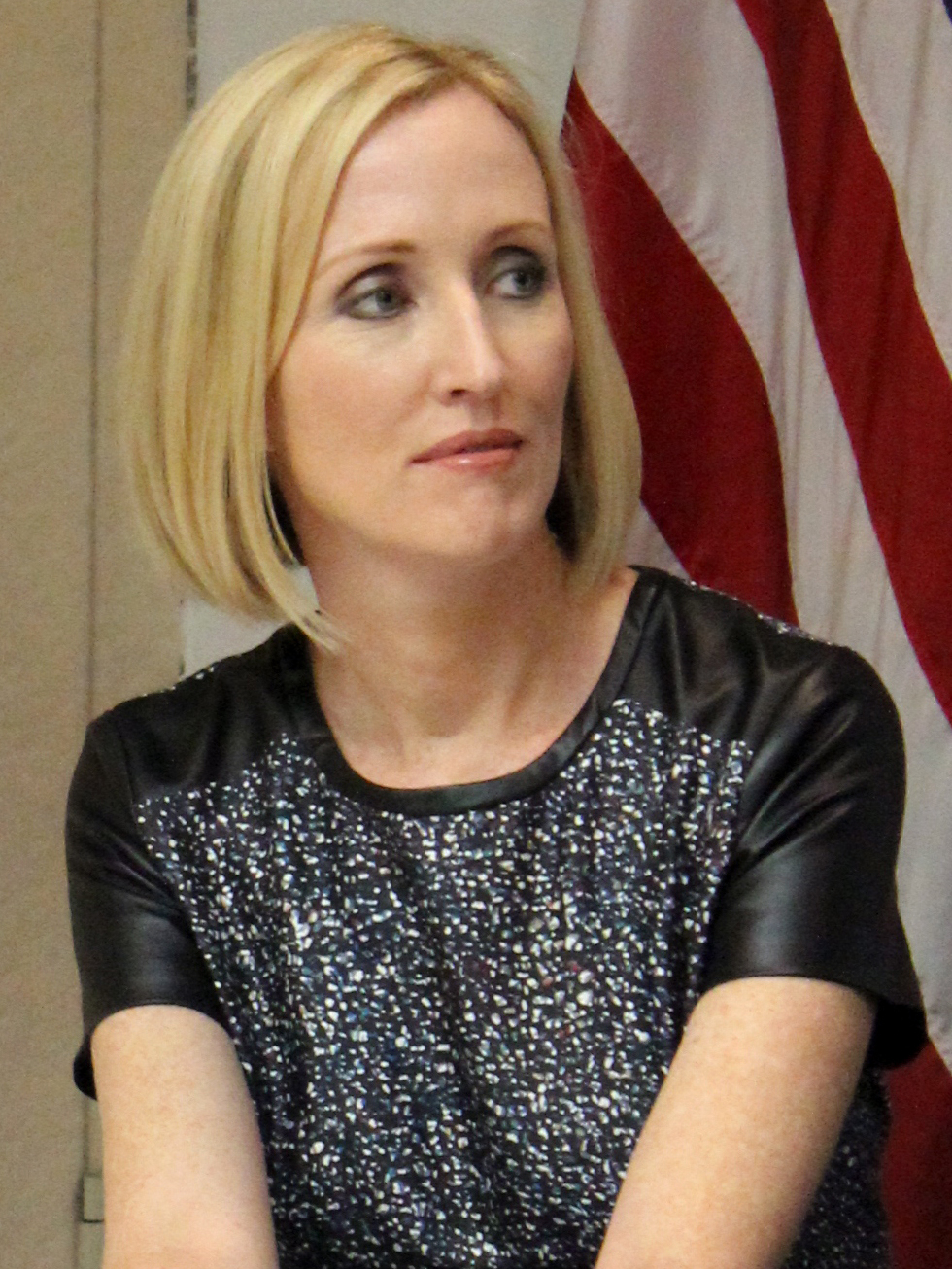
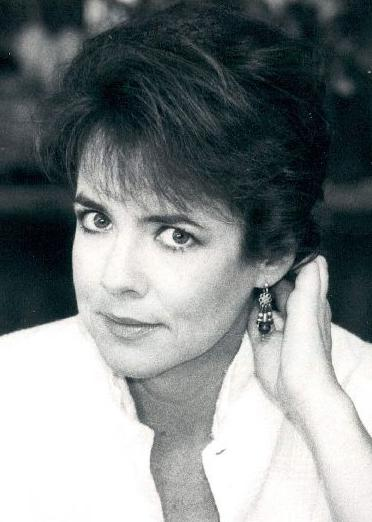
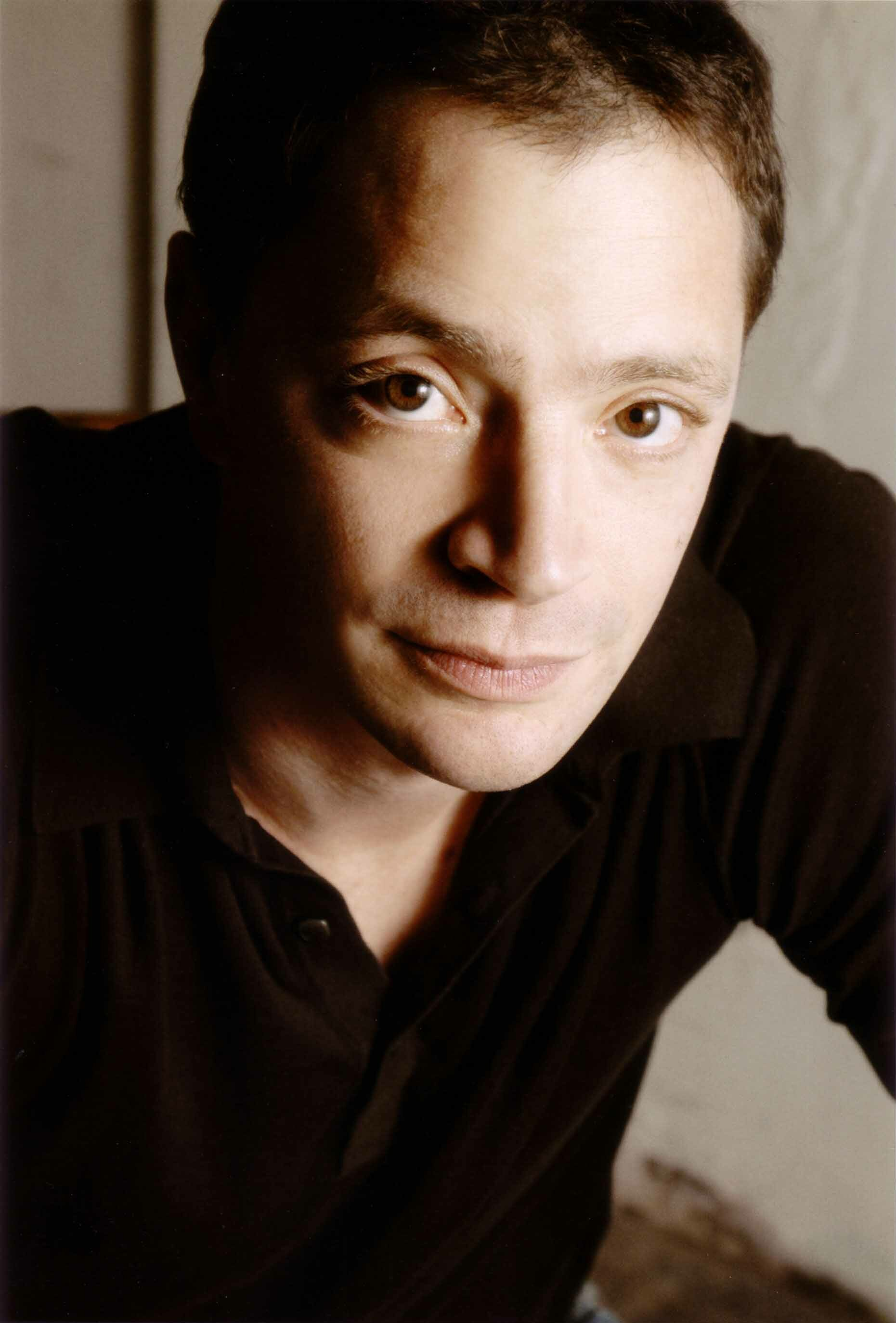
Janel Moloney, Stockard Channing and Joshua Malina
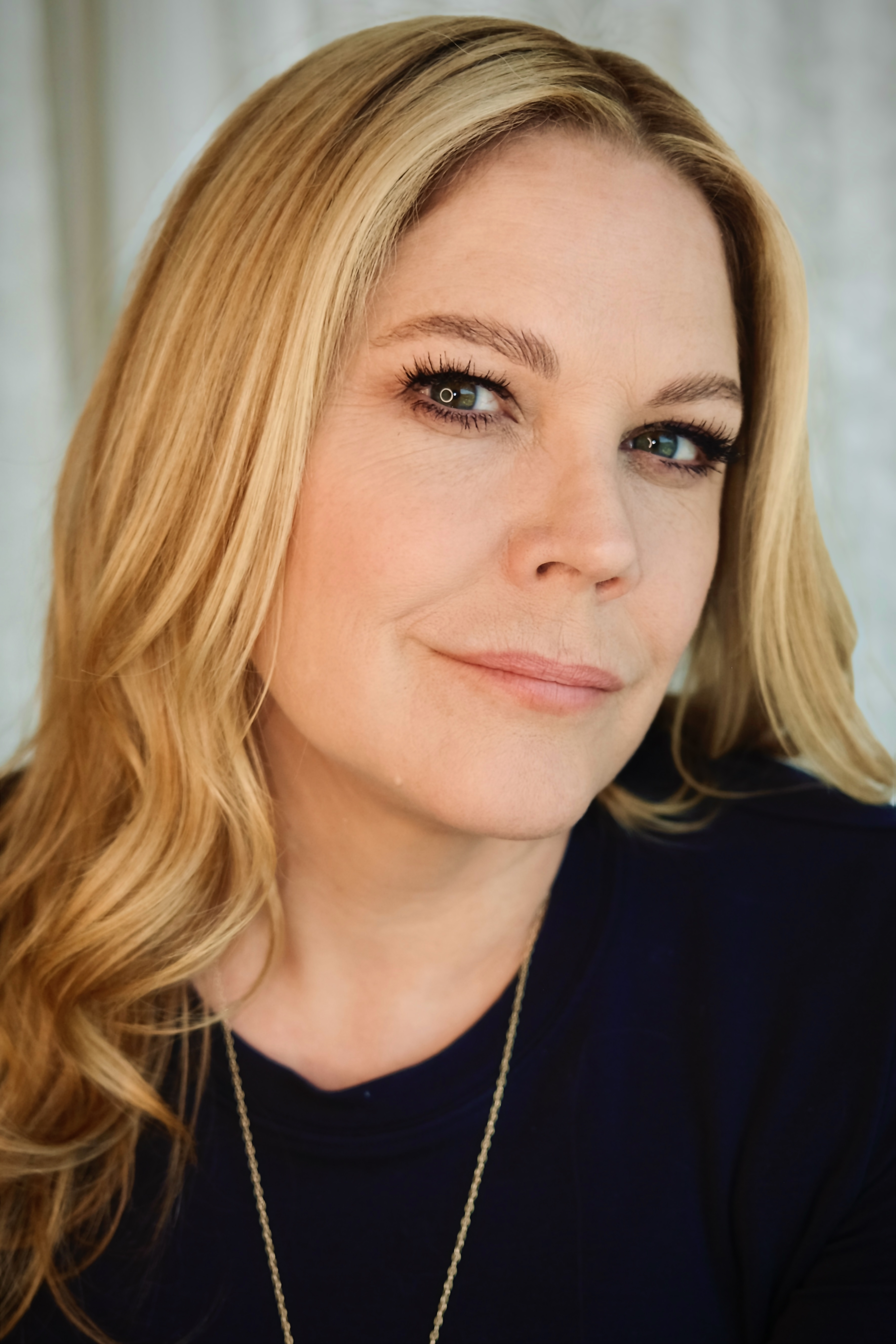
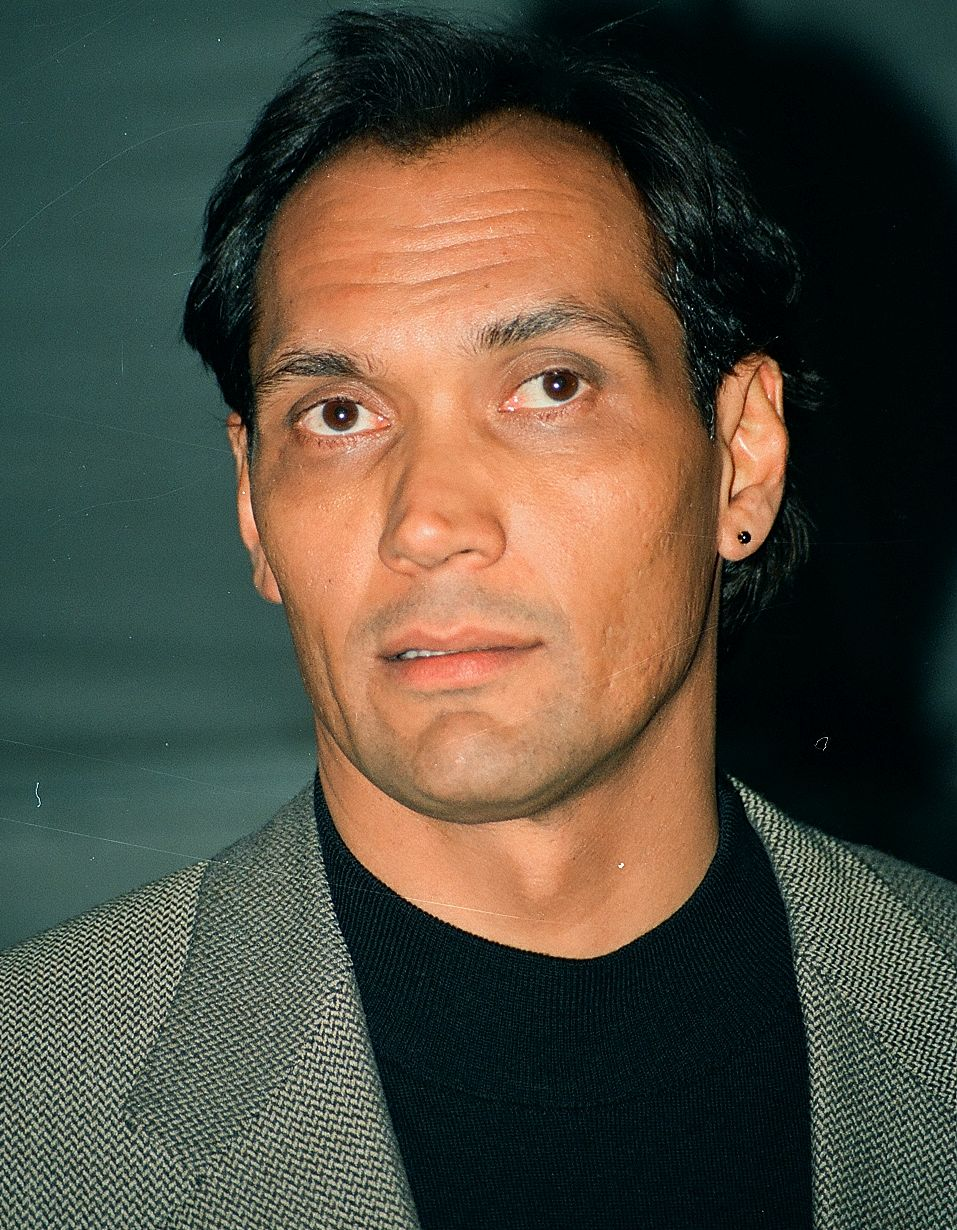
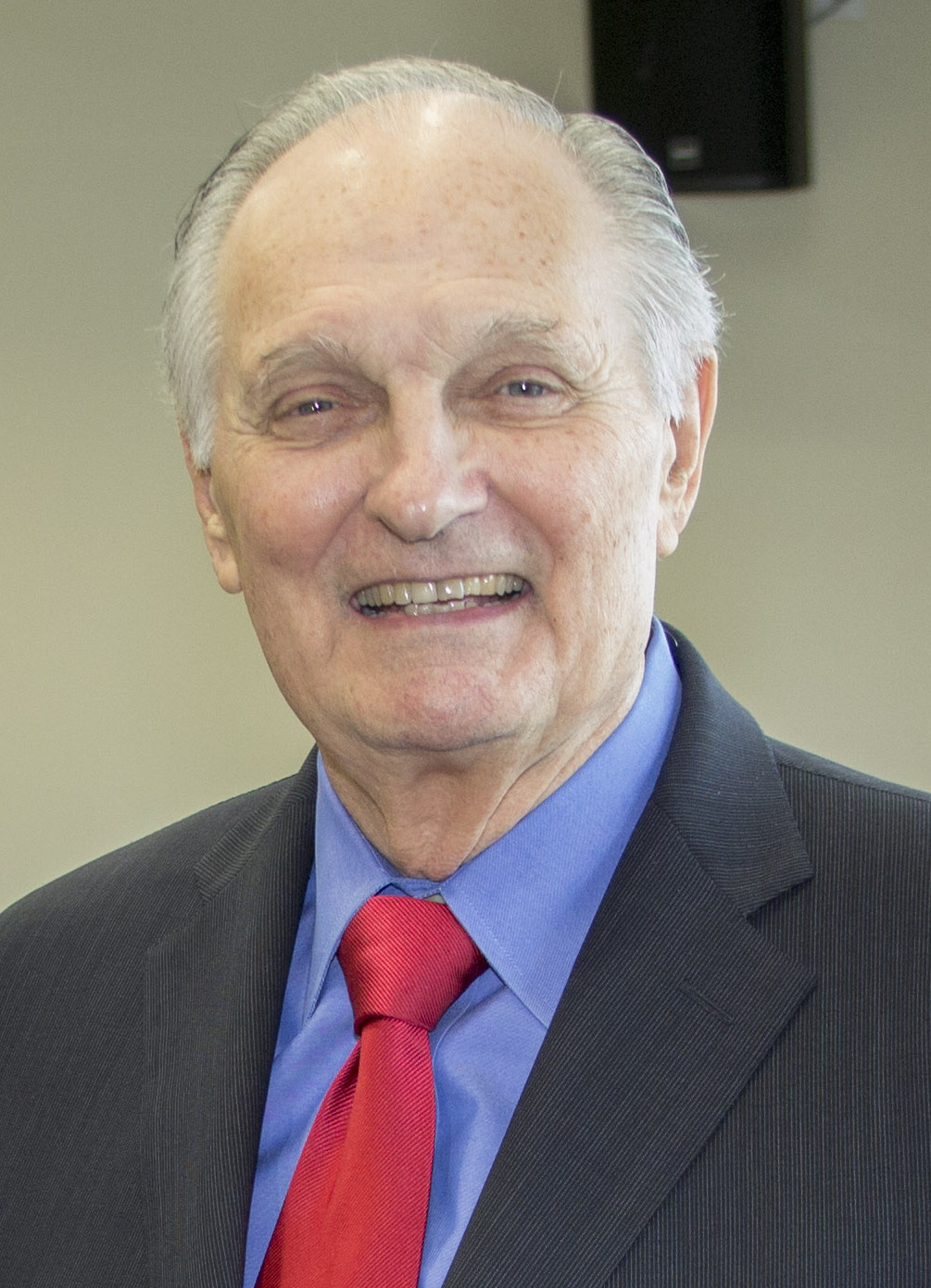
Mary McCormack, Jimmy Smits and Alan Alda
- Rob Lowe as Sam Seaborn (seasons 1–4; guest season 7): the deputy communications director to Toby Ziegler. In his time at the White House, Sam is responsible for writing many of Bartlet's speeches. Following the reelection of President Bartlet, he departs the White House to run for Congress. He is recruited to become Santos's deputy chief of staff at the series end.
- Moira Kelly as Mandy Hampton (season 1): a media consultant contracted by the Bartlet administration and is Josh Lyman's ex-girlfriend. She departs without explanation following the first season.
- Allison Janney as C. J. Cregg: the press secretary. She succeeds Leo McGarry as chief of staff and departs the White House at the end of the Bartlet administration. Post-series, she marries Danny Concannon and has a child.
- Richard Schiff as Toby Ziegler: the communications director who writes many of Bartlet's speeches, including both inaugural addresses and many State of the Union addresses. He is fired from the Bartlet administration after confessing to illegally leaking highly classified information about a secret space shuttle, though he is pardoned for his crimes at the series' end. He has twin children with his ex-wife, Andrea Wyatt, who is a congresswoman from Maryland.
- John Spencer as Leo McGarry: Bartlet's close personal friend and chief of staff. Following a heart attack, he becomes counselor to the president, and later the Democratic candidate for vice president. He wins but dies before assuming office.
- Bradley Whitford as Josh Lyman: the deputy chief of staff to Leo McGarry. Josh later leaves the White House to become the "Santos for President" campaign manager. When Santos is elected, Josh becomes White House Chief of Staff.
- Martin Sheen as Jed Bartlet: the president of the United States. An economist by training, he is a former congressman and governor from New Hampshire who unexpectedly won the Democratic Party nomination. He has multiple sclerosis, a fact he initially hides from the electorate. Sheen described him as a conglomeration of John F. Kennedy, Jimmy Carter, and Bill Clinton. He is succeeded by Matt Santos.
- Janel Moloney as Donna Moss (seasons 2–7; recurring season 1): the senior assistant to Josh Lyman. She later departs to be a spokesperson for the Russell campaign and then the Santos campaign. Upon Santos's election, she becomes chief of staff to the first lady.
- Dulé Hill as Charlie Young: originally the personal aide to the president and later a deputy special assistant to the chief of staff. He is in a relationship with Zoey Bartlet. At the series end he begins to study law at Georgetown.
- Stockard Channing as Abbey Bartlet (seasons 3–7; recurring seasons 1–2): the First Lady, Jed's wife, and a physician.
- Kathryn Joosten as Mrs. Landingham, the President's personal secretary (seasons 1–2): Bartlett's mentor since high school (shown in a flashback episode with Kirsten Nelson as Landingham), is his indispensable, trusted, personal gatekeeper and maternalistic caretaker. Tragedy takes her from the series, triggering an existential crisis for President Bartlett.
- Joshua Malina as Will Bailey (seasons 4–7): initially hired as a speechwriter and moves into the role of deputy communications director. He later becomes chief of staff to the vice president, Russell's campaign manager, and communications director. After the series end he becomes a congressman for Oregon.
- Mary McCormack as Kate Harper (seasons 6–7; recurring season 5): the Deputy National Security Advisor. Before the West Wing she was in the Navy, and CIA.
- Jimmy Smits as Matt Santos (seasons 6–7): a congressman from Texas and the former mayor of Houston who is convinced by Josh Lyman to run for president. He eventually wins the nomination and later the election.
- Alan Alda as Arnold Vinick (seasons 6–7): a senator from California who becomes the Republican nominee for president. After his loss in the general election, he is nominated Secretary of State by President-elect Santos.
- Kristin Chenoweth as Annabeth Schott (season 7; recurring season 6): the deputy press secretary and later works on the Santos campaign. At the series end, she is appointed press secretary to the incoming First Lady.

=== Background ===
NBC originally ordered the pilot episode in March 1998 for a midseason premiere the following year, and the casting of Martin Sheen, Rob Lowe, Bradley Whitford, Allison Janney and Richard Schiff was officially reported in March 1999. NBC officially picked up the series in May 1999 for its fall schedule.

In an interview on the first season DVD, Bradley Whitford said that he was originally cast as Sam, even though Aaron Sorkin had created the Josh character specifically for him. In the same interview, Janel Moloney stated she had originally auditioned for the role of C.J. and that Donna, the role for which she was eventually cast, was not meant to be a recurring character. Other actors were seriously considered for other roles, including Alan Alda and Sidney Poitier for the President, Judd Hirsch for Leo, Eugene Levy for Toby, and CCH Pounder for C.J.

Moloney became a recurring character in Season 1 and then a regular in Season 2 due to her chemistry with Whitford's character beginning in the pilot episode, and their possible romantic relationship became an ongoing plot thread throughout the series.

Each of the principal actors made approximately $75,000 per episode, with the established Sheen receiving a confirmed salary of $300,000. Disparities in cast salaries led to very public contract disputes, particularly by Janney, Schiff, Spencer, and Whitford. During contract negotiations in 2001, the four were threatened with breach of contract suits by Warner Bros. However, by banding together, they were able to persuade the studio to more than double their salaries. Two years later, the four again demanded a doubling of their salaries, a few months after Warner Bros had signed new licensing deals with NBC and Bravo.

Sorkin's hectic writing schedule often led to cost overruns and schedule slips, and he made headlines in April 2001 with an arrest for possession of hallucinogenic mushrooms.

The New York Times reported in June 2001 that the show cost at least $2 million an episode, and that some writers would not receive planned raises in the third season.

In July 2002, it became public that Rob Lowe, who had a separate salary deal from the other main cast members, intended to leave the series toward the end of the fourth season, saying in a statement "it has been increasingly clear, for quite a while, that there was no longer a place for Sam Seaborn on 'The West Wing.'' Variety attributed his exit to salary dissatisfaction and the evolution of Martin Sheen's character to have a more primary regular role. In August 2002, Lowe suggested he could still stay if a deal could be worked out. Sorkin said in September 2002 that the exit would be written in a way that the door would always be open for Lowe's return. Lowe would later return for guest appearance roles at the end of the final season in 2006 and A West Wing Special to Benefit When We All Vote in 2020.

Joshua Malina's role as a series regular following Lowe's exit was first reported in December 2002. The teaser of the season 4 Christmas episode "Holy Night" is almost entirely in Yiddish, in part inspired by Richard Schiff's own family history.

The show was renewed for seasons 5 and 6 in January 2003 despite falling ratings.

The news of Aaron Sorkin's and Tommy Schlamme's departures at the end of season 4 was first reported at the beginning of May 2003 ahead of that year's season finale. Many sources referred to growing tensions over budgets, delayed scripts and ratings, given the fact that Sorkin wrote nearly every episode himself. Production company Warner Brothers and NBC executive Jeff Zucker stated that executive producer John Wells was set to take a "more active" role in the coming season, essentially taking over as showrunner. At the time Wells suggested that Sorkin had been convinced to stay on for previous seasons, that ratings were not a factor, and that he planned to bring in additional writing staff. Wells also stated later that conflict involving the network and the role of an actor on the series were a factor, that the timing of the exit and his takeover was the unplanned result of an end of season meeting involving the production company and the network and that he and the writing staff had to do the best they could to come up with a way to continue from the Season 4 cliffhanger finale Sorkin had written.

Jimmy Smits was cast in the show's sixth season as the congressman and future presidential candidate Matt Santos after John Wells saw his performance in the summer 2004 Central Park Shakespeare in the Park production.

The show was renewed for a seventh season in March 2005.

In the seventh and final season, many of the actors appeared in fewer episodes as the show faced budget constraints, but were still paid the same amount for the episodes they were in, according to Richard Schiff. Schiff, who has been very vocal about his unhappiness with his character's final storyline, was contracted for 11 episodes after initially being offered four episodes.

John Spencer died of a heart attack on December 16, 2005, about a year after his character experienced a nearly fatal heart attack on the show. Martin Sheen gave a brief memorial message before "Running Mates", the first new episode that aired after Spencer's death. The loss of Spencer's character was addressed beginning with the episode "Election Day", which aired on April 2, 2006.

The ending of the series was announced in January 2006, with NBC Entertainment President Kevin Reilly saying the decision had been made before John Spencer's death, citing lower ratings. The entire cast appeared on The Ellen DeGeneres Show ahead of the finale in May 2006.

High-profile guests appearing as themselves over the course of the show included James Taylor, Yo-Yo Ma, Jon Bon Jovi, Penn & Teller, Foo Fighters, The Whiffenpoofs, and characters from Sesame Street.

Interior scenes were filmed on soundstages at Warner Bros. Studios Burbank in California. The production also filmed exterior scenes on trips to the Washington, D.C. area, including at what was then the Newseum building in Rosslyn, Maryland, New York City, Pennsylvania, and in Ontario, Canada.

== Crew ==
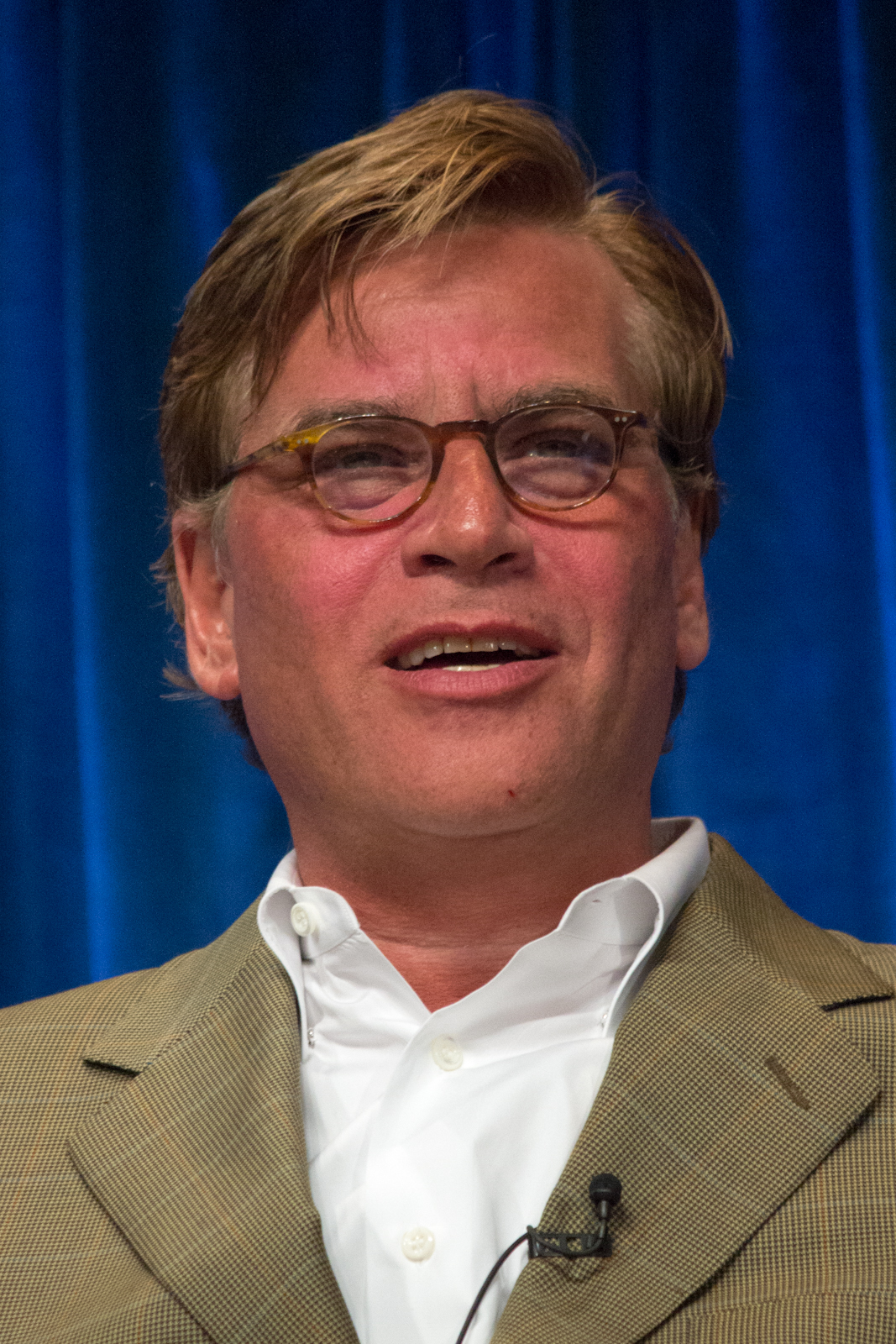
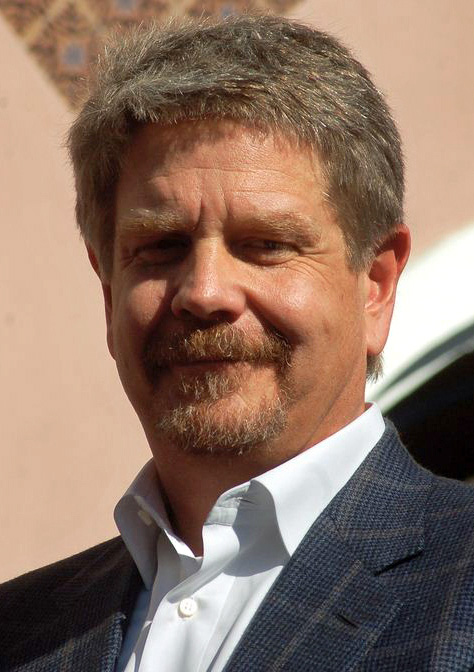
Series creator Aaron Sorkin (left) served as head writer for the first four seasons before departing. The role was assumed by executive producer John Wells (right) for subsequent seasons.

The series was created by Aaron Sorkin, who served as executive producer for the pilot episode alongside director Thomas Schlamme and John Wells. Kristin Harms and Llewellyn Wells were producers for the pilot. Michael Hissrich acted as a co-producer.

The first season proper saw the return of all of the pilot production team along with the addition of Ron Osborn and Jeff Reno as consulting producers and Rick Cleveland as a second co-producer with Robert W. Glass as an associate producer. Glass left the production team after only five episodes. Julie Herlocker joined as Associate Producer beginning with episode six. Osborn and Reno departed after nine episodes. Paul Redford served as a story editor throughout the first season. Lawrence O'Donnell worked as executive story editor for the second half of the season.

With the second season, Kevin Falls became a co-executive producer. Cleveland left the production team and Redford and O'Donnell were promoted to co-producer. Peter Parnell and Patrick Caddell became co-producers and Julie Herlocker and Mindy Kanaskie became associate producers. O'Donnell was promoted again to producer five episodes into the season and Hissrich joined him twelve episodes into the season.

The third season saw the departure of Parnell, Caddell, and Herlocker and the temporary absence of O'Donnell. Director Christopher Misiano became a supervising producer, Patrick Ward joined the series as an associate producer, and Eli Attie joined the writing staff as a staff writer. Redford was promoted to producer. With the thirteenth episode of the third season director Alex Graves became an additional supervising producer and Attie became a story editor.

The fourth season marked the temporary departure of Hissrich. Misiano and Graves became co-executive producers alongside Falls. Attie was promoted to executive story editor and Debora Cahn became a staff writer. The fourteenth episode of the season saw Redford promoted to supervising producer and Kanaskie, Ward and Attie promoted to co-producers.

The fifth season saw the departure of both Sorkin and Schlamme as executive producers. Schlamme remained attached to the series as an executive consultant. John Wells remained the sole executive producer and showrunner. Co-executive producer Kevin Falls also left the show.

O'Donnell rejoined the production team as a consulting producer. Wells also added Carol Flint, Alexa Junge, Peter Noah, and John Sacret Young as consulting producers. Andrew Stearn came aboard as a producer and Attie was promoted to producer. Cahn became story editor and Josh Singer replaced her as staff writer. With the tenth episode Flint, Junge, Noah and Sacret Young became supervising producers.

With the sixth season, Misiano and Graves were promoted to executive producers. Redford and Junge left the production team and Dylan K. Massin became a co-producer. Cahn was promoted to executive story editor and Singer replaced her as story editor. Lauren Schmidt filled the staff writer role. The fourth episode saw the departure of original crew member Llewellyn Wells. Debora Cahn was promoted to co-producer with the fourteenth episode.

The seventh season saw Noah and O'Donnell promoted again, this time becoming additional executive producers. Attie became a supervising producer. Hissrich returned to his role as producer for the final season.

== Episodes ==
Season	Episodes	Originally released	
Season	Episodes	First released	Last released
1	22	September 22, 1999	May 17, 2000
2	22	October 4, 2000	May 16, 2001
3	21	October 10, 2001	May 22, 2002
4	23	September 25, 2002	May 14, 2003
5	22	September 24, 2003	May 19, 2004
6	22	October 20, 2004	April 6, 2005
7	22	September 25, 2005	May 14, 2006

Multiple story arcs on The West Wing span several episodes and entire seasons. In addition to these long-running narratives, each episode contains smaller storylines that usually begin and end within a single episode.

Most episodes follow President Bartlet and his staff through particular legislative or political issues. Plots can range from behind-closed-doors negotiating with Congress to personal problems like post-traumatic stress disorder, from which Josh suffers during the second season. The typical episode loosely follows the President and his staff through their day, generally following several plots connected by some idea or theme. A large, fully connected set of the White House allowed the producers to create shots with very few cuts and long, continuous master shots of staff members conversing as they walk through the hallways. These "walk and talks" became a trademark of the show. The final two seasons presented a narrative change, with the focus of the show divided between plots in the West Wing with President Bartlet and his remaining senior staffers and plots revolving around the rest of the main cast on the campaign trail for the 2006 election.

- In the first season, the Bartlet administration is in its second year and is still having trouble settling in and making progress on legislative issues.
- The second season covers the aftermath of a shooting at Rosslyn, the midterm elections of the first Bartlet term, and dealings with a new Congress and sees scandal when the White House is rocked by allegations of criminal conduct and the President must decide whether he will run for a second term.
- The third and fourth seasons take an in-depth look at the campaign trail and the specter of both foreign and domestic terrorism.
- In the fifth season, the President begins to encounter more issues on the foreign front, while at home he faces off with the newly elected Speaker of the House, battles controversy over Supreme Court appointments and oversees a daring plan to save Social Security.
- The sixth season chronicles the quest to replace President Bartlet in the next election, following the primary campaigns of several candidates from both parties, while the President himself attempts to build his legacy but finds his ability to govern compromised by his illness.
- In the seventh season, the President must face a leak of confidential information about a secret Department of Defense program from inside the White House, while the Democratic and Republican candidates battle to succeed him in the general election.

== Development ==
The series was developed following the success of the 1995 theatrical film The American President, for which Aaron Sorkin wrote the screenplay, and in which Martin Sheen played the White House Chief of Staff. Unused plot elements from the film and a suggestion from Akiva Goldsman inspired Sorkin to create The West Wing. Sorkin said that the airing of the show was delayed for about a year due to the Clinton–Lewinsky scandal. Around the same time, a completely separate series called West Wing was under development for Lifetime by a former White House staffer about a White House press secretary with a college friend working as a TV news correspondent, with future The West Wing guest star Annabeth Gish attached to star, but it was not picked up to series.

According to the DVD commentary, Sorkin intended to center the show on Sam Seaborn and the other senior staff with the President in an unseen or a secondary role. However, Bartlet's screen time gradually increased, and his role expanded as the series progressed. Positive critical and public reaction to Sheen's performance raised his character's profile, decreasing Lowe's perceived significance. In addition, the storylines began to focus less on Sam and more on Josh Lyman, the Deputy Chief of Staff. This shift was one of the reasons for Lowe's eventual departure from the show in the fourth season.

For the first four seasons, drawing on research materials, scene drafts, and occasionally entire draft scripts from his writing staff, Sorkin wrote almost every episode of the series, occasionally reusing plot elements, episode titles, character names, and actors from his previous work, Sports Night, a sitcom on which he began to develop his signature dialogue style of rhythmic, snappy, and intellectual banter. Fellow executive producer and director Thomas Schlamme championed the walk and talk, a continuous shot tracking in front of the characters as they walk from one place to another that became part of The West Wing's signature visual style.

The West Wing aired on Wednesdays at 9:00 pm ET from its debut until the end of its sixth season. NBC elected to move the series to Sundays at 8:00 pm for its seventh season, a move universally regarded as the beginning of the series' end (since NBC and the NFL had reached a deal for Sunday Night Football to return to the network in the fall of 2006), and the series finale aired on May 14, 2006. The West Wing took a large ratings hit with the move, which put it up against ABC's Top 20 hit Extreme Makeover: Home Edition, and CBS's Top 30 hit Cold Case in its timeslot.

== Legacy and influence ==
The show's legitimacy, political slant, and idealist representations of Washington, as well as its notable writing and film merits, have generated considerable discussion.

In 2011, The New York Times reported the then-fledgling government of Myanmar used DVDs of The West Wing episodes to study democracy. This was corroborated by Secretary of State Hillary Clinton the following year.

In March 2014, cast members Bradley Whitford, Janel Moloney and Richard Schiff participated in a Harvard Institute of Politics event with show writer and MSNBC host Lawrence O'Donnell to discuss the impact of the show. The following month, Whitford and Schiff also participated in a discussion with writer Eli Attie at the University of Chicago Institute of Politics.

Lin-Manuel Miranda has cited the series as a significant influence on the creation of his musical Hamilton.

In 2016, Sorkin and the cast reunited to mark the 10th anniversary of the show's finale at the ATX Festival. In 2021, cast members reunited virtually as part of the Stars in the House series.

In 2022, several cast members participated in a virtual roundtable on mental health organized by the United States Department of Health and Human Services during the Biden administration.

In 2024, the Paley Center for Media in New York hosted an exhibition marking the 25th anniversary of the show's premiere, which cast member Janel Moloney wrote about attending. Sorkin had previously marked the show's 20th anniversary at a Paley panel in New York in 2019 following a screening of episode "Two Cathedrals", while both Sorkin and cast members previously participated in a Paley panel in Los Angeles in 2000 with a screening of the episode "In Excelsis Deo".

In September 2024, cast members also reunited to mark the 25th anniversary in an appearance at the 76th Primetime Emmy Awards to stress the importance of voting and announce the winner for Outstanding Drama Series. Later that week, cast members and producers were invited to the White House where they met President Joe Biden before participating in an outdoor anniversary celebration with First Lady Jill Biden. In his remarks, Sorkin referred to Biden's decision not to run for reelection on July 21, 2024, as a "West Wing moment." Before the news about Biden had broken that day, Sorkin had written an op-ed in The New York Times comparing Bartlet's decision to run for reelection to Biden's dilemma, and suggested the Democrats could nominate Mitt Romney. But after the news about Biden's decision and endorsement of Kamala Harris became public later that day, he communicated via cast member Joshua Malina's social media profiles: "I take it all back. Harris for America!"

Afterwards Sorkin said the White House visit had given him ideas for new episodes in a hypothetical revival of the series. In 2025, John Wells said he had discussed revivals with Sorkin, but that he wasn't sure it would work as a "centrist" show in the modern political climate.

In December 2024, cast members Richard Schiff, Karim Dulé Hill and Melissa Fitzgerald attended an event marking the 20th anniversary of the Clinton Presidential Center.

Cast members have individually become active and jointly reunited in person and virtually to support several candidates and organizations associated with the Democratic Party, in some cases through fundraising emails or as part of campaign ads and fundraisers, including Joe Biden's 2008 primary campaign, the 2008 Barack Obama campaign, the 2012 Barack Obama campaign, Ohio Senator Sherrod Brown's 2012 campaign, the 2014 Democratic Party of Wisconsin campaign in support of Mary Burke, the 2016 Hillary Clinton campaign, the 2020 Joe Biden campaign, and the Wisconsin Democrats 2022 Midterms campaign. In 2024, they supported the organization Red Wine & Blue, Pennsylvania senator Bob Casey Jr., Ohio Senator Sherrod Brown, and the 2024 Kamala Harris campaign.

=== Realism ===
While The West Wing is not completely accurate in its portrayal of the actual West Wing, former White House staffers and journalists have described the show as capturing its feel. President Gerald Ford's daughter Susan made the comment "I can't watch [the show]. They turn left and right where you are not supposed to." Some West Wing veterans have said it exaggerates the formality and volume of chatter in the West Wing, under-represents the number of people involved in a decision, and over-idealizes its occupants.

Former Senate aide Lawrence O'Donnell and former White House aide and presidential campaign speechwriter Eli Attie were both longtime writers on the show (O'Donnell for seasons 1–2 and 5–7, Attie for seasons 3–7). Former White House Press Secretaries Dee Dee Myers and Marlin Fitzwater and pollsters Patrick Caddell and Frank Luntz also served as consultants, advising the writing staff for part of the show's run. Other former White House staffers, such as Peggy Noonan and Gene Sperling, served as consultants for brief periods.

A documentary special in the third season compared the show's depiction of the West Wing to the real thing. Many former West Wing denizens applauded the show's depiction of the West Wing, including advisor David Gergen, Secretary of State Henry Kissinger, Chief of Staff Leon Panetta, Deputy Chief of Staff Karl Rove, and former Presidents Gerald Ford, Jimmy Carter, and Bill Clinton.

While critics often praised The West Wing for its writing, others faulted the show as unrealistically optimistic and sentimental. A large part of this criticism came from the perceived naiveté of the characters. Television critic Heather Havrilesky asked, "What rock did these morally pure creatures crawl out from under and, more important, how do you go from innocent millipede to White House staffer without becoming soiled or disillusioned by the dirty realities of politics along the way?"

=== Social influence ===
Sorkin said, "our responsibility is to captivate you for however long we've asked for your attention."

Former White House aide Matthew Miller noted that Sorkin "captivates viewers by making the human side of politics more real than life—or at least more real than the picture we get from the news." Miller also noted that by portraying politicians with empathy, the show created a "subversive competitor" to the cynical views of politics in media. In the essay "The West Wing and the West Wing", author Myron Levine agreed, stating that the series "presents an essentially positive view of public service and a healthy corrective to anti-Washington stereotypes and public cynicism."

Dr. Staci L. Beavers, associate professor of political science at California State University, San Marcos, wrote a short essay, "The West Wing as a Pedagogical Tool". She concluded, "While the series' purpose is for-profit entertainment, The West Wing presents great pedagogical potential." However, she noted that the merits of a particular argument may be obscured by the viewer's opinion of the character. Beavers also noted that characters with opposing viewpoints were often set up to be "bad people" in the viewer's eyes. These characters were assigned undesirable characteristics having nothing to do with their political opinions, such as being romantically involved with a main character's love interest.

While it aired, The West Wing offered viewers an idealist liberal administration that provided a sort of catharsis to those on the left who felt that their political beliefs were largely forgotten or ignored in the era of the Bush administration. Writer Hédi Kaddour remarked that The West Wing "show[ed] what [liberals] would have liked to have seen and had: a different American administration, closer to our desires as people more or less on the left."

On January 31, 2006, The West Wing was said to have played a hand in defeating a proposal backed by Tony Blair's government in the British House of Commons, during the so-called "West Wing Plot". The plan was allegedly hatched after a Conservative Member of Parliament watched the episode "A Good Day", in which Democrats block a bill aimed at limiting stem cell research, by appearing to have left Washington D.C. but actually hiding in a congressional office until the Republican Speaker calls the vote.

A promotional video for the White House's 2015 Virtual "Big Block of Cheese Day", featuring cast of The West Wing

A number of episodes referred to a practice of the administration having one day each year on which they accepted meetings with people or groups who would not normally receive an audience with high-level White House staffers, referring to the event as "Big Block of Cheese Day". The name came from the fact that President Andrew Jackson had a large wheel of cheese placed in the White House from which the public were invited to eat during a reception, while discussing issues of the day with politicians.

In 2014, the White House announced that it was to host an online Q&A with Obama administration officials and staff, called a Virtual "Big Block of Cheese day", on January 29, 2014. The event was promoted with a video featuring stars from The West Wing. The event was repeated on January 21, 2015, again promoted by stars from the show.

On April 29, 2016, Allison Janney appeared in character as C.J. Cregg during a White House press briefing to call attention to the issue of substance abuse.

=== Partisan criticism ===
Despite its commercial and critical success, The West Wing has also received criticism from the right. Jewish Journal columnist Naomi Pfefferman once referred to The West Wing as "The Left Wing" because of its portrayal of an ideal liberal administration, and the moniker has also been used by Republican critics of the show. Chris Lehmann, former deputy editor and regular reviewer for The Washington Post's Book World section, characterized the show as a revisionist look at the Clinton presidency.

However, criticism of the show has been made from the left as well. Cultural critic and Jacobin columnist Luke Savage has taken issue with the show's portrayal of "technocratic governance" as "exciting, intellectually stimulating, and, above all, honorable", and its attendant liberal elitism, saying, "there is a general tenor to The West Wing universe that cannot be called anything other than smug." The hosts of socialist podcast Chapo Trap House are frequent critics of Sorkin and have called The West Wing an "expression of the patronizing self-entitlement of liberals."

On the other hand, some Republicans have admired the show since its inception, even before the departure of Sorkin and the show's resulting shift toward the center. In his 2001 article "Real Liberals versus The West Wing," Mackubin Thomas Owens wrote, ″Although his administration is reliably liberal, President Bartlet possesses virtues even a conservative could admire. He obeys the Constitution and the law. He is devoted to his wife and daughters. Being unfaithful to his wife would never cross his mind. He is no wimp when it comes to foreign policy—no quid pro quo for him."

Journalist Matthew Miller wrote, "Although the show indeed has a liberal bias on issues, it presents a truer, more human picture of the people behind the headlines than most of today's Washington journalists."

=== Filming techniques and reactions ===
Sam Seaborn and Josh Lyman converse in the hallway in one of The West Wing's noted tracking shots.

In its first season, The West Wing attracted critical attention in the television community with a record nine Emmy wins. The show has been praised for its high production values and repeatedly recognized for its cinematic achievements. The series has also been praised for Sorkin's rapid-fire and witty scripts. The series had a budget of $2.7 million per episode.

The West Wing is noted for developing the "walk-and-talk"—long Steadicam tracking shots showing characters walking down hallways while involved in long conversations. In a typical "walk-and-talk" shot, the camera leads two characters down a hallway as they speak to each other. One of these characters generally breaks off and the remaining character is then joined by another character, who initiates another conversation as they continue walking. These "walk-and-talks" create a dynamic feel for what would otherwise be long expository dialogue, and have become a staple for dialogue-intensive television show scenes.

=== Awards ===
In its first season, The West Wing garnered nine Emmys, a record for most won by a series in its first season. In addition, the series received the Emmy Award for Outstanding Drama Series in 2000, 2001, 2002, and 2003, tying Hill Street Blues, L.A. Law, Mad Men and Game of Thrones for most won in this category. Each of its seven seasons earned a nomination for the award. With its 26 total awards, The West Wing tied with Hill Street Blues as the drama with the most Emmy wins until Game of Thrones broke the record for most wins in 2016, with 38 total awards.

The series shares the Emmy Award record for most acting nominations by regular cast members (excluding the guest performer category) for a single series in one year. (Hill Street Blues, L.A. Law, Game of Thrones, Succession and The White Lotus also hold that record). For the 2001–2002 season, nine cast members were nominated for Emmys. Allison Janney, John Spencer and Stockard Channing each won an Emmy (for Lead Actress, Supporting Actor and Supporting Actress respectively). The others nominated were Martin Sheen (for Lead Actor), Richard Schiff, Karim Dulé Hill and Bradley Whitford (for Supporting Actor), and Janel Moloney and Mary-Louise Parker (for Supporting Actress). In addition, that same year Mark Harmon, Tim Matheson and Ron Silver were each nominated in the Guest Actor category (although none won the award). This gave the series an Emmy Award record for most acting nominations overall (including guest performer category) in a single year, with 12 acting nominations.

Twenty individual Emmys were awarded to writers, actors, and crew members. Allison Janney is the record holder for most wins by a cast member, with a total of four Emmys. The West Wing won at least one Emmy in each of its seasons except the sixth.

In addition to its Emmys, the show won two Screen Actors Guild (SAG) Awards, in 2000 and 2001, Outstanding Performance by an Ensemble in a Drama Series. Martin Sheen was the only cast member to win a Golden Globe Award, and he and Allison Janney were the only cast members to win SAG Awards. In both 1999 and 2000, The West Wing was awarded the Peabody Award for excellence in broadcasting.

The following table summarizes award wins by cast members:

Actor	Awards won
Alan Alda	Emmy Award, Outstanding Supporting Actor in a Drama Series (2006)
Stockard Channing	Emmy Award, Outstanding Supporting Actress in a Drama Series (2002)
Allison Janney	Emmy Award, Outstanding Supporting Actress in a Drama Series (2000, 2001)
Allison Janney	Emmy Award, Outstanding Lead Actress in a Drama Series (2002, 2004)
Allison Janney	Screen Actors Guild Award, Outstanding Performance by a Female Actor in a Drama Series (2000, 2001)
Richard Schiff	Emmy Award, Outstanding Supporting Actor in a Drama Series (2000)
Martin Sheen	Golden Globe Award, Best Actor in a TV-Series – Drama (2001)
Martin Sheen	Screen Actors Guild Award, Outstanding Performance by a Male Actor in a Drama Series (2000, 2001)
John Spencer	Emmy Award, Outstanding Supporting Actor in a Drama Series (2002)
Bradley Whitford	Emmy Award, Outstanding Supporting Actor in a Drama Series (2001)

Many cast members were Emmy-nominated for their work on The West Wing but did not win, including Martin Sheen—who was nominated for six of the seven seasons of the series without receiving the award—as well as Janel Moloney, who was nominated twice, and Karim Dulé Hill, Rob Lowe, and Mary-Louise Parker, who were all nominated once. Matthew Perry, Oliver Platt, Ron Silver, Tim Matheson, and Mark Harmon also received Emmy nominations for guest starring on the show.

Thomas Schlamme won two Emmys for Outstanding Directing for a Drama Series (in 2000 and 2001), and Christopher Misiano won an Emmy for Outstanding Directing for a Drama Series in 2003. The West Wing's only Emmy for Outstanding Writing for a Drama Series was in its first season, when Rick Cleveland and Aaron Sorkin shared the award for "In Excelsis Deo".

W. G. Snuffy Walden received an Emmy Award for Outstanding Main Title Theme Music in 2000 for "The West Wing Opening Theme".

"The West Wing Documentary Special" won an Emmy Award for Outstanding Special Class Program in 2002, with the award shared by Aaron Sorkin, Tommy Schlamme, documentarian Bill Couturie, show writers Eli Attie and Felicia Willson, and others.

Readers of TV Guide voted the cast of The West Wing their Best Drama cast of all time in 2011, receiving 37% of the votes, beating Lost, which received 23%.

A Wall Street Journal poll in 2016 named Martin Sheen's Josiah Bartlet as the second greatest fictional president, behind Harrison Ford's President James Marshall in Air Force One.

=== Critical reception ===
On review aggregator website Metacritic, the first season has a score of 79 out of 100, based on 23 critics indicating "generally favorable" reviews. On review aggregator website Rotten Tomatoes, the first season has a 96% approval rating with an average score of 8.4/10 based on 47 reviews, with a critics consensus of: "Practically a screwball comedy with Aaron Sorkin's rat-a-tat dialogue and the ensemble's wonderful chemistry, The West Wing resplendently renders every voter's dearest fantasy: competent politicians with good intentions."

The second season has an 88% approval rating with an average score of 10/10 based on 24 reviews, with a critics consensus of: "The West Wing's approval rating remains high and the state of its union strong in a sophomore season that puts President Bartlet to the test and brings out the very best in Martin Sheen's performance."

In 2001, Aaron Sorkin began responding in online posts to critical recaps and fan posts on the precursor to the website Television Without Pity under the username "Benjamin" and also addressed a dispute with former writer Rick Cleveland about the writing of the episode In Excelsis Deo. Critics later saw the experience as inspiration for the storyline with a negative portrayal of an online forum called "LemonLyman.com" in the 2002 third-season episode "The U.S. Poet Laureate."

The third season has a 73% approval rating with an average score of 10/10 based on 15 reviews, with a critics consensus of: "The West Wing still fires off repartee as if sparkling dialogue were mandated by executive order, but this underwhelming third season finds the series' idealism curdling a bit into smug self-satisfaction.

The fourth season has a 92% approval rating with an average score of 8/10 based on 13 reviews, with a critics consensus of: "The pressure of re-election reinvigorates both the Bartlet administration and The West Wing itself in a comeback season that'll leave viewers rooting for four more years."

The fifth season has a 65% approval rating with an average score of 7.9/10 based on 23 reviews, with a critics consensus of: "John Wells admirably tries to maintain the spirit of Aaron Sorkin's vision after succeeding him, but The West Wing's fifth season is a decidedly rocky changing of the guard." The sixth season has a 64% approval rating with an average score of 9.4/10 based on 14 reviews, with a critics consensus of: "The West Wing is firmly in its lame duck session, a little more cynical and rudderless than before, but the introduction of new presidential hopefuls brings a much-needed promise of fresh blood." The seventh season has a 95% approval rating with an average score of 8.5/10 based on 20 reviews, with a critics consensus of: "Bidding a fond farewell to the Bartlet administration, The West Wing regains its idealistic thrill with a sweetly amicable presidential election in this strong final season."

In 2023, Rotten Tomatoes critics ranked it at number 20 in a ranking of the "Best TV Shows of the Last 25 Years."

In marking the show's anniversary in 2024, Vulture ranked all episodes of the series, with the season 2 finale "Two Cathedrals" taking the top spot of 150 episodes. The same episode was also ranked as the best episode of the series by The Daily Beast, TV Insider, Screen Rant and Paste. The Ringer also named the episode at number 12 in a ranking of the "100 Best TV Episodes of the Century." Variety ranked the same episode as number one of the top 25 episodes, and ranked the show as number 25 in a ranking of the "100 Best TV Shows of All Time." Gold Derby ranked season 2 episode "Noël" as the top episode in its ranking of the show's 20 greatest episodes. The show was ranked at number eleven in a listing of Hollywood's 100 favorite TV shows from The Hollywood Reporter and a listing of the 50 top TV dramas from The Guardian, and at number 46 in a Rolling Stone ranking of the "Best TV Shows of all Time." The evolution of the relationship between Josh and Donna has been noted as a typical long-running TV "will they/won't they" romantic relationship, though was also viewed more critically by some in retrospect.

== Nielsen ratings ==
Season	Episodes	Timeslot	Season premiere	Season finale	TV season	Ranking	Viewers (in millions)
1	22	Wednesday 9:00 pm	September 22, 1999	May 17, 2000	1999–2000	#27	13.0
2	22	Wednesday 9:00 pm	October 4, 2000	May 16, 2001	2000–01	#13	17.0
3	21	Wednesday 9:00 pm	October 3, 2001	May 22, 2002	2001–02	#10	17.2
4	23	Wednesday 9:00 pm	September 25, 2002	May 14, 2003	2002–03	#22	13.5
5	22	Wednesday 9:00 pm	September 24, 2003	May 19, 2004	2003–04	#29	11.8
6	22	Wednesday 9:00 pm	October 20, 2004	April 6, 2005	2004–05	#35	11.1
7	22	Sunday 8:00 pm	September 25, 2005	May 14, 2006	2005–06	#65	8.1

The West Wing : U.S. viewers per episode (millions)

Season	Episode number																						
Season	1	2	3	4	5	6	7	8	9	10	11	12	13	14	15	16	17	18	19	20	21	22	23
1	16.91	13.71	14.41	12.32	12.41	13.37	13.66	12.92	12.37	14.23	13.65	13.96	14.92	14.18	13.48	12.41	15.76	14.24	13.97	12.89	14.33	13.30	–
2	25.05	25.05	16.80	17.12	18.47	18.49	18.47	17.49	18.99	18.28	17.66	18.02	18.20	18.40	16.43	18.09	17.17	16.56	16.78	16.62	17.01	20.72	–
3	23.65	20.79	21.47	17.78	19.48	19.89	16.73	20.86	18.42	18.38	19.05	19.12	18.14	16.36	19.49	16.95	17.26	17.40	17.26	15.54	16.64	–	
4	18.16	18.16	16.70	15.99	15.91	15.73	16.22	15.79	15.03	14.28	15.39	13.96	14.45	13.03	13.59	12.23	14.01	11.70	12.72	13.65	13.18	13.37	13.79
5	18.33	16.33	13.43	12.06	13.13	12.48	12.42	13.49	12.77	13.28	11.86	10.84	11.64	11.43	11.21	11.43	10.76	10.95	11.11	11.94	10.76	11.03	–
6	12.27	11.86	13.82	15.26	12.41	11.76	13.28	12.33	12.53	11.74	11.88	10.92	10.69	9.62	10.17	9.93	10.66	10.10	9.75	8.96	9.88	11.62	–
7	8.90	7.66	7.95	8.07	7.85	8.51	9.58	7.26	8.13	7.40	6.36	7.71	7.02	8.07	7.93	7.27	8.39	8.29	8.42	8.34	7.94	10.11	–

Audience measurement performed by Nielsen Media Research

== Exploration of real world issues ==
The West Wing often featured extensive discussion of current or recent political issues. After the real-world election of Republican President George W. Bush in 2000, many wondered whether the liberal show could retain its relevance and topicality. However, by exploring many of the same issues facing the Bush administration from a Democratic point of view, the show continued to appeal to a broad audience of both Democrats and Republicans.

In the second-season episode "The Midterms", President Bartlet admonishes fictional radio host Dr. Jenna Jacobs for her views regarding homosexuality at a private gathering at the White House. Dr. Jacobs is a caricature of radio personality Dr. Laura Schlessinger, who strongly disapproves of homosexuality. Many of the President's biblical references in his comments to Dr. Jacobs appear to have come from an open letter to Dr. Schlessinger, circulated online in early May 2000. A few episodes later in that season, a blackboard in Josh Lyman's office had a reference to Bill de Blasio, known at the time as the campaign manager for Hillary Clinton's senatorial candidacy.

The Bartlet administration experiences a scandal during the second and third seasons that has been compared to the Monica Lewinsky affair. President Bartlet has known that he has relapsing-remitting multiple sclerosis (MS) since 1992. The scandal centers on President Bartlet's nondisclosure of his illness to the electorate during the election. He is investigated by an opposition Congress for defrauding the public and eventually accepts congressional censure. Multiple sclerosis advocacy groups praised the show for its accurate portrayal of the symptoms of MS and stressing that it is not fatal. The National MS Society commented:

For the first time on national television or even in film, the public encountered a lead character with both an MS diagnosis and the hope for a continued productive life. Because [The] West Wing is a fictional drama and not a medical documentary, writers could have greatly distorted MS facts to further their storyline [but did not].

— Gail Kerr, National MS Society

Following the September 11, 2001, attacks, the start of the third season was postponed for a week, as were most American television premieres that year. A script for a special episode was quickly written and began filming on September 21. The episode "Isaac and Ishmael" aired on October 3 and addresses the sobering reality of terrorism in America and the wider world, albeit with no specific reference to September 11. While "Isaac and Ishmael" received mixed critical reviews, it illustrated the show's flexibility in addressing current events. The cast of the show state during the opening of the episode that it is not part of The West Wing continuity.

A 2003 plot twist has House Speaker Glen Allen Walken (John Goodman) become Acting President when Zoey Bartlet is kidnapped.

While the September 11 attacks are not referred to in The West Wing continuity, the country enters into a variation of the war on terrorism. Al Qaeda, mentioned briefly by Nancy McNally in the beginning of season 2, plays no role in the longer terrorism story arcs of seasons 3, 4 and 5. It is only mentioned again in seasons 6 and 7. The stand-in used instead is the fictional Bahji terror group who first plots to blow up the Golden Gate Bridge. In response, the President orders the assassination of foreign leader Abdul ibn Shareef, one of Bahji's primary backers. This storyline has similarities to the real-world US invasion of Afghanistan as well as US relations with Saudi Arabia since it brings the Middle East to the forefront of US foreign relations and elevates terrorism as a serious threat.

In a 2001 episode, Sam Seaborn discusses arguments in favor of abolishing the penny.

In the middle of the fourth season, Bartlet's White House is confronted with genocide in the fictional African country of Equatorial Kundu, which was compared to the Rwandan genocide of 1994. The result is new foreign policy doctrine for the Bartlet administration and military intervention to stop the violence, which come after much hesitation and reluctance to call the conflict a genocide. In reality, the Clinton administration did not intervene in Rwanda.

In 2004, then New York Senator Hillary Clinton and then New York Rep. John M. McHugh wrote a letter addressed to Josh Lyman criticizing him after he had suggested the closure of a Fort Drum base in upstate New York on the fifth-season episode "Full Disclosure", but also thanking his colleague for trying to "save Social Security" in a previous episode. Richard Schiff also recalled receiving a letter from Hillary Clinton after that earlier episode outlining all the ways the Social Security plan Toby Ziegler was advocating for in the episode would not work.

In the sixth and seventh seasons, The West Wing explores a leak of top-secret information by a senior staffer at the White House. This leak has been compared to events surrounding the Valerie Plame affair. In the storyline, the International Space Station is damaged and can no longer produce oxygen for the astronauts to breathe. With no other methods of rescue available, the President is reminded of the existence of a top-secret military space shuttle. Following the President's inaction, the shuttle story is leaked to a White House reporter, Greg Brock (analogous to Judith Miller), who prints the story in The New York Times. Brock will not reveal his source and goes to jail for failing to do so, as did Miller. In order to stop the investigation, in which authorities suspect Chief of Staff C.J. Cregg, Toby Ziegler admits to leaking the information, and the President is forced to dismiss him.

In comparison, the Plame affair resulted in the arrest and conviction of "Scooter" Libby, the Vice President's chief of staff. However, Libby was convicted of perjury in testimony to a grand jury. No one was convicted for "blowing the cover" of Plame. (Richard Armitage, an official in the Bush State Department, acknowledged leaking information about Plame to reporters but was never charged with a crime.) Libby's two-and-a-half-year prison sentence was later commuted by President Bush, though the other facet of his sentence ($250,000 fine) stood until his 2018 pardon by President Donald Trump and was duly paid. In the series finale, President Bartlet, as his last official act, pardons Ziegler.

Other issues explored in The West Wing include:

- North Korean and Iranian nuclear ambitions
- Strained relations and a state of brinkmanship between India and Pakistan
- Legislation of the Central American Free Trade Agreement
- The formation of the Minuteman Project
- Peacemaking and terrorism in Israel and Palestine
- The genocide in Darfur, Sudan
- AIDS in Sub-Saharan Africa
- The Northern Ireland peace process
- The war on drugs and conflict in Colombia
- Controversy over Intelligent design in schools
- Brinkmanship and potential conflict between the People's Republic of China and Republic of China over Taiwan's political status
- A federal government shutdown
- The 1996 Defense of Marriage Act
- Anthrax attacks against the Bush administration
- Federal funding for the arts
- Peak oil and the consequences of a decline in global oil production
- Federal subsidies for ethanol fuel given to corn growers
- Student loan forgiveness for teachers
- Invoking the 25th Amendment for an Acting President while the President is preoccupied with personal problems

== The West Wing universe ==
=== Domestic ===
All contemporary domestic government officials in The West Wing universe are fictional. President Bartlet has made three appointments to the fictional Supreme Court and maintains a full cabinet, although not all names and terms of the members are revealed. Some cabinet members, such as the Secretary of Defense, appear more often than others. Many other government officials, such as mayors, governors, judges, representatives, and senators, are mentioned and seen as well.

Fictional locations inside the United States are created to loosely represent certain places:

==== San Andreo ====
San Andreo is a fictional California city. It is located near San Diego, has a population of 42,000 and is the location of the San Andreo Nuclear Generating Station. The fictional station was based on the real-life San Onofre Nuclear Generating Station in San Diego County.

A near meltdown at the nuclear plant becomes the focus of an October surprise for Republican nominee Senator Arnold Vinick during the 2006 presidential election, due to Vinick's strong pro-nuclear stance and revelations of his active lobbying for the construction of the plant. This is seen to be a key factor in Vinick's narrow defeat in the election by Democratic nominee Congressman Matt Santos.

==== Hartsfield's Landing ====
Hartsfield's Landing is a fictional town in New Hampshire. It is stated to be a very small community of only 63 people, of whom 42 are registered voters, that votes at one minute past midnight on the day of the New Hampshire primary, hours before the rest of the state, and has accurately predicted the winner of every presidential election since William Howard Taft in 1908. It is based on three real-life New Hampshire communities, one of which is Hart's Location, which indeed vote before the rest of the state during the primaries.

==== Kennison State University ====
Kennison State is a fictional university in Cedar Rapids, Iowa, used as the setting of a bombing in the beginning of the fourth season.

=== Foreign ===
While several real-world leaders exist in the show's universe, most foreign countries depicted or referred to on the show have fictional rulers. Real people mentioned on The West Wing include Muammar Gaddafi, Yasser Arafat, Fidel Castro, Queen Elizabeth II, King Bhumibol Adulyadej, King Carl XVI Gustaf, Thabo Mbeki, and Osama bin Laden.

Entire countries are invented as composite pictures that epitomize many of the problems that plague real nations in certain areas of the world:

- Qumar is a fictional, oil-rich, powerful, Middle Eastern state. A former British protectorate now ruled by a sultan and his family, it hosts a major US airbase and is frequently a source of trouble for the Bartlet administration. The nation is first introduced in the third season as a close ally of the United States but is criticized for its harsh treatment of women. After the September 11 attacks, it became a major venue for the show's terrorism subplots, including one where convincing evidence is discovered that Qumari Defense Minister Shareef is planning terrorist acts against U.S. infrastructure, including a failed conspiracy to destroy the Golden Gate Bridge, and President Bartlet authorizes his assassination by a covert operations team. Geographically, as it is depicted on maps, it roughly corresponds to the Hormozgan Province of Iran.
- Equatorial Kundu is a fictional African nation introduced early in the second season as one blighted by a rife AIDS epidemic, a coup d'état, and an ensuing civil war, resembling the 1994 Rwandan genocide. Its location, when depicted on maps, is roughly that of Equatorial Guinea. President Bartlet launches a military intervention in Equatorial Kundu during the fourth season in order to put an end to ethnic cleansing. Equatorial Kundu is also used during the third season of Sorkin's later television series The Newsroom.

=== Fictional timeline ===
The West Wing universe diverges from history after Richard Nixon's presidency, although there is occasional overlap; for instance, in the second episode of the series' second season "In the Shadow of Two Gunmen" Toby Ziegler speaks to a Secret Service agent outside a building named for Ronald Reagan, although this may have just been a production oversight. Fictional Presidents who are shown to have served between Nixon and Bartlet include one-term Democrat D. Wire Newman (James Cromwell) and two-term Republican Owen Lassiter.

Leo McGarry is mentioned as being Labor Secretary in the administration that was in office in 1993 and 1995. In the first season, an outgoing Supreme Court Justice tells Bartlet that he had been wanting to retire for five years but waited "for a Democrat" because he did not want a Republican president to replace him with a conservative justice (the Justice then snidely tells President Bartlet, "Instead, I got you."). The season 4 episode "Debate Camp" features a flashback to the days just before Bartlet's inauguration, as Donna Moss meets with her Republican predecessor, Jeff Johnson. In season six Leo says that the Republicans have been "out of power for eight years", and Republicans at their convention say "eight (years) is enough".

The passage of time on the show relative to that of the real world is somewhat ambiguous when marked by events of shorter duration (such as votes and campaigns). Sorkin noted in a DVD commentary track for the second-season episode "18th and Potomac" that he tried to avoid tying The West Wing to a specific period of time. Despite this, real years are occasionally mentioned, usually in the context of elections and President Bartlet's two-term administration.

The show's presidential elections are held in 2002 and 2006, which are the years of the midterm elections in reality (these dates come from the fact that in the season 2 episode "17 People", Toby mentions 2002 as the year of the President's reelection campaign). The election time line on The West Wing matches up with that of the real world until early in the sixth season, when it appears that a year is lost. For example, the filing deadline for the New Hampshire primary, which would normally fall in January 2006, appears in an episode airing in January 2005.

In an interview, John Wells stated that the series began one and a half years into Bartlet's first term and that the election to replace Bartlet was being held at the correct time. However, the season 1 episode "He Shall from Time to Time" shows the preparations for Bartlet's first regular State of the Union address, which would occur one year into his presidency. In the season 1 episode "Let Bartlet Be Bartlet", Josh Lyman asks Toby Ziegler, "Our second year isn't going much better than our first year, is it?"

In the season 5 episode "Access", it is mentioned that the Casey Creek crisis occurred during Bartlet's first term and got his presidency off to a calamitous start, and network footage of the crisis carries the date of November 2001.

=== 1998 presidential election ===
Bartlet's first campaign for president is never significantly explored in the series. Bartlet is stated to have won the election with 48% of the popular vote, 48 million votes, and a 303–235 margin in the Electoral College. Of three debates between Bartlet and his Republican opponent, it is mentioned that Bartlet won the third and final debate, held eight days before election day in St. Louis, Missouri. Josh Lyman says that in the days prior to the election, "Bartlet punched through a few walls" since the result seemed too close to call before the result broke his way. Leo McGarry says the same thing in "Bartlet for America" when he says, "It was eight days to go, and we were too close to call".

The campaign for the Democratic nomination is extensively addressed. In the episodes "In the Shadow of Two Gunmen, Part I", "In the Shadow of Two Gunmen, Part II", and "Bartlet for America", flashbacks are used to show Bartlet defeating Texas Senator John Hoynes (Tim Matheson) and Washington Senator William Wiley for the Democratic nomination and later choosing Hoynes as his running mate. The flashbacks also show Leo McGarry persuading Bartlet, then Governor of New Hampshire, to run for president.

=== 2002 presidential election ===
The West Wing's 2002 presidential election pits Bartlet and Vice President John Hoynes against Florida Governor Robert Ritchie (James Brolin) and his running mate, Jeff Heston. Bartlet faces no known opposition for renomination, though Minnesota Democratic Senator Howard Stackhouse launches a brief independent campaign for the presidency. Ritchie, not originally expected to contend for the nomination, emerges from a field of seven other Republican candidates by appealing to the party's conservative base with simple, "homey" sound bites.

Bartlet's staff contemplates replacing Vice President John Hoynes on the ticket with Chairman of the Joint Chiefs of Staff Admiral Percy Fitzwallace (John Amos), among others. After it is clear that Ritchie will be the Republican nominee, Bartlet dismisses the idea, declaring that he wants Hoynes in the number two spot because of "four words," which he writes down and hands to Hoynes and McGarry to read: "Because I could die."

Throughout the season, it is anticipated that the race will be close, but a stellar performance by Bartlet in the sole debate between the candidates helps give him a landslide victory in both the popular vote and the electoral vote.

=== 2006 presidential election ===
A speed-up in The West Wing's timeline, in part due to the expiration of many cast members' contracts and a desire to continue the program with lower production costs, resulted in the omission of the 2004 midterm elections and an election during the seventh season. The sixth season extensively details the Democratic and Republican primaries. The seventh season covers the lead-up to the general election, the election, and the transition to a new administration. The timeline slows down to concentrate on the general election race. The election, normally held in November, takes place across two episodes originally broadcast on April 2 and 9, 2006.

Congressman Matt Santos (D-TX) (Jimmy Smits) is nominated on the fourth ballot at the Democratic National Convention, during the sixth-season finale. Santos, having planned to leave Congress before being recruited to run for the presidency by Josh Lyman, polls in the low single digits in the Iowa caucus. He is virtually out of the running in the New Hampshire primary before a last-ditch live television commercial vaults him to a third-place finish with 19% of the vote. Josh Lyman, Santos's campaign manager, convinces Leo McGarry to become Santos's running mate.

Senator Arnold Vinick (R-CA) (Alan Alda) secures the Republican nomination, defeating Rep. Glen Allen Walken (R-MO) (John Goodman) (who had served briefly as Acting President during Bartlet's recusal during the Zoey Bartlet kidnapping crisis in season 4) and the Reverend Don Butler (Don S. Davis), among others. Initially, Vinick wants Butler to become his running mate. However, Butler does not want to be considered because of Vinick's stance on abortion. Instead, West Virginia Governor Ray Sullivan (Brett Cullen) is chosen as Vinick's running mate. Vinick is portrayed throughout the sixth season as virtually unbeatable because of his popularity in California, a typically Democratic state, his moderate views, and his wide crossover appeal. Vinick, however, faces difficulty with the anti-abortion members of his party as an abortion rights candidate, and criticism for his support of nuclear power following a serious accident at a Californian nuclear power station.

On the evening of the election, Leo McGarry suffers a massive heart attack and is pronounced dead at the hospital, with the polls still open on the West Coast. The Santos campaign releases the information immediately, while Arnold Vinick refuses to use Leo's death as a "stepstool" to the presidency. Santos emerges as the winner in his home state of Texas, while Vinick wins his home state of California. The election comes down to Nevada, where both candidates need a victory to secure the presidency. Vinick tells his staff repeatedly that he will not allow his campaign to demand a recount of the votes if Santos is declared the winner. Josh Lyman gives Santos the same advice, although the Santos campaign sends a team of lawyers down to Nevada. Santos is pronounced the winner of the election, having won Nevada by 30,000 votes, with an electoral vote margin of 272–266.

According to executive producer Lawrence O'Donnell Jr., the writers originally intended for Vinick to win the election. However, the death of Spencer forced him and his colleagues to consider the emotional strain that would result from having Santos lose both his running mate and the election. It was eventually decided by John Wells that the last episodes would be rescripted. Other statements from John Wells, however, have contradicted O'Donnell's claims about a previously planned Vinick victory. The script showing Santos winning was written long before the death of John Spencer. In 2008, O'Donnell stated to camera, "We actually planned at the outset for Jimmy Smits to win, that was our .. just .. plan of how this was all going to work, but the Vinick character came on so strong in the show, and was so effective, it became a real contest ... and it became a real contest in the West Wing writer's room."

==== Similarities to 2008 United States presidential election ====
Similarities between the fictional 2006 election and the real-life 2008 United States presidential election have been noted in the media:

- The Democratic candidate is a young ethnic minority representing a populous state: Matthew Santos of Texas on the show, Barack Obama of Illinois in real life.
- He has a grueling but successful primary campaign against a more experienced candidate: Bob Russell on the show, Hillary Clinton in real life.
- A third candidate from a Southern state has been damaged by claims of infidelity: John Hoynes of Texas on the show, John Edwards of North Carolina in real life.
- The Democratic nominee chooses an experienced Washington insider as his running mate: Leo McGarry on the show, Joe Biden in real life.
- The Republican contest is determined early in the primary season with an aging "maverick" senator of a western state being the nominee: Arnold Vinick of California on the show, John McCain of Arizona in real life.
- The nominee defeats a staunchly anti-abortion opponent with pastoral experience, among others: Reverend Don Butler on the show, Mike Huckabee in real life.
- He then chooses a younger, socially conservative running mate in the midst of their first term as governor of a sparsely populated, resource-rich state: Ray Sullivan of West Virginia on the show, Sarah Palin of Alaska in real life.

According to David Remnick's biography of Obama, The Bridge, when writer and former White House aide Eli Attie was tasked with fleshing out the first major Santos storylines, he looked to then-U.S. Senator Obama as a model. Attie called David Axelrod, with whom he had worked in politics, "and grilled him about Obama." While Attie says that he "drew inspiration from [Obama] in drawing [the Santos] character," actor Jimmy Smits also says that Obama "was one of the people that I looked to draw upon" for his portrayal of the character. Writer and producer Lawrence O'Donnell says that he partly modeled Vinick after McCain. Obama's former Chief of Staff, Rahm Emanuel, is said to be the basis of the Josh Lyman character, who becomes Santos's Chief of Staff. However, O'Donnell denied this claim. Ahead of the inauguration, a fan posted a video mash-up of The West Wing opening credits with Obama administration officials on YouTube that was featured on HLN's program Showbiz Tonight.

=== Santos transition ===
As the series sunsets with Bartlet's final year in office, little is revealed about Matt Santos's presidency, with the last few episodes mainly focusing on the Santos team's transition into the White House. Santos chooses Josh Lyman as Chief of Staff, who in turn calls on former colleague Sam Seaborn to be Deputy Chief of Staff. Seeking experienced cabinet members, Santos taps Arnold Vinick as Secretary of State, believing the senior statesman to be one of the best strategists available and respected by foreign leaders.

Vinick is at first highly skeptical of Santos' offer, and initially rejects it, but is convinced to accept after a more extensive discussion with Santos leaves him satisfied their foreign policy philosophies will be compatible.

Santos eventually decides on Eric Baker, the Democratic Governor of Pennsylvania and at one point the frontrunner for the Democratic nomination, as his choice to replace Leo McGarry for vice president, and submits his name to Congress under the terms of the Twenty-fifth Amendment to the United States Constitution. While the show ends before he can be confirmed, it is implied he will likely face little opposition from Republicans.

President Bartlet's final act as President of the United States is pardoning Toby Ziegler, who had violated federal law by leaking classified information about a military Space Shuttle. The series ends with Bartlet returning to New Hampshire. Having said his goodbyes to his closest staff, former President Bartlet tells President Santos, "Make me proud, Mr. President," to which Santos responds, "I'll do my best, Mr. President."

== Other broadcasts ==
The show previously reaired on Bravo in the US beginning in 2003 and was previously available on Netflix beginning in 2013. Cable channel TNT reaired episodes of the show in 2020 ahead of the US election and the show's launch on HBO Max in December 2020. In 2022, HLN aired a marathon of the show over the Thanksgiving holiday. After the show was removed from the Max streaming service in the US in December 2024, the series appeared on the top of the rankings for show purchases on iTunes in January 2025. It later returned to streaming on Max a week later on January 8, 2025, after leadership at the platform reportedly had been unaware that it had been flagged for removal. Journalist Oliver Darcy had attributed the removal to an "ROI evaluation" in his newsletter and had written that "it’s a little embarrassing that Warner Bros. Discovery can’t apparently afford to keep its own show (Warner Bros. Television produced the program) on its own streamer." Fans of the show also took credit on social media for its restoration after having expressed their dissatisfaction. The show reached the top 10 most viewed TV series list on Max the week it was restored and the following days.

In the UK, the show originally aired on Sky One in 2000 before subsequently airing on Channel 4, E4 and More4. The show has also been made available on Channel 4's streaming service and on Amazon Prime Video's Freevee platform in the UK.

The 2005 German series Kanzleramt on public broadcaster ZDF drew comparisons with The West Wing. The original did not air in Germany until 2008 to 2012 on the pay television channel Fox.

== Home media ==
The series is available on DVD, with a complete series set released in 2006. Season 1 is in the original 4:3 format while Season 2 onward are presented as anamorphic widescreen. The Season 1 through 6 DVD releases include episode audio commentaries from cast members, writers and directors.

In 2010, the series was released in high-definition for the first time on streaming platforms Amazon Video and iTunes, with the first two seasons remastered in 16:9 to match the aspect ratio and resolution change in the third season. The complete series was released on Blu-ray on October 1, 2024.

== Other media ==
=== Written works ===
Several books have been published about The West Wing. One of the first, in 2001, was Paul C. Challe's Inside the West Wing: An Unauthorized Look at Television's Smartest Show. In 2002, Newmarket Press published The West Wing Script Book, which included episode scripts from Aaron Sorkin from the first two seasons, and in 2003 released a second book featuring shooting scripts from seasons 3 and 4. Also in 2002, Ian Jackman wrote The West Wing (The Official Companion). Analytical books about the series include Peter Rollins' The West Wing: The American Presidency as Television Drama (2003), The Prime-Time Presidency: The West Wing and U.S. Nationalism by Trevor Parry-Giles and Shawn J. Parry-Giles (2006), The West Wing (TV Milestones Series) by Janet McCabe (2012), Claire Handscombe's Walk with Us: How the West Wing Changed Our Lives (2016), and David W. Greybeal's Faith in The West Wing: The Portrayal of Religion in a Primetime Presidency (2023).

Melissa Fitzgerald and Mary McCormack, who portrayed Carol Fitzpatrick and Kate Harper, respectively, co-wrote What's Next: A Backstage Pass to The West Wing, Its Cast and Crew, and Its Enduring Legacy of Service. It was released on August 13, 2024. The book includes behind-the-scenes stories, photos, anecdotes from episodes of the show, and analysis of the show's legacy. They were interviewed together by their colleague when they appeared with Martin Sheen on MSNBC's The Last Word with Lawrence O'Donnell in August 2024 and on The View in September 2024. Fitzgerald and McCormack also participated with Sorkin and various cast members in several events tied to the book's release and the show's 25th anniversary hosted by the Skirball Cultural Center, Warner Bros., and Sixth & I Historic Synagogue. While in Washington, D.C. as part of the promotional events, McCormack, Fitzgerald and Sheen visited the White House, where Sheen had the opportunity to briefly greet President Joe Biden.

=== Twitter accounts ===
In 2010, Twitter accounts for many of the primary characters on The West Wing began to appear, including accounts for President Bartlet, Josh Lyman, Leo McGarry, Matt Santos and Mrs. Landingham. Tweets from the fictional characters have been featured on The Rachel Maddow Show, CNN and questions from the fictional accounts have been answered by Press Secretary Robert Gibbs during a White House Press Conference and from Vice President Joe Biden during a Twitter Town Hall. The success of The West Wing accounts has resulted in several copycats, including accounts from several minor or obscure West Wing characters, including Gail, the fish in C.J.'s office.

=== Podcasts ===
In March 2016, The West Wing Weekly podcast hosted by Hrishikesh Hirway and Joshua Malina began. Each episode of the podcast discusses an episode of The West Wing and has featured various cast and crew members from the series, including several live tapings with an audience.

On March 25, 2019, screenwriters Josh Olson (Oscar-nominated for A History of Violence) and Dave Anthony launched The West Wing Thing, on which the hosts "watch and then discuss" an episode of the series, analyzing and critiquing the show itself as well as its relationship to real-life American politics, both at the time it originally aired and in the present day.

=== Fan conventions ===
A major fan convention, "West Wing Weekend" took place in September 28–30, 2018, at the Marriott Hotel in Bethesda, Maryland. The convention featured guest appearances from some members of the series' cast, as well as a number of panels, fan-based programming, and special events. A Kickstarter campaign for the convention was started on January 4, 2018, to raise $10,000, and it was fully funded within two days.

=== Parodies ===
Many venues, including Funny or Die, Mad TV, 30 Rock, and the Late Night with Seth Meyers have parodied the walk-and-talk cliche of the show, including the "ping-pong" dialogue, in which one character would speak barely a word before the other said another, and then repeated back and forth. In 2000, West Wing cast members participated in a parody as part of the White House Correspondents' Dinner as is recorded in archive footage from the Clinton Presidential Library.

Allison Janney performed in a parody of The West Wing in a 2016 episode of her sitcom Mom, titled "Pure Evil and a Free Piece of Cheesecake". Janney's character, Bonnie Plunkett fantasizes about becoming the President of the United States while doing a walk-and-talk scene with her White House chief of staff played by Richard Schiff.

=== Campaign video ===
During the 2012 campaign season, most of the cast—including Mary McCormack as Kate Harper—appeared in a video paid for by the campaign to elect McCormack's sister Bridget Mary McCormack to a seat on the Michigan Supreme Court. Gently parodying the television series, the characters earnestly discuss the fact that voters often fail to vote in the non-partisan section of their ballots, which in this case would include court candidates such as Bridget McCormack, whose qualifications they praise. Although she is referred to as the sister of actress Mary McCormack, the characters do not recognize the name, except for Harper who finds it vaguely familiar. Bridget McCormack was subsequently elected.

=== A West Wing Special to Benefit When We All Vote ===
In August 2020, it was announced that cast members Martin Sheen, Rob Lowe, Karim Dulé Hill, Allison Janney, Richard Schiff, Bradley Whitford and Janel Moloney would reprise their roles for a stage version of the episode "Hartsfield's Landing". The episode was intended to raise awareness and support for When We All Vote, a nonprofit organization founded to increase participation in United States elections by Michelle Obama, Lin-Manuel Miranda and others. Production began in early October 2020 at Los Angeles' Orpheum Theatre and premiered on October 15 on HBO Max. In connection with the special, the cast were featured on the cover of Entertainment Weekly, which also released a separate election year collector's edition looking back at the show. They also appeared together on the Late Show with Stephen Colbert.
