= International Society of Logistics =

The International Society of Logistics (also known as SOLE, as it was originally the Society of Logistics Engineers) is a non-profit organization devoted to the development and promotion of logistics, including improvements in technology, education and management. SOLE sponsored the Annual Logistics Conference and Exposition and founded the Logistics Education Foundation. The organization communicates via their newsletter, the SOLEtter.

== History ==
In March 1966 Dr. Wernher von Braun established the need for a NASA annual logistics symposium. This [first] symposium was to be in August 1966 at the Marshall Space Flight Center; and due to the importance, several high level corporate executives and company presidents were to be in attendance. To insure that the symposium was successful, von Braun solicited help from numerous company presidents at: Aircraft Company. Douglas Aircraft Company, Martin Marietta, RCA, and North American.
