= Distributed mode loudspeaker =

Loudspeaker technology

Distributed Mode Loudspeaker (DML) is a flat-panel loudspeaker technology, developed by NXT, in which sound is produced by inducing uniformly distributed vibration modes in the panel through a special electro-acoustic exciter. Distributed mode loudspeakers function differently from most others, which typically produce sound by inducing pistonic motion in the diaphragm.

Exciters for distributed mode loudspeakers include, but are not limited to, moving coil and piezoelectric devices, and are placed to correspond to the natural resonant model of the panel.

== Applications ==
NXT licenses two classes of distributed mode loudspeaker: SurfaceSound for traditional flat-panel applications, and SoundVu for applications in which sound is produced directly in front of the display (either through a projection screen which functions as a DML or a transparent DML overlaid on the display). SurfaceSound technology has been incorporated into a number of novel products such as school equipment, portable folding cardboard speakers (SoundpaX, an OEM product manufactured by a number of different companies), and high-end musical greeting cards. Aside from projection screens, SoundVu has been integrated into computer and mobile phone displays.

NXT also licenses the Balanced Mode Radiator (BMR), a hybrid technology that blends DML technology with that of traditional pistonic-action loudspeakers. According to NXT, the resultant speakers feature the low-frequency performance of a traditional loudspeaker, but with a wider directivity and shallower profile, as well as the mid-range and high-frequency performance of a DML. The two types of BMR offered are: the Audio Full Range (AFR), a full-range optimized circular speaker; and the High Aspect Ratio Panel (HARP), a long and thin form factor for use in narrower spaces.

DML exciters are compatible with traditional amplifiers.

Initial testing by researchers at the Delft University of Technology concluded that DML panels are good potential candidates for use in wave field synthesis applications, as they are light and can be placed close to walls.

== Purported advantages and disadvantages ==
=== Advantages ===
- Broad frequency range (100 – 24,000 Hz for 0.6m^{2} panel).
- The air radiation resistance is small and constant with frequency. This means that directivity is not affected by size of speaker.
- Bipolar (radiates sound in 2 directions), but may be made forward directed.
- Flat, don't require enclosing, may be produced in different shapes, may be decorated etc. Some DML units are designed to be plastered into walls and completely hidden.
- Low cost of materials relative to traditional loudspeaker designs.

=== Disadvantages ===
- Problems radiating low frequencies. Increase in size makes it possible to radiate sound with lower frequencies.
- Low directivity and slow fading may lessen stereophonic sound impression. Still, listening from an off-center position gives some imaging of phantom sources as the other speaker can be heard with its full spectrum, but with extra delay due to the listeners local position.

== Business history ==
NXT created intellectual property for surface transducers. HiWave Audio was created in late 2010 as the rebirth of NXT. Tectonic Elements was founded following the acquisition of HiWave Audio by FLAT Audio Technologies.
