= Primetime Emmy Award for Outstanding Supporting Actor in a Drama Series =

Award

- Awarded for: Outstanding Supporting Actor in a Drama Series
- Country: United States
- Presented by: Academy of Television Arts & Sciences
- First award: 1954
- Currently held by: Tom Pelphrey, Task (2026)
- Website: emmys.com

The Primetime Emmy Award for Outstanding Supporting Actor in a Drama Series is an award presented by the Academy of Television Arts & Sciences (ATAS). In early Primetime Emmy Award ceremonies, the supporting categories were not always genre, or even gender, specific. Beginning with 1970, supporting actors in drama have competed alone. However, these dramatic performances often included actors from miniseries, telefilms, and guest performers competing against main cast competitors. Such instances are marked below:

- # – Indicates a performance in a Miniseries or Television film, prior to the category's creation in 1975
- § – Indicates a performance as a guest performer, prior to the category's creation in 1975

== Winners and nominations ==
=== 1950s ===
Year	Actor	Role	Program	Network
Best Series Supporting Actor
1954 (6th) (Note: Early Emmy ceremonies did not have genre specific acting categories)
1954 (6th)	Art Carney	Various characters	The Jackie Gleason Show	CBS
1954 (6th)	Ben Alexander	Officer Frank Smith	Dragnet	NBC
1954 (6th)	William Frawley	Fred Mertz	I Love Lucy	CBS
1954 (6th)	Tony Randall	Harvey Weskitt	Mister Peepers	NBC
1954 (6th)	Carl Reiner	Various characters	Your Show of Shows	NBC
Best Supporting Actor in a Regular Series
1955 (7th)
1955 (7th)	Art Carney	Various characters	The Jackie Gleason Show	CBS
1955 (7th)	Ben Alexander	Officer Frank Smith	Dragnet	NBC
1955 (7th)	Don DeFore	Thorny	The Adventures of Ozzie & Harriet	ABC
1955 (7th)	William Frawley	Fred Mertz	I Love Lucy	CBS
1955 (7th)	Gale Gordon	Osgood Conklin	Our Miss Brooks	CBS
Best Actor in a Supporting Role
1956 (8th)
1956 (8th)	Art Carney	Ed Norton	The Honeymooners	CBS
1956 (8th)	Ed Begley #	Andy Sloane	Patterns	NBC
1956 (8th)	William Frawley	Fred Mertz	I Love Lucy	CBS
1956 (8th)	Carl Reiner	Various characters	Caesar's Hour	NBC
1956 (8th)	Cyril Ritchard #	Mr. Darling / Captain Hook	Peter Pan	NBC
Best Supporting Performance by an Actor
1957 (9th)
1957 (9th)	Carl Reiner	Various characters	Caesar's Hour	NBC
1957 (9th)	Art Carney	Various characters	The Jackie Gleason Show	CBS
1957 (9th)	Paul Ford	Col. John T. Hall	The Phil Silvers Show	CBS
1957 (9th)	William Frawley	Fred Mertz	I Love Lucy	CBS
1957 (9th)	Ed Wynn #	Army	Requiem for a Heavyweight	CBS
Best Continuing Supporting Performance by an Actor in a Dramatic or Comedy Series
1958 (10th)
1958 (10th)	Carl Reiner	Various characters	Caesar's Hour	NBC
1958 (10th)	Paul Ford	Col. John T. Hall	The Phil Silvers Show	CBS
1958 (10th)	William Frawley	Fred Mertz	I Love Lucy	CBS
1958 (10th)	Louis Nye	Various characters	The Steve Allen Show	NBC
1958 (10th)	Dennis Weaver	Chester Goode	Gunsmoke	CBS
Best Supporting Actor (Continuing Character) in a Dramatic Series
1959 (11th)
1959 (11th)	Dennis Weaver	Chester Goode	Gunsmoke	CBS
1959 (11th)	Herschel Bernardi	Lt. Jacoby	Peter Gunn	NBC
1959 (11th)	Johnny Crawford	Mark McCain	The Rifleman	ABC
1959 (11th)	William Hopper	Paul Drake	Perry Mason	CBS

=== 1960s ===
Year	Actor	Role	Program	Network
Outstanding Performance by an Actor in a Series (Lead or Support)
1960 (12th)
1960 (12th)	Robert Stack	Eliot Ness	The Untouchables	ABC
1960 (12th)	Richard Boone	Paladin	Have Gun – Will Travel	CBS
1960 (12th)	Raymond Burr	Perry Mason	Perry Mason	CBS
Outstanding Performance in a Supporting Role by an Actor or Actress in a Series
1961 (13th)
1961 (13th)	Don Knotts	Barney Fife	The Andy Griffith Show	CBS
1961 (13th)	Abby Dalton	Lt. Martha Hale	Hennesey	CBS
1961 (13th)	Barbara Hale	Della Street	Perry Mason	CBS
Outstanding Performance in a Supporting Role by an Actor
1962 (14th)
1962 (14th)	Don Knotts	Barney Fife	The Andy Griffith Show	CBS
1962 (14th)	Sam Jaffe	Dr. David Zorba	Ben Casey	ABC
1962 (14th)	Barry Jones #	The Dean	Hallmark Hall of Fame	NBC
1962 (14th)	Horace McMahon	Lt. Mike Parker	Naked City	ABC
1962 (14th)	George C. Scott §	Dr. Karl Anders	Ben Casey	ABC
1963 (15th)
1963 (15th)	Don Knotts	Barney Fife	The Andy Griffith Show	CBS
1963 (15th)	Tim Conway	Ens. Charles Parker	McHale's Navy	ABC
1963 (15th)	Paul Ford #	Col. Wainwright Purdy III	Teahouse of the August Moon: Hallmark Hall of Fame	NBC
1963 (15th)	Hurd Hatfield #	Lionel de Rothschild	Invincible Mr. Disraeli: Hallmark Hall of Fame	NBC
1963 (15th)	Robert Redford #	George Laurents	Premiere, Presented by Fred Astaire	ABC
1964 (16th)
1964 (16th)	Albert Paulsen #	Lt. Volkoval	Bob Hope Presents the Chrysler Theatre	NBC
1964 (16th)	Sorrell Booke §	Julius Orloff	Dr. Kildare	NBC
1964 (16th)	Conlan Carter	Doc	Combat!	ABC
1964 (16th)	Carl Lee §	Lonnie Hill	The Nurses	CBS
Outstanding Individual Achievements in Entertainment - Actors and Performers
1965 (17th)
1965 (17th)	Leonard Bernstein	Conductor	New York Philharmonic Young People's Concerts with Leonard Bernstein	CBS
1965 (17th)	Lynn Fontanne	Fanny Bowditch Holmes	Hallmark Hall of Fame: "The Magnificent Yankee"	NBC
1965 (17th)	Alfred Lunt	Oliver Wendell Holmes	Hallmark Hall of Fame: "The Magnificent Yankee"	NBC
1965 (17th)	Barbra Streisand	Herself	My Name Is Barbra	CBS
1965 (17th)	Dick Van Dyke	Rob Petrie	The Dick Van Dyke Show	CBS
1965 (17th)	Julie Andrews	Herself	The Andy Williams Show	NBC
1965 (17th)	Johnny Carson	Himself	The Tonight Show Starring Johnny Carson	NBC
1965 (17th)	Gladys Cooper	Margaret St. Clair	The Rogues	NBC
1965 (17th)	Robert Coote	Timmy St. Clair	The Rogues	NBC
1965 (17th)	Richard Crenna	James Slattery	Slattery's People	CBS
1965 (17th)	Julie Harris	Florence Nightingale	Hallmark Hall of Fame: "The Holy Terror"	NBC
1965 (17th)	Bob Hope	Himself	Chrysler Presents A Bob Hope Comedy Special	NBC
1965 (17th)	Dean Jagger	Principal Albert Vane	Mr. Novak	NBC
1965 (17th)	Danny Kaye	Himself	The Danny Kaye Show	CBS
1965 (17th)	David McCallum	Illya Kuryakin	The Man from U.N.C.L.E.	NBC
1965 (17th)	Red Skelton	Himself	The Red Skelton Hour	CBS
Outstanding Performance by an Actor in a Supporting Role in a Drama Series
1966 (18th)
1966 (18th)	James Daly #	Dr. O'Meara	Eagle in a Cage	NBC
1966 (18th)	David Burns §	The Great McGonigle	The Trials of O'Brien	CBS
1966 (18th)	Leo G. Carroll	Alexander Waverly	The Man from U.N.C.L.E.	NBC
1967 (19th)
1967 (19th)	Eli Wallach #	Happy Locarno	The Poppy Is Also a Flower	ABC
1967 (19th)	Leo G. Carroll	Alexander Waverly	The Man from U.N.C.L.E.	NBC
1967 (19th)	Leonard Nimoy	Spock	Star Trek	NBC
1968 (20th)
1968 (20th)	Milburn Stone	Doc	Gunsmoke	CBS
1968 (20th)	Joseph Campanella	Lew Wickersham	Mannix	CBS
1968 (20th)	Lawrence Dobkin #	Dr. Gettlinger	CBS Playhouse	CBS
1968 (20th)	Leonard Nimoy	Spock	Star Trek	NBC
Outstanding Continued Performance by an Actor in a Supporting Role in a Series
1969 (21st)
1969 (21st)	Werner Klemperer	Colonel Klink	Hogan's Heroes	CBS
1969 (21st)	Greg Morris	Barney Collier	Mission: Impossible	CBS
1969 (21st)	Leonard Nimoy	Spock	Star Trek	NBC

=== 1970s ===
Year	Actor	Role	Program	Network
Outstanding Performance by an Actor in a Supporting Role in Drama
1970 (22nd)
1970 (22nd)	James Brolin	Dr. Steven Kiley	Marcus Welby, M.D.	ABC
1970 (22nd)	Tige Andrews	Capt. Adam Greer	The Mod Squad	ABC
1970 (22nd)	Greg Morris	Barney Collier	Mission: Impossible	CBS
1971 (23rd)
1971 (23rd)	David Burns #	Mr. Solomon	The Price: Hallmark Hall of Fame	NBC
1971 (23rd)	James Brolin	Dr. Steven Kiley	Marcus Welby, M.D.	ABC
1971 (23rd)	Robert Young #	Senator Earl Gannon	Vanished!: NBC World Premiere Movie	NBC
1972 (24th)
1972 (24th)	Jack Warden #	George Halas	Brian's Song: ABC Movie of the Week	ABC
1972 (24th)	James Brolin	Dr. Steven Kiley	Marcus Welby, M.D.	ABC
1972 (24th)	Greg Morris	Barney Collier	Mission: Impossible	CBS
1973 (25th)
1973 (25th)	Scott Jacoby #	Nick Salter	That Certain Summer: ABC Movie of the Week	ABC
1973 (25th)	James Brolin	Dr. Steven Kiley	Marcus Welby, M.D.	ABC
1973 (25th)	Will Geer	Zebulon Walton	The Waltons	CBS
Best Supporting Actor in Drama
1974 (26th)
1974 (26th)	Michael Moriarty #	Jim O'Connor	The Glass Menagerie	ABC
1974 (26th)	Sam Waterston #	Tom Wingfield	The Glass Menagerie	ABC
1974 (26th)	Michael Douglas	Steve Keller	The Streets of San Francisco	ABC
1974 (26th)	Will Geer	Zebulon Walton	The Waltons	CBS
Outstanding Continuing Performance by a Supporting Actor in a Drama Series
1975 (27th)
1975 (27th)	Will Geer	Zebulon Walton	The Waltons	CBS
1975 (27th)	J.D. Cannon	Peter B. Clifford	McCloud	NBC
1975 (27th)	Michael Douglas	Steve Keller	The Streets of San Francisco	ABC
1976 (28th)
1976 (28th)	Anthony Zerbe	Lt. K.C. Trench	Harry O	ABC
1976 (28th)	Ray Milland #	Duncan Calderwood	Rich Man, Poor Man	ABC
1976 (28th)	Robert Reed #	Teddy Boylan	Rich Man, Poor Man	ABC
1976 (28th)	Michael Douglas	Steve Keller	The Streets of San Francisco	ABC
1976 (28th)	Will Geer	Zebulon Walton	The Waltons	CBS
1977 (29th)
1977 (29th)	Gary Frank	Willie Lawrence	Family	ABC
1977 (29th)	Noah Beery Jr.	Joseph "Rocky" Rockford	The Rockford Files	NBC
1977 (29th)	David Doyle	John Bosley	Charlie's Angels	ABC
1977 (29th)	Tom Ewell	Billy Truman	Baretta	ABC
1977 (29th)	Will Geer	Zebulon Walton	The Waltons	CBS
1978 (30th)
1978 (30th)	Robert Vaughn #	Frank Flaherty	Washington: Behind Closed Doors	ABC
1978 (30th)	Sam Wanamaker #	Moses Weiss	Holocaust	NBC
1978 (30th)	David Warner #	Heydrich	Holocaust	NBC
1978 (30th)	Ossie Davis #	Martin Luther King Sr.	King	NBC
1978 (30th)	Will Geer	Zebulon Walton	The Waltons	CBS
Outstanding Supporting Actor in a Drama Series
1979 (31st)
1979 (31st)	Stuart Margolin	Evelyn "Angel" Martin	The Rockford Files	NBC
1979 (31st)	Noah Beery Jr.	Joseph "Rocky" Rockford	The Rockford Files	NBC
1979 (31st)	Joe Santos	Det. Dennis Becker	The Rockford Files	NBC
1979 (31st)	Mason Adams	Charlie Hume	Lou Grant	CBS
1979 (31st)	Robert Walden	Joe Rossi	Lou Grant	CBS

=== 1980s ===
Year	Actor	Role	Program	Network
1980 (32nd)
1980 (32nd)	Stuart Margolin	Evelyn "Angel" Martin	The Rockford Files	NBC
1980 (32nd)	Noah Beery Jr.	Joseph "Rocky" Rockford	The Rockford Files	NBC
1980 (32nd)	Mason Adams	Charlie Hume	Lou Grant	CBS
1980 (32nd)	Robert Walden	Joe Rossi	Lou Grant	CBS
1981 (33rd)
1981 (33rd)	Michael Conrad	Sgt. Phil Esterhaus	Hill Street Blues	NBC
1981 (33rd)	Charles Haid	Officer Andy Renko	Hill Street Blues	NBC
1981 (33rd)	Bruce Weitz	Det. Mick Belker	Hill Street Blues	NBC
1981 (33rd)	Mason Adams	Charlie Hume	Lou Grant	CBS
1981 (33rd)	Robert Walden	Joe Rossi	Lou Grant	CBS
1982 (34th)
1982 (34th)	Michael Conrad	Sgt. Phil Esterhaus	Hill Street Blues	NBC
1982 (34th)	Taurean Blacque	Det. Neal Washington	Hill Street Blues	NBC
1982 (34th)	Charles Haid	Officer Andy Renko	Hill Street Blues	NBC
1982 (34th)	Michael Warren	Officer Bobby Hill	Hill Street Blues	NBC
1982 (34th)	Bruce Weitz	Det. Mick Belker	Hill Street Blues	NBC
1983 (35th)
1983 (35th)	James Coco §	Arnie	St. Elsewhere	NBC
1983 (35th)	Ed Begley Jr.	Dr. Victor Ehrlich	St. Elsewhere	NBC
1983 (35th)	Michael Conrad	Sgt. Phil Esterhaus	Hill Street Blues	NBC
1983 (35th)	Joe Spano	Sgt. Henry Goldblume	Hill Street Blues	NBC
1983 (35th)	Bruce Weitz	Det. Mick Belker	Hill Street Blues	NBC
1984 (36th)
1984 (36th)	Bruce Weitz	Det. Mick Belker	Hill Street Blues	NBC
1984 (36th)	Michael Conrad	Sgt. Phil Esterhaus	Hill Street Blues	NBC
1984 (36th)	James Sikking	Lt. Howard Hunter	Hill Street Blues	NBC
1984 (36th)	Ed Begley Jr.	Dr. Victor Ehrlich	St. Elsewhere	NBC
1984 (36th)	John Hillerman	Jonathan Higgins	Magnum, P.I.	CBS
1985 (37th)
1985 (37th)	Edward James Olmos	Lt. Martin Castillo	Miami Vice	NBC
1985 (37th)	Ed Begley Jr.	Dr. Victor Ehrlich	St. Elsewhere	NBC
1985 (37th)	Bruce Weitz	Det. Mick Belker	Hill Street Blues	NBC
1985 (37th)	John Hillerman	Jonathan Higgins	Magnum, P.I.	CBS
1985 (37th)	John Karlen	Harvey Lacey Sr.	Cagney & Lacey	CBS
1986 (38th)
1986 (38th)	John Karlen	Harvey Lacey Sr.	Cagney & Lacey	CBS
1986 (38th)	John Hillerman	Jonathan Higgins	Magnum, P.I.	CBS
1986 (38th)	Ed Begley Jr.	Dr. Victor Ehrlich	St. Elsewhere	NBC
1986 (38th)	Edward James Olmos	Lt. Martin Castillo	Miami Vice	NBC
1986 (38th)	Bruce Weitz	Det. Mick Belker	Hill Street Blues	NBC
1987 (39th)
1987 (39th)	John Hillerman	Jonathan Higgins	Magnum, P.I.	CBS
1987 (39th)	Jimmy Smits	Victor Sifuentes	L.A. Law	NBC
1987 (39th)	Michael Tucker	Stuart Markowitz	L.A. Law	NBC
1987 (39th)	Ed Begley Jr.	Dr. Victor Ehrlich	St. Elsewhere	NBC
1987 (39th)	John Karlen	Harvey Lacey Sr.	Cagney & Lacey	CBS
1988 (40th)
1988 (40th)	Larry Drake	Benny Stulwicz	L.A. Law	NBC
1988 (40th)	Alan Rachins	Douglas Brackman	L.A. Law	NBC
1988 (40th)	Jimmy Smits	Victor Sifuentes	L.A. Law	NBC
1988 (40th)	Ed Begley Jr.	Dr. Victor Ehrlich	St. Elsewhere	NBC
1988 (40th)	Timothy Busfield	Elliot Weston	Thirtysomething	ABC
1989 (41st)
1989 (41st)	Larry Drake	Benny Stulwicz	L.A. Law	NBC
1989 (41st)	Richard Dysart	Leland McKenzie	L.A. Law	NBC
1989 (41st)	Jimmy Smits	Victor Sifuentes	L.A. Law	NBC
1989 (41st)	Jonathan Banks	Frank McPike	Wiseguy	CBS
1989 (41st)	Timothy Busfield	Elliot Weston	Thirtysomething	ABC

=== 1990s ===
Year	Actor	Role	Program	Network
1990 (42nd)
1990 (42nd)	Jimmy Smits	Victor Sifuentes	L.A. Law	NBC
1990 (42nd)	Larry Drake	Benny Stulwicz	L.A. Law	NBC
1990 (42nd)	Richard Dysart	Leland McKenzie	L.A. Law	NBC
1990 (42nd)	Dean Stockwell	Al Calavicci	Quantum Leap	NBC
1990 (42nd)	Timothy Busfield	Elliot Weston	Thirtysomething	ABC
1991 (43rd)
1991 (43rd)	Timothy Busfield	Elliot Weston	Thirtysomething	ABC
1991 (43rd)	David Clennon	Miles Drentell	Thirtysomething	ABC
1991 (43rd)	Richard Dysart	Leland McKenzie	L.A. Law	NBC
1991 (43rd)	Jimmy Smits	Victor Sifuentes	L.A. Law	NBC
1991 (43rd)	Dean Stockwell	Al Calavicci	Quantum Leap	NBC
1992 (44th)
1992 (44th)	Richard Dysart	Leland McKenzie	L.A. Law	NBC
1992 (44th)	Jimmy Smits §	Victor Sifuentes	L.A. Law	NBC
1992 (44th)	Ed Asner	Walter Kovacs	The Trials of Rosie O'Neill	CBS
1992 (44th)	John Corbett	Chris Stevens	Northern Exposure	CBS
1992 (44th)	Richard Kiley §	Doug Spaulding	The Ray Bradbury Theater	HBO
1992 (44th)	Dean Stockwell	Al Calavicci	Quantum Leap	NBC
1993 (45th)
1993 (45th)	Chad Lowe	Jesse McKenna	Life Goes On	ABC
1993 (45th)	Barry Corbin	Maurice Minnifield	Northern Exposure	CBS
1993 (45th)	John Cullum	Holling Vincouver	Northern Exposure	CBS
1993 (45th)	Fyvush Finkel	Douglas Wambaugh	Picket Fences	CBS
1993 (45th)	Dean Stockwell	Al Calavicci	Quantum Leap	NBC
1994 (46th)
1994 (46th)	Fyvush Finkel	Douglas Wambaugh	Picket Fences	CBS
1994 (46th)	Ray Walston	Henry Bone	Picket Fences	CBS
1994 (46th)	Gordon Clapp	Greg Medavoy	NYPD Blue	ABC
1994 (46th)	Nicholas Turturro	James Martinez	NYPD Blue	ABC
1994 (46th)	Barry Corbin	Maurice Minnifield	Northern Exposure	CBS
1995 (47th)
1995 (47th)	Ray Walston	Henry Bone	Picket Fences	CBS
1995 (47th)	Eriq La Salle	Peter Benton	ER	NBC
1995 (47th)	Noah Wyle	John Carter	ER	NBC
1995 (47th)	Héctor Elizondo	Phillip Watters	Chicago Hope	CBS
1995 (47th)	James Earl Jones	Neb Langston	Under One Roof	CBS
1996 (48th)
1996 (48th)	Ray Walston	Henry Bone	Picket Fences	CBS
1996 (48th)	Héctor Elizondo	Phillip Watters	Chicago Hope	CBS
1996 (48th)	James McDaniel	Arthur Fancy	NYPD Blue	ABC
1996 (48th)	Stanley Tucci	Richard Cross	Murder One	ABC
1996 (48th)	Noah Wyle	John Carter	ER	NBC
1997 (49th)
1997 (49th)	Héctor Elizondo	Phillip Watters	Chicago Hope	CBS
1997 (49th)	Eriq La Salle	Peter Benton	ER	NBC
1997 (49th)	Noah Wyle	John Carter	ER	NBC
1997 (49th)	Adam Arkin	Aaron Shutt	Chicago Hope	CBS
1997 (49th)	Nicholas Turturro	James Martinez	NYPD Blue	ABC
1998 (50th)
1998 (50th)	Gordon Clapp	Greg Medavoy	NYPD Blue	ABC
1998 (50th)	Eriq La Salle	Peter Benton	ER	NBC
1998 (50th)	Noah Wyle	John Carter	ER	NBC
1998 (50th)	Steven Hill	Adam Schiff	Law & Order	NBC
1998 (50th)	Héctor Elizondo	Phillip Watters	Chicago Hope	CBS
1999 (51st)
1999 (51st)	Michael Badalucco	Jimmy Berluti	The Practice	ABC
1999 (51st)	Benjamin Bratt	Rey Curtis	Law & Order	NBC
1999 (51st)	Steven Hill	Adam Schiff	Law & Order	NBC
1999 (51st)	Noah Wyle	John Carter	ER	NBC
1999 (51st)	Steve Harris	Eugene Young	The Practice	ABC

=== 2000s ===
Year	Actor	Role	Program	Episode Submissions	Network
2000 (52nd)
2000 (52nd)	Richard Schiff	Toby Ziegler	The West Wing	"In Excelsis Deo” + “Five Votes Down"	NBC
2000 (52nd)	John Spencer	Leo McGarry	The West Wing	"Let Bartlet Be Bartlet” + “Five Votes Down"	NBC
2000 (52nd)	Michael Badalucco	Jimmy Berlutti	The Practice		ABC
2000 (52nd)	Steve Harris	Eugene Young	The Practice		ABC
2000 (52nd)	Dominic Chianese	Junior Soprano	The Sopranos		HBO
2001 (53rd)
2001 (53rd)	Bradley Whitford	Josh Lyman	The West Wing	"Noel" + "In the Shadow of Two Gunmen"	NBC
2001 (53rd)	Richard Schiff	Toby Ziegler	The West Wing	"17 People" + "The Leadership Breakfast"	NBC
2001 (53rd)	John Spencer	Leo McGarry	The West Wing	"In the Shadow of Two Gunmen" + "The Leadership Breakfast"	NBC
2001 (53rd)	Dominic Chianese	Junior Soprano	The Sopranos	"Second Opinion" + "Another Toothpick"	HBO
2001 (53rd)	Michael Imperioli	Christopher Moltisanti	The Sopranos	"Fortunate Son" + "Pine Barrens"	HBO
2002 (54th)
2002 (54th)	John Spencer	Leo McGarry	The West Wing	"Bartlet for America" + "We Killed Yamamoto"	NBC
2002 (54th)	Richard Schiff	Toby Ziegler	The West Wing	"Hartsfield's Landing" + "Night Five"	NBC
2002 (54th)	Bradley Whitford	Josh Lyman	The West Wing	"H.Con-172" + "The Two Bartlets"	NBC
2002 (54th)	Dulé Hill	Charlie Young	The West Wing	"Hartsfield's Landing" + "Enemies, Foreign and Domestic"	NBC
2002 (54th)	Victor Garber	Jack Bristow	Alias	"Color Blind" + "Almost Thirty Years"	ABC
2002 (54th)	Freddy Rodriguez	Federico "Rico" Diaz	Six Feet Under	"The Trip" + "I'll Take You"	HBO
2003 (55th)
2003 (55th)	Joe Pantoliano	Ralph Cifaretto	The Sopranos	"Christopher" + "Whoever Did This"	HBO
2003 (55th)	John Spencer	Leo McGarry	The West Wing	"Red Mass" + "Twenty Five"	NBC
2003 (55th)	Bradley Whitford	Josh Lyman	The West Wing	"20 Hours In America" + "Evidence of Things Not Seen"	NBC
2003 (55th)	Victor Garber	Jack Bristow	Alias	"Passage Part 2" + "Endgame"	ABC
2003 (55th)	Michael Imperioli	Christopher Moltisanti	The Sopranos	"The Strong, Silent Type" + "Whoever Did This"	HBO
2004 (56th)
2004 (56th)	Michael Imperioli	Christopher Moltisanti	The Sopranos	"Irregular Around the Margins" + "Long Term Parking"	HBO
2004 (56th)	Steve Buscemi	Tony Blundetto	The Sopranos	"Rat Pack" + "Marco Polo"	HBO
2004 (56th)	John Spencer	Leo McGarry	The West Wing	"An Khe" + "Memorial Day"	NBC
2004 (56th)	Brad Dourif	Dr. Amos "Doc" Cochran	Deadwood	"Deep Water" + "No Other Sons or Daughters"	HBO
2004 (56th)	Victor Garber	Jack Bristow	Alias	"Breaking Point" + "Hourglass"	ABC
2005 (57th)
2005 (57th)	William Shatner	Denny Crane	Boston Legal	"It Girls and Beyond" + "Tortured Souls"	ABC
2005 (57th)	Naveen Andrews	Sayid Jarrah	Lost	"Solitary" + "The Greater Good"	ABC
2005 (57th)	Terry O'Quinn	John Locke	Lost	"Walkabout" + "The Moth"	ABC
2005 (57th)	Alan Alda	Arnold Vinick	The West Wing	"King Corn" + "In God We Trust"	NBC
2005 (57th)	Oliver Platt	Russell Tupper	Huff	"That F**kin'Cabin" + "Crazy, Nuts and All Messed Up	Showtime
2006 (58th)
2006 (58th)	Alan Alda	Arnold Vinick	The West Wing	"Two Weeks Out" + "The Last Hurrah"	NBC
2006 (58th)	Michael Imperioli	Christopher Moltisanti	The Sopranos	"Luxury Lounge" + "The Ride"	HBO
2006 (58th)	Gregory Itzin	Charles Logan	24	"Day 5: 3:00-4:00am" + "Day 5: 6:00-7:00am"	Fox
2006 (58th)	Oliver Platt	Russell Tupper	Huff	"Red Meat" + "So…What Brings You to Armageddon"	Showtime
2006 (58th)	William Shatner	Denny Crane	Boston Legal	"Witches of Mass Destruction" + "Live Big"	ABC
2007 (59th)
2007 (59th)	Terry O'Quinn	John Locke	Lost	"The Man from Tallahassee"	ABC
2007 (59th)	Michael Emerson	Ben Linus	Lost	"The Man Behind the Curtain"	ABC
2007 (59th)	Michael Imperioli	Christopher Moltisanti	The Sopranos	"Walk Like a Man"	HBO
2007 (59th)	T. R. Knight	George O'Malley	Grey's Anatomy	"Six Days, Parts 1 & 2"	ABC
2007 (59th)	Masi Oka	Hiro Nakamura	Heroes	"Five Years Gone"	NBC
2007 (59th)	William Shatner	Denny Crane	Boston Legal	"Son of a Defender"	ABC
2008 (60th)
2008 (60th)	Željko Ivanek	Ray Fiske	Damages	"I Hate These People"	FX
2008 (60th)	Ted Danson	Arthur Frobisher	Damages	"Jesus, Mary and Joe C-cker"	FX
2008 (60th)	Michael Emerson	Ben Linus	Lost	"The Shape of Things to Come"	ABC
2008 (60th)	William Shatner	Denny Crane	Boston Legal	"Mad About You"	ABC
2008 (60th)	John Slattery	Roger Sterling	Mad Men	"Long Weekend"	AMC
2009 (61st)
2009 (61st)	Michael Emerson	Ben Linus	Lost	"Dead is dead"	ABC
2009 (61st)	Aaron Paul	Jesse Pinkman	Breaking Bad	"Peekaboo"	AMC
2009 (61st)	Christian Clemenson	Jerry Espenson	Boston Legal	"Roe"	ABC
2009 (61st)	William Shatner	Denny Crane	Boston Legal	"Made in China"/"Last Call"	ABC
2009 (61st)	William Hurt	Daniel Purcell	Damages	"Hey! Mr. Pibb!"	FX
2009 (61st)	John Slattery	Roger Sterling	Mad Men	"Six Month Leave"	

=== 2010s ===
Year	Actor	Role	Program	Episode Submissions	Network
2010 (62nd)
2010 (62nd)	Aaron Paul	Jesse Pinkman	Breaking Bad	"Half Measures"	AMC
2010 (62nd)	Andre Braugher	Owen Thoreau, Jr.	Men of a Certain Age	"Powerless"	TNT
2010 (62nd)	Michael Emerson	Ben Linus	Lost	"Dr. Linus"	ABC
2010 (62nd)	Terry O'Quinn	John Locke	Lost	"The Substitute"	ABC
2010 (62nd)	Martin Short	Leonard Winstone	Damages	"You Haven't Replaced Me"	FX
2010 (62nd)	John Slattery	Roger Sterling	Mad Men	"The Gypsy and the Hobo"	AMC
2011 (63rd)
2011 (63rd)	Peter Dinklage	Tyrion Lannister	Game of Thrones	"Baelor"	HBO
2011 (63rd)	Andre Braugher	Owen Thoreau, Jr.	Men of a Certain Age	"Let the Sunshine In"	TNT
2011 (63rd)	Josh Charles	Will Gardner	The Good Wife	"Closing Arguments"	CBS
2011 (63rd)	Alan Cumming	Eli Gold	The Good Wife	"Silver Bullet"	CBS
2011 (63rd)	Walton Goggins	Boyd Crowder	Justified	"The I of the Storm"	FX
2011 (63rd)	John Slattery	Roger Sterling	Mad Men	"Hands and Knees"	AMC
2012 (64th)
2012 (64th)	Aaron Paul	Jesse Pinkman	Breaking Bad	"End Times"	AMC
2012 (64th)	Jim Carter	Charles Carson	Downton Abbey	"Episode 202"	PBS
2012 (64th)	Brendan Coyle	John Bates	Downton Abbey	"Episode 207"	PBS
2012 (64th)	Peter Dinklage	Tyrion Lannister	Game of Thrones	"Blackwater"	HBO
2012 (64th)	Giancarlo Esposito	Gus Fring	Breaking Bad	"Salud"	AMC
2012 (64th)	Jared Harris	Lane Pryce	Mad Men	"Commissions and Fees"	AMC
2013 (65th)
2013 (65th)	Bobby Cannavale	Gyp Rosetti	Boardwalk Empire	"Sunday Best"	HBO
2013 (65th)	Jonathan Banks	Mike Ehrmantraut	Breaking Bad	"Say My Name"	AMC
2013 (65th)	Jim Carter	Charles Carson	Downton Abbey	"Episode 306"	PBS
2013 (65th)	Peter Dinklage	Tyrion Lannister	Game of Thrones	"Second Sons"	HBO
2013 (65th)	Mandy Patinkin	Saul Berenson	Homeland	"The Choice"	Showtime
2013 (65th)	Aaron Paul	Jesse Pinkman	Breaking Bad	"Buyout"	AMC
2014 (66th)
2014 (66th)	Aaron Paul	Jesse Pinkman	Breaking Bad	"Confessions"	AMC
2014 (66th)	Jim Carter	Charles Carson	Downton Abbey	"Episode 401"	PBS
2014 (66th)	Josh Charles	Will Gardner	The Good Wife	"Hitting the Fan"	CBS
2014 (66th)	Peter Dinklage	Tyrion Lannister	Game of Thrones	"The Laws of Gods and Men"	HBO
2014 (66th)	Mandy Patinkin	Saul Berenson	Homeland	"Gerontion"	Showtime
2014 (66th)	Jon Voight	Mickey Donovan	Ray Donovan	"Fite Nite"	Showtime
2015 (67th)
2015 (67th)	Peter Dinklage	Tyrion Lannister	Game of Thrones	"Hardhome"	HBO
2015 (67th)	Jonathan Banks	Mike Ehrmantraut	Better Call Saul	"Five-O"	AMC
2015 (67th)	Jim Carter	Charles Carson	Downton Abbey	"A Moorland Holiday"	PBS
2015 (67th)	Alan Cumming	Eli Gold	The Good Wife	"Undisclosed Recipients"	CBS
2015 (67th)	Michael Kelly	Doug Stamper	House of Cards	"Chapter 27"	Netflix
2015 (67th)	Ben Mendelsohn	Danny Rayburn	Bloodline	"Part 12"	Netflix
2016 (68th)
2016 (68th)	Ben Mendelsohn	Danny Rayburn	Bloodline	"Part 23"	Netflix
2016 (68th)	Jonathan Banks	Mike Ehrmantraut	Better Call Saul	"Bali Ha'i"	AMC
2016 (68th)	Peter Dinklage	Tyrion Lannister	Game of Thrones	"No One"	HBO
2016 (68th)	Kit Harington	Jon Snow	Game of Thrones	"Battle of the Bastards"	HBO
2016 (68th)	Michael Kelly	Doug Stamper	House of Cards	"Chapter 44"	Netflix
2016 (68th)	Jon Voight	Mickey Donovan	Ray Donovan	"The Kalamazoo"	Showtime
2017 (69th)
2017 (69th)	John Lithgow	Winston Churchill	The Crown	"Assassins"	Netflix
2017 (69th)	Jonathan Banks	Mike Ehrmantraut	Better Call Saul	"Witness"	AMC
2017 (69th)	David Harbour	Jim Hopper	Stranger Things	"Chapter Eight: The Upside Down"	Netflix
2017 (69th)	Ron Cephas Jones	William H. Hill	This Is Us	"Memphis"	NBC
2017 (69th)	Michael Kelly	Doug Stamper	House of Cards	"Chapter 64"	Netflix
2017 (69th)	Mandy Patinkin	Saul Berenson	Homeland	"America First"	Showtime
2017 (69th)	Jeffrey Wright	Bernard Lowe	Westworld	"The Well-Tempered Clavier"	HBO
2018 (70th)
2018 (70th)	Peter Dinklage	Tyrion Lannister	Game of Thrones	"The Dragon and the Wolf"	HBO
2018 (70th)	Nikolaj Coster-Waldau	Jaime Lannister	Game of Thrones	"The Spoils of War"	HBO
2018 (70th)	Joseph Fiennes	Commander Fred Waterford	The Handmaid's Tale	"First Blood"	Hulu
2018 (70th)	David Harbour	Jim Hopper	Stranger Things	"Chapter Four: Will the Wise"	Netflix
2018 (70th)	Mandy Patinkin	Saul Berenson	Homeland	"Species Jump"	Showtime
2018 (70th)	Matt Smith	Prince Philip, Duke of Edinburgh	The Crown	"Mystery Man"	Netflix
2019 (71st)
2019 (71st)	Peter Dinklage	Tyrion Lannister	Game of Thrones	"The Iron Throne"	HBO
2019 (71st)	Alfie Allen	Theon Greyjoy	Game of Thrones	"The Long Night"	HBO
2019 (71st)	Jonathan Banks	Mike Ehrmantraut	Better Call Saul	"Winner"	AMC
2019 (71st)	Nikolaj Coster-Waldau	Jaime Lannister	Game of Thrones	"A Knight of the Seven Kingdoms"	HBO
2019 (71st)	Giancarlo Esposito	Gus Fring	Better Call Saul	"Piñata"	AMC
2019 (71st)	Michael Kelly	Doug Stamper	House of Cards	"Chapter 73"	Netflix
2019 (71st)	Chris Sullivan	Toby Damon	This Is Us	"Toby"	NBC

=== 2020s ===
Year	Actor	Role	Program	Episode Submissions	Network
2020 (72nd)
2020 (72nd)	Billy Crudup	Cory Ellison	The Morning Show	"Chaos Is the New Cocaine"	Apple TV+
2020 (72nd)	Nicholas Braun	Greg Hirsch	Succession	"This Is Not for Tears"	HBO
2020 (72nd)	Kieran Culkin	Roman Roy	Succession	"Tern Haven"	HBO
2020 (72nd)	Mark Duplass	Charles "Chip" Black	The Morning Show	"The Interview"	Apple TV+
2020 (72nd)	Giancarlo Esposito	Gus Fring	Better Call Saul	"JMM"	AMC
2020 (72nd)	Matthew Macfadyen	Tom Wambsgans	Succession	"This Is Not for Tears"	HBO
2020 (72nd)	Bradley Whitford	Commander Joseph Lawrence	The Handmaid's Tale	"Sacrifice"	Hulu
2020 (72nd)	Jeffrey Wright	Bernard Lowe	Westworld	"Crisis Theory"	HBO
2021 (73rd)
2021 (73rd)	Tobias Menzies	Prince Philip, Duke of Edinburgh	The Crown	"Gold Stick"	Netflix
2021 (73rd)	Giancarlo Esposito	Moff Gideon	The Mandalorian	"Chapter 16: The Rescue"	Disney+
2021 (73rd)	O. T. Fagbenle	Luke Bankole	The Handmaid's Tale	"Home"	Hulu
2021 (73rd)	John Lithgow	E.B. Jonathan	Perry Mason	"Chapter 4"	HBO
2021 (73rd)	Max Minghella	Commander Nick Blaine	The Handmaid's Tale	"The Crossing"	Hulu
2021 (73rd)	Chris Sullivan	Toby Damon	This Is Us	"In the Room"	NBC
2021 (73rd)	Bradley Whitford	Commander Joseph Lawrence	The Handmaid's Tale	"Testimony"	Hulu
2021 (73rd)	Michael K. Williams (posthumous)	Montrose Freeman	Lovecraft Country	"Rewind 1921"	HBO
2022 (74th)
2022 (74th)	Matthew Macfadyen	Tom Wambsgans	Succession	"All the Bells Say"	HBO
2022 (74th)	Nicholas Braun	Greg Hirsch	Succession	"Retired Janitors of Idaho"	HBO
2022 (74th)	Billy Crudup	Cory Ellison	The Morning Show	"My Least Favorite Year"	Apple TV+
2022 (74th)	Kieran Culkin	Roman Roy	Succession	"Too Much Birthday"	HBO
2022 (74th)	Park Hae-soo	Cho Sang-woo	Squid Game	"One Lucky Day"	Netflix
2022 (74th)	John Turturro	Irving Bailiff	Severance	"Defiant Jazz"	Apple TV+
2022 (74th)	Christopher Walken	Burt Goodman	Severance	"The Grim Barbarity of Optics and Design"	Apple TV+
2022 (74th)	O Yeong-su	Oh Il-nam	Squid Game	"Gganbu"	Netflix
2023 (75th)
2023 (75th)	Matthew Macfadyen	Tom Wambsgans	Succession	"Tailgate Party"	HBO
2023 (75th)	F. Murray Abraham	Bert Di Grasso	The White Lotus	"Abductions"	HBO
2023 (75th)	Nicholas Braun	Greg Hirsch	Succession	"America Decides"	HBO
2023 (75th)	Michael Imperioli	Dominic Di Grasso	The White Lotus	"That's Amore"	HBO
2023 (75th)	Theo James	Cameron Sullivan	The White Lotus	"That's Amore"	HBO
2023 (75th)	Alan Ruck	Connor Roy	Succession	"Rehearsal"	HBO
2023 (75th)	Will Sharpe	Ethan Spiller	The White Lotus	"Arrivederci"	HBO
2023 (75th)	Alexander Skarsgård	Lukas Matsson	Succession	"Kill List"	HBO
2024 (76th)					HBO
2024 (76th)	Billy Crudup	Cory Ellison	The Morning Show	"Ghost in the Machine"	Apple TV+
2024 (76th)	Tadanobu Asano	Kashigi Yabushige	Shōgun	"Anjin"	FX
2024 (76th)	Mark Duplass	Charles "Chip" Black	The Morning Show	"The Overview Effect"	Apple TV+
2024 (76th)	Jon Hamm	Paul Marks	The Morning Show	"The Green Light"	Apple TV+
2024 (76th)	Takehiro Hira	Ishido Kazunari	Shōgun	"Crimson Sky"	FX
2024 (76th)	Jack Lowden	River Cartwright	Slow Horses	"Hard Lessons"	Apple TV+
2024 (76th)	Jonathan Pryce	Prince Philip, Duke of Edinburgh	The Crown	"Willsmania"	Netflix
2025 (77th)
2025 (77th)	Tramell Tillman	Seth Milchick	Severance	"The After Hours"	Apple TV+
2025 (77th)	Zach Cherry	Dylan George	Severance	"The After Hours"	Apple TV+
2025 (77th)	Walton Goggins	Rick Hatchett	The White Lotus	"Amor Fati"	HBO
2025 (77th)	Jason Isaacs	Timothy Ratliff	The White Lotus	"Amor Fati"	HBO
2025 (77th)	James Marsden	Cal Bradford	Paradise	"The Day"	Hulu
2025 (77th)	Sam Rockwell	Frank	The White Lotus	"Full-Moon Party"	HBO
2025 (77th)	John Turturro	Irving Bailiff	Severance	"Woe's Hollow"	Apple TV+
2026 (78th)
2026 (78th)	Tom Pelphrey	Robbie Prendergrast	Task	"Vagrants"	HBO
2026 (78th)	Patrick Ball	Dr. Frank Langdon	The Pitt	"8:00 P.M."	HBO Max
2026 (78th)	Billy Crudup	Cory Ellison	The Morning Show	"The Parent Trap"	Apple TV
2026 (78th)	Shawn Hatosy	Dr. Jack Abbot	The Pitt	"9:00 P.M."	HBO Max
2026 (78th)	Gerran Howell	Dennis Whitaker	The Pitt	"7:00 P.M."	HBO Max
2026 (78th)	Jack Lowden	River Cartwright	Slow Horses	"Circus"	Apple TV
2026 (78th)	Carlos Manuel Vesga	Manousos Oviedo	Pluribus	"The Gap"	Apple TV

== Programs with multiple wins ==
4 wins

- Game of Thrones (2 consecutive)
- L.A. Law (3 consecutive)
- The West Wing (3 consecutive)

3 wins

- Breaking Bad (2 consecutive)
- The Andy Griffith Show (consecutive)
- Hill Street Blues (2 consecutive)
- Picket Fences (consecutive)

2 wins

- Caesar's Hour
- The Crown
- The Jackie Gleason Show
- Gunsmoke
- Lost
- The Morning Show
- The Rockford Files (consecutive)
- The Sopranos (consecutive)
- Succession (consecutive)

== Programs with multiple nominations ==
16 nominations

- Hill Street Blues

15 nominations

- L.A. Law

14 nominations

- The West Wing

12 nominations

- Game of Thrones

10 nominations

- Succession

9 nominations

- The Sopranos

8 nominations

- ER
- Lost

7 nominations

- Breaking Bad
- The Morning Show
- St. Elsewhere
- The White Lotus

6 nominations

- Better Call Saul
- Boston Legal
- Lou Grant
- The Rockford Files
- The Waltons

5 nominations

- Chicago Hope
- Downton Abbey
- The Handmaid's Tale
- I Love Lucy
- Mad Men
- NYPD Blue
- Picket Fences
- Severance
- thirtysomething

4 nominations

- The Crown
- Damages
- The Good Wife
- Homeland
- House of Cards
- Magnum, P.I.
- Marcus Welby, M.D.
- Northern Exposure
- The Practice
- Quantum Leap

3 nominations

- Alias
- The Andy Griffith Show
- Caesar's Hour
- Cagney & Lacey
- Gunsmoke
- The Jackie Gleason Show
- Law & Order
- Mission: Impossible
- The Pitt
- Star Trek
- The Streets of San Francisco
- This Is Us

2 nominations

- Ben Casey
- Bloodline
- Dragnet
- The Glass Menagerie
- Holocaust
- Huff
- The Man from U.N.C.L.E.
- Men of a Certain Age
- Miami Vice
- Perry Mason
- The Phil Silvers Show
- Ray Donovan
- Rich Man, Poor Man
- Shōgun
- Slow Horses
- Squid Game
- Stranger Things
- Westworld

== Performers with multiple wins ==
4 wins

- Peter Dinklage (2 consecutive)

3 wins

- Art Carney (consecutive)
- Don Knotts (consecutive)
- Aaron Paul

2 wins

- Michael Conrad (consecutive)
- Billy Crudup
- Larry Drake (consecutive)
- Matthew Macfadyen (consecutive)
- Stuart Margolin (consecutive)
- Carl Reiner (consecutive)
- Ray Walston (consecutive)

== Performers with multiple nominations ==
8 nominations

- Peter Dinklage

6 nominations

- Jonathan Banks (Note: Jonathan Banks was the first of only two actors with nominations as a main cast member for three different shows in this category, two of which feature him as the same character)
- Ed Begley Jr.
- Will Geer
- Michael Imperioli
- Jimmy Smits
- Bruce Weitz

5 nominations

- William Frawley
- Aaron Paul
- William Shatner
- John Spencer
- Bradley Whitford
- Noah Wyle

4 nominations

- James Brolin
- Timothy Busfield
- Art Carney
- Jim Carter
- Michael Conrad
- Billy Crudup
- Richard Dysart
- Héctor Elizondo
- Michael Emerson
- Giancarlo Esposito (Note: Giancarlo Esposito is the second of only two actors with nominations as a main cast member for three different shows in this category, two of which feature him as the same character)
- John Hillerman
- Michael Kelly
- Mandy Patinkin
- Carl Reiner
- John Slattery
- Dean Stockwell

3 nominations

- Mason Adams
- Noah Beery Jr.
- Nicholas Braun
- Michael Douglas
- Larry Drake
- Paul Ford
- Victor Garber
- John Karlen
- Don Knotts
- Eriq La Salle
- Matthew Macfadyen
- Greg Morris
- Leonard Nimoy
- Terry O'Quinn
- Richard Schiff
- Robert Walden
- Ray Walston

2 nominations

- Alan Alda
- Ben Alexander
- Michael Badalucco
- Andre Braugher
- David Burns
- Leo G. Carroll
- Josh Charles
- Dominic Chianese
- Gordon Clapp
- Barry Corbin
- Nikolaj Coster-Waldau
- Kieran Culkin
- Alan Cumming
- Mark Duplass
- Fyvush Finkel
- Walton Goggins
- Charles Haid
- David Harbour
- Steve Harris
- Steven Hill
- John Lithgow
- Jack Lowden
- Stuart Margolin
- Ben Mendelsohn
- Edward James Olmos
- Oliver Platt
- Chris Sullivan
- John Turturro
- Nicholas Turturro
- Jon Voight
- Dennis Weaver
- Jeffrey Wright

== See also ==
- Primetime Emmy Award for Outstanding Lead Actor in a Comedy Series
- Primetime Emmy Award for Outstanding Lead Actress in a Comedy Series
- Primetime Emmy Award for Outstanding Supporting Actor in a Comedy Series
- Primetime Emmy Award for Outstanding Supporting Actress in a Comedy Series
- Primetime Emmy Award for Outstanding Lead Actor in a Drama Series
- Primetime Emmy Award for Outstanding Lead Actress in a Drama Series
- Primetime Emmy Award for Outstanding Supporting Actress in a Drama Series
- Primetime Emmy Award for Outstanding Lead Actor in a Limited or Anthology Series or Movie
- Primetime Emmy Award for Outstanding Lead Actress in a Limited or Anthology Series or Movie
- Primetime Emmy Award for Outstanding Supporting Actor in a Limited or Anthology Series or Movie
- Primetime Emmy Award for Outstanding Supporting Actress in a Limited or Anthology Series or Movie
- Golden Globe Award for Best Supporting Actor – Series, Miniseries or Television Film
