= Ways and Means (The West Wing) =

- The West Wing episode
- Episode no.: Season 3 Episode 3
- Directed by: Alex Graves
- Story by: Eli Attie; Gene Sperling
- Teleplay by: Aaron Sorkin
- Production code: 227203
- Original air date: October 24, 2001

Guest appearances
- Oliver Platt as Oliver Babish; Ron Silver as Bruno Gianelli; Emily Procter as Ainsley Hayes; Connie Britton as Connie Tate; Evan Handler as Doug Wegland; Mark Feuerstein as Cliff Calley; Miguel Sandoval as Victor Campos; Nicole Robinson as Margaret Hooper; Nicholas Pryor as Special Prosecutor Clement Rollins; Thom Barry as Congressman Mark Richardson

Episode chronology
← Previous "Manchester (Part II)"	Next → "On the Day Before"
- The West Wing season 3

"Ways and Means" is the 47th The West Wing episode and 3rd of the third season. It originally aired on NBC on October 24, 2001. The episode sees the beginnings of President Bartlet's Congressional hearings, as well as negotiations over the estate tax. Written by Aaron Sorkin, Eli Attie and Gene Sperling, and directed by Alex Graves, the episode contains the first appearances by Mark Feuerstein as Clifford "Cliff" Calley. There are also guest appearances by Thom Barry, Nicholas Pryor and Miguel Sandoval.

== Plot ==
The subpoenas are handed out in the hearing over Bartlet's concealment of his multiple sclerosis. The special prosecutor, Clement Rollins (Pryor), appears to be both fair and responsible, but C.J. believes the White House will be better served in the public eye if investigated by a partisan agent. She therefore decides—against the strong objections of White House counsel Oliver Babish—to present Rollins as an ally of the administration, thereby forcing Congress to take control over the investigation. Meanwhile Donna, unwittingly, becomes entangled in potential problems over the hearings. Ainsley Hayes sets her up on a date with the Republican House Government Oversight Committee counsel Clifford Calley, but even though the date seems to go well, Calley then leaves her quite abruptly in the middle of the street. Donna later realizes the reason: his congressional committee is the one that will be in charge of the investigation, and a relationship between the two could constitute a conflict of interest.

While Sam and Bruno are concerned about the loyalty of a powerful California union official (Sandoval), Toby and Josh are preparing for a meeting with the congressional opposition to re-negotiate the estate tax—or the "death tax" as the Republicans have labeled it—but are then surprised by a last-minute cancellation. It soon becomes clear that the Republicans are planning to repeal the estate tax altogether, and might have the votes to do so. An attempt to win over the black caucus, led by Congressman Mark Richardson (Barry), fails. At a loss over what to do, an initiative comes from unexpected quarters. The previously over-cautious political strategist, Doug Wegland, suggests the president responds by doing something he has never done before: veto the bill.

President Bartlet himself is confronted with a forest fire in Wyoming, and decides to follow the counter-intuitive advice of his experts, and let the fire burn. Meanwhile, he is still struggling to deal with the death of his perennial personal secretary, Mrs. Landingham. Charlie insists that it is necessary to appoint a new person to fill the position, but the president is reluctant to take the step. As the episode ends, Bartlet is searching for a good pen, and realizes the full depth of his dependence on Mrs. Landingham.

== Production ==
According to Sorkin, the episode benefited greatly from input by two former White House employees. The scene where Donna stays up all night sorting through documents in cartons was the idea of Eli Attie, Al Gore's chief speechwriter. Meanwhile Gene Sperling, Bill Clinton's chief economic adviser, came up with the sub-plot involving the estate tax. Sorkin, however, had certain misgivings about the estate tax story's appeal, considering the prevalent bipartisan spirit of the time, in the aftermath of the 9/11 attacks.

In one scene Sam Seaborn speaks to a Latino labor leader, and as the discussion heats up he switches into Spanish. The lobbyist, Victor Campos, claims that he has been used for public relations purposes, something Sam denies. Rob Lowe, who plays Seaborn, had to learn to speak the language convincingly especially for this episode. Sorkin commented, "I tend to torture Rob a little."
