= On the Day Before =

- The West Wing episode
- The president interrupts the Nobel laureate dinner to deal with an international crisis.
- Episode no.: Season 3 Episode 5
- Directed by: Christopher Misiano
- Story by: Paul Redford; Nanda Chitre
- Teleplay by: Aaron Sorkin
- Production code: 227204
- Original air date: October 31, 2001

Guest appearances
- Anna Deavere Smith as National Security Advisor Nancy McNally; Kevin Tighe as Gov. Jack Buckland, D-IN; H. Richard Greene as Rep. Robert Royce, R-PA; Cliff DeYoung as Rep. Kimball, D-TN; NiCole Robinson as Margaret Hooper; Scott Michael Campbell as Donald Dolan; John F. O'Donohue as Mr. Koveleskie; Mary Mara as Sherri Wexler; Thomas Kopache as Assistant Secretary of State Bob Slatterly

Episode chronology
← Previous "Ways and Means"	Next → "War Crimes"
- The West Wing season 3

"On the Day Before" is the forty-eighth The West Wing episode and fourth of the third season. It originally aired on NBC on October 31, 2001. The episode deals with a suicide bomber in Jerusalem, as well as continued negotiations over the estate tax. Written by Aaron Sorkin, Paul Redford, and Nanda Chitre, and directed by Christopher Misiano, the episode contains the first appearances by H. Richard Greene as Congressman Robert Royce and Thomas Kopache as Assistant Secretary of State Bob "Bobby" Slatterly. There are also guest appearances by Kevin Tighe, Cliff DeYoung and Mary Mara. Janel Moloney was nominated for an Emmy Award for her performance in this episode.

== Plot ==
The White House is hosting a dinner for Nobel laureates but the staff keep getting interrupted by various domestic and international crises. As President Bartlet vetoes the bill to repeal the estate tax, it appears that the Republican Party might have the two-thirds majority needed to override the veto. A representative of the dissenting Democrats is brought in to negotiate a deal with Toby and Sam. Meanwhile, Josh is meeting with Indiana Governor Jack Buckland (Tighe) to talk him out of a potential primary challenge against Bartlet. Leo is at this point getting exasperated by their own partisans taking advantage of the administration's weakness due to the impending hearings over the president's concealment of his multiple sclerosis. He tells Josh to "throw an elbow" and threaten to leak the fact that Buckland tried to blackmail the president. In the end, Josh ends up striking a compromise, while it is Toby and Sam who "throw an elbow" by turning down Democratic Congressman Kimble and offering the same deal to moderate Republican Congressman Robert Royce instead.

A Palestinian suicide bomber in Jerusalem causes the death of several Israelis, as well as two American nationals. National Security Advisor Nancy McNally and Leo consider the potential implications of possible retributions and are relieved when the Palestinians respond to American pressure by arresting a leader of a militant group. As Leo points out, however, the solution is likely to be only temporary.

Other staff members have their own problems to deal with. Charlie has been offered immunity from the special prosecutors and Leo, among others, suggests he take it. Charlie, however, insists that he will "stay with [his] team". Donna, who in the previous episode ("Ways and Means") went on a date with a Republican congressional aide involved in the investigation, comes clean with Josh. It turns out she met him not only once, but also on another occasion after she had found out what position he held, and Josh is not pleased. C.J. is provoked by an inexperienced lifestyle reporter, Sherri Wexler (Mara), trying to put her in a bad light and responds by embarrassing her in front of a full press room.

== Production ==
The West Wing episodes were written close to production and at the time of the September 11 attacks Sorkin was writing on episode six of the season ("Gone Quiet"), which originally was to air on Halloween (October 31). The events caused consternation in the writing staff, and the episode had to be entirely rewritten. "I was kind of paralyzed," said Sorkin, "I didn't know what to write". Because of the attacks, air dates were postponed and the already finished "On the Day Before" became the Halloween episode instead. Nevertheless, the episode took on greater relevance to actual, international events than the writers had intended. On August 9, after the actors had just done a cold reading of the episode, they were informed about the Sbarro restaurant suicide bombing, a Jerusalem suicide bombing in which an American was killed. The close similarity to an event in the script came as a shock to the actors. "It was mind-blowing," said Richard Schiff (Toby).

== Social and cultural references ==
The title of this episode refers to a conversation that the President has with his staff towards the end of the episode. In it, he tells his staff that at a White House dinner, someone told him that on Yom Kippur Jews ask God for forgiveness, but "on the day before" Yom Kippur, called Erev Yom Kippur, Jews ask forgiveness from one another. The president remarks that "you can't ask forgiveness of God until you've asked forgiveness of people on the day before."

In a reference to the Palestinian leadership, Chairman of the Palestine Liberation Organization Yasser Arafat is mentioned by name. Even though foreign dignitaries were normally fictional on the show, producer Aaron Sorkin said it felt right to call the Chairman by his real name "'cause Arafat's been around forever and he'll be around forever". In a later episode, however ("Gaza" in season five), the name of the Chairman of the Palestinian Authority was changed to Nizar Farad, a fictional character. By that point in mid-2004, Arafat was in failing health in real life, and would die in November 2004. The show continued to use the Farad character and never made any references to Arafat's successor Mahmoud Abbas.

When the president vetoes the bill, it is said that this is Bartlet's first veto. In a previous episode, "In This White House" as Sam debates Ainsley Hayes for the first time, it is made clear that the president has in fact previously vetoed a bill. It has been suggested, however, that what was discussed on that occasion was a pocket veto.

At one point in the episode, Josh quotes an interview with one of Buckland's aides in what he calls the Indianapolis Post-Dispatch. No such newspaper exists. The show chose to combine the names of two different newspapers: the Indianapolis Star, and the St. Louis Post-Dispatch.

== Reception ==
It was for this episode, along with "War Crimes", that Janel Moloney was nominated for the Primetime Emmy Award for Outstanding Supporting Actress in a Drama Series in 2002. In this category she was up against two of her co-stars: Mary-Louise Parker and Stockard Channing, who went on to win the award. Deborah of Television Without Pity gave the episode a grade of "A".
