= Bartlet for America =

- The West Wing episode
- Episode no.: Season 3 Episode 9
- Directed by: Thomas Schlamme
- Written by: Aaron Sorkin
- Production code: 227210
- Original air date: December 12, 2001

Guest appearances
- Joanna Gleason as Atty. Jordon Kendall; Mark Feuerstein as Atty. Cliff Calley; David St. James as Congressman Darren Gibson; Kathryn Joosten as Mrs. Landingham

Episode chronology
| ← Previous "The Women of Qumar" | Next → "H. Con-172" |
- The West Wing season 3

"Bartlet for America" is the ninth episode of the third season of American serial political drama The West Wing. The episode aired on December 12, 2001 on NBC. The episode features Leo McGarry, the White House Chief of Staff, testifying before a congressional committee after it is revealed that the administration has been covering up the President's multiple sclerosis. Reception of the episode was mostly positive, and the slogan of "Bartlet for America" has been reprised in popular culture and real-life American politics.

== Plot ==
The episode centers around the continuation of a storyline in which Democratic President Josiah Bartlet publicly admits that he was diagnosed with multiple sclerosis and concealed it from the public throughout his campaign for the presidency. As a result, Leo McGarry has been served with a subpoena to testify before Congress as a high-ranking official in the Bartlet campaign and one of Bartlet's closest friends.

Leo is asked by the committee how he initially persuaded Jed Bartlet to run for office. In a flashback, Leo stops by Bartlet's office as Governor of New Hampshire. In trying to persuade him to run for President, Leo pulls out a cocktail napkin and sticks it on a nearby easel, revealing that it reads "Bartlet for America".

Congressman Darren Gibson forces Leo to admit that Bartlet had a previously undisclosed multiple sclerosis "attack" while campaigning for office, prompting Jordon Kendall, Leo's lawyer to call for a recess. In private, Leo tells Jordon that on the night of the third debate, he was meeting with Gibson, then a CEO, and two other wealthy individuals to solicit funds for the campaign. When offered a drink Leo tries to demur without revealing that he is a recovering alcoholic, but ends up having a glass of scotch and subsequently falls off the wagon. After the others leave, Leo proceeds to get drunk and forgets about the debate, and when Gibson returns—having forgotten his briefcase—he sees the empty bottles Leo has left on the table. Attempting to deflect, Leo blurts out that Bartlet has "collapsed," which is how Josh Lyman characterized the attack to Leo over the phone.

Meanwhile, the Republican House Majority Leader and Majority Counsel Cliff Calley have pulled Gibson into another room, where he tells them the same story. Calley accuses Gibson of using an irrelevant story to publicly embarrass Leo. Gibson makes no attempt to deny this, stating his only intent is to win. Disgusted, Calley urges the Majority Leader to postpone the hearings until after the Christmas holidays. The Majority Leader allows Gibson to resume, but then abruptly changes his mind and postpones.

Returning to the White House, Leo is met by President Bartlet, who gives him a Christmas present: the original "Bartlet for America" napkin in a picture frame. "That was awfully nice of you", says the President, before leaving. The episode closes with Leo crying at his desk.

== Cast ==
- Martin Sheen as Josiah Bartlet, the President of the United States
- John Spencer as Leo McGarry, the White House Chief of Staff
- Bradley Whitford as Josh Lyman, the Deputy White House Chief of Staff
- Janel Moloney as Donna Moss, the assistant to Josh Lyman
- Dulé Hill as Charlie Young, the Personal Aide to the President
- Richard Schiff as Toby Ziegler, the White House Communications Director
- Allison Janney as C. J. Cregg, the White House Press Secretary
- Rob Lowe as Sam Seaborn, the Deputy White House Communications Director

== Reception ==
The "Bartlet for America" cocktail napkin and slogan has seen significance and reprisal beyond the episode it was featured in.

The tagline "Bartlet for America" and the napkin have seen enduring significance since the show's airing, with Vulture referring to the episode as, in part, "the saga of the fateful napkin". The Nevada Independent writes that when then-Congresswoman Jacky Rosen was "fairly certain" that she would campaign in the 2018 United States Senate election in Nevada, she asked her daughter about the prospect. She responded by writing "Rosen for Senate" on a napkin, which is currently preserved in the Rosens' home. Steve Heisler with The A.V. Club, however, made a point of distinguishing a slogan that advertised the candidate for a people rather than an office, comparing "Bartlet for America" to "Bartlet for President". Heisler argues that in writing "Bartlet for America", Leo signaled that he thought Josiah Bartlet was the best man to strengthen the nation, and not just the best man for the presidency. A later article in The A.V. Club by Sonia Saraiya would argue that Bartlet's re-election campaign, as well as "Bartlet for America", served as the fictional precursor to and foundation for Barack Obama's presidential campaigns and "Obama for America".

Heisler further commented in a 2010 article that the show was really about Leo, despite its title. He praised John Spencer's acting during the episode, calling it his "best episode by far" and noting his capacity for emotional range as well as dry wit.

Ben Travers, writing for IndieWire, listed the episode as one of fifteen episodes to "Binge View In Celebration of America". Travers quipped that if NBC had sold framed "Bartlet for America' napkins, they would have made more of a profit than their selling Friends coffee mugs. He also commented that the scene with Cliff Calley and Gibson was not realistic, but that Sorkin made it believable through "impeccable timing, careful framing, and touching performances".

The napkin would later reappear in the series finale (May 14, 2006) and as a prop in A West Wing Special to Benefit When We All Vote, a 2020 benefit production of Hartsfield's Landing.

In 2019, NBC News noted that Wayne Messam, the mayor of Miramar, Florida, had a campaign logo for the 2020 United States presidential election that read "Wayne for America", which the outlet commented was "not dissimilar" to "Bartlet for America".
