= Isaac and Ishmael =

Non-canonical episode of The West Wing

- The West Wing episode
- Episode no.: Season 3 Episode 0
- Directed by: Christopher Misiano
- Written by: Aaron Sorkin
- Original air date: October 3, 2001

Guest appearance
- Ajay Naidu as Rakim Ali

Episode chronology
| ← Previous "Two Cathedrals" | Next → "Manchester" |
- The West Wing season 3

"Isaac and Ishmael" is a non-canonical episode of the American political drama series The West Wing, usually considered part of its third season. The episode, first aired on October 3, 2001 on NBC, was inspired by the September 11 attacks that had taken place less than a month before.

== Synopsis ==
Prior to the episode, the show's actors directly address the audience; they state that the episode is a "play" outside the show's normal continuity and provide donation hotlines for victims of the September 11 attacks.

The White House is placed into lockdown (referred to as a "crash") after a staffer, Rakim Ali, is found to share a name with the alias of a suspected terrorist. A group of high schoolers, touring the White House as part of Presidential Classroom, are stuck in the cafeteria; Deputy Chief of Staff Josh Lyman and other staffers entertain the group with a discussion on the causes of Islamist terrorism. At the same time, Chief of Staff Leo McGarry argues with Ali during the latter's interrogation. Eventually, the suspected terrorist is found in Germany and the lockdown is lifted, prompting McGarry to apologize to the staffer.

== Production ==
The third season premiere for The West Wing, the first part of the two-parter "Manchester," was originally scheduled for September 26. The episode had already been completed by the time the September 11 attacks took place. A week before the scheduled premiere, showrunner Aaron Sorkin started writing "Isaac and Ishmael"; he convinced the network, NBC, to show a rerun on September 26, "Isaac and Ishmael" on October 3, and part one of "Manchester" on October 10. The New York Times described NBC's decision to show the rerun after it had already widely promoted "Manchester" as "a $10 million act of largess."

"Isaac and Ishmael" had the quickest production turnaround for a West Wing episode. Many elements typical of West Wing episodes do not show up in the episode: there are two plotlines instead of the usual four, there is less snappy back-and-forth dialogue, and characters are largely confined to one of two rooms, eschewing the "walk and talk." Only one previous West Wing storyline, the attempted assassination of Charles Young in "What Kind of Day Has It Been," is referenced.

== Themes ==
The September 11 attacks are never directly referenced in this or any other episode of The West Wing.

A succession of characters take the role of "teacher" or "lecturer" in the cafeteria scene, giving long explanations of the nature of terrorism and the ways the United States should respond. Some characters, during their time as metaphorical teacher, seem to support specific real-world government policies. Lyman's and Toby Ziegler's explanations—Lyman comparing the terrorists to the Ku Klux Klan and Ziegler comparing the Taliban to the Nazis—echo the George W. Bush administration's reasoning for invading Afghanistan. C. J. Cregg, by arguing for phone tapping and increased intelligence funding, is implicitly supporting the real-world Patriot Act.

For most of the episode, Leo McGarry is depicted as angry, paranoid, and racist; this is at odds with his usual characterization as cool-headed and straightforward. Sorkin intended it as a depiction of how easily people are "pushed right over the line of racism."

== Reception ==
"Isaac and Ishmael" had the highest viewership of any West Wing episode, and was the highest viewed show that week. The episode was met with mixed reviews, with many describing its tone as "pedagogical" or "preachy." Tom Shales, writing for The Washington Post, criticized the focus on Islamophobia, lamenting that "even in this moment of pain, trauma, heartbreak, destruction, assault and victimization, Hollywood liberals can still find some excuse to make America look guilty."

In a retrospective review, The A.V. Club's Steve Heisler unfavorably compared "Isaac and Ishmael" to a Lifetime original movie, though concluded that the episode was important for its moment as "no one was really in a place where they could think about things intelligently, or rationally" in the wake of the September 11 attacks.
