= Manchester (The West Wing) =

- The West Wing episodes
- The staff look on in anticipation as Bartlet makes his announcement.
- Episode nos.: Season 3 Episodes 1 & 2
- Directed by: Thomas Schlamme
- Written by: Aaron Sorkin
- Production codes: 227201 & 227202
- Original air dates: October 10, 2001; October 17, 2001

Guest appearances
- Oliver Platt as Oliver Babish; Ron Silver as Bruno Gianelli; Marlee Matlin as Joey Lucas; Anna Deavere Smith as National Security Advisor Nancy McNally; Evan Handler as Doug Wegland; Connie Britton as Connie Tate; NiCole Robinson as Margaret Hooper; Renee Estevez as Nancy; Bill O'Brien as Kenny Thurman; Victor McCay as Henry; Jim Beaver as Carl; Earl Boen as Paulson; Glenn Morshower as Mike Chysler

Episode chronology
← Previous "Two Cathedrals"	Next → "Ways and Means"
- The West Wing season 3

"Manchester" is the two-part third-season premiere of the American political drama television series The West Wing. The episodes aired on October 10 and 17, 2001 on NBC. The episodes deal with President Bartlet's decision to run for re-election, and the activities of the weeks leading up to his official announcement. Both parts were written by Aaron Sorkin and directed by Thomas Schlamme, and the episodes contain the first appearances by Ron Silver, Evan Handler and Connie Britton. These episodes also mark the first episode where Stockard Channing is added to opening credits, marking that she became a regular character this season. The second episode was an Emmy nominee for Outstanding Art Direction for a Single-Camera Series. It also earned a Golden Reel Award nomination for Best Sound Editing in a Television Series.

== Plot ==
The episode picks up at the press conference immediately where last season's cliff-hanger ("Two Cathedrals") left off, and what was then only implicit is here made clear: President Bartlet is running for a second term. When asked if he plans to seek re-election, he answers "Yeah, and I'm going to win." From that point on the story develops in dual storylines, one following immediately upon the press conference, the other taking place four weeks later, as the staff is preparing for the official campaign announcement in Manchester, New Hampshire.

Leo decides to bring in Bruno Gianelli (Silver), a highly accomplished political consultant, to help with the re-election campaign, but conflict soon arises between Gianelli's and Bartlet's respective staffs. The conflict is particularly intense between the idealistic communications director, Toby, and the more pragmatic Doug Wegland (Handler). A problem appears when it becomes clear that RU-486 – an emergency contraception – will receive government approval on the same day as the announcement ceremony. This will not only take attention away from the event, but also give political ammunition to the Right, and raise questions about the professionalism of the campaign. Josh strongly wants to "wave off the FDA" on the release, and it later appears that his underlying motive for this is to rectify a previous mistake. In the early part of the story, he applied pressure to pass a bill on anti-tobacco measures, but Gianelli points out the error in passing a bill that could have given them political leverage against the Republicans in the upcoming election.

In the ongoing conflict in Haiti, a rescue mission is staged to save American citizens. Bartlet decides to send in peacekeeping troops, in spite of political consequences. C.J., increasingly frustrated by the press's insistent focus on the President's multiple sclerosis announcement, blunders during a press briefing on the mission by stating "the President's relieved to be focusing on something that matters". Leo responds by sitting her out for the next press briefing, and she reacts by offering her resignation. She is eventually persuaded to stay by the President, who assures her that she is a vital member of his administration.

Bartlet's wife Abbey is not pleased with the President making his bid for re-election without consulting her, but later decides to join him in Manchester. She tells him that he needs to reach out to his staff, some of whom believe that he should make a public apology for concealing his MS. In the end he makes the apology, not publicly, but privately to his nearest advisers. He assures them that, even though Gianelli's help is much needed, they will still run a campaign that does not shrink from handling controversial issues. In a final speech he tells them that "we’re going to write a new book. Right here. Right now."

== Production and cultural references ==
The scenes purporting to be in Manchester were not shot in New Hampshire, in spite of lobbying from local residents. John Spencer, who played Leo McGarry on the show, said: "I certainly understand where the people from New Hampshire are coming from. But I think it's logistics. New Hampshire is not close enough". For financial reasons the producers decided to film the outside parts of the episodes in Bluemont, Virginia instead. The town was said to have the "quiet streets, a mix of mostly older architectural styles, fieldstone fences, and breathtaking views of rolling countryside" that the show was looking for. The hotel that the staff stayed in and is in the background of some of the scenes in the episode is The Red Fox Inn in Middleburg, VA. The house chosen – out of 55 contenders – to pass as the president's farmhouse, was the home of Purcellville mayor John Marsh. Marsh's friends and neighbours also appear as extras in the crowd scenes.

For the sub-plot about the morning-after pill, former Clinton economic adviser Gene Sperling was brought in for consultation. Such a drug, called Mifepristone, was in fact approved in the United States in September 2000; one of the last months of the Clinton presidency. Also the political issues related to Haiti have close parallels to an episode in the Clinton presidency: the return of President Jean-Bertrand Aristide to power by the United States in 1994.

== Reception ==
The second episode was an Emmy nominee for Outstanding Art Direction for a Single-Camera Series. It also earned a Golden Reel Award nomination for Best Sound Editing in Television Series. The two episodes were also nominated for Series Storyline at the 2002 SHINE Awards, a prize awarded for "accurate and honest portrayals of sexuality".

Jenny Halper, writing for UGO, was less than impressed with the pre-season special episode, and wrote that "the season really kicks off" with the "flashback intensive" "Manchester"-episodes. Britt Gillette, of The DVD Report, counted "Manchester Part I" among the more dramatic episodes on the show, with special reference to C.J.'s blunder, and the debate over the president's apology. Deborah of Television Without Pity gave both episodes the grade "A". The A.V. Club's Steve Heisler gave the two episodes a B+. He believed these two episodes were "meant to center the characters and the audience" after the previous season, ending in the season finale "Two Cathedrals". "And like most things on The West Wing," he continued, "it’s a long, messy, spectacular road to a perfect (likely quippy) end."
