= Ainsley Hayes =

American television character, created 2000

- The West Wing character
- Emily Procter as Ainsley Hayes
- First appearance: "In This White House" season 2, episode 4
- Last appearance: "Requiem" season 7, episode 18
- Created by: Aaron Sorkin
- Portrayed by: Emily Procter

In-universe information
- Occupation: Associate White House counsel (seasons 2–3); Deputy White House counsel (season 3)
- Nationality: American
- Alma mater: Smith College; Harvard Law School

Ainsley Hayes is a fictional character played by Emily Procter on The West Wing, an American serial political drama. Primarily appearing in the second and third seasons for a total of twelve episodes, Ainsley served as the Associate White House Counsel under the show's president, Josiah Bartlet. Reception for Ainsley has ranged from mixed to positive; she is characterized as smart and flirtatious, but also vulnerable to sexism from other characters.

== Creation and development ==
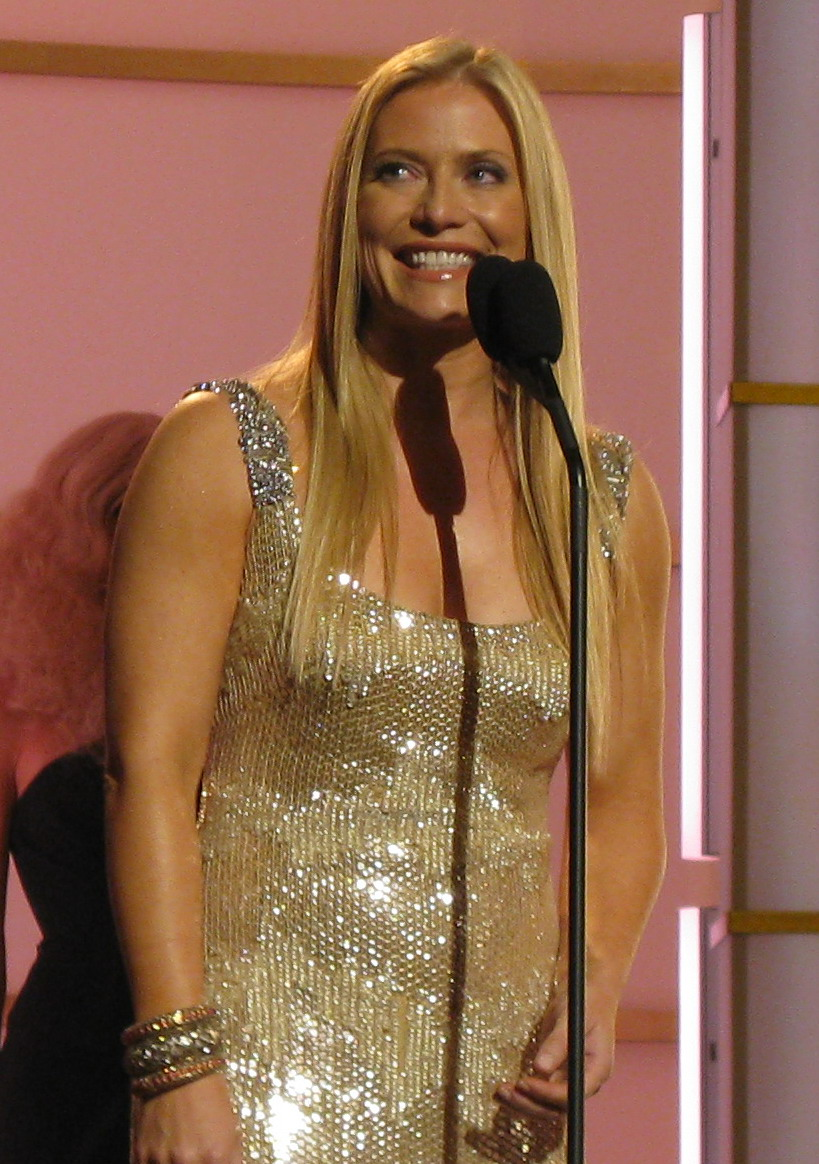
Emily Procter's peculiar outfit forced her to re-audition for the role of Ainsley Hayes before getting the part.

Ainsley Hayes first appears in The West Wing's second season, in the 2000 episode "In This White House". Emily Procter, then a struggling actress in a Beverly Hills apartment, read for the role. She later told Empire magazine that she had driven a run-down car to the audition. She also recalled that her "strange, pulled-together outfit", which included purple pants, caused her to have to come back and repeat the audition.

Ainsley was originally scripted as a Republican from the western state of Montana, but Procter read her lines with a Southern accent. On Procter's first day of work, the show's creator, Aaron Sorkin, asked her whether she would like the character to be from North Carolina instead. She accepted, later remarking that it was "such a sweet thing to do".

Sorkin wrote in the official companion book to The West Wing that Ainsley was created to attract younger women to the show. However, he also commented that she was intended to counter a trend he perceived at the time in which "young, blond, and leggy" Republican women frequently worked as unintelligent commentators. Indeed, Ainsley's character has drawn multiple comparisons to real-life American political commentator Ann Coulter, but Sorkin counters that "Ainsley Hayes has an extraordinary sense of duty. When her president asks her to serve, she agrees, which makes her perfect for us". In Ainsley's first scene, the other characters assume she embodies the stereotype, with Sam Seaborn referring to her as a "young, blonde, leggy Republican". The characters are then proved mistaken when Ainsley reveals her prowess as a debater.

Ainsley never became a regular character on the show; Sorkin was concerned about the feasibility of including another character in every episode, telling Empire magazine that he "already had eight mouths to feed". In the end, Sorkin regretted his decision to not incorporate Ainsley, calling it the biggest mistake he had made in the show's seven-season run. For her part, Procter had expressed a desire to become a regular character early on. She later commented that it was something of a miscommunication, stating that "If I had in any way known that this was a possibility, I would have stayed there forever! They would've had to kick me out!" Ainsley's character disappeared after the third season, with a reappearance in the seventh season episode "Requiem"; she appeared in a total of twelve episodes. After her time on The West Wing, Procter was quickly picked up for a part on CSI: Miami.

== Character role ==
On The West Wing, Ainsley Hayes serves as the Associate White House Counsel. She was introduced to the show on a fictional political television program known as Capitol Beat. Despite demeaning comments from those around her, Ainsley gives Sam Seaborn a humiliating defeat in the "spin battle"; the president, Democrat Josiah Bartlet, chooses to hire Ainsley, sensing her intellect and sense of civic duty despite her conservatism. Ainsley had a promising future as a Republican political pundit, but, as she remarked to the White House counsel furious over her hiring, she wanted to "roll up [her] sleeves, set aside partisanship, and say 'what can I do?'"

Ainsley is shown to have, as one reviewer put it, a "smart, conservative, principled voice". In "The Lame Duck Congress", Ainsley dresses down Republican staffers who question her viewpoint on a nuclear test ban treaty, with Ainsley countering that they themselves don't necessarily oppose the treaty, but they want to score political points by killing the treaty's ratification. In another episode, when Sam asks Ainsley to summarize a 22-page paper on a commerce amendment in two pages, Ainsley reverses Sam's position and convinces him of her own viewpoint; she also argues with Sam on the Equal Rights Amendment in the second-season episode "17 People", calling it "humiliating" to believe that a law is needed to declare a woman equal to a man. In another episode, Ainsley prevents Sam from disclosing privileged information to force an oil company to pay for a cleanup, which she argued could have gotten him disbarred.

Ainsley and Sam also engage in flirtation over the course of the show; for example, in "Bartlet's Third State of the Union", Ainsley asks Sam to dance with her while wearing a robe and playing "Blame It on the Bossa Nova" in her office. The flirtation led Steve Heisler of The A.V. Club, in a 2010 episode-by-episode review of the show, to quip "when are they going to bone already?" Author Patrick Webster, in a footnote, speculates that the two characters were having sex already, in considering the second-season episode "17 People".

Ainsley is also portrayed as a voracious eater; as early as her second episode, Procter remarked that her character was "eating everybody else's leftovers". Procter commented, to her shock, that this was something Sorkin must have observed in her, as Procter's own appetite was well-known in her family. Jon White, a fan who created a website devoted to "17 People", told Vox that her eating habit was a "Quasi-Manic Pixie Dream Girl Quirk Trait™" of Ainsley's, along with her obsession with Gilbert and Sullivan.

=== Sexism ===
Ainsley is sometimes the subject of denigration and misogyny from characters on the show. In addition to Sam calling her a "young, blonde, leggy Republican" who "didn't know anything" before losing to her on Capitol Beat, she was also referred to as a "blond and leggy fascist", a "baton twirler", and a "sex kitten" by various characters on the show. After the first segment of Capitol Beat, Josh yells to Toby, "come quick—Sam's getting his ass kicked by a girl". In another incident, after speaking to two male staffers who dislike her aggressive tone, they leave her a bouquet of dead flowers with a card that reads "BITCH".

However, some have argued that sexism is also embedded in the writing of Ainsley's character. In dealing with the incident involving the bouquet of dead flowers, Sam Seaborn fires the two staffers in Ainsley's defense. In an essay on women characters on The West Wing, Laura K. Garrett argued this removed Ainsley's agency to deal with the problem on her own, avoided the larger question of sexist remarks towards characters on the show, and played into the narrative in which the men are needed to rescue the women from perilous situations. Another incident occurs in the third-season episode "Night Five"; after Sam comments to Ainsley that her outfit "could make a good dog break his leash", a temp worker named Celia Walton tells him in private that she thought his comments were sexist and demeaning. Sam denies this, and ultimately brings Ainsley to his defense, asking her to tell Celia that his comment was not sexist, which she does. When Celia counters that Ainsley is "letting [her] sexuality diminish her power", Ainsley replies that she sees it differently:

... I think you think I'm made out of candy glass, Celia. If somebody says something that offends you, tell them, but all women don't have to think alike... I like it when the guys tease me. It's an inadvertent show of respect—that I'm on the team and I don't mind when it gets sexual. And you know what? I like sex! ... I don't think that whatever sexuality I may have diminishes my power. I think it enhances it.

In a review of the episode, Steve Heisler criticized this scene as "vaguely defensive", speculating that it was Aaron Sorkin's response to possible hate mail about his portrayal of women, or a comment he himself might have made. Patrick Webster criticized the fact that Sorkin, as a "masculine voice", had written the scene at all; he also questioned whether a woman would really react the way Ainsley did when faced with a comment about her sexual appeal.

== Reception and legacy ==
Reception for Ainsley has ranged from mixed to positive. In a 2014 list of 144 characters on The West Wing, The Atlantic ranked Ainsley 14th, writing that she had lots of potential as a new major character before Procter left for CSI: Miami. The article refers to "And It's Surely to Their Credit" as Ainsley's "signature episode". In a 2012 list of 38 characters created by Aaron Sorkin, Margaret Lyons with Vulture ranks Ainsley as 26th; Lyons compliments her ability to foil Sam and her strength of character, but criticizes the scene in which she "tearfully stood up for her co-workers and insisted to her GOP pals that they were, sob, 'patriots'. Oy."

Steve Heisler comments in "And It's Surely to Their Credit" that he was not convinced that Ainsley's character would be a positive addition. A few weeks later, he wrote that "Bartlet's Third State of the Union" reversed his opinion on Ainsley, complimenting the character's slapstick wit and charm.

In the 2020 production of A West Wing Special to Benefit When We All Vote, Procter returned to read stage directions, despite not appearing in the episode itself. The role was intended to be split among several other actors on the show, including John Amos, Tim Matheson, and Timothy Busfield, but restrictions imposed as a result of the COVID-19 pandemic meant that Procter introduced every scene over the three-day taping.

== Works cited ==
=== Articles ===
- "15 things you didn't know about The West Wing". Empire.
- "Being Ainsley Hayes: Q&A with Emily Procter". Empire.
- Gross, Michael Joseph (May 16, 2001). "Ainsley: now more than ever". Slate.
- Rohan, Virginia (May 18, 2001). "'West Wing' conservative branches out". The Record – via Newspapers.com.
- Walter, Tom (October 24, 2002). "Procter prides herself on her N.C. roots and Memphis connections". The Commercial Appeal – via Newspapers.com.
- "Ann Coulter: The blonde assassin". The Independent. August 16, 2004.
- Heisler, Steve (June 14, 2010). "The West Wing: "The Midterms"/"In This White House"". The A.V. Club.
- Heisler, Steve (June 21, 2010). "The West Wing: "And It's Surely To Their Credit"/"The Lame Duck Congress"". The A.V. Club.
- Heisler, Steve (July 26, 2010). "The West Wing: "Bartlet's Third State Of The Union"/"The War At Home"". The A.V. Club.
- Heisler, Steve (August 8, 2010). "The West Wing: "The Two Bartlets"/"Night Five"". The A.V. Club.
- Lyons, Margaret (June 22, 2012). "From Sports Night to Studio 60: Vulture Ranks Aaron Sorkin's TV Characters". Vulture. Archived from the original on July 8, 2016.
- Abad-Santos, Alex (May 21, 2014). "Meet the man who spent a year and a half of his life explaining the best episode of the West Wing ever made". Vox.
- O'Keeffe, Joe; Reid, David; Sims, Kevin (September 12, 2014). "A definitive ranking of every character on 'The West Wing'". The Atlantic. Archived from the original on March 1, 2021.
- Vary, Adam B. (June 25, 2021). "How 'The West Wing' cast and crew pulled off their groundbreaking reunion". Variety. Archived from the original on March 25, 2022.

=== Books ===
- Crawley, Melissa (2006). Mr. Sorkin Goes to Washington: Shaping the President on Television's The West Wing. McFarland Press. ISBN 9780786424399.
- Garrett, Laura K. (2005). "Women of The West Wing: Gender Stereotypes in the Political Fiction". In Fahy, Thomas (ed.). Considering Aaron Sorkin: Essays on the Politics, Poetics and Sleight of Hand in the Films and Television Series. McFarland Press. ISBN 9780786421206.
- Parry-Giles, Shawn J. (2010). The Prime-Time Presidency: The West Wing and U.S. Nationalism. University of Illinois Press. ISBN 9780252092091.
- Paxton, Nathan A. (2005). "Virtue from Vice: Duty, Power, and The West Wing". In Fahy, Thomas (ed.). Considering Aaron Sorkin: Essays on the Politics, Poetics and Sleight of Hand in the Films and Television Series. McFarland Press. ISBN 9780786421206.
- Rowley, Keith A. (2009). "In There a Lawyer in the (White) House?: Portraying Lawyers on The West Wing". In Asimow, Michael (ed.). Lawyers in Your Living Room! Law on Television. American Bar Association. pp. 385–398. ISBN 978-1-6044232-8-0. SSRN 1345272 – via SSRN.
- Waxman, Sharon (2003). "Inside The West Wing's New World". In Rollins, Peter C. (ed.). The West Wing: The American Presidency as Television Drama. Syracuse University Press. ISBN 9780815651833.
- Webster, Patrick (2020). Windows into The West Wing. McFarland Press. ISBN 9781476639369.
