= Emily Procter =

American actress (born 1968)

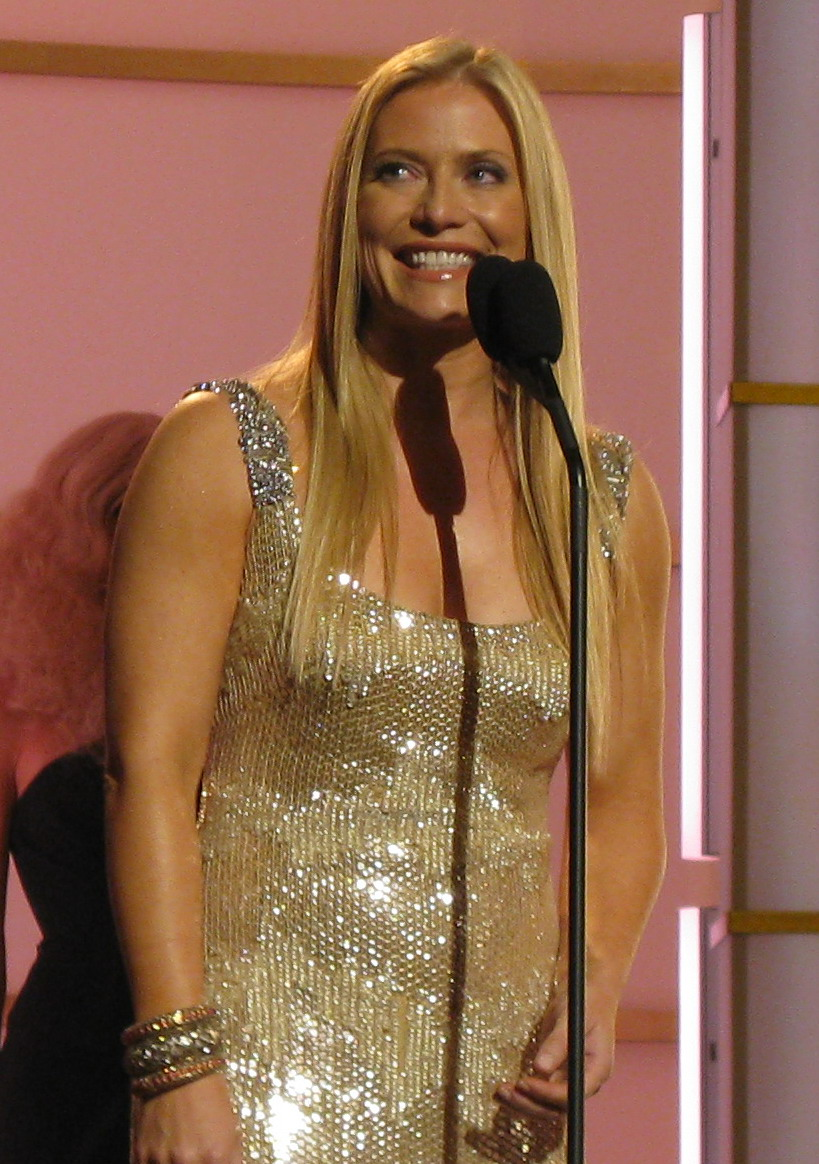
- Procter presenting at Fashion Rocks 2008
- Born: October 8, 1968 (age 57)
- Education: East Carolina University
- Occupation: Actress
- Years active: 1988–present
- Partner: Paul Bryan (2008–present)
- Children: 1
- Website: www.emilyprocter.com

Emily Procter (born October 8, 1968) is an American actress and activist. She played Ainsley Hayes in the NBC political drama The West Wing (2000–2002; 2006) and Det. Calleigh Duquesne in the CBS police procedural drama CSI: Miami (2002–2012).

== Early life ==
Procter was born on October 8, 1968. She was adopted as an infant by William Procter, a general practitioner, and Barbara Jones, a volunteer worker, and raised in Raleigh, North Carolina. She was three years old when her parents divorced. Her older brother, Whit, is also adopted.

Procter attended Ravenscroft School in Raleigh. While at East Carolina University, she joined Alpha Delta Pi sorority and was a television weather anchor at WNCT-TV in Greenville, North Carolina. She received degrees in journalism and dance.

== Career ==
After Procter moved to Los Angeles, her father paid for her to attend acting school for two years. Before graduating, she landed small film roles, including Cameron Crowe's sports romantic comedy-drama Jerry Maguire (1996), and as a co-star with David Schwimmer and Chris Cooper in the TV movie Breast Men (1997). In 1996, Procter guest-starred as Lana Lang in the ABC superhero drama Lois & Clark: The New Adventures of Superman. She briefly appeared in the TV movie The Dukes of Hazzard: Reunion! (1997) as Mavis and the drama Body Shots (1999) as Whitney Bryant.

In 1995, Procter played Annabel, a brief love interest of Joey Tribbiani (Matt LeBlanc), in the second episode of season two of the NBC sitcom Friends, titled "The One with the Breast Milk." From 2000 to 2002 and again in 2006, Procter played the recurring role of Associate White House Counsel Ainsley Hayes in the NBC political drama The West Wing.

Procter played the starring role of Calleigh Duquesne in the CSI spin-off CSI: Miami. The show ran on CBS for 10 seasons, from September 23, 2002, to April 8, 2012.

Procter participated in 2007's Live Earth event by reading aloud, along with a number of other actresses, an essay that Michelle Gardner-Quinn wrote while she was a student at the University of Vermont.

In February 2013, Procter appeared in the final two episodes of season four of the USA Network crime drama White Collar. She played Amanda Callaway, an agent from Atlanta who is promoted to head of the FBI's white collar crimes division in New York City.

== Activism ==
In 2019, Procter founded a nonprofit organization called Ground Breakers that supports change, community and equitable infrastructure. The Ground Breakers offers social and emotional language awareness to combat negative personal narratives and promote peaceful conflict resolution. The Ground teams up Defy Ventures, a nonprofit that addresses social problems such as mass incarceration and recidivism, to offer programs at Kern Valley State Prison and Nightingale school in Stockton, California.

== Personal life ==
Procter has been in a relationship with musician Paul Bryan since 2008. On December 8, 2010, she gave birth to their daughter. Because her pregnancy was not written into the ninth season of CSI: Miami, her appearances were limited.

Procter has taken part in various triathlons and marathons. She is an avid poker player and has participated in at least one celebrity poker tournament. Procter also sings in a 1980s cover band originally called White Lightning but since renamed Motion. Procter has volunteered with the Young Storytellers Program and at homeless shelters.

Procter has an interest in interior decoration and antiques that she put to practical use when decorating the 1921 Spanish-style home that she owns in Los Angeles. During the 2007–08 Writers Guild strike, she designed a home for a friend in Saint John, U.S. Virgin Islands and, according to People magazine's Country Special of March 2009, decorated Kenny Chesney's home in Malibu. She was also a guest judge on the Home & Garden Television show Summer Showdown. Procter was keynote speaker at the Spring 2019 commencement at her alma mater, East Carolina University.

Procter's home was destroyed in the 2025 Pacific Palisades wildfires.

== Filmography ==
=== Film ===
Year	Title	Role	Notes
1995	Leaving Las Vegas	Debbie	
1996	Jerry Maguire	Former Girlfriend	
1997	The Girl Gets Moe	Tammy	
1997	Family Plan	Julie Rubins	
1999	Guinevere	Susan Sloane	
1999	Forever Fabulous	Tiffany Dawl	
1999	Body Shots	Whitney Bryant	
2006	Big Momma's House 2	Leah Fuller	
2008	Turnover	Lillian Chait	Short film
2010	Barry Munday	Deborah	
2016	Love Everlasting	Helen	

=== Television ===
Year	Title	Role	Notes
1992	Great Scott!	Dream Girl	Episode: "Stripe Gripe"
1993	Gloria Vane	Peggy	Television film
1995	Renegade	Brenda	Episode: "Living Legend"
1995	Platypus Man	Mindy	Episode: "NYPD Nude"
1995	Fast Company	Roz Epstein	Television film
1995	Friends	Annabel	Episode: "The One with the Breast Milk"
1996	Lois & Clark: The New Adventures of Superman	Lana Lang	Episode: "Tempus, Anyone?"
1997	The Dukes of Hazzard: Reunion!	Mavis	Television film
1997	Early Edition	Colleen Damski	Episode: "A Regular Joe"
1997	Breast Men	Laura Pierson	Television film
1997	Just Shoot Me!	Anchorwoman	Episodes: "Back Issues", "Just Shoot Me"
2000–2002, 2006	The West Wing	Ainsley Hayes	Recurring role, 12 episodes (seasons 2–3), guest (season 7)
2001	Submerged	Frances Naquin	Television film
2002	CSI: Crime Scene Investigation	Calleigh Duquesne	Episode: "Cross-Jurisdictions"
2002–2012	CSI: Miami	Calleigh Duquesne	Main role
2013	White Collar	Amanda Callaway	Episodes: "The Original" and "In the Wind"
2020	A West Wing Special to Benefit When We All Vote	Narrator of Stage Directions	Television special
