= The West Wing season 3 =

The West Wing
- Season 3
- DVD box cover. Cast from top to bottom and left to right: Charlie, Sam, C. J., President Bartlet, Toby, Donna, Josh, Abbey and Leo
- Showrunner: Aaron Sorkin
- Starring: Rob Lowe; Stockard Channing; Dulé Hill; Allison Janney; Janel Moloney; Richard Schiff; John Spencer; Bradley Whitford; Martin Sheen
- No. of episodes: 21 + 2 specials

Release
- Original network: NBC
- Original release: October 10, 2001 – May 22, 2002

Season chronology
- ← Previous; Season 2 Next → Season 4

The third season of the American political drama television series The West Wing aired in the United States on NBC from October 10, 2001 to May 22, 2002 and consisted of 21 episodes and 2 special episodes.

== Production ==
The season premiere was delayed by the September 11, 2001 terrorist attacks in the United States. When the season did return, the first episode was a special episode titled "Isaac and Ishmael," in which the main cast paid tribute to those affected by the attacks and informed viewers about what to expect from the delayed premiere.

Series creator Aaron Sorkin acknowledged in October 2002 that the terrorism-related plots designed to keep the series relevant after the real-life attacks were awkward at times, saying "from week to week, you felt like you were writing the show handcuffed, a little bit. I didn't know how to write it anymore. It was a constant search for what I wasn't doing that used to make the show work. Maybe there was a way to make it work. There probably was. I wasn't able to find it in twenty-two episodes."

== Cast ==
The third season had star billing for nine major roles. Eight of these were filled by returning main cast members from the second season. Rob Lowe received star billing, while Martin Sheen received the final credit for his role as President Josiah Bartlet. The rest of the ensemble, now including previously recurring Stockard Channing, were credited alphabetically. Channing was only credited for the episodes in which she appears.

=== Main cast ===
- Rob Lowe as Sam Seaborn, the Deputy Communications Director
- Stockard Channing as Abbey Bartlet, the First Lady
- Dulé Hill as Charlie Young, the Personal Aide to the President
- Allison Janney as C. J. Cregg, the White House Press Secretary
- Janel Moloney as Donna Moss, the Assistant to the Deputy Chief of Staff
- Richard Schiff as Toby Ziegler, the Communications Director
- John Spencer as Leo McGarry, the White House Chief of Staff
- Bradley Whitford as Josh Lyman, the Deputy Chief of Staff
- Martin Sheen as Josiah Bartlet, the President of the United States

== Plot ==
The third season, covering the administration's third and fourth years in office, begins with Bartlet announcing his intention to run for re-election and is dominated by the subsequent campaign. Other prominent story lines include a Congressional investigation into allegations Bartlet committed electoral fraud by concealing his MS, a death threat against C.J. and the ensuing relationship she develops with the Secret Service agent assigned to protect her, and Qumari defense minister Abdul Shareef's planning of terrorist attacks against the US. The season finale resolves several of these story lines when Bartlet meets his electoral opponent and reaffirms his commitment to defeat him, finally decides to order Shareef's assassination, and, just minutes after the man who threatened her is arrested, C.J.'s Secret Service agent interrupts a convenience store robbery and is killed.

== Episodes ==
| No. overall | No. in season | Title | Directed by | Written by | Original release date | Prod. code | US viewers (millions) |
|---|---|---|---|---|---|---|---|
| 45 | 1 | "Manchester" | Thomas Schlamme | Aaron Sorkin | October 10, 2001 | 227201 | 23.65 |
| 46 | 2 | "Manchester" | Thomas Schlamme | Aaron Sorkin | October 17, 2001 | 227202 | 20.79 |
Surprising everyone, President Bartlet announces his intentions to run for re-election, angering Abbey. Meanwhile, Haiti's dictator is giving National Security Advisor Nancy McNally problems. The staff scrambles to work the news cycle in their favor in the wake of the President's announcement. C.J. makes a critical error in a statement to the press. The staffers then clash with newly hired political operative Bruno Gianelli and his aides Connie and Doug. Josh is upset because Leo will not let him "wave off the FDA" on RU-486. C.J. contemplates her future at the White House. President Bartlet makes it clear he values both Bruno's team and his senior staff and gets them focused on running a successful re-election campaign as allies rather than adversaries.
| 47 | 3 | "Ways and Means" | Alex Graves | Story by : Eli Attie & Gene Sperling; Teleplay by : Aaron Sorkin | October 24, 2001 | 227203 | 21.47 |
The special prosecutor begins his probe and the White House feels his objective, unbiased approach may hurt them politically. C.J. begins maneuvering within the press to persuade Congress to start their own investigation, believing it will be easier to win a battle with bloodthirsty Republicans. Meanwhile, Sam and Bruno are concerned about a powerful California labor leader and Toby and Josh are preoccupied with a congressional battle over the estate tax. Donna meets a young Republican lawyer.
| 48 | 4 | "On the Day Before" | Christopher Misiano | Story by : Paul Redford & Nanda Chitre; Teleplay by : Aaron Sorkin | October 31, 2001 | 227204 | 17.78 |
The President vetoes his first bill—the repeal of the estate tax—and staffers scramble to counter the GOP's override threat, first having to deal with an opportunistic Democratic congressman before Sam has an idea that leads them to a surprising ally. An international crisis erupts when Palestinian terrorists kill two Americans in Israel. Meanwhile, Charlie has been offered legal immunity and everyone urges him to take it, and a reporter mocks C.J. but is later humiliated by her in response. Note: Janel Moloney submitted this episode as an Emmy nominee for Outstanding Supporting Actress in a Drama Series.
| 49 | 5 | "War Crimes" | Alex Graves | Story by : Allison Abner; Teleplay by : Aaron Sorkin | November 7, 2001 | 227205 | 19.48 |
The President asks a reluctant Vice President (Tim Matheson) to speak at an anti-gun rally in Texas after a church shooting, while Donna goes before a Congressional committee investigating President Bartlet's lack of disclosure and lies under oath when her new boyfriend asks her a personal question. Toby deals with a leaked quote that is embarrassing to the President, while C.J. meets up with a gutsy reporter and Sam ponders a plan to eliminate the penny. Note: Janel Moloney submitted this episode as an Emmy nominee for Outstanding Supporting Actress in a Drama Series.
| 50 | 6 | "Gone Quiet" | Jon Hutman | Story by : Julia Dahl & Laura Glasser; Teleplay by : Aaron Sorkin | November 14, 2001 | 227207 | 19.89 |
An American spy submarine suddenly goes silent in hostile waters outside North Korea, and President Bartlet must decide whether he should notify the enemy or attempt a risky, secret rescue. Meanwhile, a top Republican contender cannot articulate why he wants to be President, but C.J. is disappointed with President Bartlet's own answer to that question. Toby clashes with a Congresswoman over funding the National Endowment for the Arts. Note: This episode guest stars Hal Holbrook as Deputy Secretary of State Albie Duncan, marking the first of several appearances for his character. Stockard Channing won an Emmy for Outstanding Supporting Actress in a Drama Series with this episode.
| 51 | 7 | "The Indians in the Lobby" | Paris Barclay | Story by : Allison Abner; Teleplay by : Allison Abner & Kevin Falls and Aaron Sorkin | November 21, 2001 | 227208 | 16.73 |
On the day before Thanksgiving, the President is talking turkey to whoever will listen (and everyone must). Meanwhile, C.J. deals with two Native Americans who have encamped in the lobby. Toby annoys the President when he finds out polls involving the First Family increase his popularity. Sam is dismayed by a new formula for poverty and Josh goes diplomatic on a case involving a Georgia teen who killed his teacher and fled to Italy. Note: Emmy nominated for Outstanding Directing for a Drama Series.
| 52 | 8 | "The Women of Qumar" | Alex Graves | Story by : Felicia Wilson & Laura Glasser & Julia Dahl; Teleplay by : Aaron Sorkin | November 28, 2001 | 227209 | 20.86 |
C.J. argues with senior staff over whether to make public the possibility of an outbreak of mad cow disease, as well as the renewal of a lease on a Qumari military base despite her horror with that nation's treatment of women. Toby meets with veterans upset about the content of a Smithsonian Pearl Harbor exhibition, and Josh finds some sparks when he meets with a woman's group director named Amy Gardner. Note: Allison Janney won an Emmy as Outstanding Lead Actress in a Drama Series for this episode. Also submitted for Outstanding Drama win.
| 53 | 9 | "Bartlet for America" | Thomas Schlamme | Aaron Sorkin | December 12, 2001 | 227210 | 18.42 |
It's Christmas, and the most pressing matter is a threat to firebomb black churches in Tennessee on Christmas Eve. Leo testifies before a Congressional committee on the MS matter, recalling several critical moments from the Bartlet campaign and a personal slip-up that could end his career and badly damage the President. Note: John Spencer won an Emmy for Outstanding Supporting Actor in a Drama Series for this episode. Also submitted for Outstanding Drama win.
| 54 | 10 | "H. Con-172" | Vincent Misiano | Story by : Eli Attie; Teleplay by : Aaron Sorkin | January 16, 2002 | 227211 | 18.38 |
Leo defiantly rejects the Congressional committee's offer of a public censure of President Bartlet that would end the investigation into his concealment of his illness and spare Leo any possible personal repercussions, while the President continues to weigh his options. In other stories, Josh puts his foot in his mouth over his courtship of Amy, Sam is angry over a White House tell-all book, and Charlie's heartfelt purchase of an old Middle East map for the President leads to some political problems. Note: The episode title refers to House Concurrent Resolution 172, the joint Congressional censure of President Bartlet. Bradley Whitford submitted this episode as an Emmy nominee for Outstanding Supporting Actor in a Drama series.
| 55 | 11 | "100,000 Airplanes" | David Nutter | Aaron Sorkin | February 6, 2002 | 227212 | 19.05 |
While the White House staff works intensely on the President's State of the Union speech, President Bartlet and the First Lady have dinner with a group of her scientist friends who speculate that sphingosine kinase could lead to a cure for cancer. As a result, the President demands that a passage ambitiously promising a crusade to cure cancer within ten years be included in the speech. Sam is the point man for the speech, which is billed as the most important of the President's career and one whose failure could end his hopes for re-election. As Sam is very reluctantly interviewed for a Vanity Fair profile by Lisa Sherborne, who was once his fiancée, he lays out the process by which a State of the Union address comes about. Sam knows that the pledge to cure cancer is noble and the kind of over-reaching government should do, but also that for political reasons it cannot be included in the final speech and removes it. He takes out most of his frustrations on Lisa who finally tells Sam she is taking herself off the story, reminding him that it was he and not her who ended their engagement. Attracted to Amy Gardner, a prominent women's rights leader, Josh tries to persuade her that her burgeoning romance with a Congressman is solely a result of political machinations. Note: The episode title refers to the number of United States Army Air Forces planes built during World War II, double the target announced by then-President Franklin Roosevelt.
| 56 | 12 | "The Two Bartlets" | Alex Graves | Story by : Gene Sperling; Teleplay by : Kevin Falls and Aaron Sorkin | February 13, 2002 | 227213 | 19.12 |
The staff debates whether to counter a fast-rising Republican presidential candidate's verbal assault on affirmative action at the Iowa caucuses and Josh postpones his tropical vacation with women's rights advocate Amy Gardner to defuse a risky situation in Vieques, Puerto Rico. C.J. surprises Toby with her lack of enthusiasm for affirmative action, while Sam has to meet with a UFO crackpot per Leo's orders. Toby and President Bartlet clash over the President's mental state and relationship with his father. Note: Bradley Whitford submitted this episode as an Emmy nominee for Outstanding Supporting Actor in a Drama Series. Also submitted for Outstanding Drama win.
| 57 | 13 | "Night Five" | Christopher Misiano | Aaron Sorkin | February 20, 2002 | 227214 | 18.14 |
President Bartlet consults Dr. Stanley Keyworth for a troubling sleep disorder and receives a sobering personal assessment. C.J. lobbies vigorously to help secure the release of a White House reporter who has been taken hostage while on assignment in the Democratic Republic of the Congo. Toby clashes again with his ex-wife over a speech for the United Nations that takes radical Islam to task. Sam is accused of sexism by a young intern but Ainsley comes to his defense. Note: The episode title refers to the fifth consecutive night of President Bartlet's insomnia. Martin Sheen submitted this episode as an Emmy nominee for Outstanding Lead Actor in a Drama Series. Richard Schiff submitted this episode as a nominee for Outstanding Supporting Actor. Also submitted for Outstanding Drama win.
| 58 | 14 | "Hartsfield's Landing" | Vincent Misiano | Aaron Sorkin | February 27, 2002 | 227215 | 16.36 |
President Bartlet engages both Sam and Toby in intricate chess matches that mirror the wily game of brinkmanship that Bartlet is playing with the Chinese, who are conducting war games in the Taiwan Strait. The small New England town of Hartsfield's Landing kicks off voting in the New Hampshire primary, and Josh is lobbying for every vote he can get. A prank war between C.J. and Charlie turns somewhat destructive. Note: The episode was recreated on stage for the 2020 television special A West Wing Special to Benefit When We All Vote. Richard Schiff and Dulé Hill submitted this episode as Emmy nominees for Best Supporting Actor in a Drama Series. Also submitted for Outstanding Drama win.
| 59 | 15 | "Dead Irish Writers" | Alex Graves | Story by : Paul Redford; Teleplay by : Aaron Sorkin | March 20, 2002 | 227216 | 19.49 |
As Abbey contemplates the possible loss of her medical license, she grudgingly attends a White House party for her birthday. Toby discusses the inclusion of a Sinn Féin member in the guest list of a White House event with British Ambassador Lord John Marbury (Roger Rees). Sam gets another visit from someone who wants to give him orders about what to do, this time from a respected former teacher of his who wants the US to fund a major scientific research effort. Donna's US citizenship is called into question. Note: Stockard Channing won an Emmy for Outstanding Supporting Actress in a Drama Series for this episode. Also submitted for Outstanding Drama win.
| 60 | 16 | "The U.S. Poet Laureate" | Christopher Misiano | Story by : Laura Glasser; Teleplay by : Aaron Sorkin | March 27, 2002 | 227217 | 16.95 |
President Bartlet makes a disparaging comment about a potential Republican nominee after a television interview, apparently not realizing that he is still being recorded. Meanwhile, Toby tries to dissuade the newly named US poet laureate, Tabatha Fortis (Laura Dern), from publicly objecting to the government's lack of support for a treaty on land mines. Sam offers Ainsley Hayes a big promotion and Josh discovers he has an Internet message board following that turns into a fictionalized version of Aaron Sorkin's real-life flame wars at Television Without Pity.
| 61 | 17 | "Stirred" | Jeremy Kagan | Story by : Dee Dee Myers; Teleplay by : Aaron Sorkin & Eli Attie | April 3, 2002 | 227218 | 17.26 |
When a truck carrying uranium fuel rods crashes in a remote Idaho tunnel, President Bartlet's staff prepares for a potential environmental or terrorist crisis. Donna seeks a presidential proclamation honoring the retirement of her favorite teacher. The staff considers removing Vice President John Hoynes from the ticket but for different reasons; Sam and the President are not going to let that happen. Note: The episode title refers to a comment from Bartlet about James Bond: "Shaken, not stirred will get you cold water with a dash of gin and dry vermouth. The reason you stir it with a special spoon is so not to chip the ice. James is ordering a weak martini and being snooty about it."
| 62 | 18 | "Enemies Foreign and Domestic" | Alex Graves | Paul Redford and Aaron Sorkin | May 1, 2002 | 227219 | 17.40 |
As Sam is finalizing the details of President Bartlet's upcoming summit with the Russian president, satellite photographs reveal an Iranian nuclear bomb facility being built using Russian technology. During a press briefing, C.J. voices her personal indignation that a group of schoolgirls in Saudi Arabia were prevented from escaping a burning building by religious police because they were not dressed properly according to Sharia law. After receiving death threats, C.J. is assigned Secret Service Special Agent Simon Donovan (Mark Harmon) for personal protection, and he tells her that the individual who is targeting her has no connection to jihadists. Toby tries to help a Russian journalist he thinks is being suppressed by her government, and Charlie unravels a mystery involving a long-lost letter to Franklin Roosevelt. Note: The episode title refers to a phrase from the United States Armed Forces oath of enlistment. Dulé Hill submitted this episode as an Emmy nominee for Outstanding Supporting Actor in a Drama Series.
| 63 | 19 | "The Black Vera Wang" | Christopher Misiano | Aaron Sorkin | May 8, 2002 | 227220 | 17.26 |
While C.J. gets used to being tailed by Special Agent Donovan, the President must deal with a terrorist threat on a military installation that gets closer and closer to home and leads to a frightening revelation. Meanwhile, Toby plays hardball with network TV executives who want to cut national convention coverage, and Sam's plan to keep dirty tricks out of the presidential campaign blows up in his face. Note: The episode title refers to a Vera Wang dress that C.J. purchases for herself, which her stalker mentions in one of his emails to her.
| 64 | 20 | "We Killed Yamamoto" | Thomas Schlamme | Aaron Sorkin | May 15, 2002 | 227221 | 15.54 |
President Bartlet agonizes over whether to disregard the principle of diplomatic immunity for a Middle Eastern official who is known to be plotting terrorist acts. The President is advised not to attend a fundraiser for a politically sensitive cause because his Republican opponent will also be attending. Josh and Amy clash over a welfare renewal bill, while Sam is gun-shy after the tape disclosure from earlier. Note: The episode title refers to the U.S. military assassination of Admiral Isoroku Yamamoto in 1943. Note: John Spencer won an Emmy for Outstanding Supporting Actor in a Drama Series for this episode. Also submitted for Outstanding Drama win.
| 65 | 21 | "Posse Comitatus" | Alex Graves | Aaron Sorkin | May 22, 2002 | 227222 | 16.64 |
President Bartlet makes a life-or-death decision regarding the defense minister of Qumar who is a known terrorist. The flirtation between C.J. and her Secret Service bodyguard, Simon Donovan, is limited by their professional relationship and then cut short by tragedy. Josh defeats Amy in the welfare bill battle and their relationship is left with an uncertain future. President Bartlet encounters his opponent, Governor Ritchie, at a performance of The Wars of the Roses. (Note: The real play has no music; the song performed in the episode is "England Arise!" from Nicholas Nickleby.) Note: The episode title refers to the Posse Comitatus Act, which limits the power of the US government to use the military to enforce laws within the United States. Emmy nominated for Outstanding Writing and Directing for a Drama Series. Also submitted for Outstanding Drama win.

Note: On the original U.S. Season 3 DVD release (at least), the episode numbers for Season 3 start with "Isaac and Ishmael" as episode 1, and all subsequent episodes numbers are increased by 1 in comparison to this chart.

== Specials ==
Two special episodes, not part of the official continuity, were produced to complement the series and were broadcast on NBC. Both episodes ran within the third season and were included on the season's DVDs.

=== "Isaac and Ishmael" ===
Written by series creator Aaron Sorkin and directed by Christopher Misiano, this episode was a terrorism-themed episode produced in the wake of the September 11 attacks. The episode pushed the scheduled season premiere back a week and encouraged viewers to donate to charity—profits from the episode and cast members' weekly pay were also donated. The episode "was written and produced in record time"—less than three weeks—and aired on October 3, 2001.

=== "Documentary Special" ===
The second special interspersed the characters' fictional lives with interviews of real West Wing personnel, including Presidents Ford, Carter, and Clinton; press secretaries Marlin Fitzwater and Dee Dee Myers; presidential advisors David Gergen, Paul Begala, and incumbent Karl Rove; Secretary of State Henry Kissinger; Chief of Staff Leon Panetta; presidential personal secretary Betty Currie; and speechwriter Peggy Noonan. The documentary won a Primetime Emmy Award in 2002 for "Outstanding Special Class Program". It aired April 24, 2002.

== Reception ==
=== Critical response ===
On Rotten Tomatoes, the season has an approval rating of 73% with an average score of 10 out of 10 based on 15 reviews. The website's critical consensus reads, "The West Wing still fires off enthralling repartee as if the series' wit was mandated by executive order, but this underwhelming third season finds the series' idealism curdling into a smug self-satisfaction that can't seem to stop wondering why real politics can't be as simple as they are in the fantasy world Aaron Sorkin has crafted."

=== Accolades ===
The third season received 21 Emmy Award nominations for the 54th Primetime Emmy Awards, the most-nominated season, winning a total of 4 awards. The series won its third consecutive award for Outstanding Drama Series and Allison Janney also won her third consecutive award, this time in the Outstanding Lead Actress in a Drama Series category. John Spencer and Stockard Channing each won for Outstanding Supporting Actor in a Drama Series and Outstanding Supporting Actress in a Drama Series, respectively, after being nominated twice before. The season received several acting nominations, which included Martin Sheen for Outstanding Lead Actor in a Drama Series; Dulé Hill, Richard Schiff, and Bradley Whitford for Outstanding Supporting Actor in a Drama Series; Janel Moloney and Mary-Louise Parker for Outstanding Supporting Actress in a Drama Series; Mark Harmon, Tim Matheson, and Ron Silver for Outstanding Guest Actor in a Drama Series. Paris Barclay (for "The Indians in the Lobby") and Alex Graves (for "Posse Comitatus") were each nominated for Outstanding Directing for a Drama Series, and Aaron Sorkin was nominated for Outstanding Writing for a Drama Series (for "Posse Comitatus").

Thomas Del Ruth won an award from the American Society of Cinematographers for the episode "Bartlet for America".
