= A West Wing Special to Benefit When We All Vote =

- The West Wing episode
- Directed by: Thomas Schlamme
- Written by: Aaron Sorkin; Eli Attie (special material)
- Original air date: October 15, 2020
- Running time: 64 minutes

Guest appearances
- Elisabeth Moss; Samuel L. Jackson; Michelle Obama; Marlee Matlin; Lin-Manuel Miranda; Bill Clinton; Emily Procter

Episode chronology
- The West Wing season 3

"A West Wing Special to Benefit When We All Vote" is a special reunion episode of the television series The West Wing. The episode was a recreation of the season 3 episode "Hartsfield's Landing", shot at the Orpheum Theatre in Los Angeles, California. It was released on October 15, 2020, on HBO Max.

== Production ==
In August 2020, it was announced that cast members Martin Sheen, Rob Lowe, Dulé Hill, Allison Janney, Richard Schiff, Bradley Whitford and Janel Moloney would reprise their roles for a stage version of the 2002 episode "Hartsfield's Landing". The episode was intended to raise awareness and support for When We All Vote, a nonprofit organization founded by Michelle Obama, Lin-Manuel Miranda and others to increase participation in United States elections.

A West Wing Special to Benefit When We All Vote includes special material written by Aaron Sorkin and Eli Attie and was directed by Thomas Schlamme. Music was performed by The West Wing composer W. G. Snuffy Walden and The Avett Brothers. Schlamme had previously directed a live episode of ER in 1997 and watched episodes of other live television shows, such as Playhouse 90, for ideas of how to approach the special.

Production began in early October 2020 at Los Angeles' Orpheum Theatre and the episode was released on October 15 on HBO Max. On October 27, 2020, HBO Max made the special viewable for free to non-subscribers until the end of 2020.

The role of Leo McGarry was performed by Sterling K. Brown; John Spencer, who had originally played the role, died in 2005. Emily Procter, who played Ainsley Hayes in the series, read the stage directions.

=== Act breaks ===
The act breaks within the show featured several guest appearances to encourage voter turnout in the 2020 United States elections. Co-founder of When We All Vote and former First Lady of the United States Michelle Obama appeared in the first act break, rallying general voter turnout and asking for voters to tell their friends and family to vote. The tone of the act breaks were then set by Rob Lowe and Allison Janney, who said the priorities were to "clear up some confusion, provide some information, and who knows, possibly some inspiration."

Dulé Hill and Elisabeth Moss encouraged people between the ages of 18 and 24 (a demographic that has a low voter turnout) to vote, arguing that their future and prosperity depended on the outcome of the election. Moss played Zoey Bartlet on the show but the character did not make an appearance in the episode.

Samuel L. Jackson also appeared, emphasizing that Americans should be better than some of the rhetoric being used at the time, such as antiscience attitudes during the COVID-19 pandemic and prejudice towards African Americans. While he conceded that The West Wing is an "unattainable TV fantasy", Jackson questioned why this had to be the case and added that American politics should still be above hate. Jackson argued at the end that voting in the 2020 elections was a way to show opposition to this hate.

Bradley Whitford talked about the logistics of voting with Marlee Matlin, who played Joey Lucas on the show (her character did not make an appearance in the episode). To "clarify misconceptions about voting", they expressed that while the process may seem confusing, or open to fraud, voting should be easy and that there are ways to get questions about voting answered.

Co-founder of When We All Vote Lin-Manuel Miranda, after a sketch with Janel Moloney contrasting The West Wing with Hamilton: An American Musical (which was written by Miranda), assured the audience that though the process of counting votes may take time due to the high number of absentee ballots in the election, the process was fair and open and that it did not mean electoral fraud was taking place.

Former president Bill Clinton reminded the public of the steps taken by various administrations (including his) to protect voting rights in the United States, but argued that the Shelby County v. Holder decision of 2013, which partially struck down the Voting Rights Act of 1965, let states and counties suppress voter turnout, particularly through mail-in ballots. He used this to encourage the public to vote regardless, reasoning: "If your vote really doesn't matter, why are people so very hard working so hard to make sure you don't cast it? Because it does matter – there's real power in your vote. The power to make our union more perfect."

Dulé Hill and Sterling K. Brown, both African American actors, argued that African Americans in particular need to increase their voter turnout, musing that "even at the height of Black Lives Matter, too many young black men think elections don't matter." They said that even though there were numerous institutions acting to keep black people from voting, they told the viewers "Don't listen to those who are dying for you to sit on your hands."

== Reaction ==
Reception of the episode was generally positive. Brian Lowry, writing for CNN, characterized the special as to "approximate the experience of watching a stage play, only with a best-seat-in-the-house view," including "shooting the performers from behind and revealing the rows and rows of empty seats," what Lowry considered "a poignant reminder of what's been lost on the theatrical front since the pandemic began."

Patrick Gomez of The A.V. Club wrote that "the special always stays on the right side of being a Very Special Episode" and gave it a grade of "A−".

Ben Travers from IndieWire considers the episode "a reimagining of a strong television episode", and said that "the new version of "Hartsfield's Landing" plays out beautifully."

Daniel Fienberg of The Hollywood Reporter's summary read "[a] solid recreation of a solid episode for a solid cause".

Award nominations for "A West Wing Special to Benefit When We All Vote"
Year	Award	Category	Nominee(s)	Result
2021	Hollywood Critics Association TV Awards	Best Streaming Sketch Series, Variety Series, Talk Show or Comedy/Variety Special	A West Wing Special to Benefit When We All Vote	Nominated
2021	Primetime Emmy Awards	Outstanding Variety Special (Pre-Recorded)	Casey Patterson, Thomas Schlamme, Aaron Sorkin, Rob Paine and Brittany Mehmedovic	Nominated
2021	Primetime Creative Arts Emmy Awards	Outstanding Directing for a Variety Special	Thomas Schlamme	Nominated
