= Hartsfield's Landing =

- The West Wing episode
- Episode no.: Season 3 Episode 15
- Directed by: Vincent Misiano
- Written by: Aaron Sorkin
- Production code: 227215
- Original air date: February 27, 2002

Episode chronology
← Previous "Night Five"	Next → "Dead Irish Writers"
- The West Wing season 3

"Hartsfield's Landing" is the fourteenth episode of the third season of The West Wing, an American serial political drama. The episode aired on February 27, 2002, on NBC. The episode takes its title from the fictional bellwether town that is central to the episode, which is holding an election that Josh Lyman wants to win for the president. "Hartsfield's Landing" also includes Toby Ziegler and Sam Seaborn playing chess matches against President Jed Bartlet, and C. J. Cregg involving herself in a prank war against Charlie Young. Allison Janney, who portrayed C. J., described the episode as one of her favorites. In 2020, the episode was reprised by the original cast in A West Wing Special to Benefit When We All Vote.

== Plot ==
The episode takes its name from the fictional town of Hartsfield's Landing, New Hampshire, which has an eligible voting population of 42. It is election day for the small town, and Josh is focused on winning the town for President Bartlet because the town's population finishes voting within ten minutes of midnight, feeding their results into the news cycle for 21 hours until the rest of New Hampshire finishes voting. While the election is only preliminary, the town has a reputation for predicting the next president in every election since William Howard Taft. Josh, therefore, makes Donna canvass for the votes of her connections in the town. Donna spends the next few hours standing outside the White House, in the cold night, trying to remind the voters of the president's accomplishments. Josh eventually calls off the effort, recognizing that the voters are their own individuals and that he cannot control the outcome.

Meanwhile, the president has returned from India with new chess sets, gifting them to Sam and Toby and challenging both to a match. Toby's match, set in the Oval Office, is a follow-up to the conversation the two had in a prior episode, where Toby criticizes the president for hiding his intellect in favor of folksiness and linked it to his father, who always despised his intellect. The president, though still angry at Toby, explores the two sides of the argument with him; at one point, after Toby calls the president's father an "idiot", he puts Toby in check and angrily storms out of the room. Toby, however, has the final word on the president's situation, telling him that he far outclasses his opponent intellectually and should not play his game of plainspoken folksiness.

Sam's match is set in his own office. Rather than re-election, the two discuss a dispute unfolding between China and Taiwan, and the president's diplomatic maneuvering to prevent the conflict from escalation. This conversation serves as an opportunity for the president to act as a mentor, leisurely telling Sam to "see the whole board" as he wins the match anyway and assuring Sam that he will run for president one day. For humor, the episode includes a subplot of C. J. and Charlie pranking each other following Charlie's refusal to unconditionally give C. J. the president's private schedule.

== Cast ==
- Martin Sheen as Josiah Bartlet, the President of the United States
- John Spencer as Leo McGarry, the White House Chief of Staff
- Bradley Whitford as Josh Lyman, the Deputy White House Chief of Staff
- Janel Moloney as Donna Moss, the assistant to Josh Lyman
- Dulé Hill as Charlie Young, the Personal Aide to the President
- Richard Schiff as Toby Ziegler, the White House Communications Director
- Allison Janney as C. J. Cregg, the White House Press Secretary
- Rob Lowe as Sam Seaborn, the Deputy White House Communications Director

== Analysis and legacy ==
In 2014, Allison Janney told The Hollywood Reporter that "Hartsfield's Landing" was one of her favorite episodes, along with the sixth season's "Liftoff" and the third season's "The Women of Qumar". Rob Lowe, drawing on the scene in which the president tells Sam that he will be president someday, commented that Sam should be the president of a West Wing reboot.

=== Real-life towns ===
Hartsfield's Landing, while fictional, has been described as a homage to real-life, small, early-voting New Hampshire towns such as Hart's Location, Dixville Notch, and Millsfield. These towns are able to vote early, like Hartsfield's Landing, due to a New Hampshire law that allows any town with fewer than 100 residents to begin voting at midnight and close the polls when all registered voters have cast their ballots. Analyses conclude that unlike Hartsfield's Landing, Dixville Notch is not a bellwether; it does not reliably predict the winner in the general election for either New Hampshire or the country. The town did, however, correctly predict the Republican nominee for the presidency in every election between 1968 and 2012.

=== Reprise ===
In 2020, "Hartsfield's Landing" was reprised in A West Wing Special to Benefit When We All Vote. The entire main cast, with the exception of the deceased John Spencer, (Note: The role of Leo McGarry was filled by Sterling K. Brown.) returned to their roles for a recorded stage play of the episode in the Orpheum Theatre in Los Angeles. Daniel Fienberg with The Hollywood Reporter termed the reunion "[a] solid recreation of a solid episode for a solid cause".
