= Lily Tomlin filmography =

Filmography of American actress Lily Tomlin

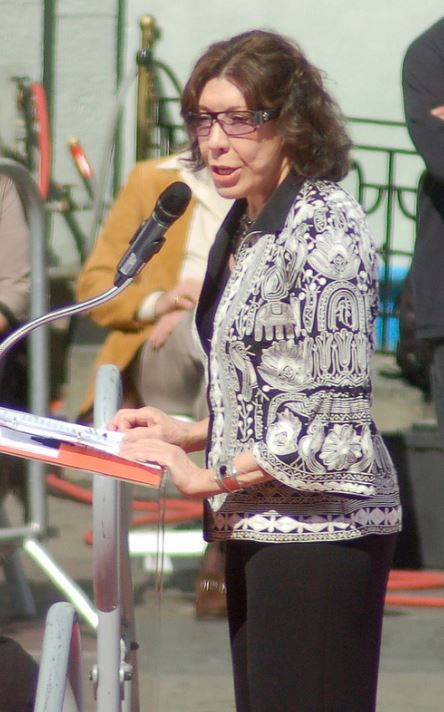
Lily Tomlin in 2013

This list is an article of Lily Tomlin's filmography

Lily Tomlin is an American actress and entertainer who has had various performances on stage and screen throughout a career spanning almost seven decades since 1965; various of which earned her numerous accolades and honors.

She started her career acting on variety sketch programs such as The Garry Moore Show (1966–1967), Rowan & Martin's Laugh-In (1969–1973), The Carol Burnett Show (1973) and Saturday Night Live (1976–1977). She voiced Ms. Valerie "Val" Frizzle in The Magic School Bus (1994–1997) and The Magic School Bus Rides Again (2017–2018). She starred in and executive produced the Netflix comedy series Grace and Frankie from 2015 to 2022. During her career she also took recurring roles in Murphy Brown (1996–1998), The West Wing (2002–2006) and Desperate Housewives (2008–2009).

Tomlin made her film debut in the Robert Altman film Nashville (1975). She then starred in the successful comedy films The Late Show (1977), 9 to 5 (1980), and All of Me (1984). She took supporting roles in Shadows and Fog (1991), Short Cuts (1993), Flirting with Disaster (1996), Tea with Mussolini (1999), I Heart Huckabees (2004), and A Prairie Home Companion (2006). She recently starred in Grandma (2015), Moving On (2022), and 80 for Brady (2023).

She made her Broadway debut acting, writing and directing the play Appearing Nitely (1977). She played various roles in her one woman show The Search for Signs of Intelligent Life in the Universe in 1985 and again in 2000 both on Broadway.

== Filmography ==
=== Film ===
Year	Title	Role	Notes	Ref.
1972	Scarecrow in a Garden of Cucumbers	Telephone Voice	Uncredited	
1975	Nashville	Linnea Reese		
1977	The Late Show	Margo Sperling		
1978	Moment by Moment	Trisha Rawlings		
1980	9 to 5	Violet Newstead		
1981	The Incredible Shrinking Woman	Pat Kramer / Judith Beasley		
1984	All of Me	Edwina Cutwater		
1988	Big Business	Rose Shelton / Rose Ratliff		
1991	The Search for Signs of Intelligent Life in the Universe	Trudy, et al.		
1992	Shadows and Fog	Jenny (Prostitute)		
1992	The Player	Herself		
1993	The Beverly Hillbillies	Miss Jane Hathaway		
1993	Short Cuts	Doreen Piggot		
1995	Blue in the Face	Waffle Eater		
1995	The Celluloid Closet	Narrator	Voice	
1996	Getting Away with Murder	Inga Mueller		
1996	Flirting with Disaster	Mary Schlichting		
1998	Krippendorf's Tribe	Professor Ruth Allen		
1999	Get Bruce	Herself	Documentary	
1999	Tea with Mussolini	Georgie Rockwell		
2000	The Kid	Janet		
2002	Orange County	Charlotte Cobb		
2004	I Heart Huckabees	Vivian Jaffe		
2006	A Prairie Home Companion	Rhonda Johnson		
2006	The Ant Bully	Mommo	Voice	
2007	The Walker	Abigail DeLorean		
2009	The Pink Panther 2	Mrs. Yvette Berenger		
2009	Ponyo	Toki	Voice, English dub	
2012	Stars in Shorts	Mum	Segment: "The Procession"	
2013	Admission	Susannah		
2015	Grandma	Elle Reid		
2018	Jane Fonda in Five Acts	Herself	Documentary	
2018	Spider-Man: Into the Spider-Verse	May Parker	Voice	
2022	Moving On	Evelyn		
2023	80 for Brady	Lou		
2025	Janis Ian: Breaking Silence	Herself	Documentary	

=== Television ===
Year	Title	Role	Notes	Ref.
1966–67	The Garry Moore Show	Regular	Unknown episodes	
1969	Letters to Laugh-In	Panelist		
1969	The Music Scene	Hostess, Various characters		
1969–73	Rowan & Martin's Laugh-In	Various characters	Episode: "Guest Starring Peter Lawford Again"	
1973	Lily	Herself	Television special	
1973	The Carol Burnett Show	Herself	Episode: "Steve Lawrence and Lily Tomlin"	
1973	The Electric Company	Ernestine	Episode: "Ernestine the Operator"	
1974	Woman Alive!	Herself	Television special	
1975	The Lily Tomlin Special	Herself	Television special	
1976–77	Saturday Night Live	Host / Ernestine / Various	4 episodes	
1977	The Paul Simon Special	Herself	Television special	
1977	Lily Tomlin in Appearing Nitely	Herself	Television special	
1979–83	Sesame Street	Edith Ann	3 episodes	
1981	Lily: Sold Out	Herself	Television special	
1982	Lily for President?	Herself	Television special	
1984	Pryor's Place	Herself	Episode: "Cousin Rita"	
1993	And the Band Played On	Dr. Selma Dritz	HBO television film	
1994	Frasier	Rita	Voice, episode: "The Unkindest Cut of All"	
1994–97	The Magic School Bus	Ms. Valerie "Val" Frizzle / The Frizz	Voice, main role	
1996	Homicide: Life on the Street	Rose Halligan	Episode: The Hat	
1996–98	Murphy Brown	Kay Carter-Shepley	46 episodes	
1998	The X-Files	Lyda	Episode: "How the Ghosts Stole Christmas"	
2000	Bette	Herself	Episode: "Silent But Deadly"	
2002–06	The West Wing	Deborah Fiderer	35 episodes	
2005	The Simpsons	Tammy	Voice, episode: "The Last of the Red Hat Mamas"	
2005–06	Will & Grace	Margot	Episodes: "Partners" and "Forbidden Fruit"	
2008	12 Miles of Bad Road	Amelia Shakespeare	6 episodes	
2008–09	Desperate Housewives	Roberta Simonds	6 episodes	
2009	Kathy Griffin: My Life on the D-List	Herself	Episode: "I Heart Lily Tomlin"	
2010	Damages	Marilyn Tobin	10 episodes	
2011	NCIS	Penelope Langston	Episode: "The Penelope Papers"	
2011–15	Web Therapy	Putsy Hodge	15 episodes	
2012	Eastbound & Down	Tammy Powers	3 episodes	
2012–13	Malibu Country	Lillie Mae	18 episodes	
2015–22	Grace and Frankie	Frankie Bergstein	Main role; 94 episodes; also executive producer	
2017–18	The Magic School Bus Rides Again	Professor Frizzle	Voice; 26 episodes	
2020	The Ellen DeGeneres Show	Herself (guest host)	Episode: "January 17, 2020"	
2023	Carol Burnett: 90 Years of Laughter + Love	Herself	NBC Television special	

=== Theatre ===
Year	Title	Role	Playwright	Venue	Ref.
1977	Appearing Nitely	Performer	Also writer / Director	Biltmore Theatre, Broadway	
1985	The Search for Signs of Intelligent Life in the Universe	Performer / Various	Jane Wagner	Plymouth Theatre, Broadway	
2000	The Search for Signs of Intelligent Life in the Universe	Performer / Various	Jane Wagner	Booth Theatre, Broadway	

== Discography ==
=== Albums ===
Year	Album	Billboard 200	Label
1971	This Is A Recording	15	Polydor Records
1972	And That's the Truth	41	Polydor Records
1975	Modern Scream	—	Polydor Records
1978	On Stage	120	Arista Records
2003	20th Century Masters: The Best of Lily Tomlin	—	Polydor Records

== See also ==
- List of awards and nominations received by Lily Tomlin
