= List of awards and nominations received by Lily Tomlin =

Lily Tomlin awards and nominations
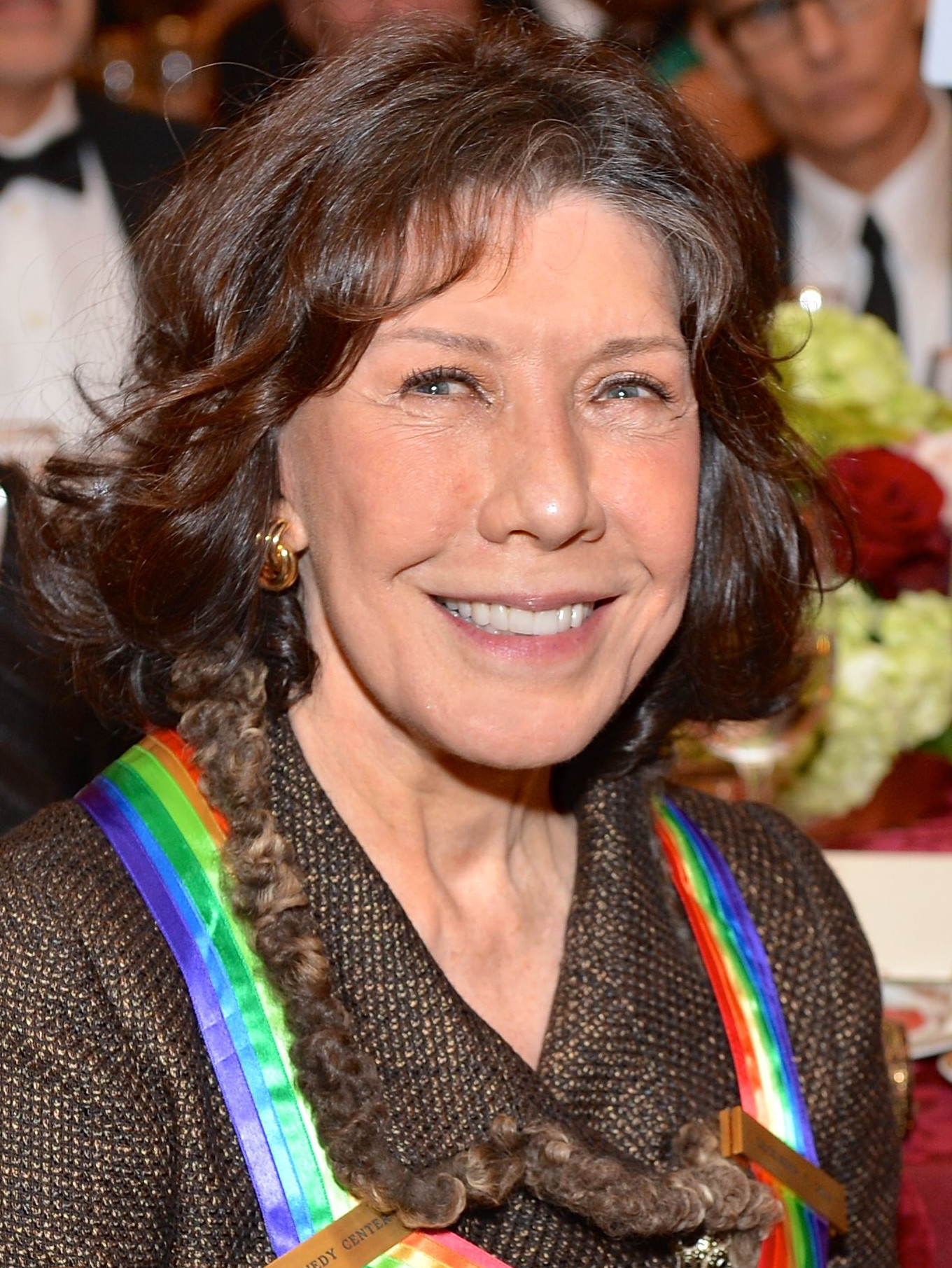
- Tomlin at the 2014 Kennedy Center Honors
Awards and nominations
Award	Wins	Nominations
Academy Awards	0	1
Actor Awards	0	6
Daytime Emmy Awards	1	5
Golden Globes	0	7
Grammy Awards	1	5
Primetime Emmy Awards	6	25
Tony Awards	2	2

Totals (Note: Certain award groups do not simply award one winner. They acknowledge several different recipients, have runners-up, and have third place. Since this is a specific recognition and is different from losing an award, runner-up mentions are considered wins in this award tally. For simplification and to avoid errors, each award in this list has been presumed to have had a prior nomination.)
- Wins: 46
- Nominations: 109

Lily Tomlin is an American actress, comedian, writer, singer, and producer who has received numerous accolades throughout her career, including a Daytime Emmy Award, a Grammy Award, six Primetime Emmy Awards, two Tony Awards, and nominations for an Academy Award, two British Academy Film Awards and seven Golden Globes. She is one of the few performers to have been nominated for the four major American entertainment awards (EGOT).

Tomlin's breakout role was on the variety show Rowan & Martin's Laugh-In from 1969 until 1973, which earned her one Golden Globe Award and three Primetime Emmy Award nominations. She received four nominations for the Grammy Award for Best Comedy Recording, winning once for the 1971 comedy album This Is a Recording. She won her first two Emmy Awards for the 1973 CBS special Lily, in the categories of Outstanding Comedy-Variety, Variety or Music Special and Outstanding Writing in a Comedy-Variety, Variety or Music Special.

In 1975, Robert Altman cast Tomlin in the satirical musical film Nashville, who at the time had no prior film experience, having worked exclusively in television. Her performance earned her nominations for the Academy Award for Best Supporting Actress, the BAFTA Award for Most Promising Newcomer to Leading Film Roles, two Golden Globe Awards including Best Supporting Actress and New Star of the Year, and wins at the National Society of Film Critics and New York Film Critics Circle awards. She had her subsequent film role in The Late Show (1977), which was a critical success, with Tomlin winning the Silver Bear for Best Actress at the Berlin International Film Festival and being nominated for the BAFTA Award for Best Actress in a Leading Role and the Golden Globe Award for Best Actress in a Motion Picture – Musical or Comedy. In 1985, Tomlin starred in the one-woman Broadway show The Search for Signs of Intelligent Life in the Universe, written by her long-time life partner, writer/producer Jane Wagner. The production won her the Tony Award for Best Actress in a Play, two Drama Desk Awards, a New York Drama Critics' Circle Award and an Outer Critics Circle Award. She then won the 1995 Daytime Emmy Award for Outstanding Performer in an Animated Program for her voice acting in the animated series The Magic School Bus (1994–97) and had a recurring role in the political drama series The West Wing (1999–2006), that earned her three nominations at the Actor Awards. In 2015, she starred opposite to Jane Fonda in the successful comedy series Grace and Frankie (2015–2022), for which she received four consecutive nominations for the Primetime Emmy Award for Outstanding Lead Actress in a Comedy Series.

For her lifetime achievements, Tomlin was honored with the Mark Twain Prize for American Humor, the Screen Actors Guild Life Achievement Award, the TCA Career Achievement Award and a medallion at the Kennedy Center Honors.

== Major associations ==
=== Academy Awards ===
Year	Category	Nominated work	Result	Ref.
1976	Best Supporting Actress	Nashville	Nominated	

=== Actor Awards ===
Year	Category	Nominated work	Result	Ref.
2003	Outstanding Actress in a Drama Series	The West Wing	Nominated	
2003	Outstanding Ensemble in a Drama Series	The West Wing	Nominated	
2002	Outstanding Ensemble in a Drama Series	The West Wing	Nominated	
2017	Outstanding Actress in a Comedy Series	Grace and Frankie	Nominated	
2017	Life Achievement Award	Honoree	Won	
2018	Outstanding Actress in a Comedy Series	Grace and Frankie	Nominated	
2019	Outstanding Actress in a Comedy Series	Grace and Frankie	Nominated	

=== BAFTA Awards ===
Year	Category	Nominated work	Result	Ref.
1976	Most Promising Newcomer to Leading Film Roles	Nashville	Nominated	
1978	Best Actress in a Leading Role	The Late Show	Nominated	

=== Emmy Awards ===
Year	Category	Nominated work	Result	Ref.
Daytime Emmy Awards
1985	Outstanding Performer in a Children's Program	Pryor's Place	Nominated	
1995	Outstanding Performer in an Animated Program	The Magic School Bus	Won	
1996	Outstanding Performer in an Animated Program	The Magic School Bus	Nominated	
1997	Outstanding Performer in an Animated Program	The Magic School Bus	Nominated	
1998	Outstanding Performer in an Animated Program	The Magic School Bus	Nominated	
Primetime Emmy Awards
1971	Outstanding Individual Achievement in a Variety Program	Rowan & Martin's Laugh-In	Nominated	
1972	Outstanding Achievement by a Performer in Music or Variety	Rowan & Martin's Laugh-In	Nominated	
1973	Outstanding Achievement by a Performer in Music or Variety	Rowan & Martin's Laugh-In	Nominated	
1973	Outstanding Writing Achievement in Comedy, Variety or Music	The Lily Tomlin Show	Nominated	
1974	Outstanding Comedy-Variety, Variety or Music Special	Lily (1973 special)	Won	
1974	Best Writing in Comedy-Variety, Variety or Music Special	Lily (1973 special)	Won	
1975	Outstanding Special – Comedy-Variety or Music	Lily (1974 special)	Nominated	
1975	Outstanding Writing in a Comedy-Variety or Music Special	Lily (1974 special)	Nominated	
1976	Outstanding Special – Comedy-Variety or Music	Lily Tomlin	Nominated	
1976	Outstanding Writing in a Comedy-Variety or Music Special	Lily Tomlin	Won	
1978	Outstanding Writing in a Comedy-Variety or Music Special	The Paul Simon Special	Won	
1981	Outstanding Variety, Music or Comedy Program	Lily: Sold Out	Won	
1984	Outstanding Individual Performance in a Variety or Music Program	Live... And in Person	Nominated	
1993	Outstanding Variety, Music or Comedy Special	The Search for Signs of Intelligent Life in the Universe	Nominated	
1993	Outstanding Individual Performance in a Variety or Music Program	The Search for Signs of Intelligent Life in the Universe	Nominated	
1994	Outstanding Supporting Actress in a Miniseries or Special	And the Band Played On	Nominated	
1994	Outstanding Individual Performance in a Variety or Music Program	Growing Up Funny	Nominated	
1996	Outstanding Guest Actress in a Drama Series	Homicide: Life on the Street	Nominated	
1996	Outstanding Informational Special	The Celluloid Closet	Nominated	
2010	Outstanding Guest Actress in a Drama Series	Damages	Nominated	
2013	Outstanding Voice-Over Performance	An Apology to Elephants	Won	
2015	Outstanding Lead Actress in a Comedy Series	Grace and Frankie	Nominated	
2016	Outstanding Lead Actress in a Comedy Series	Grace and Frankie	Nominated	
2017	Outstanding Lead Actress in a Comedy Series	Grace and Frankie	Nominated	
2018	Outstanding Lead Actress in a Comedy Series	Grace and Frankie	Nominated	

=== Golden Globe Awards ===
Year	Category	Nominated work	Result	Ref.
1972	Best Supporting Actress – Series, Miniseries or Television Film	Rowan & Martin's Laugh-In	Nominated	
1976	Best Supporting Actress – Motion Picture	Nashville	Nominated	
1976	New Star of the Year – Actress	Nashville	Nominated	
1978	Best Actress in a Motion Picture – Musical or Comedy	The Late Show	Nominated	
1985	Best Actress in a Motion Picture – Musical or Comedy	All of Me	Nominated	
1994	Special Achievement Award for Ensemble Cast (non-competitive)	Short Cuts	Recipient	
2016	Best Actress in a Motion Picture – Musical or Comedy	Grandma	Nominated	
2016	Best Actress in a Television Series – Musical or Comedy	Grace and Frankie	Nominated	

=== Grammy Awards ===
Year	Category	Nominated work	Result	Ref.
1972	Best Comedy Recording	This Is a Recording	Won	
1973	Best Comedy Recording	And That's the Truth	Nominated	
1976	Best Comedy Recording	Modern Scream	Nominated	
1979	Best Comedy Recording	On Stage	Nominated	
2005	Best Spoken Word Album	The World According to Mr. Rogers	Nominated	

=== Tony Awards ===
Year	Category	Nominated work	Result	Ref.
1977	Special Tony Award		Won	
1986	Best Actress in a Play	The Search for Signs of Intelligent Life in the Universe	Won	

== Honours ==
=== Kennedy Center Honors ===
Year	Category	Nominated work	Result	Ref.
2014	Kennedy Center Honors	Honoree	Won	

=== Peabody Awards ===
Year	Category	Nominated work	Result	Ref.
1996	Area of Excellence	The Celluloid Closet	Won	
1996	Area of Excellence	Edith Ann's Christmas - Just Say Noël	Won	
2023	Career Achievement Award	Honoree	Won	

=== Mark Twain Prize for American Humor ===
Year	Category	Nominated work	Result	Ref.
2003	Mark Twain Prize	Honoree	Won	

== Miscellaneous awards ==
Awards and nominations received by Lily Tomlin
Award	Year (Note: Indicates the year of ceremony.)	Nominated work	Category	Result	Ref.
Alliance of Women Film Journalists Awards	2016	—N/a	Actress Defying Age and Ageism	Won (Note: Tied with Charlotte Rampling)	
AARP Movies for Grownups Awards	2005	I Heart Huckabees	Best Actress	Nominated	
AARP Movies for Grownups Awards	2016	Grandma	Best Actress	Won	
AARP Movies for Grownups Awards	2022	Grace and Frankie	Best Actress (TV/Streaming)	Nominated	
AARP Movies for Grownups Awards	2022	—N/a	Career Achievement Award	Won	
American Comedy Awards	1987	—N/a	Funniest Female Stand-Up Comic	Won	
American Comedy Awards	1987	—N/a	Lifetime Achievement Award	Won	
American Comedy Awards	1988	—N/a	Funniest Female Stand-Up Comic	Won	
American Comedy Awards	1989	Big Business	Funniest Leading Actress in a Motion Picture	Nominated	
American Comedy Awards	1989	—N/a	Funniest Female Stand-Up Comic	Nominated	
American Comedy Awards	1991	An Evening with... Friends of the Environment	Funniest Female Performer in a TV Special	Won	
American Comedy Awards	1992	The Search for Signs of Intelligent Life in the Universe	Funniest Leading Actress in a Motion Picture	Won	
American Comedy Awards	1994	The Beverly Hillbillies	Funniest Leading Actress in a Motion Picture	Nominated	
American Comedy Awards	1994	Short Cuts	Funniest Supporting Actress in a Motion Picture	Won	
American Comedy Awards	1996	Blue in the Face	Funniest Supporting Actress in a Motion Picture	Nominated	
American Comedy Awards	1997	Flirting with Disaster	Funniest Supporting Actress in a Motion Picture	Nominated	
American Comedy Awards	1997	The 10th Annual American Comedy Awards	Funniest Female Performer in a TV Special	Nominated	
Berlin International Film Festival Awards	1977	The Late Show	Silver Bear for Best Actress	Won	
Critics' Choice Awards	2007	A Prairie Home Companion	Best Acting Ensemble	Nominated	
Critics' Choice Awards	2016	Grandma	Best Actress in a Comedy	Nominated	
Dorian Awards	2014	—N/a	Timeless Star Award	Won	
Dorian Awards	2016	Grace and Frankie	TV Performance of the Year – Actress	Nominated	
Drama Desk Awards	1986	The Search for Signs of Intelligent Life in the Universe	Outstanding Actress in a Play	Won	
Drama Desk Awards	1986	The Search for Signs of Intelligent Life in the Universe	Unique Theatrical Experience	Won	
Dublin Film Critics' Circle Awards	2015	Grandma	Best Actress	Nominated	
Film Independent Spirit Awards	1992	The Search for Signs of Intelligent Life in the Universe	Best Female Lead	Nominated	
Film Independent Spirit Awards	1997	Flirting with Disaster	Best Supporting Female	Nominated	
Gotham Awards	2006	A Prairie Home Companion	Best Ensemble Cast	Nominated	
Gotham Awards	2015	Grandma	Best Actress	Nominated	
LA Film Festival Awards	2015	—N/a	Spirit of Independence Award	Won	
National Society of Film Critics Awards	1975	Nashville	Best Supporting Actress	Won	
New York Drama Critics' Circle Awards	1986	The Search for Signs of Intelligent Life in the Universe	Special Citation (Note: Shared with Jane Wagner)	Won	
New York Film Critics Circle Awards	1976	Nashville	Best Supporting Actress	Won	
New York Women in Film & Television Awards	1985	—N/a	Muse Award	Won	
Outer Critics Circle Awards	1986	The Search for Signs of Intelligent Life in the Universe	Outstanding Actress in a Play	Won	
Provincetown International Film Festival Awards	2000	—N/a	Lily Award	Won	
Satellite Awards	2006	A Prairie Home Companion	Best Supporting Actress – Motion Picture	Nominated	
Satellite Awards	2016	Grace and Frankie	Best Actress – Television Series Musical or Comedy	Nominated	
Saturn Awards	1982	The Incredible Shrinking Woman	Best Actress	Nominated	
Seattle International Film Festival Awards	1991	The Search for Signs of Intelligent Life in the Universe	Best Actress	Won	
Stinkers Bad Movie Awards	1979	Moment by Moment	Worst Actress	Nominated	
Stinkers Bad Movie Awards	1979	Moment by Moment	Worst On-Screen Couple (Note: Shared with John Travolta)	Won	
TCA Awards	2016	—N/a	TCA Career Achievement Award	Won	
US Comedy Festival Awards	2002	—N/a	Career Tribute	Won	
Venice Film Festival Awards	1993	Short Cuts	Special Volpi Cup for Ensemble Cast	Won	
Women Film Critics Circle Awards	2015	—N/a	Lifetime Achievement Award	Won	
Women in Film Crystal + Lucy Awards	1992	—N/a	Crystal Award	Won	
Women in Film Crystal + Lucy Awards	2003	—N/a	Lucy Award	Won	
Women's Image Network Awards	2012	Eastbound & Down	Outstanding Actress in a Comedy Series	Nominated	
Women's Image Network Awards	2015	Grandma	Outstanding Actress in a Feature Film	Won	
