= An Apology to Elephants =

- Promotional poster
- Directed by: Amy Schatz
- Written by: Jane Wagner
- Produced by: Amy Schatz; Beth Aala
- Starring: Pat Derby; Cynthia Moss; Raman Sukumar
- Narrated by: Lily Tomlin
- Cinematography: Alex Rappaport, Scott Sinkler
- Edited by: Tom Patterson
- Music by: Joby Talbot
- Distributed by: HBO
- Release date: April 12, 2013
- Running time: 40 minutes
- Country: United States
- Language: English

An Apology to Elephants is a 2013 documentary that explores abuse and brutal treatment of elephants. It showcases elephant training and the psychological trauma and physical damage done by living conditions in some zoos and circuses. It premiered on HBO on April 22, 2013, also celebrated as Earth Day. The documentary includes interviews with environmental activists and biologists, including Performing Animal Welfare Society co-founders Ed Stewart and Pat Derby. The film was dedicated to Derby, who spent her life rescuing performing animals. Also known as an "elephant lady", she died on February 15, 2013.

Narrator Lily Tomlin campaigned on the subject for several years, in the course of which she met Pat Derby. Later, she suggested that HBO make a movie about elephant captivity. HBO began work on the documentary in 2011. It was later joined by PETA, which offered pictures and video footage, including photos from a whistleblower depicting elephant training at the Ringling Bros circus.

== Synopsis ==
The documentary begins by showing the transfer of elephants from a train; the narrator states that "the elephants need our help". It proceeds with Joyce Poole, an elephant biologist, discussing some of the characteristics of an elephant, including mirror recognition capability. Cynthia Moss and Katy Payne explain some of the habits of elephants. While discussing anthropomorphism of elephants, Indian scientist Raman Sukumar states that elephants have a love–hate relationship with human society. The documentary then describes elephant capture for public display in circuses and zoos.

After describing the role of elephants in the environment, the documentary depicts some of the training techniques at circuses using bullhooks. It then shows an "elephant healing area" created in Northern California by Ed Stewart and Pat Derby, founders of Performing Animal Welfare Society. Derby tells the reunion story of Wanda, an elephant from Detroit Zoo, and Gypsy, from one of the circuses from Illinois, who were together in a circus in 1980 and bought together again in 2005. It describes various incidents of elephant communication and their emotional bonding; and it relates the story of Topsy from Luna Park, Coney Island, and her electrocution on January 4, 1903.

The documentary depicts new bullhook-free techniques implemented at Oakland Zoo for elephants; it ends by raising an alarm against the ivory trade, stating that the current elephant killing rate would lead to extinction of the species in ten years.

== Credits ==
Cast

- Pat Derby
- Colleen Kinzley
- Jeff Kinzley
- Ross MacPhee
- Cynthia Moss
- Joel Parrott
- Joyce Poole
- Mel Richardson
- Ed Stewart
- Raman Sukumar
- Katy Payne

== Reception ==
The documentary received generally positive feedback on release. The Variety magazine in its review noted that "An Apology to Elephants, in its best moments, is hard to forget" and is "an effective calling card for the animal-rights agenda". Sheri Linden reviewed the documentary for The Hollywood Reporter and mentioned that it is "a succinct, graceful argument to save an endangered species". Bloomberg noted that though the documentary tracks elephant abuse and also refrained from anthropomorphism of elephants, it does not focus on any of the responses from circus owners or enthusiasts. Emily Ashby from Common Sense Media mentioned in her review that though the documentary is "eye-opening on a longstanding animal-rights issue", it is one-sided and not advisable viewing for young children. A review from Postmedia News by Alex Strachan recommended the documentary as an "appropriate viewing on Earth Day" with huge demands for ivory trinkets from China.

After the documentary was premiered on HBO, Feld Inc. which is a parent company of Ringling Bros circus expressed that the documentary is a "one-sided hit piece". They mentioned that Amy Schatz contacted them to have "a full range of voices on the subject of elephants" but did not showcase anything saying "the Conservation Center isn't one HBO wants us to cover in the film". They also noted that the documentary has "an anti-circus political agenda". Later, HBO issued a statement in response to the allegation from Ringling Bros circus that the documentary "explores a wide range of issues surrounding [but] unfortunately not all can be included in the final film".
