= Joe Baltake =

American film critic (1945–2020)

- Joe Baltake, September 2004
- Born: Joseph John Baltake Jr. September 16, 1945; Camden, New Jersey
- Died: March 26, 2020 (aged 74); Haddonfield, New Jersey
- Education: Rutgers University
- Occupation: Film critic
- Years active: 1969–2004
- Employer(s): Print media (Gannett, Knight-Ridder, and McClatchy newspapers)
- Spouse: Susan Baltake (m. 1984)
- Website: thepassionatemoviegoer.blogspot.com

Joseph John Baltake Jr. (September 16, 1945 – March 26, 2020) was an American film critic, film historian, author of the film blog The Passionate Moviegoer, and a biographer of the actor Jack Lemmon. His work was syndicated by Knight-Ridder, Scripps Howard News Service, and the McClatchy wire services.

== Career ==
Baltake's film reviewing career started at Gannett's suburban newspaper group, where his critiques appeared in several New Jersey–based newspapers and continued at Knight-Ridder's The Philadelphia Daily News and McClatchy's The Sacramento Bee. He was the first-string film critic at both dailies. In all, he estimated that he professionally reviewed about 7,000 films throughout his career. He contributed articles on film to The Los Angeles Times, The New York Post, Us magazine, "The Scribner Encyclopedia of American Lives" (Volume Six, 2000-2002) and Films in Review, among others. Baltake also served on film festival juries, including the Philadelphia Film Festival.

== Bibliography ==
Film books he has written or edited include The Films of Jack Lemmon and its update, Jack Lemmon: His Films and Career, published in 1977 and 1986, respectively, in the United States by Citadel Press and in Canada and Great Britain by Columbus Books. He was also an associate editor of John Willis' Screen World, an annual film anthology from 1973 to 1993, when the anthology was published by Crown Books, and wrote the afterword for "The Films of Burt Reynolds" by Nancy Streebeck, published in 1982 by Citadel Press.

== Videography ==
Baltake has contributed commentaries to several DVD sets, including on-camera interviews for Sony Entertainment's The Jack Lemmon Film Collection and 20th Century Fox Home Entertainment's The Apartment collector edition.

== Accolades and honors ==
Writing awards given to Baltake included one from the Philadelphia Motion Picture Preview Group for "Honesty in Criticism" in 1986; "Best Commentary" award from the Society of Professional Journalists, for a review of the 1994 documentary, Hoop Dreams in 1995, and the "Outstanding Achievement" award from the Performing Animal Welfare Society/PAWS, in 1995 for "sensitive coverage of animal use in films" in a column on the mistreatment of animals, both simulated and real, on-screen.

== Personal life ==
A graduate of Rutgers University, Baltake was married to Susan Baltake, the founder of Grove Street Solutions, a consulting-marketing firm. He died of multiple myeloma on March 26, 2020.

== Footnotes ==
- Review of The Jack Lemmon Film Collection, June 12, 2 009
- Review of The Apartment: Collector's Edition, February 6, 2008
- Chris Lemmon's A Twist of Lemmon
- Nick Dawson's Being Hal Ashby: Life of a Hollywood Rebel
