= Lily Tomlin =

American actress (born 1939)

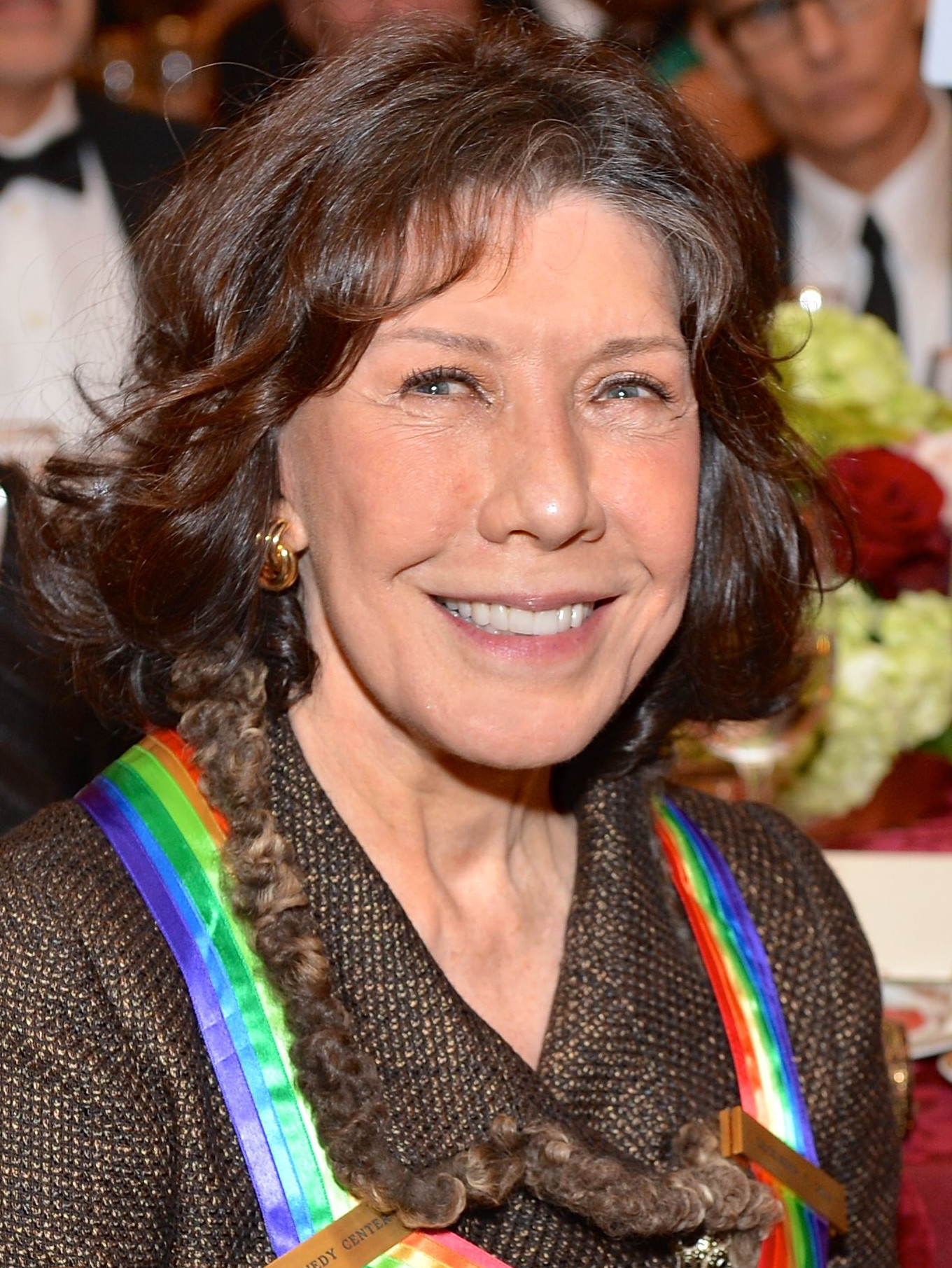
- Tomlin at the 2014 Kennedy Center Honors
- Born: Mary Jean Tomlin; September 1, 1939 (age 87); Detroit, Michigan, U.S.
- Education: Wayne State University
- Occupations: Actress; comedian; writer; singer; producer
- Years active: 1965–present
- Works: Full list
- Spouse: Jane Wagner (m. 2013)
- Awards: Full list
- Website: lilytomlin.com

Mary Jean "Lily" Tomlin (born September 1, 1939) is an American actress and comedian. Tomlin started her career in stand-up comedy and sketch comedy before transitioning her career to acting across stage and screen. In a career spanning more than fifty years, Tomlin has received numerous accolades, including seven Emmy Awards, a Grammy Award, two Tony Awards, and a nomination for an Academy Award. She was also awarded the Kennedy Center Honor in 2014 and the Screen Actors Guild Life Achievement Award in 2017.

Tomlin started her career as a stand-up comedian as well as performing off-Broadway during the 1960s. Her breakout role was on the variety show Rowan & Martin's Laugh-In from 1969 until 1973. Her signature role, which was written by her then-partner (now wife) Jane Wagner, was in the show The Search for Signs of Intelligent Life in the Universe, which opened on Broadway in 1985 and earned Tomlin the Tony Award for Best Actress in a Play. She won Emmy Awards for the special Lily (1973) and received a Grammy Award for Best Comedy Album for This Is a Recording (1972), the very first solo female to do so.

In 1975, Tomlin made her film debut with Robert Altman's Nashville, which earned her a nomination for the Academy Award for Best Supporting Actress. In 1977, her performance as Margo Sperling in The Late Show won her the Silver Bear for Best Actress and nominations for the Golden Globe and BAFTA Award for Best Actress. Her other notable films include The Incredible Shrinking Woman (1981), All of Me (1984), Big Business (1988), Flirting with Disaster (1996), Tea with Mussolini (1999), I Heart Huckabees (2004), A Prairie Home Companion (2006), Grandma (2015) and the voice of Aunt May in Spider-Man: Into the Spider-Verse (2018).

Tomlin is known for her collaborations with Jane Fonda starring in the films 9 to 5 (1980), 80 for Brady (2023), and Moving On (2023). She also starred with Fonda on the Netflix series Grace and Frankie, which ran for seven seasons from 2015 to 2022 and for which she received four Emmy nominations for Outstanding Lead Actress in a Comedy Series. From 2002 to 2006, she portrayed Deborah Fiderer on the Aaron Sorkin series The West Wing. She also voiced Ms. Frizzle for the children's animated series The Magic School Bus (1994–1997) and The Magic School Bus Rides Again (2017–2021).

== Early life and education ==
Tomlin was born in Detroit, Michigan, the daughter of Lillie Mae (née Ford; January 14, 1914 – July 12, 2005), a housewife and nurse aide, and Guy Tomlin (March 3, 1913 – October 24, 1970), a factory worker. She has a younger brother named Richard Tomlin. Tomlin's parents were Southern Baptists who moved to Detroit from Paducah, Kentucky, during the Great Depression. Although she attended a Southern Baptist church as a child, she later grew to become irreligious. She is a 1957 graduate of Cass Technical High School. Tomlin attended Wayne State University and originally studied biology. She auditioned for a play, and it sparked her interest in a career in the theatre and she changed her major. After college, Tomlin began doing stand-up comedy in nightclubs in Detroit and later in New York City. She continued studying acting at the HB Studio.

== Career ==
=== 1965–1974: Career beginnings and breakthrough ===
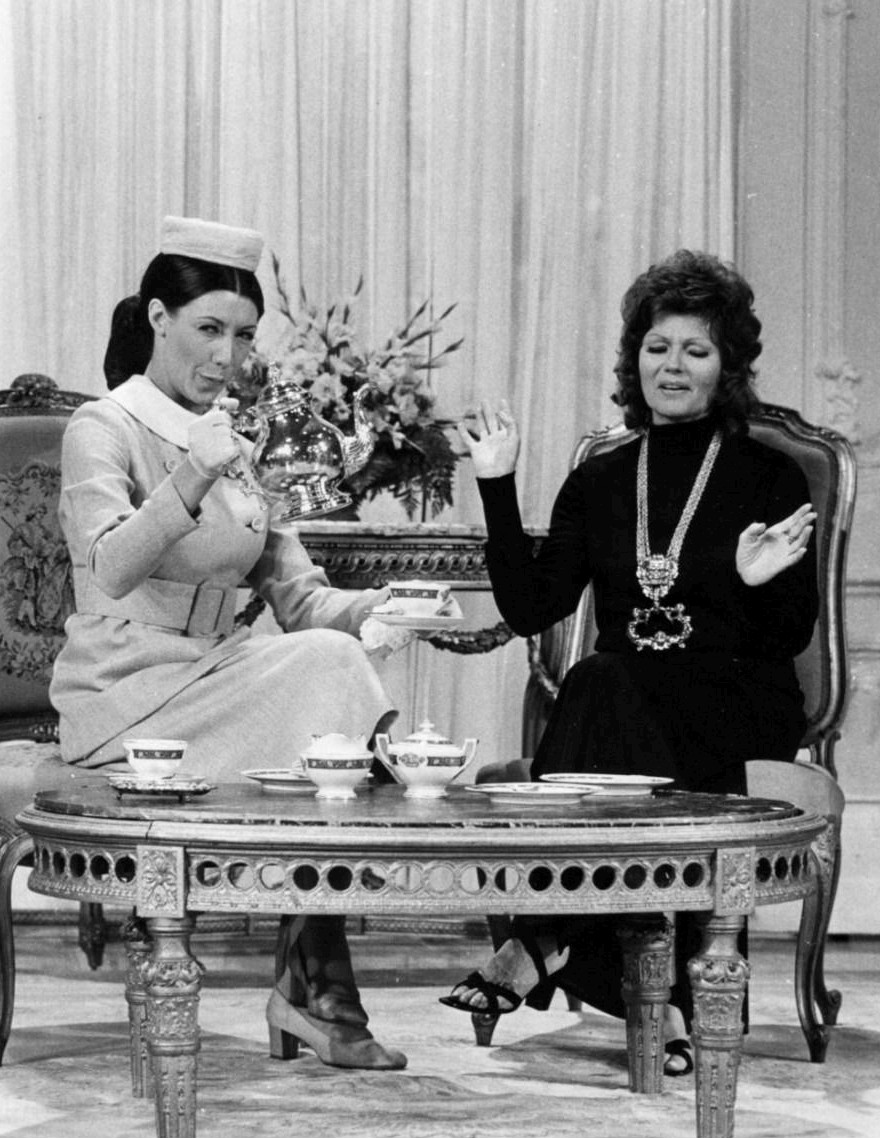
Tomlin as Mrs. Earbore (The Tasteful Lady) with Rita Hayworth on Rowan & Martin's Laugh-In (1971)

Tomlin's first television appearance was on The Merv Griffin Show in 1965. A year later, she became a cast member on the short-lived third and final incarnation of The Garry Moore Show.

Tomlin characters

In 1969, after a stint as a hostess on the ABC series Music Scene, Tomlin joined NBC's sketch comedy show Rowan and Martin's Laugh-In. Signed as a replacement for the departing Judy Carne, Tomlin was an instant success on the already established program, in which in addition to appearing in general sketches and delivering comic gags, she began appearing as the regular characters she created; they became well known and she portrayed them outside of the show in later recordings and television specials:

- Ernestine was a brash, tough and uncompromising telephone operator who generally treated customers with little sympathy. Ernestine often snorted when she let loose a barbed response or heard something salacious; she also wore her hair in a 1940s hairstyle with a hairnet, although the character was contemporary. Her opening lines were often the comical "one ringy dingy... two ringy dingy", and, "Have I reached the party to whom I am speaking?" In the sketches, Ernestine was usually at her switchboard taking calls. She occasionally phoned her boyfriend, Vito, a telephone repair man, or her pal Phenicia, another operator.
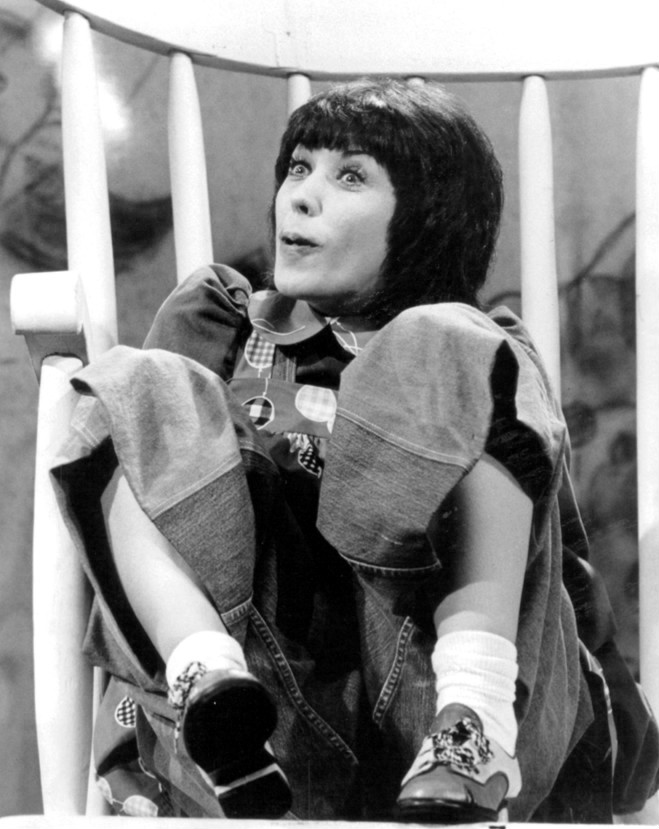
  Tomlin as Edith Ann, 1975
  Tomlin reprised the role in 2016 for a TV ad as part of PETA's campaign against SeaWorld. Tomlin has also reprised the role on several episodes of Sesame Street.
- Edith Ann is a precocious five-and-a-half-year-old girl who waxes philosophical on everyday life, either about life as a kid or things for which she feels she has the answers, although she is too young to fully understand. She often ends her monologues with "And that's the truth", punctuating it with a noisy raspberry. Edith Ann sits in an oversized rocking chair (to make Tomlin seem child-sized) with her rag doll, Doris, and often talks of life at home with her battling parents and bullying older sister, Mary Jean (Lily Tomlin's given birth names). Edith Ann has an oversized, playfully aggressive dog named Buster and a boyfriend named Junior Phillips, a possibly unrequited love. (Only Edith Ann and "Doris" appear in the Edith Ann sketches.) Tomlin reprised the character for a series of sketches on Sesame Street in the 1970s, and voiced her in three prime-time cartoon specials in the 1990s (including Edith Ann: A Few Pieces of the Puzzle).
- Mrs. Judith Beasley is a housewife and mother from Calumet City, Illinois, who is often chosen for television commercials and offers "good consumer advice". She appears in the film The Incredible Shrinking Woman as the lead character's neighbor.
- Mrs. Earbore (The Tasteful Lady) is a somewhat prudish and prissy, conservatively dressed middle-aged apolitical woman who dispenses advice on gracious living and a life of elegance.
- Susie the Sorority Girl is a blonde collegiate who could be the Tasteful Lady's daughter. Humorless and melodramatic, her biggest worries are the likes of who took her missing album by The Carpenters.
- The Consumer Advocate Lady is a dour, austere woman who rigidly inspects and tests products for their alleged value. The Consumer Advocate Lady is something of a variation of Mrs. Beasley.
- Lucille the Rubber Freak is a woman addicted to eating rubber, whose monologue details her habit from its beginning (chewing the eraser on pencils) to her obsessive rock bottom (eating the tip off mother's cane). Tomlin performed this character as part of her Laugh-In audition.
- Tess/Trudy is a homeless bag lady who accosts theater-goers and various passers-by with her offbeat observations and tales of communications with extraterrestrials. ("They don't care if you believe in 'em or not—they're different from God.")
- Bobbi-Jeanine is a showbiz veteran of the lounge circuit where she sings and plays organ. She often dispenses advice. ("It's not called Show Art, it's Show Business.")

Tomlin was one of the first female comedians to break out in male drag with her characters Tommy Velour and Rick. In 1982, but later popularized by a Saturday Night Live appearance on January 22, 1983, she premiered Purvis Hawkins, a black rhythm-and-blues soul singer (patterned after Luther Vandross), with a mustache, beard, and close-cropped afro hairstyle, dressed in a three-piece suit. Tomlin used very little, if any, skin-darkening cosmetics as part of the character, instead depending on stage lighting to create the effect.

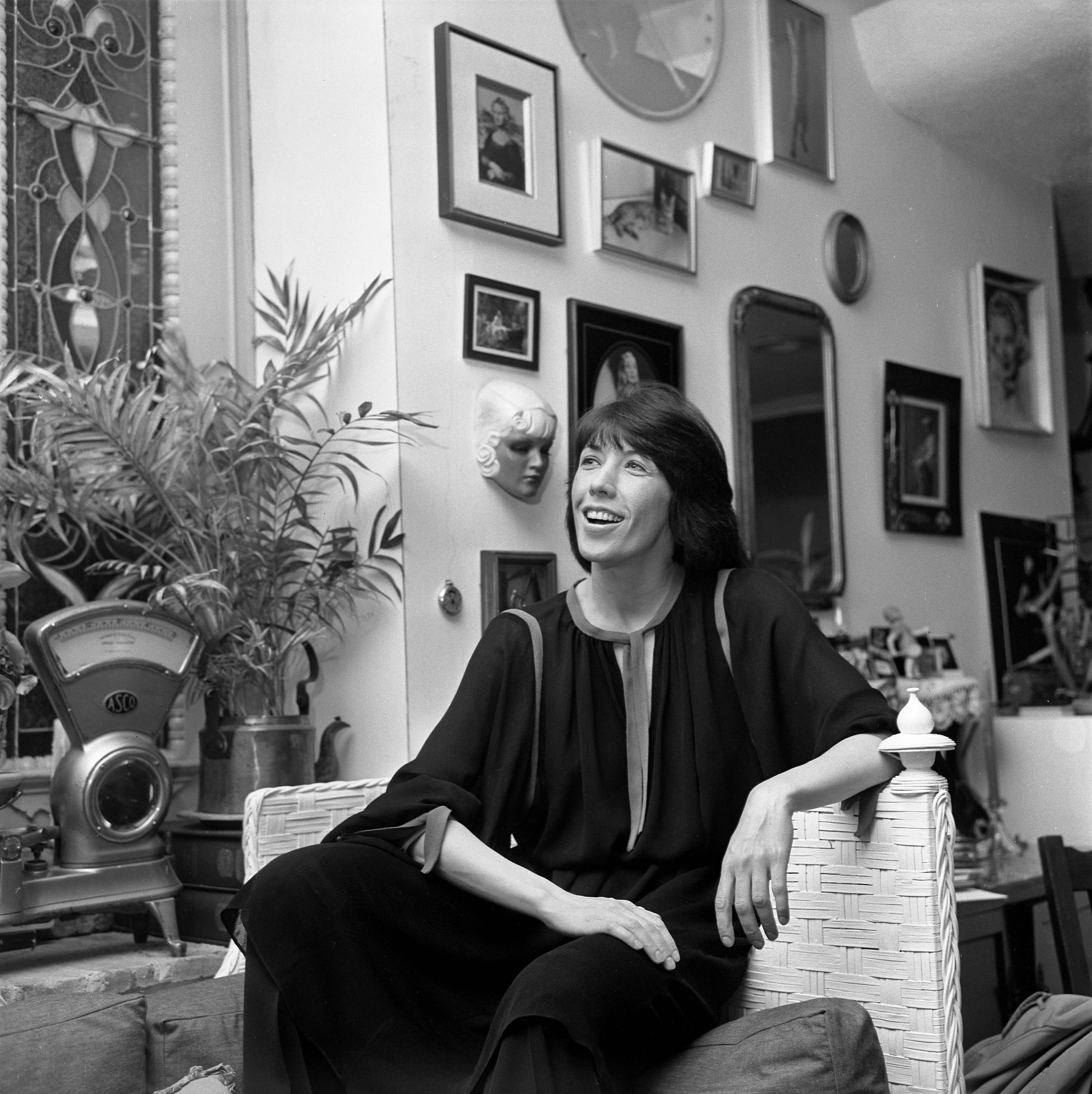
Tomlin in 1976

In 1970, AT&T offered Tomlin $500,000 to play her character Ernestine in a commercial, but she declined, saying it would compromise her artistic integrity. In 1976, she appeared on Saturday Night Live as Ernestine in a Ma Bell advertisement parody in which she proclaimed, "We don't care, we don't have to...we're the phone company." The character later made a guest appearance at The Superhighway Summit at UCLA on January 11, 1994, interrupting a speech being given on the information superhighway by then-Vice President Al Gore. She appeared as three of her minor characters in a 1998 ad campaign for Fidelity Investments that did not include Ernestine or Edith Ann. In 2003, she made two commercials as an "updated" Ernestine for WebEx. Tomlin brought Edith Ann to the forefront again in the 1990s with three animated prime-time television specials. She published Edith Ann's "autobiography", My Life (1995), co-written with Jane Wagner.

Tomlin released her first comedy album, This Is a Recording, on Polydor Records in March 1971 that contained Ernestine's run-ins with customers over the phone. The album hit No. 15 on the Billboard Hot 200, becoming (and remaining as of 2011) the highest-charting album ever by a solo comedienne. She earned a Grammy award that year for Best Comedy Recording. Tomlin's second album, 1972's And That's the Truth, featuring her character Edith Ann, was nearly as successful, peaking at No. 41 on the chart and earning another Grammy nomination. (Tomlin has two of the three top-charting female comedy albums on Billboard, sandwiching a 1983 Joan Rivers release.)

=== 1975–1989: Film stardom and acclaim ===
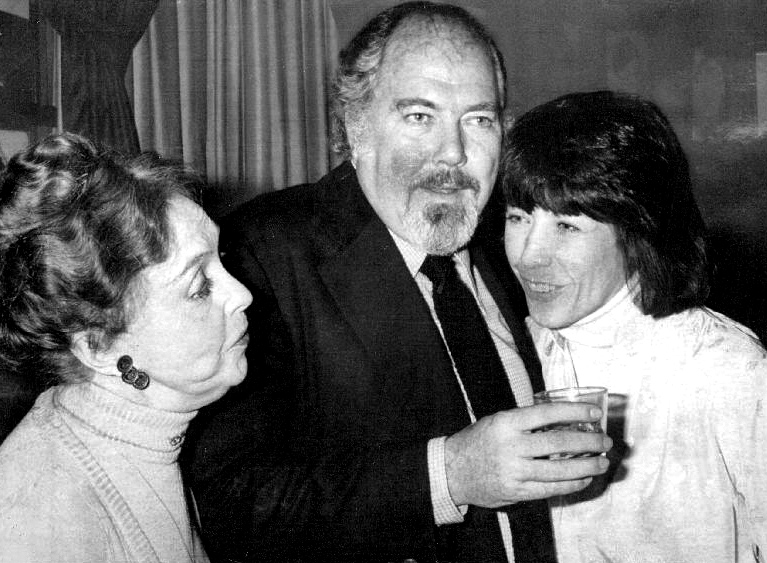
Lillian Gish, Robert Altman and Tomlin in 1976

Tomlin made her dramatic debut in Robert Altman's Nashville (1975), for which she was nominated for a Golden Globe Award for Best Supporting Actress and an Academy Award for Best Supporting Actress; she played Linnea Reese, a straitlaced, gospel-singing mother of two deaf children who has an affair with a womanizing country singer (played by Keith Carradine). The Oscar that year went to Lee Grant for her role in Shampoo. A comedy-mystery, The Late Show, teaming Tomlin with Art Carney, was a critical success in 1977. One of the few widely panned projects of Tomlin's career was 1978's Moment by Moment, directed and written by Wagner, which teamed Tomlin in a cross-generational older woman/younger man romance with John Travolta. Tomlin's third comedy album, 1975's Modern Scream, a parody of movie magazines and celebrity interviews, featured her performing as multiple characters, including Ernestine, Edith Ann, Judith, and Suzie. Her 1977 release Lily Tomlin On Stage was an adaptation of her Broadway show that year. Each of these albums earned Tomlin additional Grammy nominations. Tomlin recorded a single/EP called "The Last Duet" with Barry Manilow in 1980.

In March 1977, Tomlin made her Broadway debut in the solo show Appearing Nitely, which she co-wrote and co-directed with Jane Wagner, at the Biltmore Theatre. She received a Special Tony Award for this production. The same month, she made the cover of Time with the headline "America's New Queen of Comedy". Her solo show then toured the country and was made into a record album titled On Stage. In 1980, Tomlin co-starred in 9 to 5, in which she played a secretary named Violet Newstead who joins coworkers Jane Fonda and Dolly Parton in seeking revenge on their boss, Franklin M. Hart Jr., played by Dabney Coleman. The film was one of the year's top-grossing films. Tomlin then starred in the 1981 science fiction comedy The Incredible Shrinking Woman, playing three roles (a fourth, a reprise of her Edith Ann character, was cut from the theatrical print, but footage of this character was included in some later TV showings.) The film, a send-up of consumerism, was written by Wagner and met with mixed reviews.

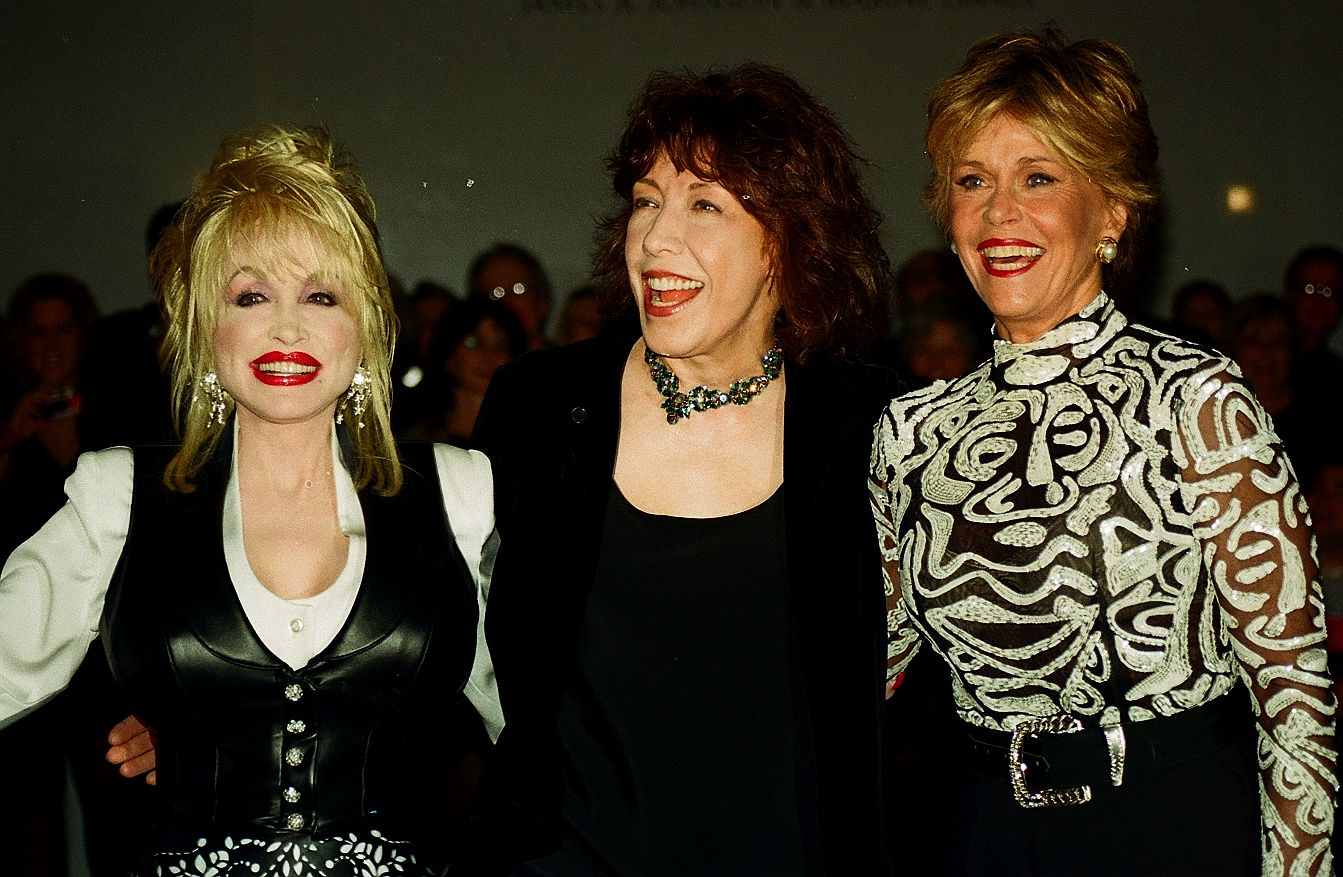
Dolly Parton, Tomlin, and Jane Fonda starred in 9 to 5 (1980)

Tomlin bounced back with the critical and financial hit All of Me (1984), opposite Steve Martin, in which she played a sickly heiress whose spirit became trapped in Martin's body. In 1985, Tomlin starred in another one-woman Broadway show The Search for Signs of Intelligent Life in the Universe, written by her long-time life partner, writer/producer Jane Wagner. The show won her a Tony Award and was made into a feature film in 1991. Tomlin revived the show for a run on Broadway in 2000 which then toured the country through mid-2002. In 1989, she won the Sarah Siddons Award for her work in Chicago theater. Tomlin premiered her one-woman show Not Playing with a Full Deck at the MGM Grand in Las Vegas in November 2009. It was her first appearance in that city, though she did tape an Emmy-winning TV special, a spoof of Las Vegas called Lily: Sold Out which premiered on CBS in January 1981. Tomlin and Bette Midler played two pairs of identical twins who were switched at birth in the 1988 comedy Big Business.

=== 1990–2009: Continued work and The West Wing ===
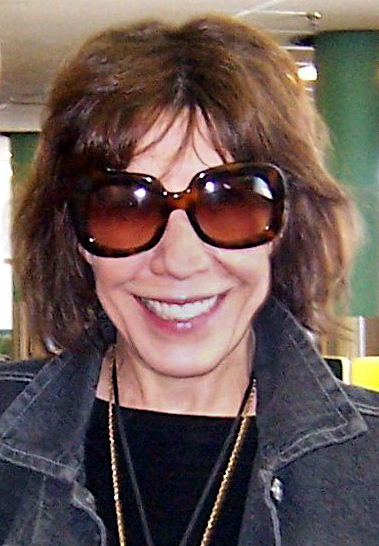
Tomlin in 2008

Tomlin also played chain-smoking waitress Doreen Piggott in Altman's 1993 ensemble film Short Cuts, based on stories by Raymond Carver. Tomlin voiced Ms. Valerie Frizzle on the animated television series The Magic School Bus from 1994 to 1997. Also, in the 1990s, Tomlin appeared on the popular sitcom Murphy Brown as the title character's boss. In 1995 she appeared on an episode of Homicide: Life on the Street as a murder suspect being transported to Baltimore. She also guest starred on The X-Files in 1998, in episode 6 ("How The Ghosts Stole Christmas") of season 6 as a ghost haunting an old mansion. In 2005 and 2006, she had a recurring role as Will Truman's boss Margot on Will & Grace. She appeared on the dramatic series The West Wing for four years (2002–2006) in the recurring role of presidential secretary Deborah Fiderer. Tomlin performed in two films by director David O. Russell; she appeared as a peacenik Raku artist in Flirting with Disaster and later as an existential detective in I Heart Huckabees. In March 2007, two videos were leaked onto YouTube portraying on-set arguments between Russell and Tomlin, in which among other things he called her sexist names. When the Miami New Times asked Tomlin about the videos, she responded, "I love David. There was a lot of pressure in making the movie—even the way it came out you could see it was a very free-associative, crazy movie, and David was under a tremendous amount of pressure. And he's a very free-form kind of guy anyway."

Tomlin collaborated again with director Robert Altman in what would prove to be his last film, A Prairie Home Companion (2006). She played Rhonda Johnson, one-half of a middle-aged Midwestern singing duo partnered with Meryl Streep. Tomlin provided a voice for the film Ponyo on the Cliff by the Sea, which was released in August 2009. In the 2008–2009 fifth season of Desperate Housewives, she had a recurring role as Roberta, the sister of Karen McCluskey (played by Kathryn Joosten who coincidentally had played Tomlin's secretarial predecessor on The West Wing). During the 2008 Emmy Awards, Tomlin appeared as part of a tribute to the influential 1960s television series Laugh-In. Tomlin voiced Tammy in the 2005 The Simpsons episode "The Last of the Red Hat Mamas".

Since its launch in 2008, Tomlin has been a contributor for wowOwow.com, a website for women to talk culture, politics, and gossip. Tomlin and Kathryn Joosten were in talks to star in a Desperate Housewives spin-off, which was given the green light in May 2009. The series plan was scrapped due to Joosten's illness, a recurrence of lung cancer; Joosten died on June 2, 2012, twenty days after the onscreen death from cancer of her character, Karen McCluskey. In 2010, Tomlin guest-starred as Marilyn Tobin in the third season of Damages opposite Glenn Close, for which she was nominated for an Emmy. She also appeared in the NCIS episode titled "The Penelope Papers", playing Penelope Langston, the grandmother of Agent Timothy McGee (Sean Murray). In 2012, Tomlin guest starred on the HBO series Eastbound and Down as Tammy Powers, mother of the main character Kenny Powers, and appeared in three episodes of Season 3. Tomlin co-starred with Reba McEntire in the TV series Malibu Country as Reba's character's mother Lillie Mae. The series started shooting in August 2012 with a premiere date of November 2, 2012, at 8:30 pm ET but was canceled in 2013 after 18 episodes.

=== 2015–present: Grace and Frankie and resurgence ===
From 2015 to 2022, Tomlin starred opposite Jane Fonda, Martin Sheen, and Sam Waterston in the Netflix original comedy series Grace and Frankie. Tomlin plays Frankie Bergstein, recently separated from her husband of forty years (Waterston) while Fonda plays Grace Hanson, recently separated from her husband (Sheen). Grace and Frankie become reluctant friends after learning their husbands are leaving them to be with one another. She received her first Primetime Emmy Award for Outstanding Lead Actress in a Comedy Series in 2015. In 2015, Tomlin starred in filmmaker Paul Weitz's film Grandma, which Weitz said was inspired by Tomlin. It garnered rave reviews and earned Tomlin a Golden Globe Award nomination.

Tomlin reprised her role as Professor Frizzle in the 2017 Netflix sequel The Magic School Bus Rides Again, a continuation of the original series. In 2018, she had a small role voicing Aunt May in the critically acclaimed animated film Spider-Man: Into the Spider-Verse.

== Personal life ==
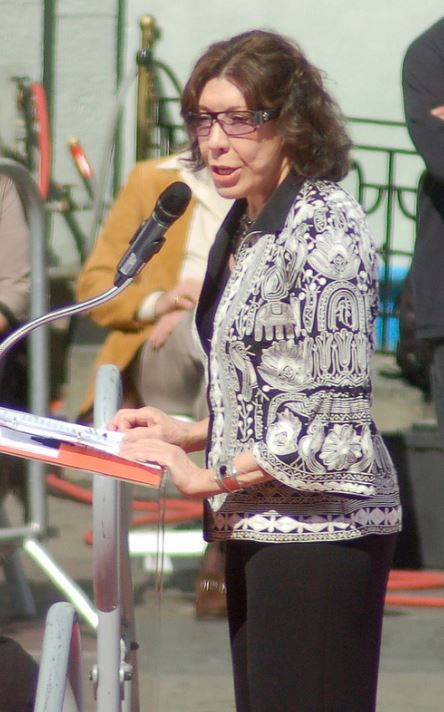
Tomlin in April 2013

=== Marriage ===
Tomlin met her future wife, writer Jane Wagner, in March 1971. After watching the after-school TV special J.T. written by Wagner, Tomlin invited Wagner to Los Angeles to collaborate on Tomlin's comedy LP album And That's The Truth. The couple did not have a formal coming out. Tomlin said in 2006:

I certainly never called a press conference or anything like that. [Back in the 1970s,] people didn't write about it. Even if they knew, they would [refer to Jane as] "Lily's collaborator", things like that. Some journalists are just motivated by their own sense of what they want to say or what they feel comfortable saying or writing about. In '77, I was on the cover of Time. The same week I had a big story in Newsweek. In one of the magazines it says I live alone, and the other magazine said I live with Jane Wagner. Unless you were so really adamantly out, and had made some declaration at some press conference, people back then didn't write about your relationship. In '75 I was making the Modern Scream album and Jane and I were in the studio. My publicist called me and said, "Time will give you the cover if you'll come out." I was more offended than anything that they thought we'd make a deal. But that was '75—it would have been a hard thing to do at that time.

Tomlin stated in 2008, "Everybody in the industry was certainly aware of my sexuality and of Jane ... in interviews, I always reference Jane and talk about Jane, but they don't always write about it." In 2015, Tomlin said, "I wasn't totally forthcoming. Everybody in the business knew I was gay, and certainly everybody I worked with and everything like that." Tomlin has been generally quiet about her sexuality. On December 31, 2013, Tomlin and Wagner married in a private ceremony in Los Angeles after 42 years together.

=== Beliefs and activism ===
Tomlin has been involved in a number of feminist and gay-friendly film productions, and on her 1975 album Modern Scream she pokes fun at straight actors who make a point of distancing themselves from their gay and lesbian characters—answering the pseudo-interview question, she replies: "How did it feel to play a heterosexual? I've seen these women all my life, I know how they walk, I know how they talk ..." In 2013, Tomlin and Wagner worked together on the film An Apology to Elephants, which Wagner wrote and Tomlin narrated.

== Acting credits and accolades ==
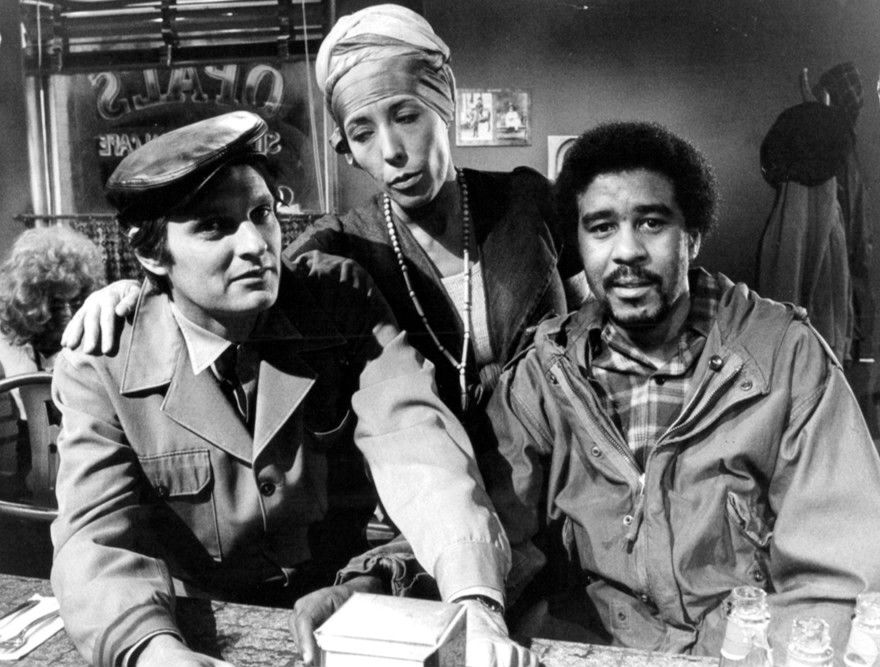
Alan Alda, Tomlin and Richard Pryor in Lily (1973)

Tomlin has received numerous accolades throughout her career, including seven Emmy Awards, two Tony Awards and a Grammy Award, in addition to a nomination for an Academy Award.

Her first two Emmy Awards were for her 1973 special Lily, followed by another three for the specials Lily Tomlin (1976), The Paul Simon Special (1978) and Lily: Sold Out (1981), a Daytime Emmy for voicing Miss Frizzle in the animated children's series The Magic School Bus (1994–1997), and her seventh one for narrating the 2013 documentary An Apology to Elephants. Tomlin won the Grammy Award for Best Comedy Recording in 1972 for This Is a Recording (1971). She received a Special Tony Award in 1977 and later won the Tony Award for Best Actress in a Play for her performance in the one-woman play The Search for Signs of Intelligent Life in the Universe (1986). Tomlin's performance of a gospel singer in the musical satire film Nashville (1975) earned her a nomination for the Academy Award for Best Supporting Actress, making her one of few artists to receive nominations for all four major American entertainment awards (EGOT). Additionally—having won the Emmy, Grammy and Tony—Tomlin is just the Oscar away from achieving both the Triple Crown of Acting and EGOT.

Tomlin's performance in the mystery film The Late Show (1977) earned her nominations for the BAFTA and Golden Globe Award for Best Actress. She received another two nominations for the Golden Globe Award for Best Actress in a Motion Picture – Comedy or Musical for her performances in All of Me (1984) and Grandma (2015). Tomlin's critically acclaimed role as quirky artist Frankie Bergstein in the Netflix comedy series Grace and Frankie (2015–2022) earned her nominations for another Golden Globe Award, four consecutive Primetime Emmy Awards, and three consecutive SAG Awards.

In 1992, Tomlin was awarded the Women in Film Crystal Award. Tomlin was inducted into the Michigan Women's Hall of Fame in 1998. In 2003, she was awarded the Mark Twain Prize for American Humor and was recognized again by Women in Film with the Lucy Award in recognition of her excellence and innovation in her creative works that have enhanced the perception of women through the medium of television. In March 2009, Tomlin received Fenway Health's Dr. Susan M. Love Award for her contributions to women's health. On March 16, 2012, Tomlin and her partner Jane Wagner received a star on the Palm Springs Walk of Stars. In December 2014, she was one of five honorees for the annual Kennedy Center Honors. In January 2017, Tomlin won the Screen Actors Guild Life Achievement Award at the 23rd SAG Awards ceremony. In 2022, Tomlin received the Career Achievement Peabody Award. Tomlin's 1971 album This Is a Recording was selected for the National Recording Registry by the Library of Congress in 2024.

== Bibliography ==
- Tomlin, Lily, and Jane Wagner (1977). On Stage. New York: Arista. Recorded live at the Biltmore Theatre, New York City. Audio book on LP. OCLC 858894156.
- Wagner, Jane, Elon Soltes, Wendy Apple, and Lily Tomlin (1992). Appearing Nitely. Valley Village, Calif.: Tomlin and Wagner Theatricalz. Recorded live at the Huntington Hartford Theater in Los Angeles, Calif. Originally produced for television in 1978. Video recording. OCLC 28219227.
- Wagner, Jane (1994). Edith Ann: My Life, So Far. New York: Hyperion. As told to and illustrated by Jane Wagner. ISBN 978-0-786-86120-0. OCLC 31236871.
- Tomlin, Lily, Jane Wagner, and Anna Deavere Smith (1994). Conversation with Lily Tomlin and Jane Wagner, October 25, 1994. San Francisco: City Arts & Lectures. Masonic Auditorium. OCLC 743427376.
- Wagner, Jane (2000). J.T. New York: Carousel Films. DVD. Originally broadcast in 1969. Jeannette Du Bois, Theresa Merritt, Kevin Hooks. OCLC 63681705.
- Tomlin, Lily, and Jane Wagner (2003). And That's the Truth. United States: Universal Music Enterprises. Recorded live at The Ice House, Pasadena, March 1976. Audio book. OCLC 212930925.
- Tomlin, Lily, and Jane Wagner (2005). The Search for Signs of Intelligent Life in the Universe. Tarzana, Calif.: Laugh.com. 1992 HBO television film. A film adaptation of the Broadway play by Jane Wagner. OCLC 63664207.
- Wagner, Jane, Marilyn French, and Lily Tomlin (2012). The Search for Signs of Intelligent Life in the Universe. New York: ItBooks, an imprint of HarperCollinsPublishers. Reprint. Originally published: New York: Harper & Row, 1986. Based on the Broadway play written by Wagner starring Lily Tomlin. Includes an afterword by Marilyn French and reflections by Lily Tomlin and by Jane Wagner. ISBN 978-0-062-10737-4. OCLC 798732509.
- Wagner, Jane C., and Tina DiFeliciantonio (2013). Girls Like Us. New York: Women Make Movies. Originally produced as a motion picture documentary film in 1997. DVD. OCLC 843761980.
