= Grandma (2015 film) =

2015 film by Paul Weitz

- Theatrical release poster
- Directed by: Paul Weitz
- Written by: Paul Weitz
- Produced by: Terry Dougas; Paris Kasidokostas-Latsis; Andrew Miano; Paul Weitz
- Starring: Lily Tomlin; Julia Garner; Marcia Gay Harden; Judy Greer; Laverne Cox; Sam Elliott
- Cinematography: Tobias Datum
- Edited by: Jonathan Corn
- Music by: Joel P. West
- Production companies: 1821 Media; Depth of Field
- Distributed by: Sony Pictures Classics
- Release dates: January 30, 2015 (Sundance); August 21, 2015 (United States)
- Running time: 79 minutes
- Country: United States
- Language: English
- Budget: $600,000
- Box office: $7.2 million

Grandma is a 2015 American comedy-drama film written, directed, and produced by Paul Weitz. It stars Lily Tomlin as Elle, a lesbian poet and widow whose teenage granddaughter (played by Julia Garner) visits her to ask for money for an abortion. Over the space of a day, they visit numerous people from Elle's past to call in favors in an effort to raise the money.

Weitz wrote the script with Tomlin in mind after working with her on the 2013 film Admission. After she agreed to star, they edited the script together. Most of the other cast members were actors with whom Weitz had previously collaborated. The film was shot over 19 days in Los Angeles in 2014 with a budget of less than $600,000.

The film premiered at the 2015 Sundance Film Festival as the closing night feature and was released on August 21, 2015, by Sony Pictures Classics. It grossed $7.1 million at the box office and was well received by critics. The film was named among the top ten independent films of 2015 by the National Board of Review, and Tomlin was nominated for a Golden Globe Award for her performance.

== Plot ==
Elle is a lesbian poet coping with the recent death of her long-term life partner. She ends a four-month relationship with a younger admirer, Olivia, telling her their relationship meant nothing, before receiving a visit from her 18-year-old granddaughter Sage. Sage is pregnant and requests $630 for an abortion, which is scheduled for that afternoon. As Elle is broke and Sage has had her credit card confiscated by her overbearing mother, the two embark on a road trip across Los Angeles to try and come up with the money.

Elle forcefully extorts $50 from the father of the child, and then tries to call in a $400 debt from her transgender friend Deathy, a tattoo artist. Because she is also broke at the time, Deathy cannot help them beyond some $60 she borrows from the register, but gives Elle a new tattoo that looks like the letter "O". Sage presumes this to be Olivia's initial, though Elle insists it is only meant to be a circle. Elle tries to sell some of her rare books to an acquaintance, Carla, who owns a café, but gets into a fight with Olivia, who is working there. Elle storms out when Carla, who is much more tech-savvy than Elle, gauges the price of the books on eBay and offers her a paltry $60, and Olivia berates her as they leave.

Becoming desperate, Elle and Sage visit Elle's ex-husband Karl, whom Elle has not seen in decades. She tells him she needs to borrow the money for rent, and he requests a kiss in return. This leads to an argument over how Elle ended their relationship, but when she pleads with him, he agrees to hand over the cash. When he asks her to be honest about the reason for needing the money, Sage & Elle tell him that she needs an abortion, and Karl becomes angry and emotional. Elle once aborted his child without telling him, yet went on to give birth to a baby born from a one-night stand. She explains that she wanted a child but not a husband, and Karl angrily insists he will not pay for an abortion.

Sage and Elle work up the courage to visit Sage's busy single mother, Judy, who is furious to learn Sage is pregnant. Judy reluctantly produces the money and Elle drives Sage to the abortion clinic. After receiving an abortion, Judy forgives Sage and takes her home. On her own way home, Elle giggles and rejoices at memories of her partner Violet. Before reaching home, she makes a short stop at Olivia's house to apologize for saying their relationship meant nothing, and they kiss. Afterwards, Elle walks down the sidewalk, laughing on her way home.

== Cast ==
- Lily Tomlin as Elle Reid
- Julia Garner as Sage
- Marcia Gay Harden as Judy
- Judy Greer as Olivia
- Sam Elliott as Karl
- Laverne Cox as Deathy
- Elizabeth Peña as Carla
- Judy Geeson as Francesca
- Nat Wolff as Cam
- John Cho as Chau
- Mo Aboul-Zelof as Ian
- Missy Doty as Mom
- Sarah Burns as Protestor

== Themes ==
I was really interested in this idea that somebody that is in their 70s can be more transgressive and have a more passionate voice than this person who is 18.

— Paul Weitz

Numerous commentators have labelled Grandma a feminist film. Bustle writer Rachel Simon commented on the unusual fact that the film centers on two women – a septuagenarian lesbian and a pregnant teenager seeking an abortion – and features a supporting cast of characters including "another lesbian, a trans woman, and a single mom who got pregnant using a sperm donor". Writer-director Paul Weitz said that he wanted to explore different eras of women's history through the three generations of Elle's family. While Elle was a fighter for women's equality, he saw Judy (a successful businesswoman) as "a product of it". He said that Sage, who is largely ignorant of the feminist movement, represented the "erasure of women's history in the minds of young people now". Variety critic Scott Foundas described Grandma as "an unforced but unmistakably political survey of three generations of independent womanhood in America".

The film has also been described as pro-choice because of its portrayal of abortion. Weitz was influenced by the lack of mainstream films that depict abortion, saying, "there have been a lot of movies in the past which were unwilling to even use the word, despite millions of women having abortions ... So I just wanted it to be real." Several critics praised the film's balanced treatment of abortion: Ty Burr of The Boston Globe wrote that it was "neither minimized nor built up into a Major Statement", while the Financial Times' Danny Leigh appreciated that "the sad gravity of the premise is not underplayed". The Independent critic Geoffrey McNab found it "heartening to see a film that tackles unintended pregnancy and abortion in a humorous and sensitive way".

== Production ==
Paul Weitz conceived the idea for the story of Grandma long before he began writing the script. He never completed the story until he had met and worked with Tomlin on the 2013 film Admission, saying that "After meeting Lily, the voice and the character really clicked, I had thought about it for years, so I had a lot of it worked out in my head, and then I just went to a coffee shop and wrote it longhand." He said that, as he wrote, he could hear her "performing it in [his] head". After writing the script, he was afraid to present it to Tomlin in case she turned down the lead role. Tomlin said that she immediately connected with the character and the story; she and Weitz then spent several months editing the script together. The film marked Tomlin's first leading role in 27 years, after co-starring with Bette Midler in the 1988 comedy film Big Business.

Most of the cast was made up of actors with whom Weitz had previously worked. He directed Marcia Gay Harden in American Dreamz and decided to cast her as Elle's daughter, since she was the only actress he suggested for the role whom Tomlin "seemed mildly intimidated by". He cast Nat Wolff and John Cho after working with them on Admission and American Pie, respectively; he had also worked with Judy Greer twice before. He contacted Sam Elliott through his brother, Chris Weitz, who had directed Elliott in The Golden Compass. Weitz offered the role of Sage to Julia Garner after seeing her performance in Electrick Children. He wrote Laverne Cox's character for her because he had seen her in Orange Is the New Black, and they refined the details of the character together.

Filming took place in and around Los Angeles in the spring of 2014, and was completed in 19 days after a week of rehearsal. Two scenes were shot in Paul and Chris Weitz's offices. The car driven by Elle, a 1955 Dodge Royal, is actually Tomlin's car; Tomlin also wore her own clothes for the role. The film's total production budget was under $600,000.

== Release ==
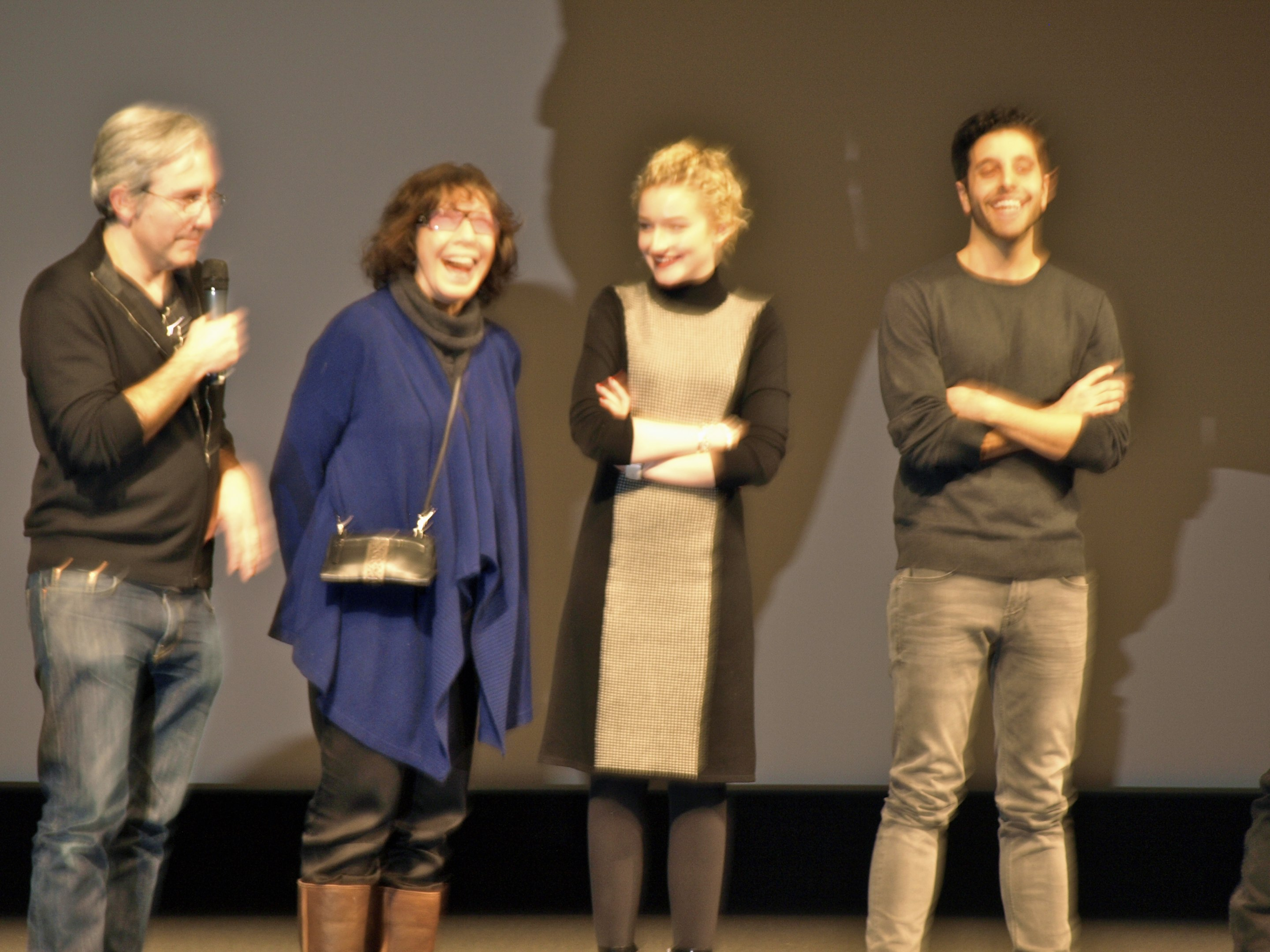
Director Paul Weitz with cast Lily Tomlin, Julia Garner and Mo Aboul-Zelof at the 2015 Sundance Film Festival

The film had its world premiere at the Sundance Film Festival on January 30, 2015, as the closing night film. Several days before its premiere, Sony Pictures Classics acquired worldwide distribution rights to the film. The film went on to screen at the Tribeca Film Festival on April 20, 2015, and opened the Los Angeles Film Festival on June 10. The film was given a limited release in the United States on August 21, 2015, earning $115,540 from four theaters during its opening weekend. It expanded to a wide release on September 18, and earned $1,501,101 from 1,061 theaters during its first weekend in wide release. Overall, the film grossed $6,980,524 over 28 weeks in North American theaters, and $106,928 internationally, for a total of $7,087,452.

Grandma was first released on DVD, Blu-ray and video on demand on February 9, 2016. The DVD and Blu-ray include an audio commentary with Weitz, Tomlin, Garner and Elliott, as well as a 21-minute interview with Weitz, Tomlin and Elliott. The Blu-ray version includes an additional 25-minute behind the scenes featurette.

== Reception ==
Grandma received a score of 91% on Rotten Tomatoes, based on 173 reviews, and an average rating of 7.5/10. The site's consensus reads, "Boasting a stellar performance from Lily Tomlin and some powerfully empathetic work from writer-director Paul Weitz, Grandma is a dramedy that shouldn't have to ask you to visit." Metacritic gives the film a score of 77 out of 100, based on reviews from 37 critics, indicating "generally favorable" reviews.

The New York Times film critic A. O. Scott praised the film's pacing, dialogue, and supporting performances, describing it as "wry and insightful". Scott Foundas of Variety called it "an initially breezy family comedy about mothers, daughters and abortions that slowly sneaks up on you and packs a major wallop", praising Weitz's dialogue and the "devastating" scene wherein Elle reunites with Karl. Writing for New York, David Edelstein declared that "Grandma marks a new era in gay cinema" and felt that the story was "schematic but heartfelt". Brian Moylan of The Guardian gave the film three out of five stars and wrote, "Possibly the greatest thing about Grandma is that it passes the Bechdel test with flying colours, better than any film I've seen recently." Slant Magazine's R. Kurt Osenlund, on the other hand, felt that the plot was contrived and unfulfilling, and described the film as having "about as many ambitions as it does delusions".

Tomlin has been widely praised for the strength of her performance. A. O. Scott wrote that "the wonder that is Grandma can be summed up in two words: Lily Tomlin." Peter Travers of Rolling Stone described the film as "a Tomlin tour de force" and wrote that "Tomlin, the sorceress, leaves you dazzled and devastated." The San Francisco Chronicle's David Lewis cited Grandma as a career-high performance for Tomlin, describing her work as "funny, acerbic, touching – and ultimately, exhilarating". Richard Roeper of the Chicago Sun-Times wrote of Tomlin, "nearly every moment in this movie is all hers", predicting award nominations for her performance. In a review of the film for The Boston Globe, Ty Burr offered the summary: "it stars Lily Tomlin, and that's all you really need to know".

=== Accolades ===
| Award | Date of ceremony | Category | Recipients | Result | Ref |
|---|---|---|---|---|---|
| Apolo Awards | January 8, 2016 | Best Film | Grandma | Nominated | |
| Apolo Awards | January 8, 2016 | Best Original Screenplay | Paul Weitz | Nominated | |
| Apolo Awards | January 8, 2016 | Best Actress | Lily Tomlin | Won | |
| Casting Society of America Artios Awards | 2016 | Low Budget – Comedy | Douglas Aibel, Henry Russell Bergstein | Nominated | |
| Chicago Film Critics Association | December 16, 2015 | Best Supporting Actor | Sam Elliott | Nominated | |
| Critics' Choice Awards | January 17, 2016 | Best Actress in a Comedy | Lily Tomlin | Nominated | |
| Dublin Film Critics' Circle | December 2015 | Best Actress | Lily Tomlin | Nominated | |
| Dorian Awards | January 2016 | LGBTQ Film of the Year | Paul Weitz | Nominated | |
| Dorian Awards | January 2016 | Unsung Film of the Year | Paul Weitz | Nominated | |
| GLAAD Media Awards | April 2, 2016 | Outstanding Film – Wide Release | Paul Weitz | Nominated | |
| Golden Globe Awards | January 10, 2016 | Best Actress – Motion Picture Comedy or Musical | Lily Tomlin | Nominated | |
| Gotham Independent Film Awards | November 30, 2015 | Best Actress | Lily Tomlin | Nominated | |
| National Board of Review | December 1, 2015 | Top Ten Independent Films | Paul Weitz | Won | |
