= And That's the Truth =

Live album by Lily Tomlin
- Released: 1972
- Venue: The Ice House; Pasadena, California
- Length: 49:32
- Label: Polydor
- Producer: Irene M. Pinn

And That's the Truth is a 1972 comedy album by Lily Tomlin released on Polydor Records. Tomlin recorded the album live before an audience at The Ice House in Pasadena, California.

The album features Tomlin as one of her most celebrated characters, five-and-a-half-year old Edith Ann, who hounds a new neighbor (also played by Tomlin) with her little dramas real and imagined, as well as sage advice and tales of her family's private life.

The album was Tomlin's second record release, following her Grammy-winning This Is A Recording. And That's The Truth earned Tomlin a second Grammy nomination as Best Comedy Recording and peaked at #41 on the Billboard Hot 200 album chart, the third highest ranking album ever on the chart by a female comedian, behind Tomlin's debut album and Joan Rivers' 1983 "What Becomes A Semi-Legend Most" (which peaked at #23).

The album was produced by Irene M. Pinn and conceived and written by Lily Tomlin and Jane Wagner with additional material by Jim Abell & Chet Dowling, Betty Beaird, Marian Brayton, Warren Burton, Susan Perkis Haven, Edward Morris, Richard Tomlin, and Bill Weeden & David Finkle.

== Track listing ==
Each side of the album runs approximately 20 minutes and is an ongoing monologue between Edith Ann and her neighbor "Lady", although the story passages on each side of the record are named individually. Side one is when the two meet walking on the street; side two is when Edith Ann shows up uninvited at the lady's house the next day.

Side One:

- Hey Lady
- I Always Kiss Buster
- My Sister Mary Jean
- Look in the Sky
- I Dressed Him Up
- Here's The Empty Lot
- Guess This Riddle
- I Can't Go To The Movies Here
- I Go To Sunday School
- Here's My House

Side Two:

- Lady Lady Open Up
- I Like Your Kitchen
- Do You Have Any Chewing Gum?
- Don't My Toes Look Pretty?
- I Will Help You Unpack
- Does This Chair Lean Back?
- Tell Me Something Lady
- Finish Putting The Groceries Away
- I Want You To Go
