= Raman Sukumar =

Indian ecologist (born 1955)

Raman Sukumar (born 1955) is an Indian ecologist best known for his work on the ecology of the Asian elephant and human–wildlife conflict. He also works on climate change, and tropical forest ecology.

== Early life and education ==
Raman Sukumar was born in India in 1955. He received his Bachelor of Science degree from the University of Madras in 1977 and did a Masters in botany at the same university. He obtained a PhD from the Indian Institute of Science in 1985.

== Career ==
In 1986, Sukumar helped to design the Nilgiri Biosphere Reserve, the first of its kind in India. In 1997, he set up the Asian Nature Conservation Foundation, a public charitable trust that incorporates the Asian Elephant Research and Conservation Centre, an organization that has carried out several field projects in India and other Asian countries on elephants and their habitats. In 1991, he was a Fulbright Fellow at Princeton University. From 2004–12, he was the Chair at the Centre for Ecological Sciences at the Indian Institute of Science for over eight years. He continues to pursue conservation-based scientific research as an honorary professor at this center and is often called upon to represent Indian wildlife scientists in international, national, and regional governmental committees.

== Awards ==
In 2006, he was awarded the International Cosmos Prize, Japan, the first Indian to receive this award. He was also commended by the Prime Minister of India for contributions to the Intergovernmental Panel on Climate Change (IPCC) that shared the Nobel Peace Prize in 2007.

== Awards and fellowships ==
- 1991: Presidential Award of the Chicago Zoological Society, USA
- 1997: Order of the Golden Ark (The Netherlands)
- 2000: Fellow of the Indian Academy of Sciences
- 2003: Whitley Gold Award for International Nature Conservation UK
- 2004: T. N. Khoshoo Memorial Award for Conservation Science, Ashoka Trust for Research in Ecology and Environment, India
- 2005: Fellow of the Indian National Science Academy
- 2006: International Cosmos Prize, Japan
- 2006: Fellow, Geological Society of India
- 2013: Fellow, The World Academy of Sciences, Italy

== Works ==
- The Asian Elephant: Ecology and Management (1989, Cambridge Univ. Press)
- Elephant Days and Nights: Ten years with the Indian Elephant (1994, Oxford Univ. Press)
- The Living Elephants: Evolutionary Ecology, Behavior and Conservation (2003, Oxford Univ. Press)
- The Story of Asia's Elephants (2011, Marg Publishers)
