= Debbie Fiderer =

American television character, created 2002

Deborah Fiderer
- The West Wing character
- Lily Tomlin as Debbie Fiderer
- First appearance: "Posse Comitatus"
- Last appearance: "Tomorrow"
- Created by: Aaron Sorkin
- Portrayed by: Lily Tomlin

In-universe information
- Nickname: Debbie
- Gender: Female
- Occupation: White House Personnel Aide (Season 1, unseen); Personal secretary to the president (Seasons 4-7)
- Spouse: Mr. DiLaguardia (divorced)
- Nationality: American

Deborah Fiderer (formerly DiLaguardia) is a fictional character in the NBC television series The West Wing. She is executive assistant to President Jed Bartlet, and is portrayed by actress and comedian Lily Tomlin. The character, known for being eccentric and her domineering personality, first appears briefly during the program's third season finale and appears regularly from the early fourth season through the end of the show.

== Casting ==
Lily Tomlin told the Chicago Tribune that she was a fan of The West Wing and had sent word through her agent that she was interested in appearing on the show. She had expected to be cast as a legislator, lobbyist, or a character like her friend, former Texas governor Ann Richards, and was pleasantly surprised to land the role of Debbie Fiderer.

== Character biography ==
The character of Debbie Fiderer is a former White House employee who was fired, and subsequently turned to alpaca farming and professional gambling. She interviews for the role as President Bartlet's personal secretary following the death of Mrs. Landingham.

Tomlin said that while she would never improvise in the role, she invented her own back story for the character including grown children, a failed second marriage, and a mother who is ill.

== Storylines ==
The character is initially referred to as Debbie DiLaguardia; she becomes Debbie Fiderer after a divorce. She is first referred to in dialogue during the first season episode "A Proportional Response" as the White House personnel office worker who recommends Charlie to serve as the President's personal assistant, even though he only applied for a position as a messenger. Her opinion is well-respected to the point that Josh Lyman immediately interviews and subsequently offers the role to Charlie.

After the death of President Bartlet's previous private secretary Dolores Landingham, Bartlet is extremely reluctant to hire a permanent replacement. Finally prevailed upon to do so by his White House staff, Bartlet expresses to Charlie Young an expectation that most of the proposed candidates will not meet with his approval. Charlie knows that the person for the job will need both the character and sense of humor that the President is looking for. Fiderer is opinionated, strong willed, eccentric, and very much her own woman; Charlie knows he has the perfect fit to replace Mrs. Landingham.

Before her initial interview with President Bartlet, Deborah takes anti-anxiety medication; when it didn't seem to work, she takes another, and by the time of the interview she is intoxicated. She reveals that she has been an alpaca farmer and a professional gambler. Before that, she worked in the White House personnel office, and when President Bartlet asked what happened, she says she was "screwed with her pants on." It is later revealed that she was fired for recommending Charlie as Bartlet's personal assistant, instead of the son of a powerful Democratic Party contributor. She refuses to reveal this detail in spite of Bartlet's explicit order to, further impressing him, even as he deduces the reason. In response to the administration's position on water supplies in the Third World, she had suggested in a letter sent to the White House that arsenic should be put 'in President Bartlet's water.' Bartlet is nevertheless impressed by her show of respect for the Office of the President, remarking that she'd written President Bartlet, and concludes she is a "class act".

After the First Lady, Debbie is the character most concerned with preventing the President from being overworked in light of his multiple sclerosis, to the point of having new telephone functions installed and creating and keeping an incredibly strict schedule for senior staff. She appears to gain some infamy for knowing about crises before the President or his secret service detail; Bartlet is very amused when, in the wake of the West Wing being struck by bullets, the Oval Office is flooded with Secret Service agents before Fiderer even appears. Throughout the course of the series, the two develop a friendly rapport.

Debbie says that she admires President Harry S. Truman. When asked her musical preference, she says she is "a Crazy Horse kind of girl." She also confesses to "a tempestuous affair with a rodeo cowboy during the Summer of Love that the Hollies played a significant role in."

In her final appearance, set on the day that Matt Santos assumes office, Fiderer is seen clearing out her desk and warning Ronna Beckman that she should never revoke the First Lady's walk-in privileges, even though the President will invariably plead with her to do so.

== Critical reception ==
Tomlin was nominated three times for a Screen Actors Guild Award for her role as Fiderer. In 2003, she received two nominations, one for Outstanding Performance by a Female Actor in a Dramatic Series and one for Outstanding Performance by an Ensemble in a Dramatic Series (shared with other West Wing co-stars). In 2005, Tomlin received another SAG nomination for Outstanding Ensemble, shared with her co-stars.

== See also ==
- List of The West Wing characters
