= Pat Derby =

Animal trainer and rights advocate (1942–2013)

Pat Derby (June 7, 1942 – February 15, 2013) was a British-born American animal trainer for American television programs during the 1960s and 1970s and later became an animal rights activist.

== Early years ==
Born Patricia Bysshe Shelley in Sussex, England, her father Charles was a professor of English literature at Cambridge University who claimed to be a descendant of Percy Bysshe Shelley. As a child she often begged her father to take her to the circus to see the elephants. At age 15 she moved to New York City to study ballet and theater. She also enrolled at Columbia University, but dropped out at age 19 to move to California. While performing at a San Francisco nightclub she met animal trainer Ted Derby, and they married in 1964. The couple operated Andersen Pea Soup Animal Park from 1970 to 1972 in Buellton, CA. The couple divorced in 1973.

== Career ==
The couple trained wild animals for television shows and movies, using "affection methods" that avoided causing pain for the animal. But Pat disagreed with Ted's use of an electric cattle prod in training, and they divorced in the mid-1970s. She trained animals for the CBS television series Lassie, Gentle Ben and Daktari and the NBC series Flipper. She also worked on the Lincoln-Mercury ad campaign that featured Farrah Fawcett with two cougars in the 1970s.

In 1976 Derby was working with Chauncey and Christopher, two of her cougars who appeared in Lincoln-Mercury commercials, at the Cleveland auto show when she met Ed Stewart. She and Stewart founded the Performing Animal Welfare Society (PAWS) in 1984. Derby's 1976 book The Lady and Her Tiger was a harsh expose of the entertainment industry's treatment of animals, and PAWS became a leading advocate for better treatment of animals in captivity. PAWS first animal sanctuary encompassed 30 acres outside Galt, California, and was the first in the United States capable of caring for elephants.

== Death ==
Derby died at her home in San Andreas, California following a long battle with throat cancer.
