= The Late Show (film) =

1977 film by Robert Benton

- Theatrical release poster by Richard Amsel
- Directed by: Robert Benton
- Written by: Robert Benton
- Story by: Rodolfo Sonego
- Produced by: Robert Altman; Scott Bushnell
- Starring: Art Carney; Lily Tomlin; Bill Macy; Eugene Roche; Joanna Cassidy
- Cinematography: Charles Rosher Jr.
- Edited by: Peter Appleton; Lou Lombardo
- Music by: Kenneth Wannberg
- Production company: Lion's Gate Films
- Distributed by: Warner Bros. Pictures
- Release date: February 10, 1977 (New York)
- Running time: 93 minutes
- Country: United States
- Language: English

The Late Show is a 1977 American neo-noir comedy-mystery film, written and directed by Robert Benton and produced by Robert Altman. It stars Art Carney, Lily Tomlin, Bill Macy, Eugene Roche, and Joanna Cassidy.

A drama with a few comic moments, the story follows an aging detective trying to solve the case of his partner's murder while dealing with a flamboyant new client.

Benton was nominated for the Academy Award for Best Original Screenplay in 1977.

== Plot ==
Ira Wells, an aging Los Angeles private detective, is writing his memoir at his boarding house when his ex-partner Harry Regan appears, mortally wounded, and dies shortly after. At Harry's funeral, Ira is introduced to Margo Sperling by a mutual acquaintance, Charlie Hatter. Margo asks Ira to locate her stolen cat Winston, and Ira learns Harry was murdered while on the case to find Margo's cat. Margo later tells Ira that Brian Hemphill hired her to transport merchandise to Bakersfield for him, but she stole the money and Brian kidnapped her cat, ransoming it to get back the money.

A man shows up outside Ira's house when Margo and Charlie are there. He's shot by another man who then shoots at the house. Ira shoots out one of the tires as he flees in a car, but the shooter escapes the ensuing crash. Charlie retrieves a collector's book of postage stamps from the corpse, which Ira demands. The stamps were stolen during a robbery in which Walter Whiting's wife was murdered. Charlie confesses that Harry had seen the robbery while he was trailing Brian, and he and Harry were planning to split the $15,000 reward.

Learning that Brian and his friend Ray Escobar were making deals with a fence named Ron Birdwell, Ira visits Birdwell and learns Brian's real name is Earl Hampton. Charlie reveals Escobar is hiding in Santa Monica and that Birdwell's wife Laura was having an extramarital affair. Ira and Margo find the cat at Escobar's residence, and Laura reveals Escobar had blackmailed her. Margo finds Escobar's body inside a refrigerator and Laura flees. Ira and Margo follow a car through a neighborhood until it crashes into another vehicle.

On an adrenaline rush, Margo wants to enter the private detective profession, and theorizes that Laura was having an affair with Mr. Whiting. Ira returns to Birdwell's residence where Birdwell reveals Mrs. Whiting had called him to have the affair stopped. Birdwell then has Whiting threatened but not killed. At an adult theater, Birdwell and Lamar ask Charlie to retrieve Escobar's revolver used in the murder.

Ira and Margo begin to bond, but when he returns home, he finds Laura there. She reveals she's given Whiting her gun to protect himself, which Escobar blackmailed her with. Ira and Laura then find Whiting murdered in his residence. Laura reveals the truth. Meanwhile, Charlie, Birdwell, and Lamar arrive at Margo's apartment and ask for the revolver, which Margo has in her possession. Ira phones Margo, concluding Birdwell had murdered Harry, and arrives at her apartment.

There, Ira deduces Laura killed Mrs. Whiting and then called Brian to move the body back to the Whiting house. The stamp robbery was intended to throw the police off the trail. Escobar had the gun, and Lamar killed him. Mr. Whiting wanted to go to the police so Laura killed him. Charlie then grabs the revolver and wants to force Birdwell to pay. However, a gunfight ensues, killing Birdwell and Lamar and wounding Charlie. Ira has the police called, but Charlie dies.

Following Charlie's funeral, Ira and Margo wait at a bus stop. Ira's landlady has asked him to leave, to which Ira decides to move in with Margo.

== Cast ==
- Art Carney as Ira Wells
- Lily Tomlin as Margo Sperling
- Bill Macy as Charlie Hatter
- Eugene Roche as Ronnie Birdwell
- Joanna Cassidy as Laura Birdwell
- John Considine as Lamar
- Ruth Nelson as Mrs. Schmidt
- John Davey as Sergeant Dayton
- Howard Duff as Harry Regan

== Production ==
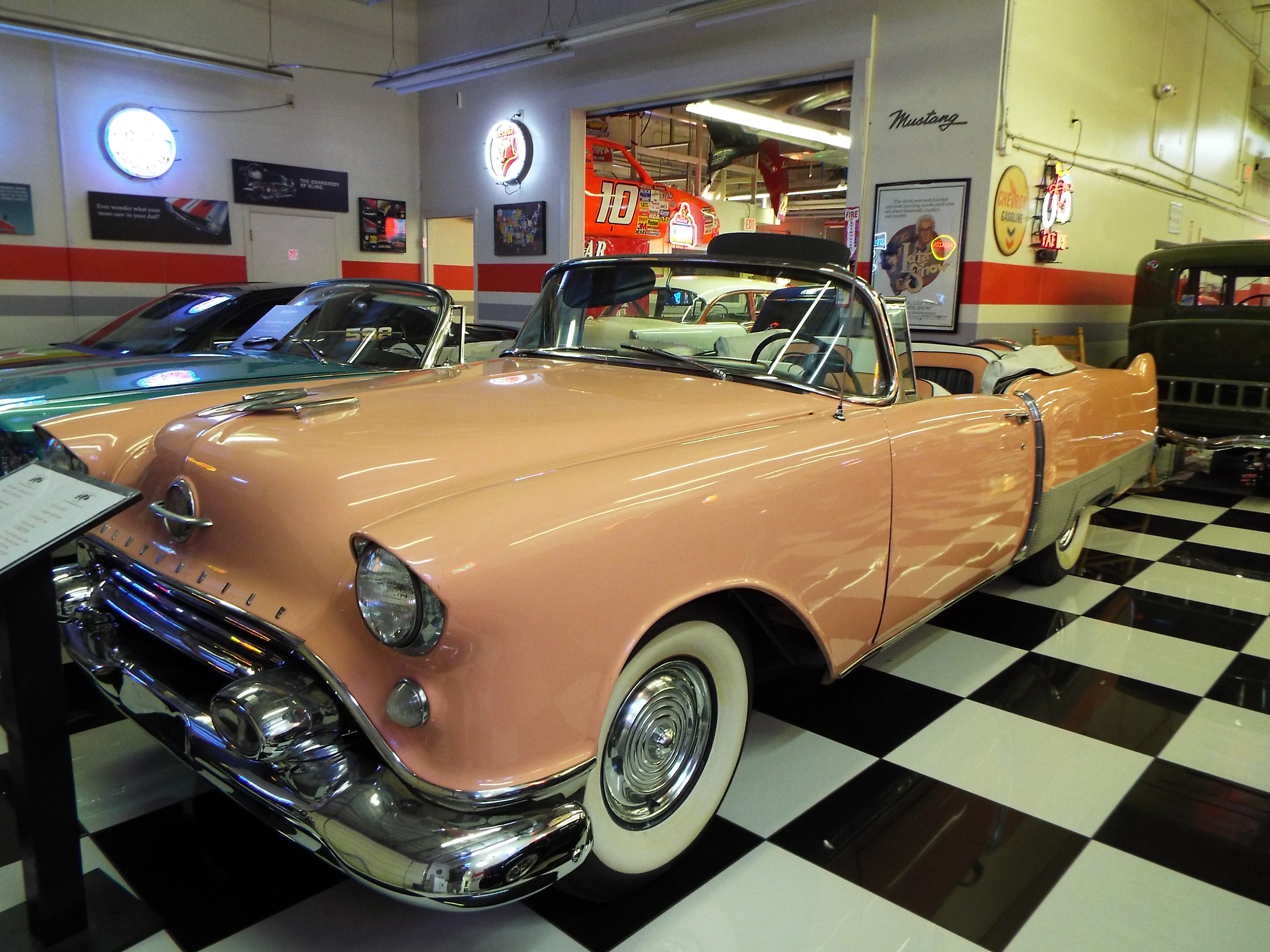
Custom built 1954 Oldsmobile-Cadillac for the film on display in the Martin Auto Museum

In early 1976, Robert Benton brought his script to Robert Altman, who, after reading it, decided to produce the film. While Benton had co-authored screenplays for several films, he was the sole author for The Late Show, which was also only the second film that Benton directed. Production began in spring of 1976 and wrapped in November. Lou Lombardo, who had a long relationship with Altman and edited several of Altman's films in the 1970s, edited along with Peter Appleton.

Ruth Nelson, playing the landlady Mrs. Schmidt, was a founder of the Group Theatre. It was her first film role since Arch of Triumph in 1948.

== Reception ==
=== Critical reception ===
Pauline Kael wrote: "The Late Show never lets up; the editing is by Lou Lombardo (who has often worked with Robert Altman) and Peter Appleton, and I can't think of a thriller from the forties that is as tight as this, or has such sustained tension...The Late Show is fast and exciting, but it isn't a thriller, exactly. It's a one-of-a-kind movie—a love-hate poem to sleaziness." Variety declared that Benton "has given Carney and Tomlin the freedom to create two extremely sympathetic characters. Both performances are knockout and should draw solid notices for this little-ballyhooed pic. Distrib Warner Bros. may just have a sleeper on its hands." Vincent Canby of The New York Times called the film "a funny, tightly constructed, knowledgeable, affectionate rave that all of us can share." Roger Ebert gave the film a four-star rating in his Chicago Sun-Times review: "And most of all, it's a movie that dares a lot, pulls off most of it, and entertains us without insulting our intelligence." Gene Siskel of the Chicago Tribune also gave the film four out of four stars, calling it "a marvelous comedy" and "an old-style film full of character, a genuine throwback to Hollywood's best efforts." He ranked the film second (behind only Annie Hall) on his year-end list of the best films of 1977.

Charles Champlin of the Los Angeles Times called the film "an artful and affectionate original, lively and enjoyable on its own self-sufficient terms, which catches the spirit and reflects the structure of the previous private eye pleasures." Gary Arnold of The Washington Post called it "a modestly conceived but surprisingly satisfying entertainment, a private-eye melodrama that looks and sounds up-to-date while respecting the traditions and conventions of the genre." Louise Sweet of The Monthly Film Bulletin was negative, calling the film a "wrongheaded attempt at nostalgic recreation" with Tomlin miscast in "a stereotyped role" and Benton directing at "a sluggish, almost geriatric pace."

An appreciation of the film was penned by Doug Krentzlin in 2014, who called the film "a unique, one-of-a-kind film that lived up to its advertising tagline 'The nicest, warmest, funniest, and most touching movie you'll ever see about blackmail, mystery, and murder.'"

The Late Show has a 95% rating at Rotten Tomatoes, based on 40 reviews. The consensus summarizes: "Deft direction from Robert Benton and a perfect pair in Art Carney and Lily Tomlin make The Late Show a solidly savory neo-noir treat."

=== Awards and nominations ===
The film received many award nominations, several for Benton's screenplay. Carney's performance won him the National Society of Film Critics Award for Best Actor. Tomlin's performance was nominated for the BAFTA Award and the Golden Globe Award, and she won the Silver Bear for Best Actress at the 27th Berlin International Film Festival. The film was nominated for the Golden Bear at the Berlin Film Festival. Benton's screenplay was nominated for the Writers Guild of America Award (Best Drama Written Directly for the Screen) and for the Academy Award for Best Original Screenplay. Benton won the award for Best Motion Picture Screenplay at the Edgar Awards.

== Television series ==
The film was the inspiration for the short-lived US television series Eye to Eye (1985).

== Home video ==
The Late Show was released as a zone 1 DVD in 2004. It previously had been released as a VHS tape.
