= The Search for Signs of Intelligent Life in the Universe =

1991 film by John Bailey

- Directed by: John Bailey
- Written by: Jane Wagner
- Produced by: Jane Wagner
- Starring: Lily Tomlin; Clay Walker
- Cinematography: John Bailey
- Edited by: Sally Menke
- Distributed by: Orion Classics
- Release date: September 27, 1991
- Running time: 120 minutes
- Country: United States
- Language: English

The Search for Signs of Intelligent Life in the Universe (1991) is a one-woman stage show written by Jane Wagner. The original Broadway production starred Lily Tomlin, won the Drama Desk Award for Unique Theatrical Experience, and was turned into a film in 1991.

The show, Tomlin's second Broadway billing as a solo performer, follows Tomlin as she performs various characters or personae, all while wearing simple black pants and a white blouse. The show appears disparate at first, but becomes unified under the sensibility of the opening "bag lady" persona as the performance progresses. The show is often praised or considered controversial for its feminist material, most notably the compressed history of the feminist movement offered in Act 2. For her stage performance, Tomlin won a Tony, Drama Desk, and Outer Critics' Circle awards.

A film version was directed by John Bailey and edited by Sally Menke, and stays true to the original stage performance. The film earned the Golden Space Needle Award at the Seattle International Film Festival. For her efforts on the film, Tomlin received a Funniest Actress in a Motion Picture American Comedy Awards, amongst other notable accolades. A restored version of the film, compiled from different prints, was shown at the 2024 RescueFest at the Laemmle Monica Film Center in Santa Monica, California in December 2024.

== Revival ==
In the fall of 2021, The Shed announced plans for a revival starring Saturday Night Live cast member Cecily Strong and directed by Tony nominee Leigh Silverman. It would run from January to February 2022. This production with Cecily Strong played at the Mark Taper Forum in Los Angeles from September 21 to October 23, 2022.
