= Performing Animal Welfare Society =

Private animal sanctuary in San Andreas, California, United States

- Abbreviation: PAWS
- Founder: Pat Derby and Ed Stewart
- Founded at: Galt, California
- Type: Nonprofit
- Purpose: Private animal sanctuary
- Location: San Andreas, California
- Website: pawsweb.org

The Performing Animal Welfare Society (PAWS) is a U.S.-based, nonprofit organization founded in 1984 that provides lifetime care for rescued or retired captive wild animals from circuses, zoos, and the exotic pet trade. PAWS operates the 2,300-acre ARK 2000 sanctuary in San Andreas, California, which provides large, naturalistic habitats for elephants, bears, big cats, nonhuman primates, small wild cats, and other animals.

PAWS is accredited by the Global Federation of Animal Sanctuaries (GFAS) and licensed by the U.S. Department of Agriculture and California Department of Fish and Wildlife. As a true sanctuary, PAWS does not buy, sell, trade, or breed animals, take them off-site for exhibition, or allow public contact with them.

== History ==
PAWS was founded by former Hollywood animal trainer and author Pat Derby and partner, Ed Stewart. During the 1970s, Derby worked in the entertainment industry on productions including "Flipper", "Daktari", "Gunsmoke", and "Lassie." At the time she met Stewart, Derby was training cougars Chauncey and Christopher for Lincoln Mercury's "Sign of the Cat" advertising campaign.

After witnessing the widespread neglect and abusive training practices in the animal entertainment industry, Derby became an outspoken advocate for captive wild animals. In 1976, she published a tell-all book, "The Lady and Her Tiger", a memoir and exposé describing the treatment of animals used in entertainment. Derby and Stewart subsequently began advocating for stronger animal welfare protections and an end to the commercial exploitation of wild animals in entertainment.

The first PAWS sanctuary opened in 1985 on 30 acres in Galt, California, where the organization cared for animals retired from the entertainment industry. In 1986, PAWS became the first sanctuary in the United States to provide long-term care for elephants after taking in an ill elephant calf known as "71."

In 1997, PAWS opened the Amanda Blake Memorial Wildlife Refuge, a 100-acre sanctuary in Herald, California, dedicated primarily to exotic hoofstock species. The refuge was named in honor of actress and animal advocate Amanda Blake, a longtime friend and supporter of the organization.

In 2002, PAWS opened the ARK 2000 sanctuary in San Andreas, California. The 2,300-acre facility became the organization's primary sanctuary for elephants, big cats, bears, and other rescued wildlife. The Galt and Herald sanctuaries were closed in 2023 and the remaining animals were transferred to ARK 2000.

Derby died on February 15, 2013, following a battle with cancer. Stewart continues to serve as president of the PAWS Board of Directors.

== Legislation and Advocacy ==
Since its founding, PAWS has participated in animal protection advocacy and legislation concerning captive wildlife. In 1984, PAWS partnered with California Assemblymember Sam Farr on AB 1620, legislation establishing statewide standards for the care and handling of captive wildlife. The bill was signed into law in 1985.

PAWS has also supported legislation prohibiting canned hunts in California, restricting the use of elephant bullhooks, ending the private possession of big cats and their use in cub petting encounters, and banning the use of wild animals in circuses and traveling shows in several jurisdictions. The organization advocates for reforms related to the private ownership, exhibition, and exploitation of wild animals in captivity.

== Mission ==
PAWS describes its mission as providing sanctuary for captive wild animals while promoting protection through advocacy, education, and legislation. The organization emphasizes naturalistic environments and lifelong care for animals who cannot be returned to the wild.

== See also ==
- Animal welfare
- Animal rights
- Animal protection
