= This Is a Recording (Lily Tomlin album) =

Live album by Lily Tomlin
- Released: March 1971
- Recorded: The Ice House; Pasadena, California
- Genre: Comedy
- Length: 46:51
- Label: Polydor

Lily Tomlin chronology
This Is a Recording (1971)	And That's the Truth (1972)

Professional ratings
Review scores
Source	Rating
AllMusic	4.5/5 stars

This Is a Recording is a comedy album released in 1971 by American actress-comedian Lily Tomlin. The album consists of comic sketches of Tomlin in her most famous character, Ernestine, the nosy, aggressive, and sharp-tongued telephone operator. The album's tracks include monologues in which Ernestine tangles over the phone with Joan Crawford, Gore Vidal ("Mr. Veedle"), Martha Mitchell, and J. Edgar Hoover. It was recorded live at the intimate Ice House in Pasadena, California.

The album, Tomlin's first, won her a Grammy Award for Best Comedy Recording. Tomlin became the first woman to win this award for a solo recording (in 1962 Elaine May won for an album with Mike Nichols; in the years since only Whoopi Goldberg, Kathy Griffin, and Tiffany Haddish among female comedians have won the award.) The album peaked at #15 on the Billboard Hot 200 albums list, the highest charting solo comedy album by a woman ever on the chart.

In 2024, the album was selected to the National Recording Registry by the Library of Congress as being "culturally, historically, and/or aesthetically significant".

== Track listing ==
1. "Alexander Graham Bell"
2. "Mr. Veedle"
3. "The Marriage Counselor"
4. "Joan Crawford"
5. "Obscene Phone Call"
6. "The Repairman"
7. "The Bordello"
8. "Strike"
9. "Peeved"
10. "Ernestine"
11. "The Pageant"
12. "The F.B.I."
13. "The Mafia and the Pope"
14. "Mrs. Mitchell"
15. "Awards Dinner"
16. "Boswick 9"
17. "I.B.M."

== Charts ==
=== Weekly charts ===
Chart (1971)	Peak position
US Billboard 200	15

=== Year-end charts ===
Chart (1971)	Position
US Billboard 200	81
