= Flirting with Disaster (film) =

1996 film by David O. Russell

- Theatrical release poster
- Directed by: David O. Russell
- Written by: David O. Russell
- Produced by: Dean Silvers
- Starring: Ben Stiller; Patricia Arquette; Téa Leoni; Alan Alda; Mary Tyler Moore; George Segal; Lily Tomlin; Richard Jenkins
- Cinematography: Eric Alan Edwards
- Edited by: Christopher Tellefsen
- Music by: Stephen Endelman
- Distributed by: Miramax Films
- Release date: March 22, 1996
- Running time: 93 minutes
- Country: United States
- Language: English
- Budget: $7 million
- Box office: $14.7 million

Flirting with Disaster is a 1996 American black comedy film written and directed by David O. Russell about a young father's search for his biological parents. It stars Ben Stiller, Patricia Arquette, Téa Leoni, Alan Alda, Mary Tyler Moore, George Segal, Lily Tomlin and Richard Jenkins. It was screened out of competition in the Special Screenings section at the 1996 Cannes Film Festival. The film became a critical and box office success.

== Plot ==
Mel Coplin and his wife, Nancy, live in New York, near Mel's neurotic, Jewish, adoptive parents, Ed and Pearl Coplin. Mel and Nancy have just had their first child, and Mel won't decide on a name for their son until he can discover the identity of his biological parents. When Tina Kelb, an adoption agency employee, locates his biological mother's name in a database, Mel decides to meet his mother personally.

The sexy but highly incompetent Tina decides to accompany Mel, Nancy, and the newborn on a trip to San Diego to meet Mel's biological mother. The trip does not go as planned, and ends up becoming a tour of the United States.

In San Diego, Mel is introduced to Valerie, a blonde Scandinavian woman with Confederate roots whose twin daughters are a head taller than Mel. They realize that Valerie is not Mel's biological mother, and Tina scrambles to get the correct information from the agency database. Meanwhile, Nancy becomes jealous as Tina and Mel begin to flirt.

The group heads to Battle Creek, Michigan, with the hope of meeting the man whose name appears as the person who delivered infant Mel to the adoption agency. The man, Fritz Boudreau, turns out to be a trucker with a violent streak. However, when he discovers that Mel might be his son, he becomes instantly friendly and lets Mel drive his semi-trailer truck, which Mel immediately crashes into a Post Office building.

This leads to a run-in with two ATF agents, Tony and Paul, who are in a relationship. It is discovered that Tony and Nancy went to high school together. Charges are dismissed, and Fritz tells Mel that he is not Mel's father, but only handled Mel's adoption because Mel's biological parents were indisposed. Tina locates the current address of Mel's biological parents, in rural New Mexico. Tony and Paul surprise everyone by deciding to tag along.

While Mel and Tina become close, Nancy finds herself flirting with Tony, who returns the compliment, causing friction. The trip through rural New Mexico is fraught with more problems. The whole crowd finally descends on the front porch of Mel's true biological parents, Richard and Mary Schlichting. They are asked to stay the night.

While Richard and Mary are more than welcoming, Mel's biological brother Lonnie is overly rude and jealous. It is during dinner that Mel discovers that Richard and Mary had to let Mel be adopted because they were in jail for making and distributing LSD in the late 1960s. Not only that, but Richard and Mary continue to manufacture the drug, as becomes apparent when Lonnie, in an attempt to dose Mel with acid at dinner, accidentally doses Paul. Mel retires to Tina's bedroom, while Nancy and Tony share a room; neither couple is truly comfortable, leading to Nancy and Mel spending the night reconciling their issues.

While the others are upstairs, the drugged Paul tries to arrest Richard and Mary, but Lonnie knocks him out with a frying pan. The three Schlichtings attempt to escape and decide to take Mel's car, hiding their supply of acid in the trunk. Ed and Pearl unexpectedly arrive, in their identical car, but then change their minds and decide to leave, taking the wrong car. When they change their minds again and make a blind U-turn on the nearly deserted highway, Mel's two sets of parents crash. Ed and Pearl are arrested while the Schlichtings escape to Mexico.

As morning arrives, not realizing what has happened, Mel and Nancy agree to name the baby Garcia, after Jerry Garcia. Called to the Sheriff's office to bail out Ed and Pearl, Mel refers to them as his parents, which they are surprised and happy to hear. Paul, Tony and Tina arrive, with Paul explaining the situation and getting Ed and Pearl released.

A montage of each family's personal relationships – Mel and Nancy, Paul and Tony and their Tina-arranged adopted baby, Ed and Pearl, the three Schlichtings, and a very pregnant Tina – continues over the credits. Each family still have their troubles, but Mel and Nancy are happy together.

== Cast ==
- Ben Stiller as Mel Coplin
- Patricia Arquette as Nancy Coplin, Mel's wife
- Téa Leoni as Tina Kalb, adoption agent
- Alan Alda as Richard Schlichting, Mel's biological father
- Mary Tyler Moore as Pearl Coplin, Mel's adoptive mother
- George Segal as Ed Coplin, Mel's adoptive father
- Lily Tomlin as Mary Schlichting, Mel's biological mother
- Glenn Fitzgerald as Lonnie Schlichting, Mel's biological brother
- Josh Brolin as Tony, ATF agent
- Richard Jenkins as Paul, ATF agent
- David Patrick Kelly as Fritz Boudreau, Mel's assumed biological father
- Celia Weston as Valerie Swaney
- Beth Stern as Jane (as Beth Ostrosky)
- Cynthia LaMontagne as Sandra (as Cynthia Lamontagne)

== Production ==
Burt Reynolds was up for a role in the film, but Russell decided not to work with him after hearing he was abusive on the set of The Larry Sanders Show.

== Reception ==
Rotten Tomatoes rated the film at 88% based on 56 reviews. The site's consensus states: "Darkly funny, solidly cast, and surprisingly thoughtful, Flirting with Disaster proved David O. Russell's Spanking the Monkey was no fluke." Metacritic, which uses a weighted average, assigned the film a score of 81 out of 100, based on 16 critics, indicating "universal acclaim". Audiences polled by CinemaScore gave the film an average grade of "B+" on an A+ to F scale. Roger Ebert gave it three and a half stars saying that it had "the sort of headlong confidence the genre requires. Russell finds the strong central line all screwball begins with, the seemingly serious mission or quest, and then throws darts at a map of the United States as he creates his characters."

== Home media ==
Flirting with Disaster was released on VHS by Miramax Home Entertainment on March 25, 1997. It received a U.S. LaserDisc release on May 21, 1997, with a Hong Kong LaserDisc also being released at an undetermined date. The film later became available on DVD in the U.S. on April 3, 2001. A Collector's Edition DVD, featuring additional content such as deleted scenes and a making-of featurette, was released on June 1, 2004.

In 2010, Miramax was sold by The Walt Disney Company (their owners since 1993), with the studio being taken over by private equity firm Filmyard Holdings that same year. Filmyard sublicensed the home media rights for several Miramax titles to Lionsgate, and on July 2, 2012, Lionsgate Home Entertainment reissued the film on DVD Additionally, Filmyard Holdings licensed the Miramax library to streamer Netflix in 2011. This deal included Flirting with Disaster, and ran for five years, eventually ending on June 1, 2016.

Filmyard Holdings sold Miramax to Qatari company beIN Media Group during March 2016. In April 2020, ViacomCBS (now known as Paramount Skydance) acquired the rights to Miramax's library, after buying a 49% stake in the studio from beIN. Flirting with Disaster was one of the 700 titles Paramount acquired in the deal. Paramount Home Entertainment reissued the film on DVD on February 23, 2021, with this being one of many Miramax titles that they reissued around this time. It was also made available on Paramount's free streaming service Pluto TV.

== Soundtrack ==
A soundtrack album was released on Geffen Records that includes the following tracks:

1. "Anything But Love" (Dr. John and Angela McCluskey)
2. "Somebody Else's Body" (Urge Overkill)
3. "Outasight" (G. Love and The Philly Cartel)
4. "You're Not a Slut" (Ben Stiller And Celia Weston)
5. "Camel Walk" (Southern Culture on the Skids)
6. Lend Me Your Comb" (Carl Perkins)
7. "Acid Propaganda" (Lily Tomlin / Alan Alda / Ben Stiller)
8. "You Part the Waters" (Cake)
9. "Lonnie Cooks Quail" (Glen Fitzgerald)
10. "Red Beans N' Reverb" (Southern Culture on the Skids)
11. "Flirting with Disaster" (Dr. John and Angela McCluskey)
12. "Hypospadia" (Patricia Arquette / Josh Brolin / Tea Leoni / Ben Stiller)
13. "Melodie D'Amour (Cha, Cha, Cha D'Amour)" (Dean Martin)
14. "For Duty and Humanity" (Inch)
15. "The Flirting Suit" (Stephen Endelman)
