= Big Business (1988 film) =

1988 film directed by Jim Abrahams

- Theatrical release poster
- Directed by: Jim Abrahams
- Written by: Dori Pierson; Marc Reid Rubel
- Produced by: Steve Tisch; Michael Peyser
- Starring: Bette Midler; Lily Tomlin
- Cinematography: Dean Cundey
- Edited by: Harry Keramidas
- Music by: Lee Holdridge
- Production companies: Touchstone Pictures; Silver Screen Partners III
- Distributed by: Buena Vista Pictures Distribution
- Release date: June 10, 1988
- Running time: 98 minutes
- Country: United States
- Language: English
- Budget: $20 million
- Box office: $40.2 million

Big Business is a 1988 American comedy film starring Bette Midler and Lily Tomlin, each playing two roles, as sets of identical twins mismatched at birth. The nature versus nurture farce adapts The Comedy of Errors, but with female siblings in contemporary society: one of each twin being reared in a wealthy urban setting, while the others grew up in a poor rural environment.

Produced by Touchstone Pictures, the film co-stars Fred Ward, Edward Herrmann, Joe Grifasi, and Seth Green, as well as siblings Michael Gross and Mary Gross. Directed by Jim Abrahams, critical reaction to the film as a whole was generally lukewarm. Both Midler and Tomlin were nominated for the American Comedy Award for Funniest Actress in a Motion Picture for their performances with Midler winning.

== Plot ==
In 1948, wealthy businessman Hunt Shelton and his pregnant wife are lost in rural West Virginia when Mrs. Shelton goes into labor near the town of Jupiter Hollow. At the local hospital, they are turned away, because it is exclusively for employees of Hollowmade, the local furniture maker. Mr. Shelton purchases the company on the spot, and Mrs. Shelton is then admitted. The Ratliffs, an impoverished couple, arrive moments later with Mrs. Ratliff also in labor. Both women give birth to twin girls, and the elderly nurse attending the doctor confuses and mixes up the sets of twins. Mr. Ratliff overhears the Sheltons deciding to name their daughters Rose and Sadie, and suggests the same names to his wife.

Forty years later, the Shelton sisters are now co-chairwomen of Moramax in New York City, a conglomerate that is the successor to their father's business interests. Sadie Shelton is ruthless and focused on her career to the detriment of her family, while Rose Shelton is less business-savvy and out of touch with the needs of the company, wishing instead for a simpler life in the country. As part of her business plan, Sadie plans to sell Hollowmade but must get the Moramax stockholders' approval to proceed. Knowing that the board (which includes Rose) is sensitive to potential bad publicity harming the company's already diminished public image, Sadie assures them that the residents of Jupiter Hollow are completely on board with the sale and that operations at the factory will continue as normal. In Jupiter Hollow, Rose Ratliff has risen to the position of forewoman at the Hollowmade Factory and is also very career-driven. Meanwhile, Sadie Ratliff has always felt misplaced in rural life, and wishes for a more sophisticated life in a big city. Rose discovers Moramax's plans to sell Hollowmade and sensing trouble, makes plans to travel to New York City to stop the sale. Wanting to see the city, Sadie agrees to join her sister.

While Sadie Shelton makes plans for the shareholders' meeting, she learns from her employee Graham Sherbourne that an "R. Ratliff" plans to come to New York with his sister to stop the sale. Sadie orders Sherbourne to locate "R. Ratliff" to prevent them from appearing at the meeting. A series of mixups at JFK Airport leaves the Shelton sisters stranded while the prospective buyer of Hollowmade, Fabio Alberici, takes their limousine with the Ratliff sisters back to the Plaza Hotel, where the shareholders' meeting is set to take place the next day. The Ratliffs are checked into the Sheltons' suite, which Rose Ratliff assumes is a bribe from Moramax but begrudgingly accepts. The Sheltons eventually arrive at the hotel and take the suite next door, leading to a series of near-misses between the four sisters.

As the day unfolds, Sadie Shelton meets Alberici and becomes enamored with him as they flirtatiously discuss the upcoming sale. While out exploring the city, Sadie Ratliff is approached by Sadie Shelton's ex-husband Michael, and their spoiled and unruly son Jason, both assuming they are speaking to her Shelton counterpart. Sadie Ratliff calls out Jason for his behavior, which greatly impresses Michael. He later approaches her at the Plaza and asks her out, which she accepts. In the meantime, Graham and his assistant/boyfriend Chuck assume that a visitor from Jupiter Hollow, Rose Ratliff's beau Roone Dimmick, is actually "R. Ratliff". Worried that he will disrupt the sale, the two men attempt to keep Roone distracted while enlisting the help of Rose Shelton. Roone, believing that Rose Shelton is Rose Ratliff, attempts to woo her, with great success. Meanwhile, Rose Shelton's ex-boyfriend, Dr. Jay Marshall, attempts to propose to her, unaware that he is in fact speaking to Rose Ratliff. Assuming by mistake that he is a Moramax employee sent to buy her silence about the sale, she harshly rebuffs him. As the night ends, Alberici, believing that he is speaking to Sadie Shelton, inadvertently gives Sadie Ratliff a copy of the Hollowmade sale plan, wherein it is revealed that he has no intentions of continuing operations at the factory, opting instead to shut it down and strip-mine Jupiter Hollow so that he can use the land for other purposes, all done with Sadie Shelton's full knowledge and approval.

All sisters eventually discover the mix-up the next day when they run into each other in the lobby bathroom. After Sadie Shelton feigns that she will call off the Hollowmade sale, Rose Ratliff calls her out on the plans to strip-mine Jupiter Hollow. Rose Shelton realizes that her sister has been lying to her, and she helps Rose Ratliff to subdue Sadie Shelton. Sadie Shelton tries to convince Sadie Ratliff to help her by promising her a life of luxury and glamour. While conflicted at first, Sadie Ratliff ultimately sides with the two Roses and the three women trap Sadie Shelton in a nearby broom closet. At first, Rose Ratliff plans to go into the stockholders' meeting to demand they say no to the sale of Hollowmade, but Rose Shelton warns that they won't believe her as Sadie Shelton is the one who always does the speaking. Rose Ratliff sits outside the broom closet to keep Sadie Shelton trapped, while Rose Shelton and Sadie Ratliff attend the shareholders' meeting. Though Sadie Ratliff is initially awkward, Rose Shelton takes over, and the two are ultimately successful in stopping the sale by appealing to the stakeholders' self-preservation, telling them that the sale will bring immense negative publicity. Both sets of twins later leave the Plaza Hotel with their newfound loves.

== Cast ==
- Bette Midler as
  - Sadie Shelton
  - Sadie Ratliff
- Lily Tomlin as
  - Rose Ratliff
  - Rose Shelton
- Fred Ward as Roone Dimmick
- Edward Herrmann as Graham Sherbourne
- Michele Placido as Fabio Alberici
- Daniel Gerroll as Chuck
- Barry Primus as Michael
- Michael Gross as Dr. Jay Marshall
- Deborah Rush as "Binky" Shelton
- Nicolas Coster as Hunt Shelton
- Patricia Gaul as Iona Ratliff
- J. C. Quinn as Garth Ratliff
- Norma MacMillan as Nanny Lewis
- Joe Grifasi as the desk clerk
- John Vickery as the hotel manager
- John Hancock as Older Harlan
- Mary Gross as Judy
- Seth Green as Jason
- Leo Burmester as Bum
- Lucy Webb as Wenona
- Roy Brocksmith as Dr. Parker
- Carmen Argenziano as a board member (uncredited)
- Chick Hearn as himself (uncredited)
- Shirley Mitchell as a stockholder (uncredited)

== Production ==
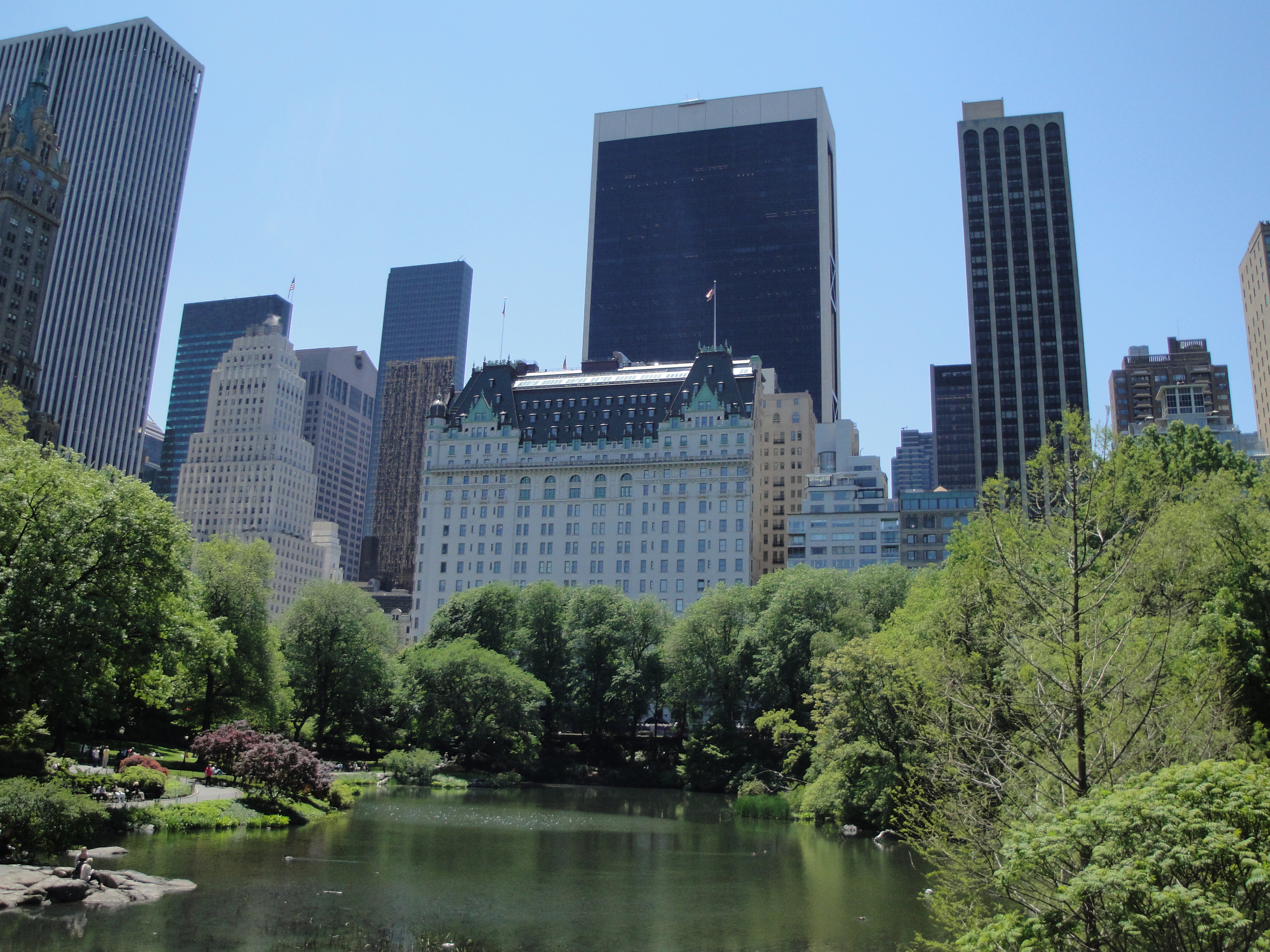
The Plaza and its International Modern style neighbors as seen in the film

The movie was originally written for Barbra Streisand (Midler's role) and Goldie Hawn (Tomlin's role). The plot playfully combines three recognizable stories: Aesop's The Town Mouse and the Country Mouse, Mark Twain's The Prince and the Pauper, and Shakespeare's The Comedy of Errors.

The production company could not get permission to film at the Plaza Hotel in New York City, so it had the hotel replicated on a Walt Disney Studios sound stage. To recoup construction costs, Disney built a sitcom titled The Nutt House around it. Jim Abrahams said he staged one of the boardroom scenes based on an experience he had when a large agency used many employees to get him to sign with them.

== Reception ==
Critical reaction to the film as a whole was generally lukewarm. Rotten Tomatoes reports that 52% of critics gave the film a positive rating, based on 23 reviews, with an average score of 5/10. Sheila Benson from the Los Angeles Times called Big Business a "bright whirligig of a movie" and added: "As you watch its buoyant hilarity, the intricacies flow smoothly as honey off a spoon [...] Like a sensational party the night before, Big Business may not bear the closest scrutiny in the cold light of day, but it gives an irresistible glow at the time. And when it gets on a roll, it's a movie with more wit to its lines and a more pungent array of them than much of the mishmash that has passed as Bette Midler's Greatest Movie Hits." Philadelphia Daily News writer Ben Yagoda felt that the film was "big fun. Lily Tomlin and Bette Midler are a double dose of hilarity. Call out the National Guard — Big Business is a laugh riot".

In his review for The New York Times, Vincent Canby remarked that Big Business, "though it never quite delivers the boffo payoff, is a most cheerful, very breezy summer farce, played to the hilt by two splendidly comic performers...Sometimes [the film's writers] do have trouble in characterizing the two sets of twins, allowing them to blend in such a way that the comic edge finally becomes blurred. Yet the film moves at such a clip, and with such uncommon zest, that it's good fun even when the invention wears thin." Roger Ebert, writing for the Chicago Sun-Times, gave the film two out of four stars. He declared the film "an endless and dreary series of scenes in which the various twins just barely miss running into each other in the Plaza Hotel," and found that it felt "unfinished" and missed a payoff. Variety called the film "a shrill, unattractive comedy." The staff felt that Midler's "loud brashness generally dominated [Tomlin's] sly skittishness".

John Simon of the National Review called Big Business a "dreadful film".

== Box office ==
In the United States, Big Business debuted within the top three on the box-office chart and became a modest success, eventually grossing $40.2 million during its domestic run.

== Home media ==
The film was released to VHS, Betamax, and Laserdisc in 1989 by Touchstone Home Video, with a DVD release in 2002. In 2011, Big Business was among a selection of titles from Touchstone and Hollywood Pictures to be licensed to Mill Creek Entertainment on behalf of Disney, and a DVD and Blu-ray disc were released of the film. The DVD is available on its own, as a double-feature with Straight Talk, and as a triple-feature with Straight Talk and V.I. Warshawski.

In December 2017, Big Business and Scenes from a Mall were re-released on DVD and Blu-ray by Kino Lorber under license from Walt Disney Studios Home Entertainment.

In 2026 Big Business became available to stream on Disney in Australia. As of September 2026 it is still available to stream on Disney in Australia.
