= Jane Wagner =

American writer, director and producer (born 1935)

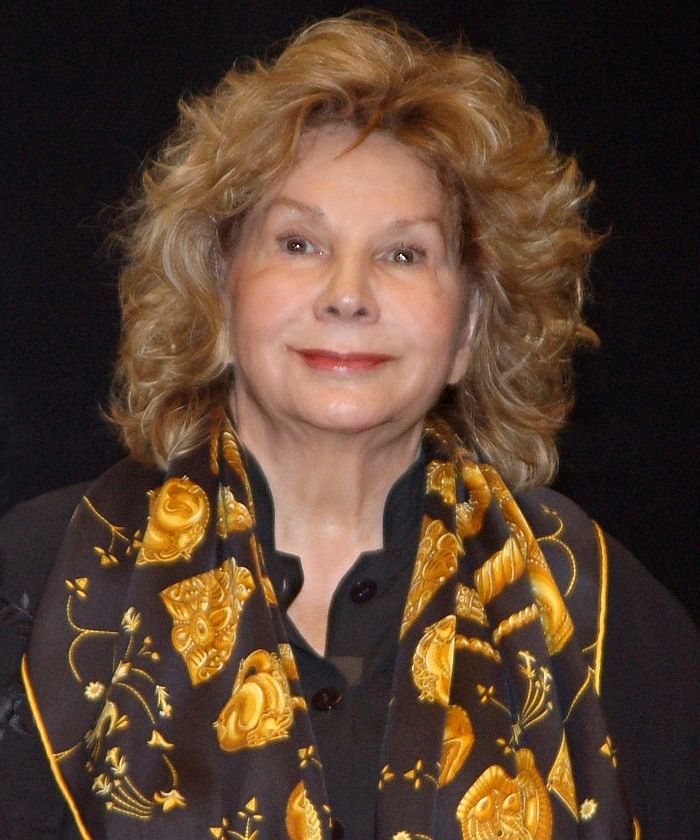
- Wagner in 2011
- Born: February 26, 1935 (age 91); Morristown, Tennessee, U.S.
- Occupations: Screenwriter, director, producer
- Spouse: Lily Tomlin (m. 2013)
- Awards: Primetime Emmy Award for Outstanding Writing for a Variety Special; 1974 Lily

Jane Wagner (born February 26, 1935) is an American writer, director and producer. She is known for her creative collaborations with her wife Lily Tomlin.

== Early life and education ==
Wagner was born and raised in Morristown, Tennessee, where she developed an interest in writing. She attended Morristown High School, where she wrote for the school newspaper. At 17, she moved from East Tennessee to New York City, where she studied painting and sculpture at the School of Visual Arts and pursued an acting career.

== Career ==
Early in her life, she toured with the Barter Theatre of Abingdon, Virginia, and later became a designer for such firms as Kimberly-Clark and Fieldcrest.

Wagner made her writing debut with the CBS afternoon special J.T. (1969), for which she won the Peabody Award — and drew the attention of Tomlin, who was looking for someone to help develop the Laugh-In character Edith Ann. It was the beginning of a collaboration that continues to this day. In 1977, she and Tomlin co-wrote and co-directed Tomlin's Broadway debut, the one-woman show "Appearing Nitely."

Wagner has been nominated for Grammy Awards, with Tomlin, for the comic's recorded albums and has won three Emmy Awards and a Writers Guild of America award, also with Tomlin, for the comic's television specials.

Wagner wrote and directed Moment by Moment, starring Tomlin and John Travolta, and wrote The Incredible Shrinking Woman, which starred Tomlin.

The Search for Signs of Intelligent Life in the Universe won Wagner a Special Award from the New York Drama Critics' Circle and a New York Drama Desk Award. The film adaptation of the play brought Wagner a Cable ACE Award.

Wagner won a second Peabody for the ABC special, Edith Ann's Christmas: Just Say Noel (1996).

== Honors, awards and nominations ==
Annie Award
1997: nominated – Best Individual Achievement: Writing in a TV Production – Edith Ann's Christmas: Just Say Noel

Drama Desk Award
2001: nominated – Outstanding Revival of a Play – The Search for Signs of Intelligent Life in the Universe
1986: won – Unique Theatrical Experience – The Search for Signs of Intelligent Life in the Universe

Emmy Award
1993: nominated – Outstanding Variety, Music or Comedy Special – The Search for Signs of Intelligent Life in the Universe
1981: won – Outstanding Variety, Music or Comedy Program – Lily: Sold Out
1981: nominated – Outstanding Writing in a Variety, Music or Comedy Program – Lily: Sold Out
1976: won – Outstanding Writing in a Comedy-Variety or Music Special – The Lily Tomlin Special
1976: nominated – Outstanding Comedy-Variety or Music Special – The Lily Tomlin Special
1974: won – Outstanding Writing in Comedy-Variety, Variety or Music – Lily

Peabody Award
1996: won – Edith Ann's Christmas: Just Say Noel
1970: won – J.T.

Tony Award
2001: nominated – Best Revival of a Play – The Search for Signs of Intelligent Life in the Universe

Lambda Literary Award

2020: won – Lambda Literary Visionary prize

== Personal life ==
Wagner met her future wife, actress Lily Tomlin, in March 1971. After watching the after-school TV special J.T. written by Wagner, Tomlin invited Wagner to Los Angeles to collaborate on Tomlin's comedy LP album And That's The Truth. On December 31, 2013, Wagner and Tomlin married in a private ceremony in Los Angeles after 42 years together.

== Works and publications ==
- Wagner, Jane, and Gordon Parks, Jr. J.T. New York: Dell, 1971. ISBN 978-0-440-44275-2 OCLC 25466332
- Tomlin, Lily, and Jane Wagner. On Stage. New York, N.Y.: Arista, 1977. Recorded live at the Biltmore Theatre, New York City. Audio book on LP. OCLC 858894156
- Wagner, Jane. Development and Effect of Feminist Consciousness Raising Women's Groups, Los Angeles, Late 1960s Through 1982. Ph.D. Thesis/dissertation. Wright Institute, Los Angeles. 1983. OCLC 18254930
- Wagner, Jane, Elon Soltes, Wendy Apple, and Lily Tomlin. Appearing Nitely. Valley Village, Calif.: Tomlin and Wagner Theatricalz, 1992. Recorded live at the Huntington Hartford Theater in Los Angeles, Calif. Originally produced for television in 1978. Video recording. OCLC 28219227
- Wagner, Jane. Edith Ann – My Life, So Far. New York: Hyperion, 1994. As told to and illustrated by Jane Wagner. ISBN 978-0-786-86120-0 OCLC 31236871
- Tomlin, Lily, Jane Wagner, and Anna Deavere Smith. Conversation with Lily Tomlin and Jane Wagner, October 25, 1994. San Francisco: City Arts & Lectures, Inc, 1994. Masonic Auditorium. OCLC 743427376
- Wagner, Jane. J.T. New York: Carousel Films, 2000. DVD. Originally broadcast in 1969. Jeannette Du Bois, Theresa Merritt, Kevin Hooks. OCLC 63681705
- Tomlin, Lily, and Jane Wagner. And That's the Truth. United States: Universal Music Enterprises, 2003. Recorded live at The Ice House, Pasadena, March 1976. Audio book. OCLC 212930925
- Tomlin, Lily, and Jane Wagner. The Search for Signs of Intelligent Life in the Universe. Tarzana, Calif.: Laugh.com, 2005. 1992 HBO television film. A film adaptation of the Broadway play by Jane Wagner. OCLC 63664207
- Wagner, Jane, Marilyn French, and Lily Tomlin. The Search for Signs of Intelligent Life in the Universe. New York, NY: ItBooks, an imprint of HarperCollinsPublishers, 2012. Reprint. Originally published: New York : Harper & Row, 1986. Based on the Broadway play written by Wagner starring Lily Tomlin. Includes an Afterword by Marilyn French and Reflections by Lily Tomlin and by Jane Wagner. ISBN 978-0-062-10737-4 OCLC 798732509
