= List of The West Wing characters =

The television series The West Wing is a political drama series which was originally broadcast on NBC.

During its seven seasons the ensemble cast of stars, recurring stars, and guest stars earned 157 acting nominations (often competing in the same category against other members of the cast) across a variety of award-granting organizations, earning 30 awards. Many actors noted for work in sitcoms appeared in dramatic roles on The West Wing, including John Goodman, Alan Alda, John Larroquette, Christopher Lloyd, Ed O'Neill, Matthew Perry, Patricia Richardson, Lily Tomlin, Wayne Wilderson, and Daniel von Bargen.

== Main cast ==
= Main cast (credited)
= Recurring cast (2+)

| Character | Portrayed by | Seasons | | | | | | | Reunion Special |
| Character | Portrayed by | 1 | 2 | 3 | 4 | 5 | 6 | 7 | Reunion Special |
|---|---|---|---|---|---|---|---|---|---|
| Sam Seaborn | Rob Lowe | Main | Main | Main | Main | | | R | Main |
| Mandy Hampton | Moira Kelly | Main | | | | | | | |
| C. J. Cregg | Allison Janney | Main | Main | Main | Main | Main | Main | Main | Main |
| Toby Ziegler | Richard Schiff | Main | Main | Main | Main | Main | Main | Main | Main |
| Leo McGarry | John Spencer | Main | Main | Main | Main | Main | Main | Main | |
| Leo McGarry | Sterling K. Brown | | | | | | | | Main |
| Josh Lyman | Bradley Whitford | Main | Main | Main | Main | Main | Main | Main | Main |
| Josiah Bartlet | Martin Sheen | Main | Main | Main | Main | Main | Main | Main | Main |
| Charlie Young | Dulé Hill | Main | Main | Main | Main | Main | Main | Main | Main |
| Donna Moss | Janel Moloney | R | Main | Main | Main | Main | Main | Main | Main |
| Abbey Bartlet | Stockard Channing | Recurring | Recurring | Main | Main | Main | Main | Main | |
| Will Bailey | Joshua Malina | | | | Main | Main | Main | Main | |
| Kate Harper | Mary McCormack | | | | | R | Main | Main | |
| Matt Santos | Jimmy Smits | | | | | | Main | Main | |
| Arnold Vinick | Alan Alda | | | | | | Main | Main | |
| Annabeth Schott | Kristin Chenoweth | | | | | | R | Main | |

== White House staff ==
White House Staff
| Character | Actor | Titles |
|---|---|---|
| Josiah "Jed" Bartlet | Martin Sheen | President of the United States (season 1–7); Former Governor of New Hampshire; Former U. S. Representative from New Hampshire; Nobel laureate in Economics |
| Joshua "Josh" Lyman | Bradley Whitford | White House Deputy Chief of Staff (season 1–6); Campaign Manager for Santos–McGarry Campaign (Seasons 6–7); White House Chief of Staff (season 7) |
| Leo Thomas McGarry | John Spencer | White House Chief of Staff (Seasons 1–6); Special Counselor to the President (season 6); Democratic vice-presidential nominee (season 6–7); Vice President–elect of the United States (season 7); Former Secretary of Labor; Vietnam War veteran |
| Claudia Jean "C.J." Cregg | Allison Janney | White House Press Secretary (Seasons 1–6); White House Chief of Staff (Seasons 6–7) |
| Charles "Charlie" Young | Dulé Hill | Personal Aide to the President (Seasons 1–6); Deputy Special Assistant to the Chief of Staff (Seasons 6–7) |
| Donnatella "Donna" Moss | Janel Moloney | Senior Assistant to White House Deputy Chief of Staff (Seasons 1–6); Media Specialist and Campaign Spokesperson for Bob Russell (season 6); Deputy Press Secretary for Santos–McGarry Campaign (season 7); Chief of Staff to the First Lady (season 7) |
| Tobias Zachary "Toby" Ziegler | Richard Schiff | White House Communications Director (Seasons 1–7) |
| Samuel Norman "Sam" Seaborn | Rob Lowe | White House Deputy Communications Director (Seasons 1–4); Candidate for California 47th congressional district (season 4); White House Deputy Chief of Staff (season 7) |
| William "Will" Bailey | Joshua Malina | White House Deputy Communications Director (Seasons 4–5); Chief of Staff to Vice-president Bob Russell (Seasons 5–7); White House Communications Director (season 7); Congressman from the Oregon 4th congressional district (season 7) |
| Annabeth Schott | Kristin Chenoweth | Deputy Press Secretary for Media Relations (season 6); Campaign Staffer for Santos–McGarry Campaign (season 7); Press Secretary to the First Lady (season 7) |

- Madeline "Mandy" Hampton (Moira Kelly): Political consultant during Bartlet's first campaign. Worked as a media consultant at Lennox-Chase after the campaign. Briefly consults for Democratic Senator Lloyd Russell before being hired by the White House as a political consultant and media director (season 1). She is not seen or mentioned again after the first season.
- Amelia "Amy" Gardner (Mary-Louise Parker): Head of the Women's Leadership Coalition and influential women's rights activist. Works as a political consultant for Senator Howard Stackhouse when he runs for president. Later hired as the Chief of Staff for the Office of the First Lady. Resigns after she upsets the President (Seasons 3–5). Agrees to become the Director of Legislative Affairs in the Santos administration (season 7).
- Clifford "Cliff" Calley (Mark Feuerstein): Majority Counsel for the House Government Reform and Oversight Committee during the Bartlet censure proceedings (season 3) and a Republican. During the censure hearings, he helps facilitate a schedule delay which allows Leo McGarry to avoid potentially damaging testimony. Briefly hired as Deputy Chief of Staff by C.J. Cregg (season 6), where he helps orchestrate a Democratic vote on stem cell research that the Republican Speaker of the House has stymied.
- Angela Blake (Michael Hyatt): Worked for Leo McGarry while he was Secretary of Labor. While a political consultant, she is hired to be Director of Legislative Affairs (season 5), fulfilling Josh Lyman's duties while he is benched for causing a Democratic Senator to defect. She is not seen or mentioned again after the budget crisis is over and Josh regains his effective leadership.

=== Other White House staffers ===
- Dolores Landingham (Kathryn Joosten and Kirsten Nelson in flashback in "Two Cathedrals"): The President's first executive secretary (season 1–2) and a close confidante dating back to his high school days. Her death in a car accident at the end of season two (episode "18th and Potomac") briefly shakes Bartlet's faith. Appears in flashbacks (Seasons 3–4). Referred to simply as "Mrs Landingham" almost always by everyone, including the president.
- Deborah "Debbie" Fiderer (Lily Tomlin): The President's second and final executive secretary, hired after the death of Mrs Landingham (Seasons 4–7). Charlie arranges her first interview with the President against her own wishes, in which she is groggy from prescription medication and performs badly by confessing to being both a professional gambler and an alpaca farmer. Charlie later successfully pushes for her to be re-considered. President Bartlet learns the reason she lost her previous White House personnel job — she had defied the Director of Personnel by hiring Charlie rather than a wealthy Bartlet supporter's unqualified son — and, though appearing very quirky, he sees she is actually very smart and capable, he hires her on the spot.
- Margaret Hooper (NiCole Robinson): Assistant to chiefs of staff Leo McGarry (Seasons 1–6) and C. J. Cregg (Seasons 6–7). She is somewhat eccentric and often focused on the minutiae of life. Particularly devoted to and protective of Leo — frequently found snooping in on his private meetings — but she has a rebellious streak, so they are often at odds with their working styles. She is visibly pregnant in season 6, with no clear information about the father, and her baby is never seen on the show. After Leo is fired from his position by the President, she is convinced to stay on as C.J.'s assistant.
- Bonnie (Devika Parikh): Assistant to Communications Director Toby Ziegler (Seasons 1–5).
- Carol Fitzpatrick (Melissa Fitzgerald): Assistant to Press Secretaries C. J. Cregg and Toby Ziegler (Seasons 1–7).
- Ginger (Kim Webster): Assistant to Communications Director Toby Ziegler and Deputy Communications Director Sam Seaborn (Seasons 1–7).
- Cathy (Suzy Nakamura): Assistant to Deputy Communications Director Sam Seaborn (season 1).
- Elsie Snuffin (Danica McKellar): Assistant to Deputy Communications Director Will Bailey, as well as his stepsister (season 4).
- Cassie Tatum (Claire Coffee): Intern at the White House Press Office (season 4).
- Lauren Romano (Lara Phillips): Intern at the White House Press Office (season 4). Will Bailey often calls her by her last name to tell the Laurens apart (but still gets it wrong).
- Lauren Shelby (Kimberlee Peterson): Intern at the White House Press Office (season 4). Will Bailey often calls her by her last name to tell the Laurens apart (but still gets it wrong).
- Lauren Chin (Catherine Kwong): Intern at the White House Press Office (season 4). Will Bailey often calls her by her last name to tell the Laurens apart (but still gets it wrong).
- Marina ("Rina") (Melissa Marsala): Assistant to Communications Director Toby Ziegler (season 5). Causes consternation among staff members by wearing revealing outfits in the West Wing office areas, raising concerns over potential harassment complaints or perceived lack of professionalism. After an emotional moment in which she admits no one likes her, Toby takes pity and recruits her as his assistant, which she proves to be adept at.
- Nancy (Renée Estevez): President's Confidential Assistant (Seasons 1–7). Estevez is the real-life daughter of Martin Sheen.
- Ed (Peter James Smith): White House staffer usually seen with Larry.
- Larry (William Duffy): White House staffer usually seen with Ed.
- Ryan Pierce (Jesse Bradford): White House intern assigned to Josh and nephew of a powerful senator; great-great-great-grandson of the 14th U.S. president, Franklin Pierce (Season 5). Toward the end of that season, he becomes a top aide to a Democratic congressman whom Josh dislikes, and is not seen or mentioned after that.
- Curtis Carruthers (Ben Murray): Succeeds Charlie Young as personal aide to the President (season 6).

=== Office of the White House Counsel ===
- Lionel Tribbey (John Larroquette): The fourth White House Counsel of the Bartlet administration and the first to appear in the series (albeit only once, in season 2). He has very liberal views and is animated and theatrical.
- Oliver Babish (Oliver Platt): The fifth and final White House Counsel of the Bartlet administration and the second of the two characters to be shown in that position during the series (Season 3 and 7). Diligent and zealous, he first appears in season three advising President Bartlet on disclosing his multiple sclerosis to the public. He returns in season seven to participate in the White House's internal investigation into the military shuttle leak. After Toby Ziegler confesses, Babish interrogates and recommends he be fired; in private, however, he expresses sympathy and thanks Toby for his service. He decamps to a law firm in the wake of the outgoing Bartlet Administration and is mentioned by Santos as a potential choice for Attorney General. He is described by Josh Lyman as "smart and tough".
- Ainsley Hayes (Emily Procter): Associate (and proposed Deputy) White House Counsel (Seasons 2–3). Conservative Republican from North Carolina. Graduate of Harvard Law School, she is notable for her rapid-fire speech patterns and love of Gilbert and Sullivan musicals. After she soundly defeats and embarrasses Sam in a debate on the political talk show Capital Beat, President Bartlet tells Leo McGarry to offer her a job as Associate White House Counsel. Initially believing the offer is either a joke or a terrible idea, she declines, but reconsiders upon seeing the White House staff in action during a crisis. Primarily, she serves as a foil to Sam Seaborn, making him reconsider his position on policies. She briefly reappears in season 7, wanting to become White House Counsel for the Santos Administration with Josh planning on getting her a meeting with Santos.
- Joe Quincy (Matthew Perry): Associate White House Counsel who replaces Ainsley Hayes (Seasons 4–5). Republican. He uncovers Vice President Hoynes's leaking of information during an affair with local socialite Helen Baldwin, ultimately leading to Hoynes's resignation. He is later asked by Toby to try and convince Supreme Court Chief Justice Roy Ashland, whom he once clerked for, to retire, a task he performs very reluctantly upon seeing his cognitive decline.
- Mike Wayne (Benjamin Brown): Associate White House Counsel (seasons 4–7). Deals with Toby after he admits to being the source of the military space shuttle leak.
- Richard Squire (Michael Kostroff): Associate White House Counsel (season 6). Graduate of Yale Law School and a Rhodes Scholar.

=== Situation Room ===
- Admiral Percy "Fitz" Fitzwallace (John Amos): Chairman of the Joint Chiefs of Staff (Seasons 1–5). Fitzwallace is a career surface warfare officer. Following his retirement, while he is on a special diplomatic mission in Palestine at Bartlet's particular request, he is killed in a terrorist road-side bombing of his car, in which Donna Moss is also badly injured, at the culmination of the fifth season.
- General Nicholas Alexander (Terry O'Quinn): an ex-Green Beret. He succeeds Admiral Fitzwallace as a much more hawkish Chairman of the Joint Chiefs of Staff (Seasons 5–6).
- Dr. Nancy McNally (Anna Deavere Smith): National Security Advisor. She can appear to be either a 'war dove' or 'war hawk' depending upon the situation, but is always fair and usually right on the money with a situation. It is suggested that she becomes U.S. Ambassador to the United Nations (Seasons 2–7).
- Lieutenant Commander Jack Reese (Christian Slater): Aide to National Security Advisor Nancy McNally (season 4) and Donna's brief love interest.
- Commander Kate Harper (Mary McCormack): Deputy National Security Advisor (Seasons 5–7), who takes on many of Nancy McNally's White House duties. She has extensive CIA experience all over the world, as C.J. Cregg discovers when reading her classified personnel file. She and Will Bailey have a brief relationship. She goes on to write a book about her experiences following the end of the Bartlet administration.
- Lieutenant General Alan Adamle (Gerald McRaney): A three-star general in the USAF. Meets with Leo to discuss the International Criminal Court in episode 3.05 and stuns Leo by revealing Leo once (completely inadvertently) bombed a non-military target and killed innocent civilians, telling a devastated Leo this story to lead to his view that "All wars are crimes". He also briefs then President-elect Bartlet on a small delegation of military advisers being sent to the Philippines three days after the presidential election in episode 5.22. Served with Leo in Vietnam.
- General Shannon (Daniel von Bargen): Appears in episodes (2.01) and (2.10). A four-star general in the USAF; Leo calls him "Jack" in his first episode and "Ken" in his second appearance. He seems to be the senior officer in the Situation Room in episode 2.01 until Nancy McNally arrives.
- Lieutenant General Ed Barrie (Tom Bower): Army Chief of Staff. He appears in episode 2.05 berating C.J. for reprimanding his intentions to condemn on TV the President's failure to ensure military preparedness before his retirement, but is left silent when C.J. tells him he is wearing a Distinguished Combat Service Medal he had not earned; later however, Bartlet says the General served his country bravely and would face no White House censorship of any of his views. Despite being identified as Army Chief of Staff, he is portrayed as a three-star lieutenant general.
- General Mitch Jensen (Christopher Kriesa): A three-star Army general. Present in the Situation Room during discussions of retaliatory options to Morris Tolliver's USAF medical transport being shot down in episode 1.03. Also advises the President on the India–Kashmir crisis in episodes 1.11 and 1.12.
- Colonel Mark Chase (David Graf): Air Force officer who advises Leo on a crisis with Iraqi oil smugglers in episode 2.07, and monitors the Missile Defense Shield test in episode 2.12.
- CIA Director George Rollie (Ryan Cutrona): President Bartlet does not trust or like him, but as C.J. and Toby note in "365 Days", his pariah status is useful because it prevents the President from tearing down anyone else during tense situations.
- Mr Cashman: (unseen character) Often mentioned alongside Secretaries Hutchinson and Berryhill, implied to be a senior official at one of the Executive Branch departments, the department of either State or Defense (Seasons 1–2).
- Bobby Dunn (Gary Cervantes): Appears in episodes (1.11), (1.22), (2.01), (2.10), and (2.21); apparently a State Department official.
- Albie Duncan (Hal Holbrook): Assistant Secretary of State (office unstated). Longtime Republican and State Department elder (more than 40 years); is brought in by Leo (to the President's discomfort and displeasure) to counsel the President on the submarine crisis off of North Korea in episode (3.06); later brought in by Toby during the reelection campaign to help C.J. spin the post-debate in episode (4.06).
- Ted Barrow (Ron Canada): Assistant Secretary of State for East Asian and Pacific Affairs. Appears in Seasons 5–7. In season 5, tends to be harsh with the senior staffers and notably sympathetic to the views of North Korea; in later appearances, he is more measured and diplomatic.
- Bob Slattery (Thomas Kopache): Assistant Secretary of State for Near Eastern Affairs. Appears in Seasons 3–7.
- Miguel "Mickey" Troop (Tony Plana): Assistant Secretary of State for Western Hemisphere Affairs. Appears in season 2; advises the President on the DEA hostage crisis in Colombia, where he pushes for negotiations over a military solution and later outlines how dangerous and deadly a U.S. war against the major cartels would be.
- Mike Chysler (Glenn Morshower): (occasionally "Jack"); adviser to the President during his first term, regularly appearing in the Situation Room. Briefs the President on the DEA hostage crisis; also advises the President during the prelude to the assassination of Abdul Shareef near the end of Season 3. Appears in Seasons 2–4.

=== Secret Service/FBI ===
- Ron Butterfield (Michael O'Neill): Head of the President's Secret Service detail (Seasons 1–7).
- Mike Casper (Clark Gregg): FBI Special Agent, usually acting White House liaison (Seasons 2–5).
- Simon Donovan (Mark Harmon): Secret Service agent assigned to protect C. J. Cregg and develops a close relationship with her. Killed when he walks into an armed robbery (season 3).
- Gina Toscano (Jorja Fox): Secret Service agent assigned to protect Zoey Bartlet (Seasons 1–2)
- Wesley Davis (Taye Diggs): In charge of Zoey Bartlet's secret service detail when she is abducted (season 4)
- Molly O'Connor (Kimberly Bigsby): A young agent on Zoey's detail. Shot dead during Zoey's kidnapping. Toby and Andy's daughter is named in her memory (season 4).
- Randy Weathers (Shannon Marshall): Another young agent on Zoey Bartlet's detail (season 4)
- Jamie Reed (John Antonini): Another young agent on Zoey Bartlet's detail (season 4)
- Tom Connelly: FBI Director. Referred to in episode (Ep. 1.03).
- George Arnold (Michael Kagan): FBI Director (Ep. 5.18; 6.1).

== Politicians ==
=== Federal executive branch ===
- Matt Santos (Jimmy Smits): Democratic candidate for president in 2006. Succeeds Josiah Bartlet as President of the United States. Three-term U.S. Representative from Texas. Frustrated at legislative setbacks in the House, Santos is on the verge of announcing a decision not to seek re-election, but instead is convinced by Josh Lyman to launch a long-shot campaign for the presidency (Seasons 6–7).
- John Hoynes (Tim Matheson): President Bartlet's first vice president. Formerly Bartlet's rival for the 1998 Democratic presidential nomination, the two have a mutual resentment shared by all of Bartlet's staff except Josh Lyman. Hoynes felt that Bartlet consistently disrespected and undermined him, while Bartlet saw Hoynes as feckless and incompetent, noting the large number of political deals and relationships he fumbled. Resigned from office while under fire for leaking classified material to a woman he was having an affair with, after she announced her intention to publish a tell-all book. A candidate for the Democratic nomination for the 2006 election, until it became clear he had no chance of winning. (Seasons 1–7) He has many similarities to Lyndon B. Johnson.
- Robert "Bob" Russell (Gary Cole): President Bartlet's second vice president after the resignation of John Hoynes and a candidate for the Democratic nomination for the 2006 election (Seasons 5–7). Recruits Will Bailey as his speechwriter and later campaign manager, who in turn recruits Donna. He is viewed by most of Bartlet's staff as bland and ineffectual.
- Lewis Berryhill (William Devane): Secretary of State, known for his acerbic and confrontational personality. He was President Bartlet's choice for Vice President after John Hoynes' resignation, before it became clear he lacked support in Congress to be confirmed (Seasons 1, 4–5).
- Miles Hutchinson (Steve Ryan): Secretary of Defense. He often disagreed, loudly and at length, with the policy decisions of President Bartlet, which put him particularly at odds with Chiefs of Staff Leo McGarry and C.J. Cregg (Seasons 4–7).
- Roger Tribbey (Harry Groener): Secretary of Agriculture. Chosen to be the Cabinet's "designated survivor" during President Bartlet's first State of the Union address, later during the second term expressed concern about divided leadership when President Bartlet proposed invoking the 25th Amendment (Seasons 1 and 4).

=== Federal legislative branch ===
- Senator Seth Gillette (Ed Begley, Jr.): Democrat from North Dakota. He threatened to run against President Bartlet as a third-party candidate on a more left-wing platform in the 2002 election (Ep 2.14).
- Rep. Jeff Haffley (Steven Culp): Republican from Washington; House Majority Whip, 1997–2003, Speaker of the House, 2003–2007. He was known for repeatedly attempting to undermine the Bartlet administration and force it to cede control to the Republican majority, only to be outmaneuvered each time.
- Senator Howard Stackhouse (George Coe) Democrat from Minnesota. He ran a liberal third-party candidacy for the Presidency in 2002 but later endorsed President Bartlet (Ep 2–17, 4.04, 4–06).
- Senator Arnold Vinick (Alan Alda): Republican from California. Republican candidate for president in 2006 (Seasons 6–7). Nominee for Secretary of State in Santos Administration (season 7). Senator from 1983 to 2007, was California's senior US Senator in 2006. Chairman of a powerful Senate Committee (either Judiciary or Finance), and also served on the Foreign Relations and Environment Committees. Known for his Centrist views and refusal to compromise his personal ethics.
- Rep. Glen Allen Walken (John Goodman): Republican from Missouri; House Majority Whip, 1995–1997; House Majority Leader, 1997–2001; Speaker of the House, 2001–2003. During his time in the House, he was a staunch supporter of the military and veterans, proposed a $200 billion capital gains tax cut, and as an outdoor enthusiast supported the rights of gun owners. He became Acting President of the United States when President Bartlet temporarily relinquished power during his daughter Zoey's abduction. Later a contender for the Republican presidential nomination in the 2006 election, though he never appeared on screen in that capacity. Has similarities to Newt Gingrich.

=== State governors ===
- Eric Baker (Ed O'Neill): Governor of Pennsylvania. He is widely tipped as a front runner for the Democratic nomination for president in 2006, but Baker's surprise decision not to run at the outset leaves the race wide open. Bob Russell courts him for a Vice President position, which he is initially receptive to. When the convention is deadlocked, Baker changes his mind and enters the race from the floor as a draft candidate. However, the discovery of his wife's depression diagnosis, which he failed to disclose, causes delegates to become wary and ends his prospects. President-elect Santos nominates him for vice president following the death of Leo McGarry. (Seasons 6—7)
- Robert Ritchie (James Brolin): Governor of Florida. He was the Republican nominee for president in 2002 but was defeated by President Bartlet, who felt his dogged refusal to take a stance on any big issue made him unfit for office. (Seasons 3—4)
- Ray Sullivan (Brett Cullen): Governor of West Virginia. Republican nominee for vice president in 2006. Served as a U.S. Attorney and Attorney General of West Virginia before becoming governor. Arnold Vinick selects him as his running mate due to his popularity with the party's religious conservatives, who are skeptical of Vinick's more centrist politics. (Seasons 6–7)

== Foreign officials ==
- Maureen Graty (Pamela Salem): Prime Minister of the United Kingdom (season 6)
- Lord John Marbury (Roger Rees): British ambassador to the United States, known for his eccentric behaviour
- Defense Minister Abdul ibn Shareef of Qumar (Al No'mani): Brother of the Sultan and terrorist leader, assassinated by the United States. (Ep. 3.22)

== Campaign staff ==
- Bruno Gianelli (Ron Silver): A sharp political operative and consultant introduced in the third season as the campaign manager of Bartlet's 2002 bid for reelection, his unmatched track record of victories includes a House district that no Democrat has won in 46 years, five U.S. senators and three governors, and a win for an unspecified Israeli prime minister. The character reappears as Eric Baker's campaign manager for the 2006 Democratic primary, only to become an independent consultant to Republican nominee Arnold Vinick after Baker withdraws from the race. The change of political affiliations mirrored Ron Silver's real-world change of party affiliation, as the noted liberal actor campaigned for President George W. Bush in the 2004 presidential election.
- Josephine "Joey" Lucas (Marlee Matlin): A political consultant and pollster who is often hired by the White House and Democratic campaigns. Usually, her interactions with Bartlet or Matt Santos are arranged by Josh Lyman, who has a crush on her early on. However, their relationship remains platonic and professional. Lucas first appears in the first season as the hard-hitting, sarcastic campaign manager for a Democratic House candidate whom the White House does not take seriously. Although she does not take Barlet's recommendation that she run for office herself, she becomes the White House's go-to pollster, including conducting a secret poll to determine whether the American public would accept the president's MS. Like Matlin, Lucas is deaf.
- Kenny Thurman (Bill O'Brien): Joey Lucas's sign language interpreter (Seasons 1–7). Like Joey, he is trusted by Josh and the rest of the White House, to the point where, on the one occasion he is on vacation, Josh communicates with Joey through lip reading rather than use the substitute interpreter.
- Connie Tate (Connie Britton): A Bartlet-Hoynes reelection campaign staffer (season 3), she is a likable woman who quickly befriends Sam Seaborn. Often wins points by smoothing feathers ruffled by her acerbic co-worker Doug Wegland.
- Doug Wegland (Evan Handler): A Bartlet–Hoynes reelection campaign staffer and speechwriter (season 3), he is acerbic and finds himself offside with Toby Ziegler but ends up winning the staffers' respect with his good ideas and staunch belief in them (particularly his push for a presidential veto on the "death tax" that leads to a major political victory for the administration).
- Kevin Kahn (Patrick Breen): Former friend of Sam Seaborn. He is a staffer on Ritchie's 2002 presidential campaign (season 3) who ends up humiliating Sam by leaking an attack ad that makes the Bartlet campaign look vindictive and stupid.
- Dylan Clark (Tim Kelleher): Hoynes' campaign manager (season 6).

=== Santos campaign ===
- Louise "Lou" Thornton (Janeane Garofalo): an intelligent lobbyist described by Santos as having a "completely different take on the campaign" and by Josh as knowing "image stuff backwards and sideways", she only reluctantly agrees to Josh's request to join the Santos—–McGarry campaign as Director of Communications, when Santos agrees she can report to him directly. She acts as Josh's de facto deputy throughout the campaign, and at Josh's persuasion, accepts her appointment as Santos's Director of Communications (season 7).
- Ronna Beckman (Karis Campbell): Santos's personal assistant. She is present from the very beginning of Matt Santos's campaign for the presidency in season 6 (appearing as part of his Congressional staff). In her final appearance, Deborah Fiderer trains her as Santos's executive secretary, warning her never to revoke the First Lady's walk-in privileges, even as the President is certain to request it. She has a relationship with another female staffer (Cindy) on the Santos campaign.
- Edie Ortega (Diana-Maria Riva): Santos—–McGarry Deputy Campaign Manager for Strategic Planning (season 7).
- Lester (Cress Williams): Santos—–McGarry Campaign Consultant (season 7).
- Bram Howard (Matthew Del Negro): Staffer, Santos—–McGarry Campaign (Seasons 6–7); Santos Administration counselor to the President (season 7). Moves into Charlie Young's former office on Inauguration Day.
- Ned Carlson (Evan Arnold): A day-one aide to Congressman Santos (season 6); Staffer, Santos—–McGarry Campaign (seasons 6–7). He is removed from the campaign and reassigned to Santos's Congressional office early in season 7 after Lou considers that he is out of his depth.
- Otto (Ramon De Ocampo): Speechwriter, Santos—–McGarry Campaign (season 7); Staffer in the Santos Administration (season 7). Very young but capable man who has a campaign fling with Lou Thornton. It is implied he will have a speechwriting role in the Santos Administration.

=== Vinick campaign ===
- Sheila Brooks (Patricia Richardson): Senator Vinick's chief of staff and Vinick–Sullivan campaign manager; She, like Vinick, is portrayed as level-headed and not overtly partisan. Often at odds with the more conservative voices in the party, she leaves the campaign weeks before election day to placate the Republican base (season 6–7). In her final appearance, Brooks is mentioned as possibly being hired as Chief of Staff to the Republican Senate Majority Leader. Having renewed her friendship with Vinick, she makes an argument that convinces the Senator that he should not run for president again — and that he should accept President-elect Santos' offer to become the next Secretary of State.
- Jane Braun (Melinda McGraw): Vinick–Sullivan campaign manager after Brooks' resignation (season 7); A far-to-the-right conservative activist who replaces Sheila to energize hard-core GOP voters. However, she disgusts the rest of the campaign leadership by attempting to make an election night issue of Leo McGarry's death. Her outspoken partisanship puts her at odds with Vinick, Sheila, and Bruno Gianelli.
- Bruno Gianelli (Ron Silver): (See above).
- Bob Mayer (Stephen Root): Vinick–Sullivan speechwriter (season 6–7). Frequently mocked for his messy eating habits but extremely smart and effective (and, like Vinick and Sheila Brooks, level-headed in his conservatism), Mayer becomes fast friends with Gianelli. On election night, the two briefly discuss forming a consulting firm when Mayer firmly declares he is never going to become involved in daily governance, but Gianelli politely declines because the campaign life has worn him down and he plans to retire to his home in upstate New York. Along with Sheila, Bob advises Vinick to accept Santos' offer as the next Secretary of State.

== Media ==
- Danny Concannon (Timothy Busfield): senior White House correspondent for The Washington Post and C.J. Cregg's most enduring love interest; it is revealed in a flash forward in season 7 that, three years after the end of the Bartlet administration (and of the time frame covered by the series), the two have been living together in LA and have had a baby together. (Seasons 1–2, 4–5, 7).
- Greg Brock (Sam Robards): White House correspondent for The New York Times. (Greg Brock is also the name of a real editor for The New York Times, unrelated to the fictional one of the same name.) One of the White House correspondents who is most regularly referred to (second only to Danny Concannon). He writes a story that reveals the classified information that a military space shuttle exists that could be used to rescue three astronauts on the International Space Station who are running out of oxygen. Brock's source is initially suspected to be C. J. Cregg, whose phone records show a large number of calls to him. He refuses to reveal his source, is accordingly held in contempt of court, and goes to jail. He is presumably released after White House Communications Director Toby Ziegler confesses to the leak, saying that Brock was the only reporter to whom he leaked the information. Some commentators have compared this storyline to the Valerie Plame affair. (Seasons 5–7).
- Roger Salier (Ivan Allen): Television anchor on News Center 4 (Seasons 1–7).
- Mark Gottfried (Ted McGinley): Talk show host of Capital Beat (Episodes 2.04, 2.13 & 2.14).
- Diane Mathers (Kathrin Middleton): Tough talk show host who interviews Zoey Bartlet about her kidnapping and John Hoynes about his intentions to run for president again (Episodes 5.07 & 6.07).
- Taylor Reid (Jay Mohr): Conservative talk show host, baits C. J. Cregg by calling her a "chicken" (season 5). Some reviewers have likened the character to Bill O'Reilly, the combative host of the news commentary show The O'Reilly Factor.
- Will Sawyer (Michael O'Keefe): Appears in the episode "War Crimes" (season 3.05) as a White House correspondent while awaiting a new overseas assignment after escaping from Myanmar.
- Katarina "Katie" Witt (Kris Murphy): White House Press Corps Reporter (Seasons 1–7).
- Mark O'Donnell (Timothy Davis-Reed): White House Press Corps Reporter. Episode 3:08 – says he is from Canada. (season 2–7)
- Steve (Charles Noland): White House Press Corps Reporter, from AP. (season 1–7)
- Chris (Mindy Seeger): White House Press Corps Reporter. (season 1–7)
- Charlayne (Joyce Guy): White House Press Corps Reporter. (season 5–7)
- Gordon (Tom Chick): White House Press Corps Reporter. (season 5–7)

== Family ==
=== Josiah Bartlet's family ===
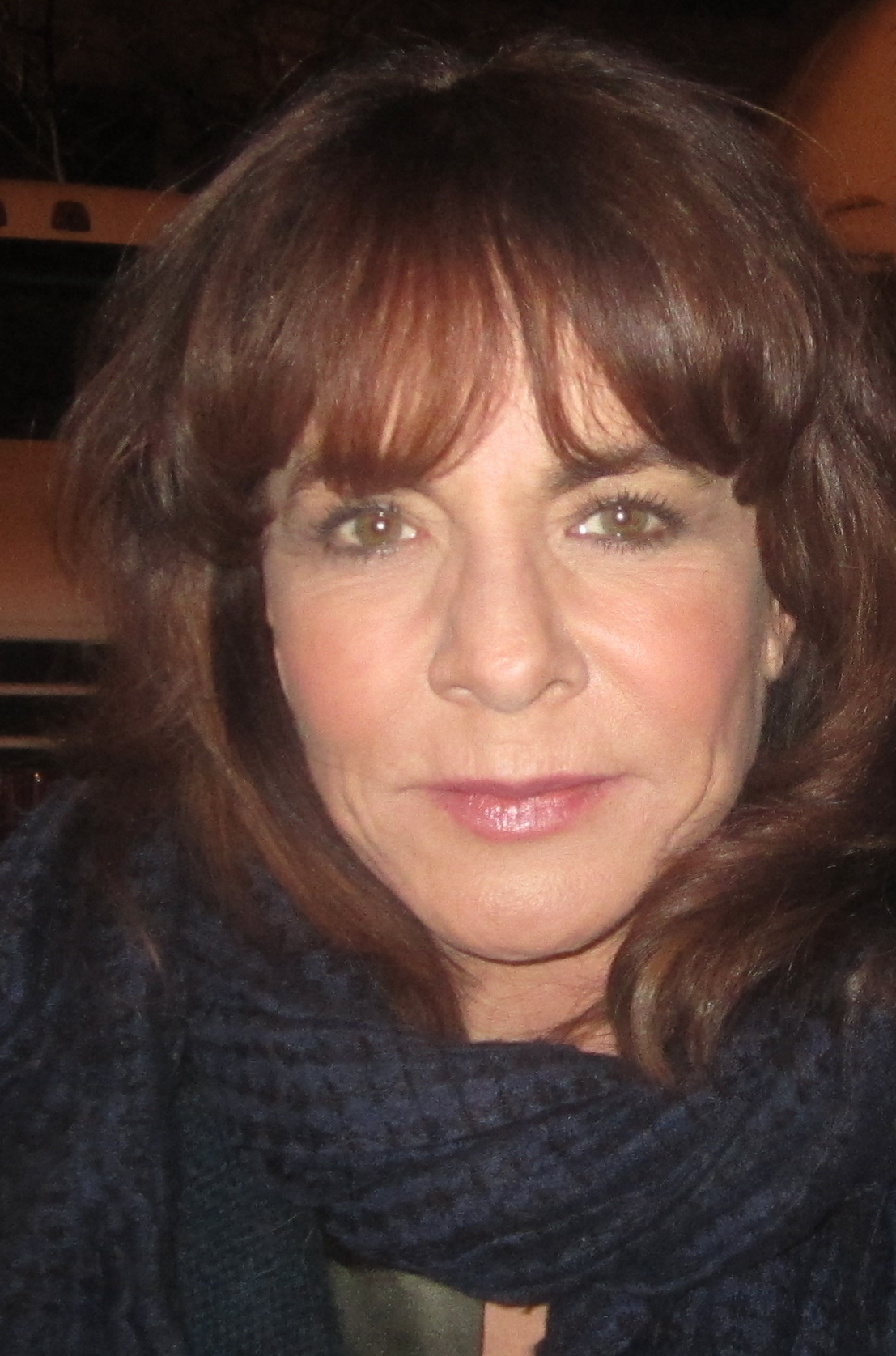
Stockard Channing played First Lady Abbey Bartlett

- Abigail Ann "Abbey" Bartlet, M.D. (Stockard Channing): First Lady of the United States (Seasons 1–7). She is board certified in cardiothoracic surgery and internal medicine and has admitting privileges at several New England hospitals. In the first season, it is revealed that she and the president had an agreement that he would only serve as president for one term due to his MS; in the second season, various characters learn that she has been secretly treating him with betaseron in violation of medical ethics and various state laws. At the climax of the MS scandal, Abbey agrees to voluntarily surrender her medical license for the duration of Bartlet's term. Although she enjoys high popularity and has a degree of political agency, Abbey struggles with advancing her own political agenda, which eventually leads her to hire Amy Gardner as her chief of staff.
- Jonathan Bartlet: Josiah Bartlet's younger brother (mentioned, never seen)
- Elizabeth "Liz" Bartlet Westin (Annabeth Gish): The President's eldest daughter, married with two children. (Seasons 5–7). President Bartlet thinks she is the real political mind in her marriage and that she should run for office instead of her husband.
- Eleanor Emily "Ellie" Bartlet Faison, M.D. (Nina Siemaszko): The President's middle daughter, a medical researcher. (Seasons 2, 5, 7) In her first appearance she is still in medical school and is not sure what specialty to pick; it is later revealed that she has chosen to specialize in oncology. She and her father love each other, but they are very different in personality, and President Bartlet has said that Ellie is "her mother's daughter".
- Zoey Patricia Bartlet (Elisabeth Moss): The President's youngest daughter (Seasons 1–2, 4–7). Her on-and-off relationship with his personal aide Charlie Young forms the bulk of her storyline across the series.
- Dr. Bartlet (Lawrence O'Donnell): The President's deceased father. He appears during flashbacks in season 2's "Two Cathedrals". An overbearing man described by Mrs Landingham as a "prick who could never get over the fact that he wasn't as smart at his brothers" and took out his limitations on his brilliant leader of a son.
- Doug Westin (Steven Eckholdt): Liz's husband. Neither the President nor his senior staff think much of him: the President because he does not think Doug is really worthy of marrying Elizabeth, the staff because they view him as an empty suit. Has an adulterous affair with the family's nanny exposed and unsuccessfully runs for the House of Representatives representing New Hampshire in 2006 (Seasons 5–7).
- Vic Faison (Ben Weber): Ellie's fiancé, later husband. A scientist studying fruit flies, he earned President Barlet's respect when he admitted that he was not marrying Ellie due to her being pregnant but knew Ellie was the one on their third date. Vic has difficulty coping with the fact that his wedding has become a state occasion, but comes to terms with it (Season 7).
- Annie Westin: The President's granddaughter and Liz's daughter, aged 12 in season 1. (Season 5, episode 1).
- Gus Westin (Michael Krepack): The President's grandson and Liz's son (Season 5).

=== Leo McGarry's family ===
- Mallory O'Brien (Allison Smith): Leo McGarry's daughter, a schoolteacher who, following a disastrous first encounter, embarks on a brief relationship with Sam Seaborn, something Leo is playfully annoyed by (Seasons 1–2, 4–7).
- Jenny McGarry (Sara Botsford): Leo McGarry's wife. Divorces him due to his work commitments (season 1).
- Josephine McGarry (Deborah Hedwall): Leo McGarry's sister, who works as an educator (season 2). Avowedly against school prayer, she is forced to withdraw from consideration for a position with the Department of Education when Leo finds out she ordered the arrest of students who were praying and arranged for the arrest to be publicized.
- Elizabeth McGarry: Leo McGarry's sister, never seen but mentioned in the episode "In Excelsis Deo" (season 1).

=== C. J. Cregg's family ===
- Hogan Cregg (Evan Rachel Wood): C.J.'s niece (season 3).
- Molly Lapham Cregg (Verna Bloom): C.J.'s stepmother and her former high school English teacher (season 4).
- Talmidge Cregg (Donald Moffat): C.J.'s father, a retired math teacher with Alzheimer's disease (season 4).
- Grammy Cregg: Mentioned as the Midwestern source of C.J.'s "Hay is for Horses" witticism.
- Two older brothers: Mentioned in "The Black Vera Wang".
- Danny Concannon (Timothy Busfield): senior White House correspondent for The Washington Post and love interest for C.J. Cregg; the two have a child together and have been living together for three years (marriage not confirmed in dialogue) as revealed in the last episode (Seasons 1–2, 4–5, 7).

=== Josh Lyman's family ===
- Joanie Lyman: Josh's older sister who died in a fire when she was babysitting him.
- Noah Lyman: Josh's father, a successful lawyer and longtime Democratic Party supporter, who was good friends with Leo McGarry. He died on the night of the Illinois primary (during Bartlet's first presidential campaign).
- Mrs. Lyman: Josh's mother and only living relative. She lives in Florida and Josh usually visits her during holidays.

=== Toby Ziegler's family ===
- Andrea Wyatt (Kathleen York): Ex-wife of Toby Ziegler, Congresswoman from Maryland.
- Molly Wyatt: Toby and Andrea's daughter, named after Molly O'Conner, the secret service agent shot and killed the night of Zoey Bartlet's kidnapping, the night of her and Huck's birth (Seasons 4, 7).
- Huckleberry "Huck" Wyatt: Toby and Andrea's son, named after Andrea's grandfather (Seasons 4, 7).
- Jules "Julie" Ziegler (Jerry Adler): Toby's father, former member of Murder Incorporated, retired ladies' raincoat maker (season 4).
- David Ziegler:(mentioned, never seen) Toby's brother, NASA astronaut, who dies by suicide in season 6 following a cancer diagnosis.
- Sisters: (mentioned, never seen), Took Toby to protests when he was young.

=== Donna Moss's family ===
- Aunt Barbara: Aunt from Wisconsin whom Donna leads on private tour. (season 5)
- Uncle Ted: Uncle from Wisconsin whom Donna leads on private tour. (season 5)
- Cousins in Oklahoma: Mentioned in "Disaster Relief" (season 5)
- Mother: Comes to visit when Donna is hospitalized in Germany after the Gaza attack.

=== Will Bailey's family ===
- Elsie Snuffin (Danica McKellar): Will Bailey's stepsister.
- Thomas Bailey: Will's father, a former Supreme Allied Commander Europe.

=== Charlie Young's family ===
- Deanna Young: Charlie's younger sister.
- Mrs Young: Charlie's mother, a Washington, D.C. policewoman who was shot and killed in the line of duty prior to the start of the series by a gunman who was never arrested. (Mentioned, seen only in a photo.)
- Grandparents: Mentioned in "The State Dinner" as living in Georgia and not getting around too well

=== Matt Santos's family ===
- Helen Santos (Teri Polo): Matt Santos's wife (season 6–7)
- Peter Santos (Joshua Cabrera): Matt Santos's son (season 6–7)
- Miranda Santos (Ashlyn Sanchez): Matt Santos's daughter (season 6–7)
- Jorge Santos (David Barrera): Matt's Santos's brother (season 7), a failure in life who nearly ruins his brother's presidential bid when the Vinick campaign thinks they have evidence Matt Santos has an illegitimate child; in fact, Matt discovered that Jorge refused to support his ex-girlfriend, and therefore set up secret payments to help her on his own.

== Other characters ==
- Laurie (Lisa Edelstein): Sam Seaborn's friend. Law student working as a call girl (season 1 and mentioned several times in 2).
- Al Kiefer (John de Lancie): Democratic pollster who had a short relationship with Joey Lucas. The senior staff cannot stand him, and when Joey's abilities became apparent, she takes over his previous role as the Bartlet administration's top pollster (season 1).
- Larry Claypool (John Diehl): Freedom Watch lawyer (Seasons 1, 4) who spends his time filing lawsuits against President Bartlet and his staff in hopes of bringing down the administration
- Bernard Thatch (Paxton Whitehead): Head of the White House Visitor's Office (Ep 2.10, Ep 6.07).
- Ann Stark (Felicity Huffman): Toby Ziegler's former friend, until she betrays him when he tries to broker a compromise on patients' rights. Chief of Staff to the Senate Majority Leader (Ep 2.11)
- Roberto Mendoza (Edward James Olmos): Short-list nominee and later confirmed Associate Justice of the Supreme Court. (Ep 1.9, Ep 1.15)
- Lisa Sherborne (Traylor Howard): Sam Seaborn's former fiancée who now works for Vanity Fair. Sam broke off their engagement because he wanted to leave the New York scene and work at the White House (Ep 3.11).
- Dr. Stanley Keyworth (Adam Arkin): A psychiatrist from San Francisco who specializes in trauma cases. He is asked by Leo McGarry to see Josh after Josh yells at the President. Staff Therapist for the American Trauma Victims Association (ATVA), has several sessions as the President's therapist as well. (Seasons 2–4)
- Jordon Elaine Kendall (Joanna Gleason): Leo McGarry's lawyer during the Bartlet MS hearings and love interest for several months (season 3–4)
- Tabatha Fortis (Laura Dern): United States Poet Laureate (season 3.16)
- Alana Waterman (Lee Garlington): Toby Ziegler's attorney, called upon when Toby confesses to the White House leak. (season 7, Garlington also appeared in the pilot episode as a militant anti-abortion activist.)
- Jean Paul Pierre Claude Charpentier, Vicomte de Condé de Bourbon (Trent Ford): Zoey Bartlet's French boyfriend. (season 4)
- Colin Ayres (Jason Isaacs): Photographer who has a fling with Donna Moss in the episode "Gaza". (season 5–6)
- Lt. Colonel Gantry: pilot of Air Force One, heard several times on personal announcements on the plane.
- Colonel Jesse Weisskopf (James Morrison): pilot of Air Force One, seen in the episode "Angel Maintenance" (season 4) informing the President on the status of the plane.
- Dr. Millicent Griffith (Mary Kay Place): Close family friend of the Bartlets, Ellie's godmother, occasional medical adviser to the President, and President Bartlet's Surgeon General (Ep. 2.15, Ep. 6.08, Ep. 6.09; mentioned in Ep. 2.18)
- Reverend Don Butler (Don S. Davis): A conservative televangelist from Virginia, who is a candidate for the Republican Party's nomination for President of the United States in the 2006 election, but is defeated by Arnold Vinick and politely declines Vinick's offer of the Vice President spot because he cannot support Vinick's pro-choice positions.
- Bobby Zane (Noah Emmerich): Defense lawyer for a convicted murderer and high school bully of Sam Seaborn. He contacts Sam to persuade the White House to commute his client's death sentence (Ep. 1.14).
- Marco (Matthew Modine): A horologist and high school classmate of C. J. Cregg who helps her deal with her father's steady mental decline due to Alzheimer's disease. Appears in the episode "The Long Goodbye" (Ep. 4.13).
- Morris Tolliver (Ruben Santiago-Hudson): He was a physician and Navy officer (Captain), who served as a temporary replacement at the position of Physician to the President of the United States. Despite his relatively low rank for the position, Bartlet liked him and Leo McGarry asked him to stay on full-time. Before he could assume the position, however, a plane he was on during a diplomatic mission was shot down over the Middle East, which prompted the President to "overreact" in the next episode "A Proportional Response". Dr. Tolliver was married to Angela and their daughter's name was Cory. The child was named for her great-grandmother, who had been named after her great-aunt, who got it from the first free woman she ever met. Appears in the episode "Post Hoc, Ergo Propter Hoc" (Ep. 1.2).
- Steve Atwood (Željko Ivanek): Republican Chief of Staff to Glen Allen Walken when he was Speaker of the House. He follows Walken to the White House when the Speaker resigns from his post to step in for Bartlet as president. Finds himself at odds with Josh Lyman, who accuses Atwood of conspiring with Walken and the Republican Party for pushing their agenda during the presidency. Atwood denies it, citing that he and the party are in awe of Bartlet for his actions under the 25th Amendment (Ep. 5.1, Ep. 5.2).

=== Former presidents ===
- D. Wire "D.W." Newman (James Cromwell): the last Democrat president prior to Bartlet. During his term, the administration held strong ties with Middle Eastern countries, including Saudi Arabia, selling them arms in exchange for oil and supported their leaders. Newman openly showed enmity for Glen Allen Walken's conservative views. A liberal Democrat that served one term, analogous to Jimmy Carter.
- Owen Lassiter: A two-term conservative Republican president from California that defeated Newman for reelection. Lassiter's administration is seen with disdain by Bartlet and his staff for his conservative policies. In his post presidency, Lassiter collected dirt samples in jars from battlefields where Americans served. He also regularly called Newman and Bartlet to discuss issues of the day or former Presidents. Lassiter convinced a furious Newman to not publicly denounce Bartlet during the MS scandal. Comparable to Ronald Reagan.
- Glen Allen Walken (John Goodman): Republican from Missouri; House Majority Whip, 1995–1997; House Majority Leader, 1997–2001; Speaker of the House, 2001–2003. During his time in the House, he was a staunch supporter of the military and veterans, proposed a $200 billion capital gains tax cut, an outdoor enthusiast that supported the rights of gun owners. He became Acting President of the United States when President Bartlet temporarily relinquished power. Later a contender for the Republican presidential nomination in the 2006 election. Has similarities to Newt Gingrich.

== Pets ==
- Bess: Glen Allen Walken's pug.
- Gail: C. J. Cregg's pet goldfish. A gift from Danny Concannon. In "The Short List" (Ep. 1.9), Josh Lyman tells Danny that C.J. likes "goldfish". Although Josh is referring to the snack crackers of the same name, Danny mistakenly believes he is referring to the aquatic creature; after giving C.J. the fish, Danny mentions that the pet-store owner had named it "Gail". On the DVD commentary track for Ep. 1.10, "In Excelsis Deo", Aaron Sorkin, Thomas Schlamme, and Alex Graves mention that the prop masters created a miniature Christmas ornament to place on the floor of Gail's fish bowl and that from then on, the prop masters often crafted tiny decorations related to the themes in a given episode. For example, when hostilities were escalating in India and Pakistan, the bowl contained a tiny bomb shelter.

== See also ==
- The West Wing
- List of The West Wing episodes
