= Burn bag =

Bag used to contain classified items for burning

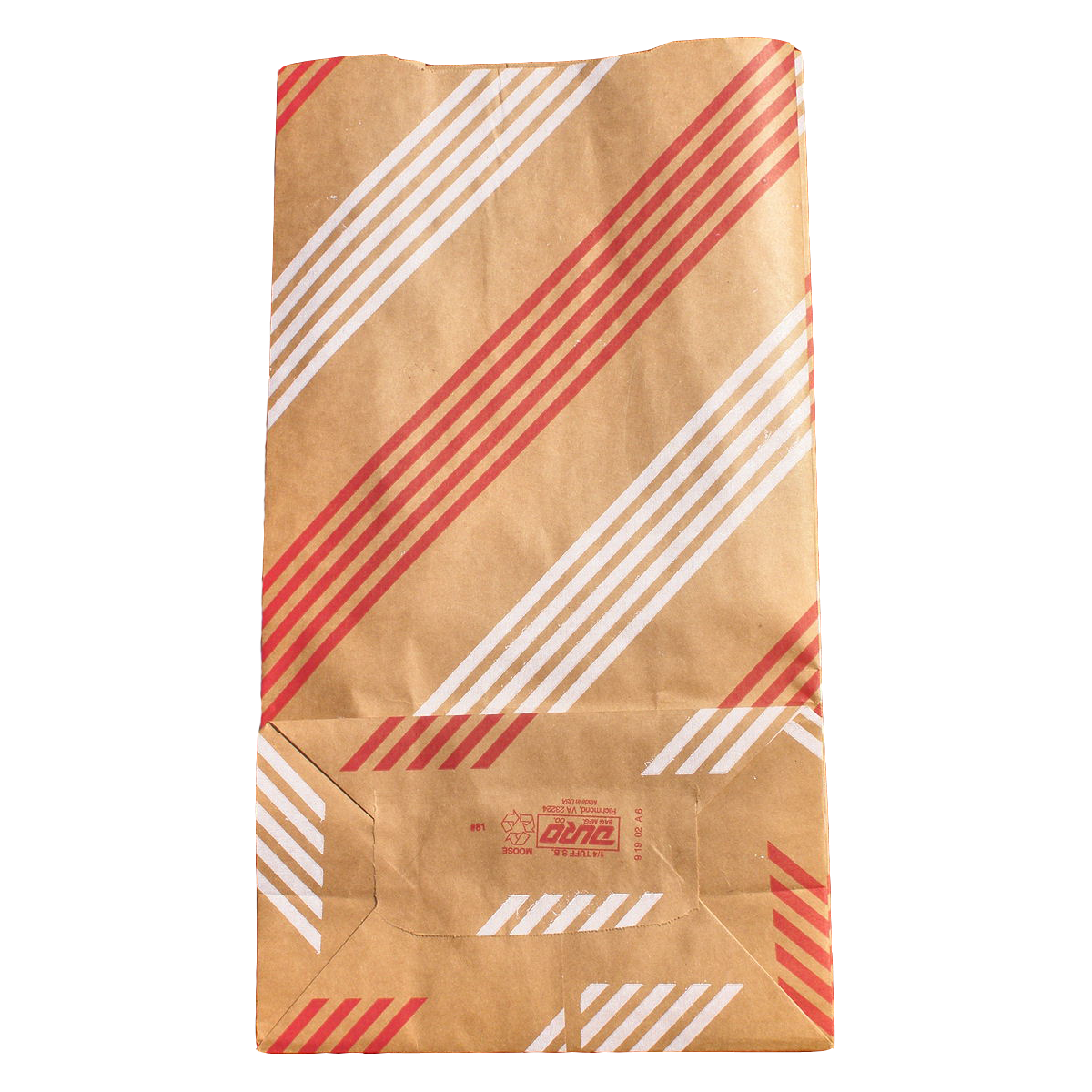
A typical paper burn bag as used by the United States Department of Defense.

A burn bag is a security bag that holds sensitive or classified documents which are to be destroyed by fire or pulping after a certain period of time. The most common usage of burn bags is by government institutions, in the destruction of classified materials.

Burn bags are designed to facilitate the destruction process by not requiring the removal of the items to be destroyed beforehand and by indicating if the items require special procedures. Destruction via burn bags is considered superior to shredding, because shredded documents may be reconstructed. After the capture of the United States embassy in Tehran during the Iran hostage crisis, shredded documents were turned over for painstaking manual reconstruction, which revealed to Iran some U.S. operations, including spies.

== Usage ==
=== In government institutions ===
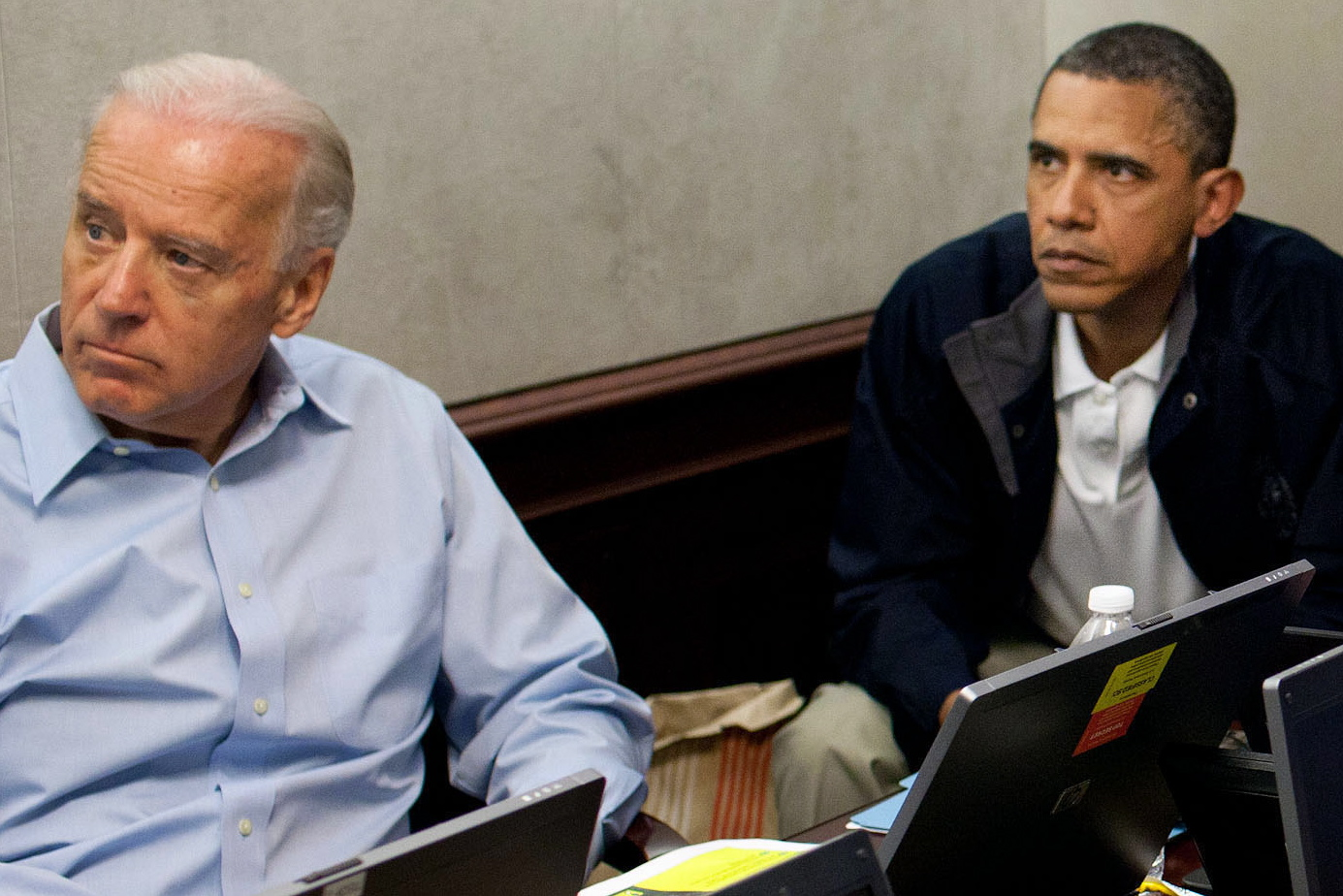
An opened burn bag rests between American vice-president Joe Biden (left) and President Barack Obama (right) as they listen to an update on Operation Neptune Spear in the Situation Room of the White House

Burn bags are generally associated with US governmental organizations like the CIA and NSA, due to the classified nature of their work. Most other governmental organizations have some form of burn bag system to destroy documents deemed of a Top Secret, Secret, Classified, or other similar nature.

Burn bags are mostly used to satisfy destruction of articles pursuant under Executive Order 12958 section 1.4, in part:

Classified information must fall under one of the following categories:
1.4 (a) Military plans, weapons systems, or operations;
1.4 (b) Foreign government information;
1.4 (c) Intelligence activities, sources or methods or cryptology;
1.4 (d) Foreign relations or foreign activities of the United States including
1.4 (e) Scientific, technological or economic matters relating to national security;
1.4 (f) United States Government programs for safeguarding nuclear materials or facilities;
1.4 (g) Vulnerabilities or capabilities of systems, installations, projects or plan relating to the national security; or,
1.4 (h) weapons of mass destruction

The order was subsequently replaced by Executive Order 13526.

Due to environmental concerns and the high value of recycled paper, institutions that generate large amounts of classified material tend to securely desensitize their data in disintegrators with a 3/32" NSA/DOD approved top-secret screen. Even though the moniker "burn bag" is still very popular, rarely within the United States is classified material incinerated.

Overseas military outposts and diplomatic missions frequently have emergency disposal procedures in place for the rapid burning of classified materials. These often include special burn bags with built-in thermite charges.

=== Haz-mat usage ===
The term "burn bag" can also refer to bags that contain haz-mat protective gear after inspection of sources deemed hazardous.

=== In private businesses ===
Document destruction companies have rarely used burning in disposing of documents, mainly opting to shred material before disposal. However, due to the possibility that shredded material can be reconstructed, and recent increases in identity theft and corporate espionage, some services have started to offer destruction by burning instead of disposal into landfills.

The waste-to-energy industry often offers a "secure disposal" service to allow businesses to use the waste-to-energy plants' municipal waste incineration units for sensitive material disposal. Services range from a basic drop-off at the facility to actually having a witness to the incineration process and issuance of a certificate of destruction.

== In popular culture ==
- A burn bag is used prominently in the movie Spy Game. In it, the character Nathan Muir uses a burn bag to hide—and subsequently destroy—documents he was keeping from the CIA pertaining to his protégé, Tom Bishop.
- A similar document destruction system (sans burn bags) called the "memory hole" is used in the Ministry of Truth (Newspeak: Minitrue) in the George Orwell novel Nineteen Eighty-Four.
- Burn bags are featured in the works of many military and espionage authors. The works of Tom Clancy and W. E. B. Griffin feature them prominently.
- In an episode of The West Wing ("Let Bartlet Be Bartlet"), Josh asks Mandy if she's ever heard of a burn bag relating to a memo which is critical of the President.
- The July 5, 2007 installment of the Garry Trudeau Doonesbury comic refers to Vice President Dick Cheney burn-bagging lawyers who have written secret legal opinions.
- In the movie American Made, a burn bag is used by C.I.A. employees to disassociate any connection with the main protagonist, Barry Seal.
- In the Showtime series Billions season two finale "Ball in Hand", Bobby Axelrod uses a burn up box instead of a burn bag to destroy evidence of his involvement in securities fraud.
- In the 2012 movie Argo, about the Iran hostage crisis, the Americans in their embassy in Iran tried to burn their embassy documents in a furnace but it malfunctioned and they had to use a paper shredder.

== See also ==
- Burn After Reading – 2008 film directed by Joel and Ethan Coen
