= Amy Gardner =

American television character, created 2001

- The West Wing character
- Mary-Louise Parker as Amy Gardner
- First appearance: "The Women of Qumar" season 3, episode 9
- Created by: Aaron Sorkin
- Portrayed by: Mary-Louise Parker

Amelia Gardner is a fictional character portrayed by Mary-Louise Parker on The West Wing, an American serial political drama. Created in the show's third season after a voicemail from Parker to the show's creator, Amy serves as both a feminist viewpoint on the show and a love interest for Josh Lyman. While critics generally approved of her feminist ideals, they were split on whether her romance with Josh was better or worse than his relationship with his former assistant, Donna Moss.

== Creation ==
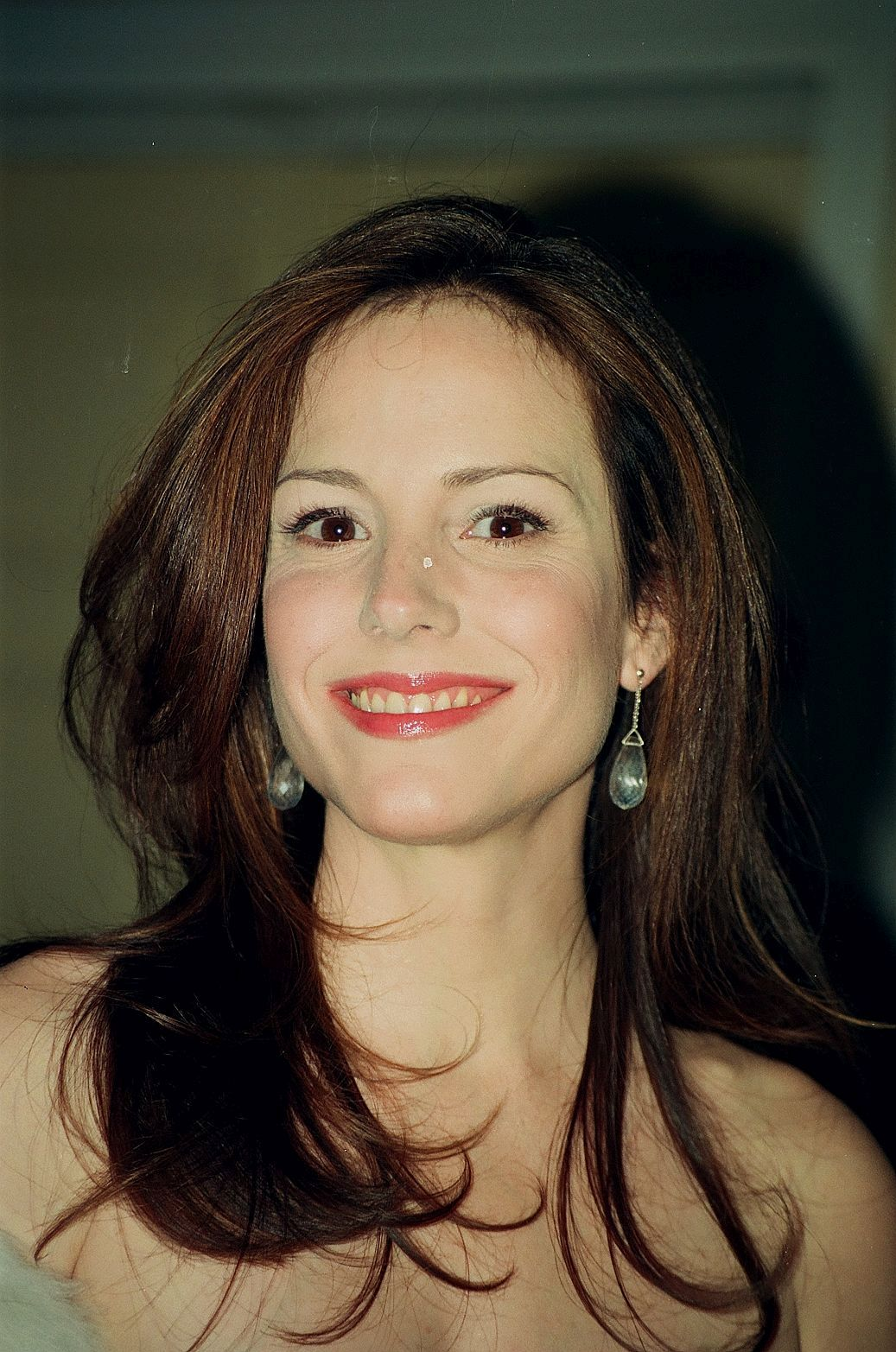
Mary-Louise Parker landed the role of Amy Gardner after an unsolicited voicemail to Aaron Sorkin.

According to the creator of The West Wing, Aaron Sorkin, Amy's character came about when Mary-Louise Parker called him and left a voicemail that simply said "Hi, this is Mary-Louise Parker. Josh Lyman badly needs to get laid, and I’m the one to do it". Her first appearance was in the third season episode "The Women of Qumar". Author Patrick Webster speculates that Sydney Ellen Wade, a character in The American President, was the forerunner for Amy. Steve Heisler with The A.V. Club, however, draws a parallel between Amy and another Sorkin character, Rebecca Wells on Sports Night.

Parker was originally meant to be in only a single episode, a feminist operative connected to First Lady Abbey Bartlet. However, she kept appearing in more and more episodes at the requests of the producers; this eventually resulted in Amy's romance with Josh Lyman, the White House Deputy Chief of Staff. Bradley Whitford, who played Josh, told The Washington Post in 2006 that he personally would have preferred that his character end up in a relationship with Amy. Parker, on the other hand, thought that her character's arc became "too soapy" when she began dating Josh, despite fan approval.

Parker had to leave her role by October 2003, at least in part due to her pregnancy with her son, William Atticus. Her last appearance was in the fifth-season episode "Constituency of One", until she reprised her role in the final few episodes of the show.

== Role ==
Amy held multiple jobs over the course of the show, including chief of staff to the first lady, a campaign consultant and political operative, and the White House Director of Legislative Affairs.

Amy is introduced to the show as a hardline feminist; her first scene places her as an executive from a women's political action group, asked to meet with Josh Lyman in her office about a United Nations prostitution treaty. Amy continually presses Josh on an issue in the treaty, eventually threatening to stall the judicial nominations made by President Josiah Bartlet. To reassure Josh, she comments "I didn’t burn my bras, J. In fact, I like my bras. I ring your bell when it's important". This allows Amy to soften her aura and show that she is still part of the system—not a "crazy" feminist to be scared of—without apologizing for her viewpoint. Patrick Webster contended that Amy was still "perhaps the one character in the series with a clear feminist viewpoint, and the only character to have a genuinely militant attitude towards equality of the genders".

Amy's role as a progressive and an idealist, however, is often at odds with or even neutralized by her romance with Josh. In the third-season episode, "We Killed Yamamoto", Amy and Josh are spending an evening together, watching a baseball game and cooking stew, when a dispute arises over a "marriage incentives" attachment on an otherwise beneficial bill. Amy opposes passing the bill with the attachment, remarking that "these old, fat-assed men really believe that if they just pay people to act like Leave It to Beaver, everything will be fine". She tries to sink the bill by organizing women's political groups; Josh, still supporting the bill despite its flaw, reminds Amy that the president is still vastly preferable to his opponent. The dispute poses a threat to their relationship and when Josh tries to call the White House to organize a counter push, Amy tosses his phone in the stew. Josh is reprimanded by both the president and his chief of staff, Leo McGarry, for not being able to "tame" Amy. In the end, the White House gets the bill passed—Josh explains that he bribed Amy's boss. Losing the vote also causes Amy to lose her job and her relationship with Josh.

Midway through the fourth season, Amy is hired by the first lady, to put a political heavyweight behind her agenda. She resigns the position in "Constituency of One", commenting to President Bartlet that "I wasn't made to serve at someone else's pleasure". Webster opined that this showed Amy's detachment to the cult-like following other characters could show towards the president. Authors Simon Philpott and David Mutimer argued that Amy, along with Joey Lucas, Mandy Hampton, and Ainsley Hayes, are allowed to challenge and oppose the male characters because they are not treated as core characters, and do not have jobs dependent on the president or male senior staff.

== Reception and influence ==
Reception for Amy as a character has been generally positive, although critics are split on whether she was the right match for Josh as opposed to Donna. The Atlantic ranked Amy fifth out of 144 in their list of the best characters on The West Wing.

Vulture ranked Amy 23rd in their list of the 38 best characters created by Aaron Sorkin, writing that she was a committed feminist and a respectable character "if you can forgive her season-long cockblock of Donna". The A.V. Club listed Josh and Amy as one of television's "18 tough-luck couples that should have succeeded", praising Amy as a "beautiful, intelligent, and confident" character. However, the article also criticized the show for the stilted and on-and-off nature of the relationship, given Josh's pre-existing chemistry with Donna, and how it harmed Amy's character arc.

For her portrayal of Amy Gardner, Mary-Louise Parker was nominated for a Primetime Emmy Award for Outstanding Supporting Actress in a Drama Series. The award ultimately went to co-cast member Stockard Channing for her portrayal of Abbey Bartlet.

The character of Freya Gardner on 2013 British television series The Politician's Husband takes her name from Amy, along with several other West Wing surnames found in the show. Amy's onscreen relationship also struck a chord with viewers; Parker recounted in a 2020 interview that fans would frequently approach her in public, sometimes telling her that "she's stealing him from Donna".
