= Short list (disambiguation) =

A short list or shortlist is a list of candidates for a job, prize, award, political position, etc., that has been reduced from a longer list of candidates.

Short list or Shortlist may also refer to:

- Shortlist Music Prize, an American music award given from 2001 to 2007
- ShortList, a British magazine in circulation from 2007 to 2018
- "The Short List", a 1999 episode of The West Wing
