= Trash Day =

Trash Day may refer to:

- "Trash Day" (2 Stupid Dogs), a 1993 episode of 2 Stupid Dogs
- "Trash Day", a 1997 episode of Dr. Katz, Professional Therapist
- "Trash Day", the English title of a 2000 episode of Digimon Adventure
- "Trash Day", a 2003 song by "Weird Al" Yankovic from his album Poodle Hat

== See also ==
- Garbage Day (disambiguation)
- "Take out the Trash Day", a 2000 episode of the television show The West Wing
