= Two Cathedrals =

- The West Wing episode
- Episode no.: Season 2 Episode 22
- Directed by: Thomas Schlamme
- Written by: Aaron Sorkin
- Production code: 226222
- Original air date: May 16, 2001

Guest appearances
- Stockard Channing as Abbey Bartlet; Anna Deavere Smith as Nancy McNally; Kirsten Nelson as Young Dolores Landingham; NiCole Robinson as Margaret Hooper; Lawrence O'Donnell as Dr. Bartlet; John Bennett Perry as Bill Wakefield; Kathryn Joosten as Dolores Landingham

Episode chronology
| ← Previous "18th and Potomac" | Next → "Manchester (Part I)" |
- The West Wing season 2

"Two Cathedrals" is the 44th episode and second season finale of The West Wing. It was first broadcast on May 16, 2001, on NBC.

President Bartlet is beset by memories of Mrs. Landingham as her funeral approaches. Meanwhile, the staff deals with a crisis in Haiti and questions from congressional Democrats regarding Bartlet's health, following his disclosure that he has multiple sclerosis (MS). "Two Cathedrals" is widely considered to be one of the greatest episodes of The West Wing and one of the best episodes in television history.

== Synopsis ==
Leo McGarry (John Spencer) is talking to two Democrats who are convinced that the White House's cover-up of President Bartlet's multiple sclerosis will be a significant obstacle for House Democrats seeking re-election. They ask whether the President will seek a second term, but Leo only says that there will be a press conference that night, and that they should watch.

Toby Ziegler (Richard Schiff) is preparing the Mural Room for the President's statement when Sam Seaborn (Rob Lowe) asks if the President is ready, so soon after Mrs. Landingham's death in a car accident (at the end of "18th and Potomac"). Toby tells him they have no choice and, despite her funeral, they will be proceeding with the plan to publicly address Bartlet's MS. Toby is offered a 'lifeboat' by way of a job offer, but turns it down in a show of loyalty to the President. C. J. Cregg (Allison Janney) gathers reporters from several news agencies in her office to 'leak' information about the President's disease. Josh Lyman (Bradley Whitford) gives her a brief for a press briefing about an ongoing tobacco lawsuit, but she tells him that with the story the President is about to reveal, even news about an ongoing diplomatic situation in Haiti will be ignored by the press.

Throughout the day, Bartlet revisits his early memories of Mrs. Landingham (Kirsten Nelson) when she was a secretary at his prep school where his father was headmaster. In one flashback sequence, she pushes a young Bartlet (Jason Widener) to challenge his father about pay inequality between women and men working at the school. Mrs. Landingham clearly sees something in Jed, "a boy king ... blessed with inspiration." She comments that if Bartlet won't say anything because he's afraid or can't be bothered, then she doesn't even want to know him. He then puts his hands in his pockets, looks away, and smiles, which Mrs. Landingham understands to mean that he has decided to act, and will talk to his father. When he attempts to do so, however, his father confronts him about an article in the school paper he co-authored protesting book bans, and when Jed begins to argue his father strikes him, dissuading Jed from bringing up the pay disparity.

Bartlet and his staff attend Mrs. Landingham's funeral at the National Cathedral. Afterward, a grief-stricken Bartlet remains alone in the cathedral, railing at God in both Latin, and English. He then lights a cigarette, drops it on the cathedral floor, and grinds it under his foot before angrily declaring that he will not run again: "You get Hoynes!". Later, in the Oval Office, as a pre-season tropical storm rages outside, Bartlet has a vision of Mrs. Landingham (Kathryn Joosten), who tells him that if he isn't going to run because he thinks he won't win or because it will be too hard, she doesn't even want to know him.

Bartlet and his entourage then travel to the State Department to give a press conference on the disclosure of his MS. Shots of the motorcade driving in the rain are intercut with shots in the cathedral, where a janitor finds the extinguished cigarette. Beginning the press conference, Bartlet disregards advice to first call upon a handpicked reporter who will not ask about re-election, choosing instead one who immediately asks if he will seek a second term as president. Bartlet puts his hands in his pockets, looks away, and smiles, indicating his intention to seek re-election.

== Production ==
=== Writing ===
Aaron Sorkin was inspired to write the death of Mrs. Landingham into the show after Kathryn Joosten told him that she had auditioned for a role in a pilot episode for another series (CBS's Joan of Arcadia). Sorkin explained how he opted to "embrace the problem rather than just sweeping it away", and find the drama in the opportunity:

I decided in that moment that, by the end of the season, I wanted to push Bartlet to the place where he would renounce his faith in God—this very devout Catholic.

Sorkin explained that the Latin monologue in the National Cathedral was written in the language in order to avoid censorship by network NBC. NBC initially refused to allow a line where Mrs. Landingham describes the President's father as a "prick". Explaining its use, Sorkin stated, "It was the right word and the slightly startling nature of it was really what you needed."

=== Casting ===
Casting director Kevin Scott described the process of casting the younger versions of Bartlet (Jason Widener) and Mrs. Landingham (Kirsten Nelson):

We were looking for Martin Sheen at about 17 and Mrs. Landingham at about 22. That was not easy. It wasn't just about a look, but a quality that each actor has, I wanted to hire actors that would make you say, "Wow! That is Kathryn Joosten at 22. That is Martin Sheen as a teenager."

C.J. instructs the President to select medical correspondent Lawrence Altman of The New York Times for the first question, although he does not. While portrayed by an actor (Alfred Hurwitz), Altman is the name of the Times' medical correspondent, who for decades reported on the health of presidents and vice presidents.

Lawrence O'Donnell, a writer and producer on The West Wing, was cast as Bartlet's father after impressing Sorkin and Schlamme during a read-through for the episode. Jane Lynch appeared as a reporter in the White House Press Room.

=== Filming locations ===
St. Andrew's School in Middletown, Delaware served as young Bartlet's boarding school. It was also the shooting location of Dead Poets Society.

During filming in the National Cathedral, Sheen as Bartlet stubbed out a cigarette on the floor, prompting the cathedral to ban filming inside the building.

=== Music ===
"The reason I think the song worked so well in it, [is] the piece was about rising above something for self, and doing something for the collective, and in The West Wing there was always a battle going on between right and wrong."

— W. G. Snuffy Walden

The episode featured the song "Brothers in Arms" by Dire Straits. The show's composer W. G. Snuffy Walden explained that Sorkin had specified the use of the song: "There was no question that this song was going to end the show which is really quite rare." Sorkin, however, explained in 2017 that he initially had some reservations about the use of the track:

Driving around in my car trying to work on the episode was really the first time I listened to the words and thought 'this is too good to be true. This is going to really work well.' And on the one hand I felt like, 'am I handing off the end of the second season of The West Wing to Dire Straits and then saying you guys take it away?' And then I thought, or rationalized, no, that this was all going to be OK.

— Aaron Sorkin, speaking to The West Wing Weekly about "Two Cathedrals"

== Reception ==
=== Critical response ===
'"Two Cathedrals" is widely regarded as one of The West Wing's best episodes and one of the greatest television episodes of all time.

- On Martin Sheen's Inside the Actors Studio episode, host James Lipton remarked that "Two Cathedrals" was "one of the best episodes in the history of American television".
- In 2009, Entertainment Weekly put the episode on its end-of-the-decade, "best-of" list, hailing it as "the show at its most brilliantly dramatic".
- In 2009, TV Guide ranked "Two Cathedrals" #40 on its list of the 100 Greatest Episodes.
- In 2018, for its 65th anniversary, TV Guide picked it as the ninth-best episode of the 21st century.

=== Awards and nominations ===
| Year | Award | Category | Nominee(s) | Result |
|---|---|---|---|---|
| 2001 | Directors Guild of America Awards | Outstanding Directing – Drama Series | Thomas Schlamme | Nominated |
| 2001 | Writers Guild of America Awards | Best Episodic Drama | Aaron Sorkin | Nominated |
| 2001 | Primetime Emmy Awards | Outstanding Lead Actor in a Drama Series | Martin Sheen | Nominated |
| 2001 | Creative Arts Emmy Award | Outstanding Single-Camera Picture Editing for a Series | Bill Johnson | Won |
| 2002 | Banff Rockie Award | Continuing Series Episode | | Nominated |
| 2002 | Humanitas Prize | 60-minute | Aaron Sorkin | Won (tied) |

== See also ==
- List of television episodes listed among the best
