= Garbage Day =

Garbage Day may refer to:

- An internet meme derived from a scene from the movie Silent Night, Deadly Night Part 2 (1987)
- Garbage Day, a 2002 short work of fiction by Wil McCarthy
- "Garbage Day #3", a 2001 song by hip hop trio KMD from Black Bastards

== See also ==
- Garbage Days Regurgitated, a 2000 EP release by punk band Sloppy Seconds
- "Garbage Day", a storyline in the science fiction comedy webtoon series Live with Yourself!
- Trash Day (disambiguation)
