= The West Wing season 1 =

The West Wing
- Season 1
- DVD box cover. Cast from left to right: Mandy, Sam, Josh, Leo, President Bartlet, Toby, C. J., Charlie and Donna
- Showrunner: Aaron Sorkin
- Starring: Rob Lowe; Moira Kelly; Dulé Hill; Allison Janney; Richard Schiff; John Spencer; Bradley Whitford; Martin Sheen
- No. of episodes: 22

Release
- Original network: NBC
- Original release: September 22, 1999 – May 17, 2000

Season chronology
- Next → Season 2

The first season of the American political drama television series The West Wing aired in the United States on NBC from September 22, 1999, to May 17, 2000, and consisted of 22 episodes.

== Cast ==
=== Main cast ===
- Rob Lowe as Sam Seaborn, Deputy White House Communications Director
- Moira Kelly as Mandy Hampton, Media Consultant
- Allison Janney as C. J. Cregg, White House Press Secretary
- Richard Schiff as Toby Ziegler, White House Communications Director
- John Spencer as Leo McGarry, White House Chief of Staff
- Bradley Whitford as Josh Lyman, White House Deputy Chief of Staff
- Martin Sheen as Josiah Bartlet, President of the United States
- Dulé Hill as Charlie Young, Personal Aide to the President

=== Recurring cast ===
- Janel Moloney as Donna Moss, assistant to Josh Lyman
- Nicole Robinson as Margaret Hooper, Assistant to Chief of Staff McGarry
- Kathryn Joosten as Dolores Landingham, President Bartlet's executive secretary
- Timothy Busfield as Danny Concannon, senior White House correspondent for The Washington Post
- Elisabeth Moss as Zoey Bartlet, the youngest of the President's three daughters
- Allison Smith as Mallory O'Brien, Leo McGarry's daughter
- John Amos as Admiral Percy Fitzwallace, Chairman of the Joint Chiefs of Staff
- Tim Matheson as John Hoynes, Vice President of the United States
- Lisa Edelstein as Laurie, law student and part-time high priced call girl Sam sleeps with in the pilot
- Jorja Fox as Gina Toscano, the Secret Service agent assigned to Zoey
- Marlee Matlin as Joey Lucas, a Democratic political consultant
- Stockard Channing as Abbey Bartlet, First Lady of the United States
- Kathleen York as Andrea Wyatt, Congresswoman from Maryland's 5th district and ex-wife of Toby Ziegler

== Plot ==
The first season, which begins in the middle of Bartlet's first year in office, is loaded with images of a West Wing "stuck in neutral" and powerless to govern. Several episodes (notably "Five Votes Down" and "Mr. Willis of Ohio") feature the White House desperately digging for a backdoor through which to pass a particular piece of legislation. This powerlessness ends in "Let Bartlet Be Bartlet" when Leo and the president finally agree to fight any battle they believe to be important, even if they are not sure they can win. The season ends with a cliffhanger assassination attempt with an ominous call over a Secret Service radio: "Who's been hit?! Who's been hit?!"

== Episodes ==
No. overall	No. in season	Title	Directed by	Written by	Original release date	Prod. code	US viewers (millions)
1	1	"Pilot"	Thomas Schlamme	Aaron Sorkin	September 22, 1999	475151	16.91
The senior staff is called back to the White House as "POTUS" (President of the United States) Jed Bartlet is injured, having ridden his bicycle into a tree. Josh Lyman, the Deputy Chief of Staff, is in trouble after a television appearance in which he makes an insulting comment to a representative of a political-connected Christian group; and Sam Seaborn, the Deputy Director of Communications, spends a night with a woman who turns out to be a prostitute. Another subplot is 1,200 Cuban boat refugees, 137 of whom arrive in Miami and request asylum, while 350 are missing in a storm and presumed dead. Bartlet speaks bluntly to the Christian group Lambs of God. Note: Emmy-nominated for Outstanding Writing and Directing for a Drama series. Also submitted as one of the package of episodes for The West Wing's first of four consecutive Outstanding Drama Series wins.
2	2	"Post Hoc, Ergo Propter Hoc"	Thomas Schlamme	Aaron Sorkin	September 29, 1999	225901	13.71
Sam jeopardizes his political future when he decides to pursue a relationship with the prostitute whom he met recently. C.J. arbitrates a disagreement between the President and the Vice President. Mandy is hired as the West Wing’s political consultant, despite Josh’s objections. President Bartlet connects with his new physician, Captain Morris Tolliver, MC, USN, whose first child was born ten days prior. The episode ends when Leo informs the President that Tolliver died while en route to a teaching hospital in Jordan when Syrian forces shot down his military aircraft on the orders of the Syrian Defense Ministry, killing all on board. Note: The episode title refers to a logical fallacy that roughly translates to "after this, therefore because of this."
3	3	"A Proportional Response"	Marc Buckland	Aaron Sorkin	October 6, 1999	225902	14.41
President Bartlet seeks vengeance after Syrian operatives shot down a transport aircraft carrying his personal physician and 57 other US military health care workers. The Joint Chiefs of Staff propose a proportional response to the attack, which involves air strikes against three low-level targets in Syria as well as one against the Syrian intelligence agency headquarters. However, President Bartlet wants a stronger response, so the Joint Chiefs draft a plan to attack a much more prominent target: the international airport in Damascus. The subtext of the story involves the President's unease around the Joint Chiefs and his worries about their respecting him having never served in the armed forces. Leo talks with Admiral Percy Fitzwallace, USN, the Chairman of the Joint Chiefs, who says that the President is doing fine. Fitzwallace later tells the President that his desired response is disproportionate, saying that he will have "doled out five thousand dollars worth of punishment for a fifty buck crime". Leo confronts President Bartlet about the disproportionate response and says that he will stand up against him if he continues to insist on it. The President confesses that he has personalized the attack because his physician, a good man with a newborn daughter, was among the victims. He then authorizes the proportional response and gives a televised speech, in which he explains the situation to the American people. Meanwhile, C.J. talks reporter Danny Concannon out of writing a story about Sam's relationship with the prostitute, and Charlie Young applies for a messenger job at the White House but impresses Josh so much that he insists on hiring Charlie as the President's personal aide and body man.
4	4	"Five Votes Down"	Michael Lehmann	Story by : Lawrence O'Donnell, Jr. and Patrick Caddell; Teleplay by : Aaron Sorkin	October 13, 1999	225903	12.32
The White House has surprisingly lost five votes for an incremental gun control bill, so the West Wing staff work during the three remaining days to regain the votes for the passage of the bill. After Leo forgets his wedding anniversary, his wife announces that she is leaving him. Josh and Toby encounter difficulties over their personal financial disclosures which are being shared publicly. The last gun bill vote is secured thanks to the Vice President who counted on being the hero of the process. Note: John Spencer submitted this episode as a nominee in the Emmy category Outstanding Supporting Actor in a Drama series.
5	5	"The Crackpots and These Women"	Anthony Drazan	Aaron Sorkin	October 20, 1999	225904	12.41
The staff members participate in Leo's "Big Block of Cheese" Day, when they meet with fringe special interest groups who normally cannot get attention from the White House. Josh receives a card from the National Security Council and later learns that he is the only senior staff member other than Leo who will receive protection in the event of a nuclear attack. Uncomfortable about his special treatment, he eventually returns the card, believing that he does not deserve to be singled out among his friends. Sam and C.J. discuss the possibility of a virus infection going rampant in the U.S., and how it could be contained without available anti-virus. Zoey Bartlet, the youngest First Daughter, arrives at the White House, and the President holds a celebratory chili supper in her honor for the members of his inner circle. Note: One of the episodes submitted as winner in the Emmy category of Outstanding Drama.
6	6	"Mr. Willis of Ohio"	Christopher Misiano	Aaron Sorkin	November 3, 1999	225905	13.37
The senior staff and the President take part in a late-night poker game inside the West Wing. A social studies teacher from Ohio finishes the term of his late wife in the United States House of Representatives while Sam tutors C.J. about the U.S. census, and the staffers seek crucial votes in favor of a bill to use statistical sampling which will be more accurate, and free funds for other uses. Zoey has an unfortunate encounter in which she needs the help of the U.S. Secret Service while at a Georgetown college bar in the company of friends from the White House. This displeases her father, who lectures her about "the nightmare scenario" – the possibility of her abduction being used against the government. Later the staff and the President sit down to another poker game while Toby watches the end of the roll call for the bill. Note: The "nightmare scenario" mentioned in this episode becomes a reality in Season 4 episodes 22 and 23, continuing through Season 5 episodes 1 and 2 when Zoey Bartlet is indeed kidnapped.
7	7	"The State Dinner"	Thomas Schlamme	Aaron Sorkin & Paul Redford	November 10, 1999	225906	13.66
The President and his senior staff deal with major problems – a hostage standoff between the FBI and a group of survivalists in Idaho, a pre-season hurricane headed toward the Atlantic Coast, and the threat of a crippling nationwide trucking strike by the Teamsters – all while preparing for a state dinner to honor the new President of Indonesia, whose behavior is distant and uncommunicative. Toby requests a favor from a senior aide to the Indonesian president; the aide not only refuses but also lectures Toby about human rights, and for being a hypocrite. At the state dinner, the First Lady, Abigail Bartlet, makes her first appearance, and Sam sees Laurie, who is working as an escort for one of the attendees. In a predictable move to evade the storm, an aircraft carrier task group of the US Navy, including two cruisers and two destroyers, gets underway from Norfolk, Virginia, and heads into the Atlantic Ocean; however, the hurricane makes a surprise course change and moves directly toward and across the naval vessels. With difficulty, the President chats via radio with a young petty officer in the radio shack aboard a small ship in the task group. Note: Stockard Channing submitted this episode as a nominee for Outstanding Supporting Actress in a Drama Series.
8	8	"Enemies"	Alan Taylor	Story by : Rick Cleveland, Lawrence O'Donnell, Jr. & Patrick Caddell; Teleplay by : Ron Osborn & Jeff Reno	November 17, 1999	225907	12.92
In an after-midnight session, the President teaches Josh about national parks. C.J. deals with a rumor that President Bartlet and Vice President Hoynes have expressed a disagreement with each other during a cabinet meeting. Sam accepts an invitation to a date with Mallory, Leo's daughter, with a condition attached; however, the plans change. Josh works long and hard to find a solution to save a wanted banking bill to which three Republican representatives have attached a harmful land-use rider.
9	9	"The Short List"	Bill D'Elia	Story by : Aaron Sorkin & Dee Dee Myers; Teleplay by : Aaron Sorkin & Patrick Caddell	November 24, 1999	225908	12.37
Josh, Sam, and Toby have spent two months vetting a strong candidate, Judge Peyton Cabot Harrison III (Ken Howard), for an open seat on the Supreme Court, and he consents to the nomination. The senior aides show jubilation, but Donna advises Josh to use cautious optimism. The retiring associate justice privately expresses displeasure of the choice to President Bartlet. Sam receives an anonymous tip and is given an old law review note with damaging material, which he reports to his colleagues and the President, who then requests data on a different candidate, Judge Roberto Mendoza (Edward James Olmos). Danny gives C.J. a goldfish. A contrarian member of Congress, seeking publicity, alleges that one-third of White House staff members regularly use illicit drugs; Josh tells Leo that the latter is the target of the campaign. After two serious meetings in the Oval Office, the President offers the nomination to Judge Mendoza, who accepts.
10	10	"In Excelsis Deo"	Alex Graves	Aaron Sorkin & Rick Cleveland	December 15, 1999	225909	14.23
While the senior staffers discuss the preparations for the Christmas celebration at the West Wing, Toby receives a telephone call from the office of the local coroner, and he responds by meeting a detective of the Metro PD at the Korean War Veterans Memorial on the National Mall to identify a body who had been found wearing a jacket that had Toby's business card in the pocket. Toby becomes emotionally and actively involved with the death of the man, who he discovers was a homeless veteran had served as a lance corporal in the US Marine Corps in the Korean War, and works to find out the man's identity and next of kin. C.J. tries to push for hate crime legislation after a deadly assault on a young gay man but receives little support amongst senior staff. Danny and C.J. continue to discuss the pros and cons of a first date. Sam and Josh, against Leo's wishes, visit Laurie to try and get dirt on Lillienfield and his allies, but she refuses to tell them anything and reminds them to behave as the good guys. Toby and Mrs. Landingham accompany the veteran's brother to his burial at Arlington National Cemetery with an honor guard. Note: Won an Emmy for Outstanding Writing in a Drama Series. Richard Schiff won the Emmy for Outstanding Supporting Actor for this episode. Also submitted as one of the package of episodes for The West Wing's first of four consecutive Outstanding Drama Series wins.
11	11	"Lord John Marbury"	Kevin Rodney Sullivan	Story by : Patrick Caddell & Lawrence O'Donnell, Jr. Teleplay by : Aaron Sorkin & Patrick Caddell	January 5, 2000	225910	13.65
US satellite surveillance detects that India has moved six warships and 300,000 ground troops against Pakistan and its occupation of Kashmir, thereby raising the possibility of a nuclear clash; the United Nations tries to get a cease-fire agreement. After receiving a dismal intelligence briefing on the situation with India, President Bartlet sends for Lord John Marbury, an eccentric former ambassador of the United Kingdom to India, whom the President describes as colorful and Leo describes as a lunatic. The ambassador from Beijing tells the President that China may enter the fight against India, the ambassador from Islamabad tells him that Pakistan will no longer tolerate any oppression of its people, and the ambassador from New Delhi tells him that India will no longer follow the directions of any other nation. However, Lord Marbury reports that the UK ambassador to the UN expects to obtain a two-week cease-fire agreement, and he agrees to stay to help. C.J. expresses displeasure about her loss of credibility with the press corps during the early hours of the crisis, and Toby apologizes. Josh obeys a subpoena to give a deposition about a recent investigation; Sam represents him on the second day, which does not go well. Mandy ruffles feathers among the senior staffers with her plan to advise a moderate Republican congressman. Zoey invites Charlie to ask her for a date; he asks for permission from her father, who first balks but later agrees and cautions him.
12	12	"He Shall, from Time to Time..."	Arlene Sanford	Aaron Sorkin	January 12, 2000	225911	13.96
After rehearsing for the State of the Union address, President Bartlet collapses in the Oval Office. An admiral and medical officer from Bethesda diagnoses it as the flu, but the First Lady, Dr. Abbey Bartlet, cancels her trip and returns to the White House to treat her husband. Skirmishes continue along the cease-fire line in Kashmir; Pakistan gives control of nuclear weapons to their field commanders. Leo faces the news media about his alcohol and Valium addiction and recovery, then faces the First Lady about the President's health; Abbey eventually admits that the President has relapsing-remitting multiple sclerosis (MS), and that a fever could be fatal. Josh and Toby continue to wrestle with the speech; C.J. watches Mallory kiss Sam, and has Danny come to her office. Lord Marbury advises the President on benevolent diplomacy, who sends India a message, which produces good results. Note: The episode title refers to Article II, Section 3 of the United States Constitution, which forms the basis of the State of the Union. Stockard Channing submitted this episode as a nominee for Outstanding Supporting Actress in a Drama Series.
13	13	"Take Out the Trash Day"	Ken Olin	Aaron Sorkin	January 26, 2000	225912	14.92
The President and staff deal with a study on sex education in public schools refuting the use of abstinence-only techniques, a forthcoming signing of a hate-crime bill, the parents of a young man killed with religious-motivated homophobic violence, and an advance man to the Vice President who has abused his position. C.J. and Danny continue to deal with their relationship. An influential man offers Leo some unwelcome advice, which he refuses. A senior member of the House of Representatives summons Josh and Sam and leans hard on them; they make a deal, which avoids a hearing on Leo and the related inquiries. Sam finds out how Lillienfield and Claypool obtained the information about Leo's addiction and treatment. Leo and the young staffer (Liza Weil) who leaked the information agree to give each other a second chance. Note: The episode title refers to a White House practice of using Fridays to release as many stories to the press as they can in the hopes that negative stories will go unnoticed.
14	14	"Take This Sabbath Day"	Thomas Schlamme	Story by : Lawrence O'Donnell, Jr. & Paul Redford and Aaron Sorkin; Teleplay by : Aaron Sorkin	February 9, 2000	225913	14.18
Late on a Friday, the Supreme Court declines to set aside the death sentence of a federal prisoner for two drug-related murders and orders the execution to take place early on the following Monday at the Federal Penitentiary at Terre Haute, Indiana. One of the appellant's public defenders is Sam's former bully from high school, who places a last-effort call to Sam in hopes of saving his client through presidential intervention. Sam answers as he unsuccessfully tries to leave the White House for a weekend of sailing, and the two then meet in person. On Saturday morning, President Bartlet returns from Stockholm; Donna finds Josh asleep and hungover in his office after a bachelor party. Sam calls Toby at his temple, while his rabbi presents a sermon against capital punishment, as Sam's classmate found the rabbi and arranged for him to preach to Toby. Meanwhile, Josephine “Joey” Lucas (Marlee Matlin), the deaf campaign manager for a Democratic House candidate from Southern California, using American Sign Language through her interpreter Kenny, aggressively asks Josh why the White House has caused the Democratic National Committee to reduce the funding for her campaign, and then demands to meet the President. When Josh assures her that there is no way for her to meet the President, he appears at Josh's door and gives Joey a tour of the Oval Office. The President calls the Pope and sends for the parish priest (Karl Malden, in his final acting role) whom he knew as a boy; he also discusses the death penalty separately with Charlie and with Joey, who is a Quaker. As Joey and Kenny leave their hotel to return to California, Josh, at the request of the President, offers Joey an apology and a suggestion. The President continues to agonize over his decision and makes a Confession to the priest. Note: Submitted as one of the package of episodes for The West Wing's first of four consecutive Outstanding Drama Series wins
15	15	"Celestial Navigation"	Christopher Misiano	Story by : Dee Dee Myers & Lawrence O'Donnell, Jr. Teleplay by : Aaron Sorkin	February 16, 2000	225914	13.48
Josh is interviewed before a group of college students at Georgetown about a supposedly typical day at the White House. Josh's remarks, including a candid description of his own mistakes, showcases a difficult and challenging day when C.J. has urgent dental surgery and Josh conducts the press briefing in her place with disastrous results, while Sam learns that Judge Mendoza—the nominee to become the next associate justice of the Supreme Court—has been arrested in Connecticut on charges of drunk driving, resisting arrest, and disorderly conduct. Sam, having vetted Mendoza, knows the judge cannot consume alcohol because of a liver condition, and heads to Connecticut with Toby. The two get lost along the way in a rental car, but eventually arrive at the small-town police station, where they work out the delicate situation. Note: Allison Janney won the Emmy for Outstanding Supporting Actress in a Drama Series with this episode submission. Also submitted as one of the package of episodes for The West Wing's first of four consecutive Outstanding Drama Series wins.
16	16	"20 Hours in L.A."	Alan Taylor	Aaron Sorkin	February 23, 2000	225915	12.41
At 3 a.m. aboard Air Force One, President Bartlet, Josh, Toby, C.J., Donna, Zoey, Charlie, and others leave Andrews AFB for a grueling 24-hour trip to Los Angeles. The President expresses concern about a pending 50-50 vote on a Senate bill about a tax credit for the production of ethanol as a fuel, and meets Gina Toscano (Jorja Fox), the Secret Service agent assigned to Zoey. The agenda, filling the day and evening, includes a debate on a proposed amendment to the Constitution to prohibit burning the national flag, a town-hall meeting on school vouchers, and a celebrity-packed fundraising dinner at the home of Ted Marcus (Bob Balaban), the president of a film studio. Ted learns that a conservative congressman has introduced a bill in the House to ban gays from the armed forces and that the White House does not actively oppose the bill, so Marcus threatens to cancel the fundraising event. Josh arranges ten minutes for Marcus and the President alone, and the party proceeds. Joey Lucas attends and explains some interesting numbers to Josh, Sam, Toby, and C.J. Leo, back in Washington, asks the Vice President to break the tie in the Senate in favor of the bill, but the Vice President prefers not to do so because of personal, political, and ideological reasons; however, Sam and Leo arrange for three reluctant senators to vote "nay", thus letting the Vice President off the hook. Guest stars Jay Leno and David Hasselhoff as guests at the fundraising party.
17	17	"The White House Pro-Am"	Ken Olin	Lawrence O'Donnell, Jr. & Paul Redford and Aaron Sorkin	March 22, 2000	225916	15.76
The First Lady appears on television on behalf of the Children's Crusade to raise awareness about child slavery, but her efforts are soon overshadowed when the Chairman of the Federal Reserve Board of Governors dies. Leo, to settle the uncertainty in the investment markets, urges the President to announce a successor, but the President decides takes time to make sure, although, according to a leak, the First Lady has expressed her preference, who also happens to be a former boyfriend. Josh and Toby court additional votes in the Congress to run up the score on the vote on a global trade agreement, and a congresswoman gives Sam a courtesy advance notice of a forthcoming announcement about her rider on the exploitation of child labor, which Sam expects to "blow the vote out of the water". Sam speaks with the First Lady, who negotiates for the withdrawal of the rider. The First Lady reveals who leaked her preference and the Bartlets have what they call their first Oval Office fight, but they quickly make up. The White House has received death threats and other hate mail from white supremacists about the relationship between Zoey and Charlie, who argue about their plans for Friday night; later, Charlie shows up at Zoey's dorm room with flowers, other gifts, and an apology. Note: Submitted as one of the package of episodes for The West Wing's first of four consecutive Outstanding Drama Series wins.
18	18	"Six Meetings Before Lunch"	Clark Johnson	Aaron Sorkin	April 5, 2000	225917	14.24
The Senate confirms President Bartlet's nomination of Judge Mendoza to the Supreme Court, prompting the West Wing staff to celebrate and C.J. to lip-sync to "The Jackal". The next day, however, ushers in a myriad of problems that bring the senior staff quickly back to Earth. Zoey attends a frat party which was the location of a Metro Police drug bust and subsequent arrest of the son of a major fundraiser for the Democrats after her departure. A reporter for a conservative newspaper tries to cause problems while C.J. and others try to minimize it as a non-story, which becomes more of a struggle when C.J. discovers that Zoey did not tell her the whole truth. C.J.'s morning meetings are with Charlie, Danny, Zoe, Gina, Sam, and the President. Mallory, Leo's daughter, quarrels with Sam about school vouchers. Mandy asks Toby for help in getting a replacement panda from the Chinese government and gets him to help her to cause pain for Josh. Meanwhile, due to an objection by a member of the Senate Judiciary Committee, Josh has a long and vigorous discussion about reparations (of $1.7 trillion) for slavery with a candidate for an appointment to the post of the Assistant Attorney General for Civil Rights.
19	19	"Let Bartlet Be Bartlet"	Laura Innes	Story by : Peter Parnell and Patrick Caddell; Teleplay by : Aaron Sorkin	April 26, 2000	225918	13.97
When the weather suddenly changes just before a speech by President Bartlet, Sam forgets to change the introductory remarks, thus creating a humorous and embarrassing moment. Two members of the Federal Election Commission have resigned, so the staff members start preparing for new appointments; Josh meets with the Senate leadership from both parties, but the conversation does not go well. Both the staff and the press hear a rumor about the circulation of an unknown memo; Mandy volunteers to C.J. that she wrote the memo when she worked for Sen. Russell, and that it outlines both the weaknesses of the Bartlet administration and a strategy to defeat President Bartlet for the nomination for reelection. C.J. demands a copy immediately and Mandy complies. After reading it, C.J. approaches Toby, who shares it with Josh, who comments that their second year has not gone better than their first. Sam and Toby meet with a group of military officers about a recommendation to the President on the service of gays in the armed forces, but that discussion too does not go well; Admiral Fitzwallace, the Chairman of the Joint Chiefs, pops in and offers his advice; eventually the meeting ends without achieving anything. Mrs. Landingham encourages the President to improve his eating choices. C.J. learns which reporter has the damaging memo, and she hears that a story will appear in print the next morning. Margaret has computer and email problems, and Leo reads the memo. The President reads it, then he and Leo have a heart-to-heart chat, after which Leo tells the senior staffers that they will start raising the level of public debate in the nation and let that be their legacy even if they do lose some political battles; they agree that they serve at the pleasure of the President, and Leo tells them to get into the game. Note: John Spencer submitted this episode as a nominee for Outstanding Supporting Actor in a Drama series. Also submitted as one of the package of episodes for The West Wing's first of four consecutive Outstanding Drama Series wins.
20	20	"Mandatory Minimums"	Robert Berlinger	Aaron Sorkin	May 3, 2000	225919	12.89
During a speech at an awards dinner, President Bartlet announces his nomination of one Democrat and one Republican, each known to favor reforms, to fill two vacant seats on the Federal Election Commission. A powerful Republican senator wages battle with the West Wing staff. Leo cautions the senior staffers not to make mistakes this week, and C.J. tells Mandy that Leo prefers that Mandy stay out of his way due to her involvement in the leaked memo, while she continues to undercut Danny Concannon for his having reported on Mandy's opposition research memo last week. Leo arranges for Toby and his ex-wife, Andrea "Andy" Wyatt, a member of the House of Representatives, to meet and discuss legislative matters, and the two eventually reach an agreement against minimum sentencing for drug users. Al Kiefer, Joey Lucas, and Kenny arrive from California to help with the confirmation of the nominees. Josh and Toby tell Sam that his relationship with Laurie has become known to one of his political enemies. The senior staff confer with the President in his bedroom at midnight with positive and constructive results; he firmly tells them that any unofficial boycotts of either Danny or Mandy are finished, and says they all did very well in their jobs today.
21	21	"Lies, Damn Lies and Statistics"	Don Scardino	Aaron Sorkin	May 10, 2000	225920	14.33
After last-minute quibbling over the wording of several questions, the senior staff start a nationwide telephone poll to measure the job-approval rating of the administration. The majority of the staff think the poll will show a decrease in the rating, but C.J. believes the numbers will go up; however, when the President asks Leo what the senior staff thinks the results will be, Leo omits C.J.'s prediction, which hurts her when she finds out and leads her to speak up for herself and her opinions. Leo gives a snow job to the lone reform-minded member of the Federal Election Commission. With regret, Sam explains to Laurie that he cannot attend her graduation from law school. He later goes against Leo's orders and presents her a gift outside her friend's apartment that night, but someone takes a photograph of the encounter, which was a set-up organized by Laurie's friend, and it reaches the attention of President Bartlet. The President accepts a round-robin plan to change several US ambassadors that will meet two goals: getting the campaign finance reform moves on the FEC completed successfully, and forcing out the dishonest, unlikable Ambassador to Bulgaria. C.J. spars with the press corps about treatment, rehabilitation, and mandatory minimum sentences for convicted drug users. The President makes a deal seeking reform on soft-money political contributions. Eventually C.J. receives the results of the poll, goes to the Oval Office, and presents them to the President. Note: Allison Janney won the Emmy for Outstanding Supporting Actress in a Drama Series with this episode submission.
22	22	"What Kind of Day Has It Been"	Thomas Schlamme	Aaron Sorkin	May 17, 2000	225921	13.30
Iraqi ground forces, using a surface-to-air missile, shoot down an F-117 Nighthawk of the US Air Force during a routine three-hour patrol of a no-fly zone; the pilot, a 26-year-old captain, survives, but Iraqis are only 10 miles away. President Bartlet orders a military rescue immediately. The staff learns that the Space Shuttle Columbia has incurred a mechanical problem and a resulting delay in its landing, and that Toby's brother is a payload specialist aboard the flight. Later, the officials learn that the rescue of the downed pilot has succeeded. The President, Zoey, and the senior staff go to a museum in Rosslyn, in the Virginia suburbs of Washington, where the President speaks in a town-hall meeting, during which Josh signals him that the problem with the shuttle has been resolved. Afterward, as the group returns to the motorcade, Zoey's Secret Service agent Gina Toscano sees something, but is unable to piece it together before two unknown concealed gunmen begin shooting. The screen goes to black, leaving the fate of the President and senior staff unknown. Note: Also submitted as one of the package of episodes for The West Wing's first of four consecutive Outstanding Drama Series wins.

== Reception ==
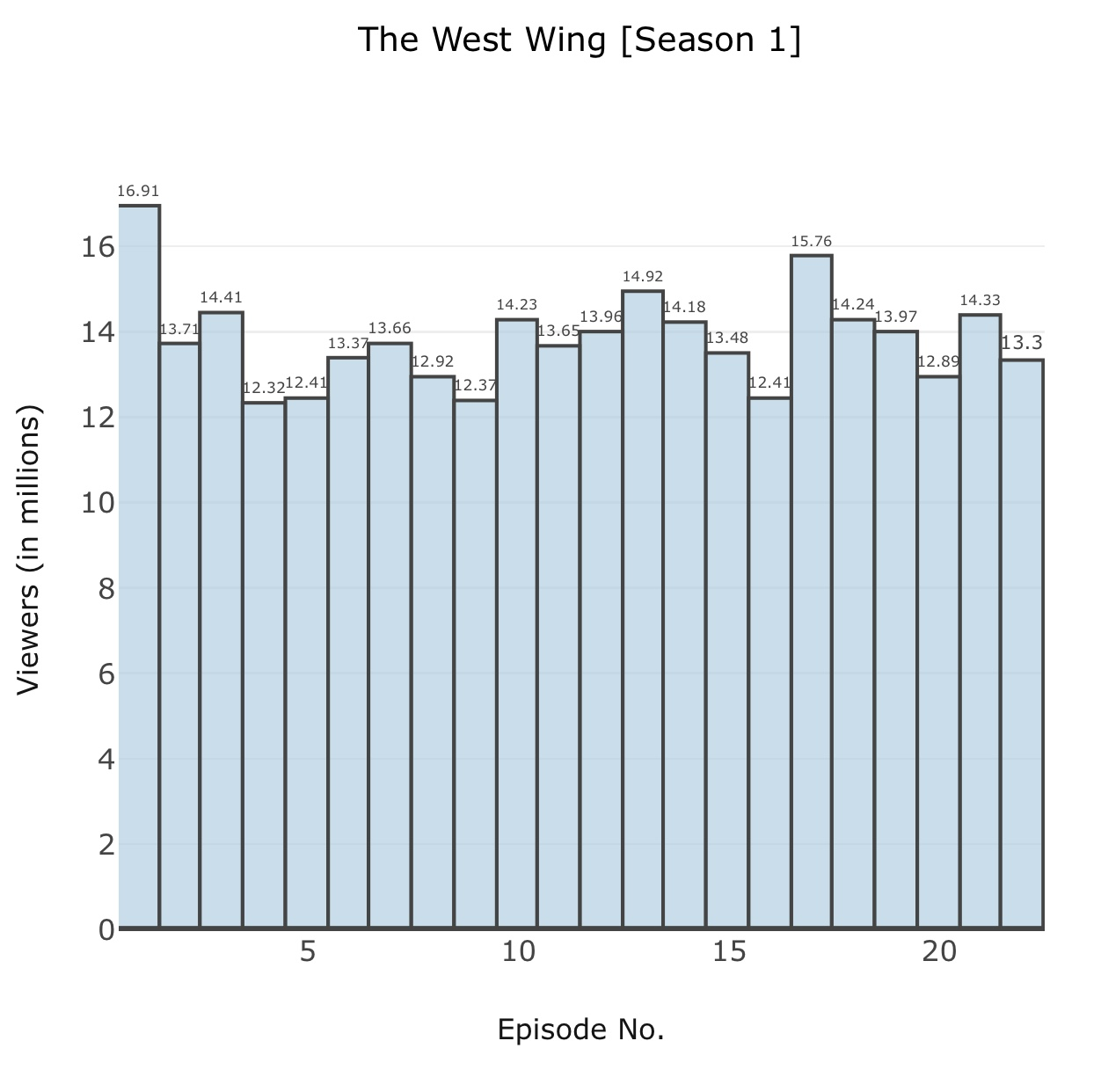
U.S. viewers (in millions) per episode

=== Critical response ===
The first season of The West Wing received positive reviews, and scored a Metacritic rating of 79 out of 100, based on 23 reviews. On Rotten Tomatoes, the season has an approval rating of 96% with an average score of 8.3 out of 10 based on 46 reviews. The website's critical consensus reads, "The West Wing is a gripping fantasy of lawmakers and government operatives looking to make a difference, presenting an idealized vision of politicking that audiences can strive toward."

=== Accolades ===
The first season received 18 Emmy Award nominations for the 52nd Primetime Emmy Awards, winning a total of 9 awards. It won for Outstanding Drama Series, Outstanding Supporting Actor in a Drama Series (Richard Schiff), Outstanding Supporting Actress in a Drama Series (Allison Janney), Outstanding Writing for a Drama Series (Aaron Sorkin and Rick Cleveland for "In Excelsis Deo"), Outstanding Directing for a Drama Series (Thomas Schlamme for "Pilot"), Outstanding Main Title Theme Music (W. G. Snuffy Walden), Outstanding Cinematography for a Single Camera Series (Thomas Del Ruth), Outstanding Art Direction for a Single Camera Series, and Outstanding Casting for a Drama Series. Notable nominations included Martin Sheen for Outstanding Lead Actor in a Drama Series, John Spencer for Outstanding Supporting Actor in a Drama Series, Stockard Channing for Outstanding Supporting Actress in a Drama Series, and Aaron Sorkin for Outstanding Writing for a Drama Series for "Pilot".

Thomas Del Ruth received a nomination from the American Society of Cinematographers for the pilot episode.
