= Mrs. Landingham =

American TV character, created 1999

- The West Wing character
- Mrs. Landingham talks to Josiah Bartlet about his re-election in "Two Cathedrals"
- First appearance: "Pilot"
- Last appearance: "Debate Camp"
- Portrayed by: Kathryn Joosten; Kirsten Nelson

In-universe information
- Full name: Delores Landingham
- Title: Personal secretary to the president
- Children: Andrew Landingham (deceased); Simon Landingham (deceased)

Mrs. Delores Landingham, played by Kathryn Joosten and Kirsten Nelson, is the fictional personal secretary for the President of the United States in the first two seasons of American serial political drama The West Wing. At the end of the second season, she was killed in the episode "18th and Potomac", but reappeared for multiple flashbacks afterwards. Mrs. Landingham is considered a beloved character whose influence on politicians has continued through subsequent decades.

== Character role ==
On The West Wing, Mrs. Dolores Landingham is the personal secretary of Josiah Bartlet, the fictional president of the United States played by Martin Sheen. Having worked as the school secretary for Bartlet's father – headmaster of his private high school in New Hampshire – she has known Jed since he was a schoolboy, going on to work for him as secretary while he was the governor of New Hampshire, and has a rare familiarity with Bartlet that few other characters can match. As Bartlet first knew her as "Mrs. Landingham", he continued to address her this way and the other White House staff followed his example.

In the second-season penultimate episode "18th and Potomac", she is killed in a car crash at a junction — while driving back to the White House in her brand new car from the car dealership to let Bartlet "kick the tires" — by a drunk driver. In the next episode and season finale, "Two Cathedrals", Mrs. Landingham is shown in flashbacks meeting Jed Bartlet while he was in high school in the late-1950s, and also appears in the Oval Office to talk to him a final time during his crisis of faith. The character appears in 30 of the series' 154 episodes, with her last appearance occurring in a season-four flashback in "Debate Camp".

A key moment for Mrs. Landingham's character comes in the first-season episode "In Excelsis Deo". In the episode, set around Christmas, Charlie Young notices that Mrs. Landingham seems depressed despite the festive atmosphere. Mrs. Landingham explains that she always feels sad at the holiday season, revealing that her two sons, Andrew and Simon, were drafted into the Vietnam War. Mrs. Landingham and the boys' father unsuccessfully tried to convince them not to go, and instead take a deferment to finish medical school; they were killed by enemy fire on December 24, 1970. "It's hard when that happens so far away, you know," says Mrs. Landingham, "because with the noises and the shooting, they had to be so scared. It's hard not to think that right then, they needed their mother." Later in the episode, Mrs. Landingham accompanies Toby Ziegler to a military funeral arranged for a homeless veteran. Martin Sheen later said that he was supposed to have been present in the scene as well, but it was changed to not overshadow Ziegler and Mrs. Landingham, commenting that the two "were deeply affected by the incident: a woman who has lost two sons and a man who gave this guy clothes to keep warm". Joosten said that the scene was a high point of her time on the show.

Mrs. Landingham sometimes serves as Bartlet's conscience, highlighted in season two finale episode, "Two Cathedrals", following her death in "18th and Potomac". She guides Bartlet on how to grapple with moral issues starting with a flashback of her meeting Bartlet when he was in high school. She repeatedly asks Jed to address a gender pay gap in the school's faculty, as his father was the headmaster. When asked why she is doing this, she asserts her role as the older sister Jed needed to set him straight, telling him:

"Look, if you think we're wrong … then I respect that. But if you think we're right, and you won't speak up because you can't be bothered, then God, Jed, I don't even want to know ya."

Later, in the show's present moment, appearing as his conscience, Mrs. Landingham has a conversation with Bartlet in the Oval Office while a thunderstorm rages — reflecting his inner turmoil — reminding him that there is always an action he can take regardless of the challenges he faces as he must give a press conference following an announcement that he has concealed a diagnosis of multiple sclerosis from the public. The President is reconsidering whether he should run for re-election, and Mrs. Landingham asks the President to list all of the problems still facing American society, and in an echo of her earlier words, tells him that:

"You know, if you don't want to run for a second term, I respect that. But if you don't run because you think it's too hard, or you think you're going to lose, then God, Jed, I don't even wanna know ya."

Mrs. Landingham provided other characters on The West Wing with guidance rather than playing a central political role, and was known for her playful banter. Her influence over the President was particularly noted, with Steve Heisler of The A.V. Club commenting that Mrs. Landingham "held a unique kind of influence over the President of the United States, yet had zero ego about it". Mrs. Landingham was described by Heisler as humble, hard-working, relentlessly moral, and "important in all the ways The West Wing rarely talks about, yet in all the ways The West Wing excels". With a show as idealized as The West Wing, Mrs. Landingham sometimes reminded the characters "who they should be working for". Kathryn Joosten is quoted in the Los Angeles Times as saying that Mrs. Landingham "represented for a lot of people the voice of the little people".

== Development ==
Mrs. Landingham was played by Kathryn Joosten, while Kirsten Nelson played a younger Mrs. Landingham in the flashback scenes of "Two Cathedrals". Joosten said that she drew from previous experience spending time with an executive assistant at a technology company in Pasadena, commenting that "she was efficient; she was proven. But she called her boss by her first name, and I couldn't do that". Joosten also recalled a scene in which her character was to remind a few women secretaries who were gossiping that they "work for some very important men here". Joosten, who remarked that the line "pissed [her] off", persuaded the writers to change "men" to "people".

=== Conclusion ===
While at a charity dinner with the cast and crew of The West Wing, Joosten told series creator Aaron Sorkin that she had been approached for a regular role in a TV series that was shooting its pilot. This inadvertently inspired Sorkin to create serious drama for the Bartlet character by suddenly killing off his lifelong family friend and secretary, in a scene Heisler described as "perfectly gut-wrenching". The showrunner planned it as a dramatic penultimate twist for the second season, leading the President to rail against his god in "Two Cathedrals" (2001), pacing and smoking throughout Washington National Cathedral — a season finale for which Sheen was "the overwhelming favorite to win an Emmy [Award]". The following June, Joosten told the Los Angeles Times that "the publicity resulting from Mrs. Landingham’s untimely demise has been good for me personally".

== Reception ==
The Los Angeles Times wrote that Mrs. Landingham's tendency to ground characters in an otherwise idealized show allowed the audience to identify themselves—or their mothers—with the sexagenarian presidential secretary. In The Prime-Time Presidency: The West Wing and U.S. Nationalism, Shawn Parry-Giles argues that Mrs. Landingham embodies a "republican mother", willing to sacrifice her children for the nation and guide Jed Bartlet towards his potential as a leader. In a 2020 Entertainment Weekly reunion of cast and crew on The West Wing, special recognition was given to Joosten; Sorkin praised the compassion Joosten played Mrs. Landingham with, while Rob Lowe and Richard Schiff called her performance in "In Excelsis Deo" the best in the show's seven-season run. That same year, Showbiz Cheat Sheet called Mrs. Landingham "a beloved part of" The West Wing, and in 2021, the Waco Tribune-Herald described her as "a sentimental favorite" character from the series.

=== Legacy ===
After the character was killed off in 2001, the California State Assembly observed a moment of silence in honor of Mrs. Landingham, with Democratic Assemblyman Kevin Shelley adjourning that body in memory of "a great American" who contributed to the nation in ways "too numerous to count". Evelyn Nieves, writing for The New York Times, said this action showed that the California legislature was not "completely preoccupied with the energy crisis".

In 2014, The Atlantic placed Mrs. Landingham as 13th on their ranking of 114 characters from The West Wing, commenting that she had few, but meaningful, interactions with Leo McGarry, Charlie Young, and the President. In 2015, the United States' General Services Administration released a Slack bot named "Mrs. Landingham" to ease new hires through their onboarding; the many fans of The West Wing at 18F felt it right to "[bring] back the beloved character".

In 2021, then Lord Chancellor and Justice Secretary Sir Robert Buckland, the British Member of Parliament for South Swindon, adopted a grey tabby cat from Cats Protection and named her Mrs. Landingham.

== Works cited ==
- Norman, Jason (2017). Before the Camera Rolled. BearManor Media. ISBN 978-1629331225.
- Rollins, Peter C. (2003). The Columbia Companion to American History on Film. Columbia University Press. ISBN 0231112238.
- Sachleben, Mark; Yenerall, Kevan M. (2004). Seeing the Bigger Picture. Lang. ISBN 0820462489.
- Parry-Giles, Shawn J. (2010). The Prime-Time Presidency: The West Wing and U.S. Nationalism. University of Illinois Press. ISBN 9780252092091.
