= Let Bartlet Be Bartlet =

- The West Wing episode
- Episode no.: Season 1 Episode 19
- Directed by: Laura Innes
- Story by: Peter Parnell; Patrick Caddell
- Teleplay by: Aaron Sorkin
- Production code: 225918
- Original air date: April 26, 2000

Guest appearances
- John Amos as Admiral Percy Fitzwallace; Timothy Busfield as Danny Concannon; Janel Moloney as Donna Moss; Paul Provenza as Steve Onorato; Renee Estevez as Nancy; Richard Penn as Blakely; Aaron Lustig as Senate Aide; James DuMont as Major Thompson; David Brisbin as Ken; Andy Buckley

Episode chronology
← Previous "Six Meetings Before Lunch"	Next → "Mandatory Minimums"
- The West Wing season 1

"Let Bartlet Be Bartlet" is the 19th episode of The West Wing and first aired on NBC on April 26, 2000. In the episode, a White House insider writes a memo that attacks President Bartlet for his ineffectiveness in making bold decisions due to his timid nature.

The series creators subsequently used the title phrase, "Let Bartlet be Bartlet," as a recurring rallying cry in the series. In addition, political commentators took the same lesson from the episode and have applied it since 2001 to politicians in the United States, the United Kingdom, Australia, and other countries.

== Plot ==
When a damaging memo which is critical of the President is discovered, the White House press cover it with zest, much to CJ's dismay. Later it is revealed that Mandy wrote it when she was working for Lloyd Russell. Sam, Toby and Josh are involved in a series of meetings which go nowhere and result in nothing; Sam knows no progress is possible on getting a policy in place so that gays and lesbians can openly serve in the military; Josh confronts a group of Republican Congressional staffers who threaten him with poison-pill legislation if he even thinks about supporting campaign finance reformers for two newly opened Federal Election Commission seats; and Toby tells Leo that they have had only one victory in office and that was putting Judge Mendoza on the Supreme Court. The staffers and the President feel listless and ineffectual in their jobs, and worry that they will be unable to achieve anything meaningful due to the constraints of the political system.

The memo and news coverage of how Bartlet too often compromises his positions to placate his opponents and avoid controversy result in Bartlet's popularity going down in the polls. On seeing Bartlet's job approval rating dropping five points in a week to 42 percent, the staff comes to realize that the Bartlet administration has been ineffective because it has been too timid and failed to make bold decisions, focusing instead on the exigencies of politics. Finally, Leo confronts President Bartlet about his timidity, challenging him to be himself and to take the staff "off the leash." – in other words, he seeks to "Let Bartlet be Bartlet". The President and his staff resolve to act boldly and "raise the level of public debate" in America by moving forward with a more liberal agenda.

== History ==
The episode was directed by Laura Innes, who was known for portraying Dr. Kerry Weaver on the NBC television series ER and had previously directed the ER sixth season episode "Be Still My Heart". In a May 2000 interview with TV Guide Online, Martin Sheen admitted to not knowing much about Innes when he first learned that she would be directing the episode, but that evening, when his wife looked at the call sheets, she commented that "Laura was the best thing on ER, so he had better behave."

In the episode, the characters reaffirm their commitment to the president after a White House insider wrote a memo attacking the president, leading to the popularizing of the sound bite: "I serve at the pleasure of the president." In addition, the episode captured the series' effort to show how politics and government could work in Washington D.C., and the series creators subsequently used the title phrase, "Let Bartlet be Bartlet," as a recurring theme in the series. Yet, in episodes that followed "Let Bartlet Be Bartlet," the fictional staff's success in pursuing agendas more aggressively was mixed at best. For example, in season 2, their attempt to retake control of Congress fell short. In commenting on the episode and its application to real life, television writer R. D. Heldenfels noted in January 2001:

But there's a reason life in "The West Wing" can seem to be fouled up. It's that we're seeing these officials in a way the real politicians try never to let us see them. A regular element of the series is keeping news media from knowing what is really going on. We don't usually get a glimpse of a real-life White House like this until disgruntled staffers start dishing with the press. Viewers forgive the "West Wing" characters their foibles because, at least as series creator Sorkin tells it, their hearts are pure. They mean well. They want to do right. Somewhere in every heart beats a tiny hope that real political operatives want the same thing. But if you think they'd be successful in the real world, keep in mind that they often lose in the fictional one.

The episode's title is a reference to the parallel phrase "Let Reagan be Reagan," used by conservative supporters of Ronald Reagan in the 1980s.

The episode influenced political commentators, who took the 'let the politician be himself/politicians must remain true to themselves' lesson and applied it to politicians including US Vice President Al Gore in 2000, Canadian health minister Allan Rock in 2001, Quebec premier Jean Charest in 2004, US presidential candidate John Kerry in 2004, and US president Barack Obama twice in 2009, and once in 2011. Commentators additionally applied the lesson to politicians including New York City mayor Michael Bloomberg in 2009, Prime Minister of Australia Julia Gillard twice in 2010, which prompted other news reporters to publish their thoughts to that topic and make it a top ten discussion of the week in Australia, British Labour leader Ed Miliband in 2011, and Scottish politician Johann Lamont in 2011.
