= Take Out the Trash Day =

- The West Wing episode
- Episode no.: Season 1 Episode 13
- Directed by: Ken Olin
- Written by: Aaron Sorkin
- Cinematography by: Thomas Del Ruth
- Editing by: Tina Hirsch
- Production code: 225912
- Original air date: January 26, 2000
- Running time: 41 minutes

Episode chronology
← Previous "He Shall, from Time to Time..."	Next → "Take This Sabbath Day"
- The West Wing season 1

"Take Out the Trash Day" is the thirteenth episode of the first season of The West Wing. It originally aired on January 26, 2000. The episode sees characters finalize a hate crime bill and was inspired by the murder of Matthew Shepard. It made prominent the phrase of the same name. Vulture.com ranked the episode number 141 in a list of all 150 episodes. The Daily Beast ranked the episode number 102 in a similar list.
