= Mandy Hampton =

American TV character, created 1999

- The West Wing character
- Moira Kelly as Madeline Hampton
- First appearance: "Pilot" (episode 1.01)
- Last appearance: "What Kind of Day Has It Been" (episode 1.22)
- Created by: Aaron Sorkin
- Portrayed by: Moira Kelly

In-universe information
- Nickname: Mandy
- Gender: Female
- Title(s): Madeline Hampton, Ph.D.
- Occupation: White House media director (Bartlet administration; season 1)
- Nationality: American

Madeline "Mandy" Hampton is a fictional character from the American serial drama The West Wing, portrayed by Moira Kelly. She is the White House media director during the first season of the show and the former girlfriend of Deputy White House Chief of Staff Josh Lyman, with whom she often clashes. A savvy political strategist and no-nonsense negotiator, the character is said to have been based on Mandy Grunwald, a real-life Democratic political consultant and media adviser who worked on the presidential campaigns for both Bill Clinton and Hillary Clinton. Moira Kelly said of her character, "She's a fighter in a difficult business and has a lot of strength."

Although Kelly was a primary cast member during the first season, Mandy is featured less frequently as the season progressed; Aaron Sorkin said early on in Season 1 that he and Kelly had agreed that the character was not working out and that she would have less of a focus because she would not be returning for Season 2.

== Storyline ==
Mandy Hampton is a political consultant who left a high-paying and prestigious public relations firm to work for top politicians in the public sphere. Extremely ambitious, Mandy has a reputation as a savvy political strategist and no-nonsense negotiator. She has a bachelor's degree in art history, a master's degree in communications, and a Ph.D. in political science. Mandy starts out the show as an advisor to Democratic Senator Lloyd Russell, a political challenger to President Josiah Bartlet who opposes many of his policies. She is also dating the senator, which angers Deputy White House Chief of Staff Josh Lyman, who used to date her himself.

In the second episode of Season 1, "Post Hoc, Ergo Propter Hoc", Mandy leaves the employ of the senator, and stops dating him, when he defies her wishes and tables a bill in committee for which she planned to fight vigorously. As a result, she is hired as a media consultant for Bartlet, much to Josh's chagrin. In her new capacity, she reports directly to him and to Toby Ziegler, the White House communications director.

Before leaving Russell's employment, Mandy writes a memo to him deeply critical of Bartlet's administration. This memo eventually becomes public, and an embarrassment for the Bartlet administration in the episode "Let Bartlet Be Bartlet", leading to her being cut out of the policymaking loop for a while until the President orders his senior staff to let her out of the doghouse. In "The State Dinner", when the Federal Bureau of Investigation wants to use force to take down a militia involved in a hostage situation, Mandy strongly urges the President to exhaust all peaceful solutions first, despite Josh's advice to the contrary. Mandy argues "the greatest threat to democracy" is not "the nuts" but rather "the unbridled power of the state over its citizens." However, the situation ends poorly when the hostage-takers shoot and critically injure an FBI mediator and the FBI then ends the standoff by force, making Mandy physically sickened by the events.

== Departure ==
The character appeared only in the first season, and her appearances became sporadic as the episodes progressed. She departed the show without plot explanation after the first season ended. Series creator Aaron Sorkin said that the character was not working out and that the decision for Moira Kelly's departure from the show was amicable:

"Moira is a terrific actress, but we just weren't the right thing for her. She expressed that she felt the same way, and as a result, story lines hadn't been invested in that character, because we knew that at the end of the year, we'd be shaking hands and parting company."

The ensemble nature of the cast contributed toward making it difficult to focus adequately on the character. When the season 1 finale, "What Kind of Day Has It Been", featured a cliff-hanger ending with an unknown character getting shot, many fans speculated it would be Mandy Hampton due to the character's ongoing departure. The St. Petersburg Times quoted an unnamed West Wing writer as suggesting that actors with two-year contracts are the most likely to have been shot, which the newspaper said suggests it could be Mandy due to her pending departure. However, the newspaper also suggested that could be a red herring since it was not clear that Mandy was even present in the scene when the shots were fired. The shooting victims ultimately turned out to be Josh Lyman and President Bartlet.

Owing to Mandy's unexplained departure, "going to Mandyville" became a euphemism among West Wing fans; it was used for any character being removed from a show with no justification.

Sorkin originally planned to reintroduce Mandy in the second-season episode "The War at Home", as the campaign operator of junior senator and environmentalist Seth Gilette, played by Ed Begley Jr. However, that appearance never happened.

== Themes ==
Mandy Hampton has been cited in arguments that, particularly in the first season, the series placed its female characters in largely marginalized roles while the male characters occupied most of the powerful positions. They pointed out that even Mandy, who held a relatively important position as political consultant, was not predominantly featured in major storylines and departed from the show quickly. In response, authors Peter C. Rollins and John E. O'Connor, who published a book about the series, wrote, "This televised representation may not be so much the result of a conscious or even unconscious bias on the part of the scriptwriters but a reflection of Washington reality." In an article for the Straits Times, writer Richard Feinberg acknowledged most of the important characters in the show were white males but pointed to "very smart women" characters like Mandy as evidence that the show included a fair mix.

== See also ==
- List of characters on The West Wing
- List of The West Wing episodes
