= Kathryn Joosten =

American actress (1939–2012)

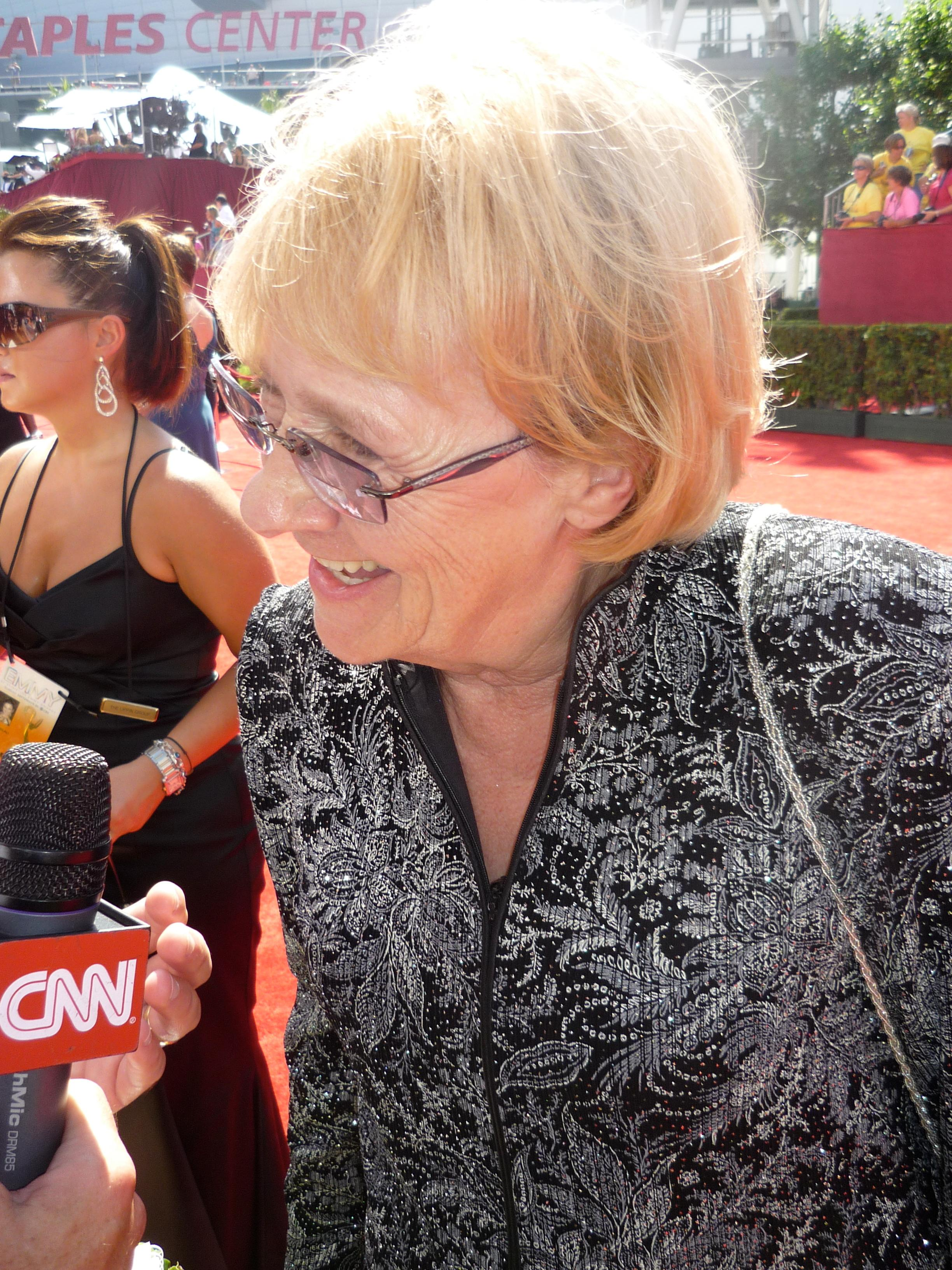
- Joosten at the 61st Primetime Emmy Awards in 2009
- Born: Kathryn Rausch; December 20, 1939; Chicago, Illinois, U.S.
- Died: June 2, 2012 (aged 72); Westlake Village, California, U.S.
- Occupation: Actress
- Years active: 1982–2012
- Known for: Karen McCluskey, Delores Landingham
- Television: Desperate Housewives, The West Wing
- Children: 2
- Awards: Primetime Emmy Awards (2005, 2008)

Kathryn Joosten (née Rausch; December 20, 1939 – June 2, 2012) was an American actress. Her best known roles include Delores Landingham on NBC's The West Wing from 1999 to 2002 and Karen McCluskey on ABC's Desperate Housewives from 2005 to 2012, for which she won two Primetime Emmy Awards in 2005 and 2008.

== Early life ==
Joosten was born Kathryn Rausch in Chicago, Illinois, to Dutch-German parents. Her first career was as a psychiatric nurse at Michael Reese Hospital in Chicago, living in nearby Lake Forest, Illinois, where she married a psychiatrist and raised two sons. Following her 1980 divorce, she began acting in community theater in 1982, at age 42.

== Career ==
In 1992, aged 53, she was hired as a street performer working for the Disney-MGM Studios theme park at Walt Disney World in Orlando, Florida. In 1995, she moved to Hollywood, where she took guest roles in television series such as Roseanne, Home Improvement, Picket Fences, Murphy Brown, ER, Seinfeld, Frasier, Just Shoot Me!, Buffy the Vampire Slayer, Dharma & Greg, Las Vegas and The Drew Carey Show. In a 1997 episode of Frasier, "Roz's Turn", Joosten appeared as Vera, the mother and personal secretary of Frasier's agent Bebe Glazer, played by Harriet Sansom Harris. The pair later reunited to play opposite neighbors in Desperate Housewives.

In 1999, Joosten took the role of Mrs. Landingham, personal secretary to President Josiah Bartlet (played by Martin Sheen) in The West Wing. Joosten played the role for two seasons, until her character's death in a car crash in 2001, and returned to the show twice more in flashback appearances. Her role on The West Wing gave her an entrance into more significant guest roles on notable television series.

After 2001, she appeared in such shows as Scrubs (appearing in "My Old Lady", which won a Humanitas Prize, as well as reappearing in two later episodes), My Name Is Earl, Spin City, The X-Files, Judging Amy, Monk, Charmed, Will & Grace, Malcolm in the Middle, Grey's Anatomy, The Suite Life of Zack & Cody, Reba, So Little Time, Gilmore Girls, The Closer and a recurring role as one of the less intimidating incarnations of God seen by the title character (played by Amber Tamblyn) on the TV series Joan of Arcadia. In 2005, Joosten appeared in the film Wedding Crashers, starring Vince Vaughn and Owen Wilson.

Joosten had a recurring role on Desperate Housewives as Karen McCluskey. For this role, Joosten won two Emmy Awards for Outstanding Guest Actress in a Comedy Series in 2005 and 2008 and once again was nominated for 2010, and appeared as a presenter at the 2005 and 2008 Emmy Awards telecasts. She received Screen Actors Guild Award nominations with the rest of the cast for Outstanding Performance by an Ensemble in a Comedy Series from 2006 to 2008. She was promoted to a member of the regular cast in Season 6. However, the Emmys still billed her as a "Guest Actress" when she was nominated for a third time for Outstanding Guest Actress in a Comedy Series for the 2010 Emmys. She was then nominated for a fourth Emmy, this time for Primetime Emmy Award for Outstanding Supporting Actress in a Comedy Series in 2012. She played Aunt Jackie in Alvin and the Chipmunks: The Squeakquel in 2009.

In 2009, Joosten and Lily Tomlin were in talks to star in a Desperate Housewives spin-off. The spin-off was given a preliminary green light to proceed. However, the series did not proceed.

== Health and death ==
Joosten appeared in numerous television commercials such as those for V8 and Fiber One. In 2007, in an appearance on The View, she revealed that she was in remission from lung cancer, after many years of chain smoking (which she had by then quit). She offered some tips on how to beat the habit of smoking. Coincidentally, her guest roles on My Name Is Earl and Grey's Anatomy revolved largely around her character attempting to quit smoking. In 2001, she quit her 45-year smoking habit when she was diagnosed with lung cancer. In September 2009, Joosten was diagnosed with lung cancer for a second time. She subsequently underwent surgery and four rounds of chemotherapy, and was reportedly found to be cancer-free in January 2010.

Joosten made a guest appearance on The Bold and the Beautiful on February 7, 2011, as part of the show's 6,000th episode, which featured several other real-life lung cancer survivors discussing their experiences with two of the show's characters, played by Susan Flannery and Jack Wagner, who were dealing with lung cancer.

Joosten was named the national spokesperson for the Lung Cancer Profiles campaign on behalf of Pfizer.

Joosten died from a recurrence of lung cancer on June 2, 2012.

== Filmography ==
Year	Title	Role	Notes
1984	Grandview, U.S.A.	Mrs. Clark	
1985	Lady Blue	Margo	1 episode
1987	Sable	Waitress	1 episode
1989	The Package	Waitress	
1995	Pointman	Lois	1 episode
1995	Family Matters	Grocery Checker	1 episode
1995	Picket Fences	Waitress	
1995	Grace Under Fire	Ida Reilly	1 episode
1996	3rd Rock from the Sun	Cafeteria Lady	1 episode
1996	ER	Lois	1 episode
1996	Roseanne	Carol	2 episodes
1996	Goode Behavior	Delores	1 episode
1996	Murphy Brown	Caroline Langston, Secretary #83	1 episode
1996	Boston Common	Mrs. Schuster	1 episode
1997	Seinfeld	Betsy	Episode: "The Little Jerry"
1997	Frasier	Vera	1 episode
1997	Profiler	Morganna Styles	1 episode
1997	Men Behaving Badly	Saleswoman	1 episode
1997	NYPD Blue	Mrs. Prows	1 episode
1997	Life with Roger	Dee-Dee Mitchell	1 episode
1997	Brooklyn South	Mariah Westbrook	2 episodes
1997	Best Men	Edie	
1998	Prey	Nettie	1 episode
1998	Just Shoot Me!	Dina Pierce	1 episode
1998	The Nanny	Harriet	1 episode
1998	Phoenix	Esther	
1998–2003	The Drew Carey Show	Natalie	2 episodes (separate roles)
1998–2001	Dharma & Greg	Claire	7 episodes (recurring role)
1999	Home Improvement	Thelma McCreedy	1 episode
1999	Thanks	Anne Sturges	3 episodes
1999	Tracey Takes On...	Dana	1 episode
1999	Kiss Toledo Goodbye	Inez	
1999–2001	Providence	Renee James O'Meara	2 episodes
1999–2002	The West Wing	Dolores Landingham	30 episodes (recurring role)
2000	Buffy the Vampire Slayer	Genevive Holt	1 episode
2000	Becker	Edna Goldsmith	1 episode
2000	Hellraiser: Inferno	Mary Thorne	
2001	Ally McBeal	Sister Alice	1 episode
2001	Arli$$	June	1 episode
2001	Dead Last	Nurse Alicia	1 episode
2001	Raising Dad	Ella	1 episode
2001	Spin City	Sister Agnes	1 episode
2001–2009	Scrubs	Barbara 'Babs' O'Neil Tanner	3 episodes: 1 uncredited
2002	The X-Files	Agent Edie Boal	episode: "Trust No 1"
2002	Titus	Betty	1 episode
2002	The Division	Constance 'Connie' Langtry	1 episode
2002	So Little Time	Louise Van Horn	1 episode
2002	Even Stevens	Edna Manning	1 episode
2002–2003	General Hospital	Ida Warren	5 episodes
2003	Judging Amy	Judge Drabowsky	1 episode
2003	A.U.S.A.	Ginny Romano	2 episodes
2003	Wasabi Tuna	Erma	
2003	Hope & Faith	Jean Smith	Uncredited
2003	Charmed	Marnie	1 episode
2003	Less than Perfect	Agnes	1 episode
2003	Strong Medicine	Kathryn Nolan	1 episode
2003	Red Roses and Petrol	Nurse Gretchen	
2003	The King of Queens	Maureen	1 episode
2003–2005	Joan of Arcadia	Margo (incarnation of God)	8 episodes
2003–2008	Monk	Neysa Gordon Stempler	2 episodes
2004	Curb Your Enthusiasm	Jenny	1 episode
2004	10-8: Officers on Duty	Mrs. Utenberger	1 episode
2004	Will & Grace	Felicia	1 episode
2004	Yes, Dear	Claire Atkinson	1 episode
2004	Life with Bonnie	Phyllis	1 episode
2004	Everwood	Mrs. Hammerhill	1 episode
2004	Gilmore Girls	Maisy Fortner	1 episode
2004	Breaking Dawn	Neighbor	
2005	Hostage	Officer Louise	
2005	Taking Your Life	Helen	
2005	Grey's Anatomy	Stephanie Drake	1 episode
2005	Love, Inc.	Doris	1 episode
2005	Wedding Crashers	Chazz's Mom	
2005	Malcolm in the Middle	Claire	1 episode
2005	Cheaper by the Dozen 2	Theatre Patron	
2005–2008	My Name Is Earl	Agatha	2 episodes
2005	McBride: It's Murder, Madam	Judge Broderick	1 Episode
2005–2012	Desperate Housewives	Mrs. Karen McCluskey-Bender	87 episodes Primetime Emmy Award for Outstanding Guest Actress in a Comedy Series (Won; 2005, 2008, Nominated; 2010); Nominated - Primetime Emmy Award for Outstanding Supporting Actress in a Comedy Series (2012); Nominated - Screen Actors Guild Award for Outstanding Performance by an Ensemble in a Comedy Series (2006, 2007, 2008)
2006	Reba	Jackie Harmony, Director of Homeless Shelter	1 episode
2006	Intellectual Property	Nurse	
2006	The Suite Life of Zack & Cody	Grandma Marilyn	1 episode
2006	The TV Set	Lois	
2006	The Evidence	Midge	1 episode
2006	Saved	Evelyn Wilson	1 episode
2007	In Case of Emergency	Fran Walsh	1 episode
2007	The Closer	Nurse Townsend	1 episode
2008	Las Vegas	'Robby'	1 episode
2008	Bedtime Stories	Maureen Dixon	
2009	Alvin and the Chipmunks: The Squeakquel	Aunt Jackie	
2011	The Bold and the Beautiful	Herself	
2011	The Cleveland Show	Hazel	
2011	Mega Python vs. Gatoroid	Angie Polk	
2012	The Mentalist	Gloria Williams	1 episode
