= List of The West Wing episodes =

The West Wing is an American serial political drama television series created by Aaron Sorkin that aired on NBC from September 22, 1999, to May 14, 2006. The series is set primarily in the West Wing of the White House, where the Oval Office and offices of presidential senior staff are located, during the fictitious Democratic administration of Josiah Bartlet (played by Martin Sheen). During the course of the series, 154 episodes of The West Wing aired, including two specials over seven seasons.

== Series overview ==
Season	Episodes	Originally released	
Season	Episodes	First released	Last released
1	22	September 22, 1999	May 17, 2000
2	22	October 4, 2000	May 16, 2001
3	21	October 10, 2001	May 22, 2002
4	23	September 25, 2002	May 14, 2003
5	22	September 24, 2003	May 19, 2004
6	22	October 20, 2004	April 6, 2005
7	22	September 25, 2005	May 14, 2006

== Episodes ==
=== Season 1 (1999–2000) ===
No. overall	No. in season	Title	Directed by	Written by	Original release date	Prod. code	US viewers (millions)
1	1	"Pilot"	Thomas Schlamme	Aaron Sorkin	September 22, 1999	475151	16.91
2	2	"Post Hoc, Ergo Propter Hoc"	Thomas Schlamme	Aaron Sorkin	September 29, 1999	225901	13.71
3	3	"A Proportional Response"	Marc Buckland	Aaron Sorkin	October 6, 1999	225902	14.41
4	4	"Five Votes Down"	Michael Lehmann	Story by : Lawrence O'Donnell, Jr. and Patrick Caddell; Teleplay by : Aaron Sorkin	October 13, 1999	225903	12.32
5	5	"The Crackpots and These Women"	Anthony Drazan	Aaron Sorkin	October 20, 1999	225904	12.41
6	6	"Mr. Willis of Ohio"	Christopher Misiano	Aaron Sorkin	November 3, 1999	225905	13.37
7	7	"The State Dinner"	Thomas Schlamme	Aaron Sorkin & Paul Redford	November 10, 1999	225906	13.66
8	8	"Enemies"	Alan Taylor	Story by : Rick Cleveland, Lawrence O'Donnell, Jr. & Patrick Caddell; Teleplay by : Ron Osborn & Jeff Reno	November 17, 1999	225907	12.92
9	9	"The Short List"	Bill D'Elia	Story by : Aaron Sorkin & Dee Dee Myers; Teleplay by : Aaron Sorkin & Patrick Caddell	November 24, 1999	225908	12.37
10	10	"In Excelsis Deo"	Alex Graves	Aaron Sorkin & Rick Cleveland	December 15, 1999	225909	14.23
11	11	"Lord John Marbury"	Kevin Rodney Sullivan	Story by : Patrick Caddell & Lawrence O'Donnell, Jr. Teleplay by : Aaron Sorkin & Patrick Caddell	January 5, 2000	225910	13.65
12	12	"He Shall, from Time to Time..."	Arlene Sanford	Aaron Sorkin	January 12, 2000	225911	13.96
13	13	"Take Out the Trash Day"	Ken Olin	Aaron Sorkin	January 26, 2000	225912	14.92
14	14	"Take This Sabbath Day"	Thomas Schlamme	Story by : Lawrence O'Donnell, Jr. & Paul Redford and Aaron Sorkin; Teleplay by : Aaron Sorkin	February 9, 2000	225913	14.18
15	15	"Celestial Navigation"	Christopher Misiano	Story by : Dee Dee Myers & Lawrence O'Donnell, Jr. Teleplay by : Aaron Sorkin	February 16, 2000	225914	13.48
16	16	"20 Hours in L.A."	Alan Taylor	Aaron Sorkin	February 23, 2000	225915	12.41
17	17	"The White House Pro-Am"	Ken Olin	Lawrence O'Donnell, Jr. & Paul Redford and Aaron Sorkin	March 22, 2000	225916	15.76
18	18	"Six Meetings Before Lunch"	Clark Johnson	Aaron Sorkin	April 5, 2000	225917	14.24
19	19	"Let Bartlet Be Bartlet"	Laura Innes	Story by : Peter Parnell and Patrick Caddell; Teleplay by : Aaron Sorkin	April 26, 2000	225918	13.97
20	20	"Mandatory Minimums"	Robert Berlinger	Aaron Sorkin	May 3, 2000	225919	12.89
21	21	"Lies, Damn Lies and Statistics"	Don Scardino	Aaron Sorkin	May 10, 2000	225920	14.33
22	22	"What Kind of Day Has It Been"	Thomas Schlamme	Aaron Sorkin	May 17, 2000	225921	13.30

=== Season 2 (2000–01) ===
No. overall	No. in season	Title	Directed by	Written by	Original release date	Prod. code	US viewers (millions)
23	1	"In the Shadow of Two Gunmen"	Thomas Schlamme	Aaron Sorkin	October 4, 2000	226201	25.05
24	2	"In the Shadow of Two Gunmen"	Thomas Schlamme	Aaron Sorkin	October 4, 2000	226202	25.05
25	3	"The Midterms"	Alex Graves	Aaron Sorkin	October 18, 2000	226203	16.80
26	4	"In This White House"	Ken Olin	Story by : Peter Parnell & Allison Abner; Teleplay by : Aaron Sorkin	October 25, 2000	226204	17.12
27	5	"And It's Surely to Their Credit"	Christopher Misiano	Story by : Kevin Falls & Laura Glasser; Teleplay by : Aaron Sorkin	November 1, 2000	226205	18.47
28	6	"The Lame Duck Congress"	Jeremy Kagan	Story by : Lawrence O'Donnell, Jr. Teleplay by : Aaron Sorkin	November 8, 2000	226206	18.49
29	7	"The Portland Trip"	Paris Barclay	Story by : Paul Redford; Teleplay by : Aaron Sorkin	November 15, 2000	226207	18.47
30	8	"Shibboleth"	Laura Innes	Story by : Patrick Caddell; Teleplay by : Aaron Sorkin	November 22, 2000	226208	17.49
31	9	"Galileo"	Alex Graves	Kevin Falls and Aaron Sorkin	November 29, 2000	226209	18.99
32	10	"Noël"	Thomas Schlamme	Story by : Peter Parnell; Teleplay by : Aaron Sorkin	December 13, 2000 (Note: In Canada; the US airing was pre-empted for one week by Al Gore's concession speech in the 2000 United States presidential election.)	226210	18.28
33	11	"The Leadership Breakfast"	Scott Winant	Story by : Paul Redford; Teleplay by : Aaron Sorkin	January 10, 2001	226211	17.66
34	12	"The Drop-In"	Lou Antonio	Story by : Lawrence O'Donnell, Jr. Teleplay by : Aaron Sorkin	January 24, 2001	226212	18.02
35	13	"Bartlet's Third State of the Union"	Christopher Misiano	Story by : Allison Abner & Dee Dee Myers; Teleplay by : Aaron Sorkin	February 7, 2001	226213	18.20
36	14	"The War at Home"	Christopher Misiano	Aaron Sorkin	February 14, 2001	226214	18.40
37	15	"Ellie"	Michael Engler	Story by : Kevin Falls & Laura Glasser; Teleplay by : Aaron Sorkin	February 21, 2001	226215	16.43
38	16	"Somebody's Going to Emergency, Somebody's Going to Jail"	Jessica Yu	Paul Redford & Aaron Sorkin	February 28, 2001	226216	18.09
39	17	"The Stackhouse Filibuster"	Bryan Gordon	Story by : Pete McCabe; Teleplay by : Aaron Sorkin	March 14, 2001	226217	17.17
40	18	"17 People"	Alex Graves	Aaron Sorkin	April 4, 2001	226218	16.56
41	19	"Bad Moon Rising"	Bill Johnson	Story by : Felicia Wilson; Teleplay by : Aaron Sorkin	April 25, 2001	226219	16.78
42	20	"The Fall's Gonna Kill You"	Christopher Misiano	Story by : Patrick Caddell; Teleplay by : Aaron Sorkin	May 2, 2001	226220	16.62
43	21	"18th and Potomac"	Robert Berlinger	Story by : Lawrence O'Donnell, Jr. Teleplay by : Aaron Sorkin	May 9, 2001	226221	17.01
44	22	"Two Cathedrals"	Thomas Schlamme	Aaron Sorkin	May 16, 2001	226222	20.72

=== Season 3 (2001–02) ===
No. overall	No. in season	Title	Directed by	Written by	Original release date	Prod. code	US viewers (millions)
45	1	"Manchester"	Thomas Schlamme	Aaron Sorkin	October 10, 2001	227201	23.65
46	2	"Manchester"	Thomas Schlamme	Aaron Sorkin	October 17, 2001	227202	20.79
47	3	"Ways and Means"	Alex Graves	Story by : Eli Attie & Gene Sperling; Teleplay by : Aaron Sorkin	October 24, 2001	227203	21.47
48	4	"On the Day Before"	Christopher Misiano	Story by : Paul Redford & Nanda Chitre; Teleplay by : Aaron Sorkin	October 31, 2001	227204	17.78
49	5	"War Crimes"	Alex Graves	Story by : Allison Abner; Teleplay by : Aaron Sorkin	November 7, 2001	227205	19.48
50	6	"Gone Quiet"	Jon Hutman	Story by : Julia Dahl & Laura Glasser; Teleplay by : Aaron Sorkin	November 14, 2001	227207	19.89
51	7	"The Indians in the Lobby"	Paris Barclay	Story by : Allison Abner; Teleplay by : Allison Abner & Kevin Falls and Aaron Sorkin	November 21, 2001	227208	16.73
52	8	"The Women of Qumar"	Alex Graves	Story by : Felicia Wilson & Laura Glasser & Julia Dahl; Teleplay by : Aaron Sorkin	November 28, 2001	227209	20.86
53	9	"Bartlet for America"	Thomas Schlamme	Aaron Sorkin	December 12, 2001	227210	18.42
54	10	"H. Con-172"	Vincent Misiano	Story by : Eli Attie; Teleplay by : Aaron Sorkin	January 9, 2002	227211	18.38
55	11	"100,000 Airplanes"	David Nutter	Aaron Sorkin	January 16, 2002	227212	19.05
56	12	"The Two Bartlets"	Alex Graves	Story by : Gene Sperling; Teleplay by : Kevin Falls and Aaron Sorkin	January 30, 2002	227213	19.12
57	13	"Night Five"	Christopher Misiano	Aaron Sorkin	February 6, 2002	227214	18.14
58	14	"Hartsfield's Landing"	Vincent Misiano	Aaron Sorkin	February 27, 2002	227215	16.36
59	15	"Dead Irish Writers"	Alex Graves	Story by : Paul Redford; Teleplay by : Aaron Sorkin	March 6, 2002	227216	19.49
60	16	"The U.S. Poet Laureate"	Christopher Misiano	Story by : Laura Glasser; Teleplay by : Aaron Sorkin	March 27, 2002	227217	16.95
61	17	"Stirred"	Jeremy Kagan	Story by : Dee Dee Myers; Teleplay by : Aaron Sorkin & Eli Attie	April 3, 2002	227218	17.26
62	18	"Enemies Foreign and Domestic"	Alex Graves	Paul Redford and Aaron Sorkin	May 1, 2002	227219	17.40
63	19	"The Black Vera Wang"	Christopher Misiano	Aaron Sorkin	May 8, 2002	227220	17.26
64	20	"We Killed Yamamoto"	Thomas Schlamme	Aaron Sorkin	May 15, 2002	227221	15.54
65	21	"Posse Comitatus"	Alex Graves	Aaron Sorkin	May 22, 2002	227222	16.64

=== Season 4 (2002–03) ===
No. overall	No. in season	Title	Directed by	Written by	Original release date	Prod. code	US viewers (millions)
66	1	"20 Hours in America"	Christopher Misiano	Aaron Sorkin	September 25, 2002	175301	18.16
67	2	"20 Hours in America"	Christopher Misiano	Aaron Sorkin	September 25, 2002	175302	18.16
68	3	"College Kids"	Alex Graves	Story by : Debora Cahn and Mark Goffman; Teleplay by : Aaron Sorkin	October 2, 2002	175303	16.70
69	4	"The Red Mass"	Vincent Misiano	Story by : Eli Attie; Teleplay by : Aaron Sorkin	October 9, 2002	175304	15.99
70	5	"Debate Camp"	Paris Barclay	Story by : William Sind & Michael Oates Palmer; Teleplay by : Aaron Sorkin	October 16, 2002	175305	15.91
71	6	"Game On"	Alex Graves	Aaron Sorkin & Paul Redford	October 30, 2002	175306	15.73
72	7	"Election Night"	Lesli Linka Glatter	Story by : David Gerken and David Handelman; Teleplay by : Aaron Sorkin	November 6, 2002	175308	16.22
73	8	"Process Stories"	Christopher Misiano	Story by : Paula Yoo & Lauren Schmidt; Teleplay by : Aaron Sorkin	November 13, 2002	175309	15.79
74	9	"Swiss Diplomacy"	Christopher Misiano	Kevin Falls & Eli Attie	November 20, 2002	175307	15.03
75	10	"Arctic Radar"	John David Coles	Story by : Gene Sperling; Teleplay by : Aaron Sorkin	November 27, 2002	175310	14.28
76	11	"Holy Night"	Thomas Schlamme	Aaron Sorkin	December 11, 2002	175311	15.39
77	12	"Guns Not Butter"	Bill D'Elia	Eli Attie & Kevin Falls and Aaron Sorkin	January 8, 2003	175312	13.96
78	13	"The Long Goodbye"	Alex Graves	Jon Robin Baitz	January 15, 2003	175313	14.45
79	14	"Inauguration: Part I"	Christopher Misiano	Story by : Michael Oates Palmer & William Sind; Teleplay by : Aaron Sorkin	February 5, 2003	175314	13.03
80	15	"Inauguration: Over There"	Lesli Linka Glatter	Story by : David Gerken & Gene Sperling; Teleplay by : Aaron Sorkin	February 12, 2003	175315	13.59
81	16	"The California 47th"	Vincent Misiano	Story by : Lauren Schmidt & Paula Yoo; Teleplay by : Aaron Sorkin	February 19, 2003	175316	12.23
82	17	"Red Haven's on Fire"	Alex Graves	Story by : Mark Goffman & Debora Cahn; Teleplay by : Aaron Sorkin	February 26, 2003	175317	14.01
83	18	"Privateers"	Alex Graves	Story by : Paul Redford & Debora Cahn; Teleplay by : Paul Redford & Debora Cahn and Aaron Sorkin	March 26, 2003	175318	11.70
84	19	"Angel Maintenance"	Jessica Yu	Story by : Eli Attie & Kevin Falls; Teleplay by : Eli Attie and Aaron Sorkin	April 2, 2003	175320	12.72
85	20	"Evidence of Things Not Seen"	Christopher Misiano	Story by : Eli Attie & David Handelman; Teleplay by : Aaron Sorkin	April 23, 2003	175319	13.65
86	21	"Life on Mars"	John David Coles	Story by : Paul Redford & Dee Dee Myers; Teleplay by : Aaron Sorkin	April 30, 2003	175321	13.18
87	22	"Commencement"	Alex Graves	Aaron Sorkin	May 7, 2003	175322	13.37
88	23	"Twenty Five"	Christopher Misiano	Aaron Sorkin	May 14, 2003	175323	13.79

=== Season 5 (2003–04) ===
No. overall	No. in season	Title	Directed by	Written by	Original release date	Prod. code	US viewers (millions)
89	1	"7A WF 83429"	Alex Graves	John Wells	September 24, 2003	176051	18.33
90	2	"The Dogs of War"	Christopher Misiano	John Wells	October 1, 2003	176052	16.33
91	3	"Jefferson Lives"	Alex Graves	Story by : Carol Flint & Debora Cahn; Teleplay by : Carol Flint	October 8, 2003	176053	13.43
92	4	"Han"	Christopher Misiano	Story by : Peter Noah & Mark Goffman and Paula Yoo; Teleplay by : Peter Noah	October 22, 2003	176054	12.06
93	5	"Constituency of One"	Laura Innes	Story by : Eli Attie and Michael Oates Palmer; Teleplay by : Eli Attie	October 29, 2003	176055	13.13
94	6	"Disaster Relief"	Lesli Linka Glatter	Story by : Alexa Junge & Lauren Schmidt; Teleplay by : Alexa Junge	November 5, 2003	176056	12.48
95	7	"Separation of Powers"	Alex Graves	Paul Redford	November 12, 2003	176057	12.42
96	8	"Shutdown"	Christopher Misiano	Mark Goffman	November 19, 2003	176058	13.49
97	9	"Abu el Banat"	Lesli Linka Glatter	Debora Cahn	December 3, 2003	176059	12.77
98	10	"The Stormy Present"	Alex Graves	Story by : John Sacret Young & Josh Singer; Teleplay by : John Sacret Young	January 7, 2004	176060	13.28
99	11	"The Benign Prerogative"	Christopher Misiano	Carol Flint	January 14, 2004	176061	11.86
100	12	"Slow News Day"	Julie Hébert	Eli Attie	February 4, 2004	176062	10.84
101	13	"The Warfare of Genghis Khan"	Bill D'Elia	Peter Noah	February 11, 2004	176063	11.64
102	14	"An Khe"	Alex Graves	John Wells	February 18, 2004	176064	11.43
103	15	"Full Disclosure"	Lesli Linka Glatter	Lawrence O'Donnell, Jr.	February 25, 2004	176065	11.21
104	16	"Eppur Si Muove"	Llewellyn Wells	Alexa Junge	March 3, 2004	176066	11.43
105	17	"The Supremes"	Jessica Yu	Debora Cahn	March 24, 2004	176067	10.76
106	18	"Access"	Alex Graves	Lauren Schmidt	March 31, 2004	176068	10.95
107	19	"Talking Points"	Richard Schiff	Eli Attie	April 21, 2004	176069	11.11
108	20	"No Exit"	Julie Hébert	Story by : Carol Flint & Mark Goffman; Teleplay by : Carol Flint & Debora Cahn	April 28, 2004	176072	11.94
109	21	"Gaza"	Christopher Misiano	Peter Noah	May 12, 2004	176070	10.76
110	22	"Memorial Day"	Christopher Misiano	John Sacret Young & Josh Singer	May 19, 2004	176071	11.03

=== Season 6 (2004–05) ===
No. overall	No. in season	Title	Directed by	Written by	Original release date	Prod. code	US viewers (millions)
111	1	"NSF Thurmont"	Alex Graves	John Wells	October 20, 2004	2T5001	12.27
112	2	"The Birnam Wood"	Alex Graves	John Wells	October 27, 2004	2T5002	11.86
113	3	"Third-Day Story"	Christopher Misiano	Eli Attie	November 3, 2004	2T5003	13.82
114	4	"Liftoff"	Alex Graves	Debora Cahn	November 10, 2004	2T5004	15.26
115	5	"The Hubbert Peak"	Julie Hébert	Peter Noah	November 17, 2004	2T5005	12.41
116	6	"The Dover Test"	Laura Innes	Carol Flint	November 24, 2004	2T5006	11.76
117	7	"A Change Is Gonna Come"	Vincent Misiano	Story by : John Sacret Young; Teleplay by : John Sacret Young & Josh Singer	December 1, 2004	2T5007	13.28
118	8	"In the Room"	Alex Graves	Lawrence O'Donnell, Jr.	December 8, 2004	2T5008	12.33
119	9	"Impact Winter"	Lesli Linka Glatter	Debora Cahn	December 15, 2004	2T5009	12.53
120	10	"Faith Based Initiative"	Christopher Misiano	Bradley Whitford	January 5, 2005	2T5010	11.74
121	11	"Opposition Research"	Christopher Misiano	Eli Attie	January 12, 2005	2T5011	11.88
122	12	"365 Days"	Andrew Bernstein	Mark Goffman	January 19, 2005	2T5012	10.92
123	13	"King Corn"	Alex Graves	John Wells	January 26, 2005	2T5013	10.69
124	14	"The Wake Up Call"	Laura Innes	Josh Singer	February 9, 2005	2T5014	9.62
125	15	"Freedonia"	Christopher Misiano	Eli Attie	February 16, 2005	2T5015	10.17
126	16	"Drought Conditions"	Alex Graves	Debora Cahn	February 23, 2005	2T5016	9.93
127	17	"A Good Day"	Richard Schiff	Carol Flint	March 2, 2005	2T5017	10.66
128	18	"La Palabra"	Jason Ensler	Eli Attie	March 9, 2005	2T5018	10.10
129	19	"Ninety Miles Away"	Rod Holcomb	John Sacret Young	March 16, 2005	2T5019	9.75
130	20	"In God We Trust"	Christopher Misiano	Lawrence O'Donnell, Jr.	March 23, 2005	2T5020	8.96
131	21	"Things Fall Apart"	Nelson McCormick	Peter Noah	March 30, 2005	2T5021	9.88
132	22	"2162 Votes"	Alex Graves	John Wells	April 6, 2005	2T5022	11.62

=== Season 7 (2005–06) ===
No. overall	No. in season	Title	Directed by	Written by	Original release date	Prod. code	US viewers (millions)
133	1	"The Ticket"	Christopher Misiano	Debora Cahn	September 25, 2005	2T6201	8.90
134	2	"The Mommy Problem"	Alex Graves	Eli Attie	October 2, 2005	2T6202	7.66
135	3	"Message of the Week"	Christopher Misiano	Lawrence O'Donnell, Jr.	October 9, 2005	2T6203	7.95
136	4	"Mr. Frost"	Andrew Bernstein	Alex Graves	October 16, 2005	2T6204	8.07
137	5	"Here Today"	Alex Graves	Peter Noah	October 23, 2005	2T6205	7.85
138	6	"The Al Smith Dinner"	Lesli Linka Glatter	Eli Attie	October 30, 2005	2T6206	8.51
139	7	"The Debate"	Alex Graves	Lawrence O'Donnell, Jr.	November 6, 2005	2T6207	9.58
140	8	"Undecideds"	Christopher Misiano	Debora Cahn	December 4, 2005	2T6208	7.26
141	9	"The Wedding"	Max Mayer	Josh Singer	December 11, 2005	2T6209	8.13
142	10	"Running Mates"	Paul McCrane	Peter Noah	January 8, 2006	2T6210	7.40
143	11	"Internal Displacement"	Andrew Bernstein	Bradley Whitford	January 15, 2006	2T6211	6.36
144	12	"Duck and Cover"	Christopher Misiano	Eli Attie	January 22, 2006	2T6212	7.71
145	13	"The Cold"	Alex Graves	Story by : Debora Cahn & Lauren Schmidt; Teleplay by : Debora Cahn	March 12, 2006	2T6213	7.02
146	14	"Two Weeks Out"	Laura Innes	Lawrence O'Donnell, Jr.	March 19, 2006	2T6214	8.07
147	15	"Welcome to Wherever You Are"	Matia Karrell	Josh Singer	March 26, 2006	2T6215	7.93
148	16	"Election Day Part I"	Mimi Leder	Lauren Schmidt	April 2, 2006	2T6216	7.27
149	17	"Election Day Part II"	Christopher Misiano	Eli Attie & John Wells	April 9, 2006	2T6217	8.39
150	18	"Requiem"	Steve Shill	Eli Attie, Debora Cahn & John Wells	April 16, 2006	2T6218	8.29
151	19	"Transition"	Nelson McCormick	Peter Noah	April 23, 2006	2T6219	8.42
152	20	"The Last Hurrah"	Tim Matheson	Lawrence O'Donnell, Jr.	April 30, 2006	2T6220	8.34
153	21	"Institutional Memory"	Lesli Linka Glatter	Debora Cahn	May 7, 2006	2T6221	7.94
154	22	"Tomorrow"	Christopher Misiano	John Wells	May 14, 2006	2T6222	10.11

== Ratings ==
The West Wing : U.S. viewers per episode (millions)

Season	Episode number																						
Season	1	2	3	4	5	6	7	8	9	10	11	12	13	14	15	16	17	18	19	20	21	22	23
1	16.91	13.71	14.41	12.32	12.41	13.37	13.66	12.92	12.37	14.23	13.65	13.96	14.92	14.18	13.48	12.41	15.76	14.24	13.97	12.89	14.33	13.30	–
2	25.05	25.05	16.80	17.12	18.47	18.49	18.47	17.49	18.99	18.28	17.66	18.02	18.20	18.40	16.43	18.09	17.17	16.56	16.78	16.62	17.01	20.72	–
3	23.65	20.79	21.47	17.78	19.48	19.89	16.73	20.86	18.42	18.38	19.05	19.12	18.14	16.36	19.49	16.95	17.26	17.40	17.26	15.54	16.64	–	
4	18.16	18.16	16.70	15.99	15.91	15.73	16.22	15.79	15.03	14.28	15.39	13.96	14.45	13.03	13.59	12.23	14.01	11.70	12.72	13.65	13.18	13.37	13.79
5	18.33	16.33	13.43	12.06	13.13	12.48	12.42	13.49	12.77	13.28	11.86	10.84	11.64	11.43	11.21	11.43	10.76	10.95	11.11	11.94	10.76	11.03	–
6	12.27	11.86	13.82	15.26	12.41	11.76	13.28	12.33	12.53	11.74	11.88	10.92	10.69	9.62	10.17	9.93	10.66	10.10	9.75	8.96	9.88	11.62	–
7	8.90	7.66	7.95	8.07	7.85	8.51	9.58	7.26	8.13	7.40	6.36	7.71	7.02	8.07	7.93	7.27	8.39	8.29	8.42	8.34	7.94	10.11	–

Audience measurement performed by Nielsen Media Research

== Specials ==
Two special episodes were produced to complement the series and broadcast on NBC. The first was a terrorism-themed episode produced in the wake of the September 11 attacks. The episode pushed the scheduled season premiere back a week and encouraged viewers to donate to charity—profits from the episode and cast members' weekly pay were also donated. The episode "was written and produced in record time" – less than three weeks. Although timely and well-intentioned, the episode was criticized for being condescending and preachy.

The second special interspersed the characters' fictional lives with interviews of real West Wing personnel, including Presidents Ford, Carter and Clinton; press secretaries Marlin Fitzwater and Dee Dee Myers; presidential advisors David Gergen, Paul Begala and incumbent Karl Rove; Secretary of State Henry Kissinger; Chief of Staff Leon Panetta; presidential personal secretary Betty Currie; and speechwriter Peggy Noonan. The documentary won a Primetime Emmy Award in 2002 for "Outstanding Special Class Program". Both episodes ran within the season 3 television season and were included on the season's DVD.

A third retrospective "clip-and-interview" special was slated to air in the hour before the series finale; however, it was axed and replaced with a re-run of the "Pilot" episode, as cast members were not contracted to do the special and there were disputes over pay.

No.	Title	Directed by	Written by	Original release date	Prod. code	US viewers (millions)
S1	"Isaac and Ishmael"	Christopher Misiano	Aaron Sorkin	October 3, 2001	227206	25.24
S2	"Documentary Special"	William Couturié	Eli Attie, William Couturié & Felicia Willson (interview materials)	April 24, 2002	227223	15.65

=== "A West Wing Special to Benefit When We All Vote" (2020) ===
"A West Wing Special to Benefit When We All Vote" is a reunion special that was released on HBO Max on October 15, 2020. The special serves as a stage version of the season 3 episode "Hartsfield's Landing". The special intended to raise awareness and support for When We All Vote, a non-profit organization that helps increase participation in United States elections.

Title	Directed by	Written by	Original release date
"A West Wing Special to Benefit When We All Vote"	Thomas Schlamme	Aaron Sorkin; Eli Attie (special material)	October 15, 2020

== See also ==
- List of characters on The West Wing
