= The West Wing season 5 =

The West Wing
- Season 5
- DVD box cover. Cast from top to bottom and left to right: Will, Toby, Leo, Abbey, Josh, Charlie, C. J., President Bartlet and Donna
- Showrunner: John Wells
- Starring: Stockard Channing; Dulé Hill; Allison Janney; Joshua Malina; Janel Moloney; Richard Schiff; John Spencer; Bradley Whitford; Martin Sheen
- No. of episodes: 22

Release
- Original network: NBC
- Original release: September 24, 2003 – May 19, 2004

Season chronology
- ← Previous; Season 4 Next → Season 6

The fifth season of the American political drama television series The West Wing aired in the United States on NBC from September 24, 2003, to May 19, 2004, and consisted of 22 episodes. This was the first season with executive producer John Wells as showrunner after series creator Aaron Sorkin departed the series at the end of the previous season.

== Cast ==
The fifth season had star billing for nine major roles, all of which were filled by returning main cast members from the fourth season. The cast was credited in alphabetical order except for Martin Sheen, who was listed last. Stockard Channing is only credited for the episodes in which she appears.

=== Main cast ===
- Stockard Channing as Abbey Bartlet
- Dulé Hill as Charlie Young
- Allison Janney as C. J. Cregg
- Joshua Malina as Will Bailey
- Janel Moloney as Donna Moss
- Richard Schiff as Toby Ziegler
- John Spencer as Leo McGarry
- Bradley Whitford as Josh Lyman
- Martin Sheen as Josiah Bartlet

== Plot ==
The fifth season opens with First Daughter Zoey Bartlet being rescued from her abductors. President Bartlet takes the presidency back from acting president Walken, but is forced back into a level of powerlessness. He comes to terms with the actions that led to his daughter's kidnapping, a new Republican Speaker of the House (Walken has had to resign in order to assume the presidency) who forces Bartlet into several decisions he does not want to make, including the nomination of an unimpressive Democrat, "Bingo Bob" Russell, for vice president. The conflict with the new Speaker comes to a head in "Shutdown", when the Speaker tries to force the President into cutting federal spending more than had been agreed to and Bartlet refuses, forcing the federal government into a shutdown. Bartlet regains some of his power, cutting a deal to get a liberal Chief Justice, and season five ends with a bombing in Gaza leading Bartlet to push for Israeli peace talks and Josh to grow closer to Donna after she is critically wounded. The fifth season begins toward the end of Bartlet's first year of his second term (fifth year overall) in office. By the end of the season, over a year has elapsed.

== Episodes ==
No. overall	No. in season	Title	Directed by	Written by	Original release date	Prod. code	US viewers (millions)
89	1	"7A WF 83429"	Alex Graves	John Wells	September 24, 2003	176051	18.33
The world watches the desperate search for Zoey Bartlet while rival administrations form an uneasy alliance as a result of President Jed Bartlet invoking the 25th Amendment, causing Speaker of the House Glen Allen Walken, a Republican, to become acting President. The staffs of both men, now forced to work together in the West Wing, weigh options that include a preemptive military strike at terrorist targets — a move that could doom Zoey. Also, the full story behind the assassination of Abdul Shareef is revealed, and a deadly terrorist attack occurs in Turkey. Note: The code in the episode title refers to Zoey Bartlet's FBI case file number. Stockard Channing submitted this episode as an Emmy nominee for Outstanding Supporting Actress. Also submitted as a nominee for Outstanding Drama.
90	2	"The Dogs of War"	Christopher Misiano	John Wells	October 1, 2003	176052	16.33
The international crisis concerning the abduction of President Bartlet's daughter Zoey reaches a critical point as acting President Walken orders the bombardment of Qumari terrorist camps and fences with Leo over the impact of his actions. Toby and Will prepare two speeches, one for each possible outcome of Zoey's abduction. Josh fumes over his perceived notion that the Republicans will exploit and push forward their own legislative agenda, and Toby visits his newborn twins while pondering what will happen. The kidnappers issue a 24-hour deadline for the removal of American troops from Qumar, but an intelligence break brings an end to the crisis. Note: The episode title refers to a phrase spoken by Mark Antony in William Shakespeare's Julius Caesar.
91	3	"Jefferson Lives"	Alex Graves	Story by : Carol Flint & Debora Cahn; Teleplay by : Carol Flint	October 8, 2003	176053	13.43
Following a harrowing chapter in the nation's history, the White House celebrates the Fourth of July, but most of the staff is not in a cheerful mood. C.J. is moved by the resignation letter of a senior State Department diplomat who could not stomach the Shareef assassination. Bartlet endures the painful process of nominating a candidate for Vice President. His first choice, Secretary of State Lewis Berryhill, cannot be approved and he and his staff are unimpressed with the compromise candidate they end up with, reflecting on how recent events have emboldened the Republicans. Meanwhile, the reclusive First Lady tends to personal matters and expresses anger towards her husband and Leo, Amy champions Abbey's violence prevention provisions for an upcoming bill, the President drops in on a citizenship swearing-in ceremony, and Donna is appalled by a cocky new intern, Ryan (Jesse Bradford). Note: The episode title refers to the last words spoken by John Adams, who was unaware that Thomas Jefferson had died hours before.
92	4	"Han"	Christopher Misiano	Story by : Peter Noah & Mark Goffman and Paula Yoo; Teleplay by : Peter Noah	October 22, 2003	176054	12.06
A renowned North Korean pianist is greeted at the White House for a solo performance, but the formalities change when the musician slips a message to the President stating that he wants to defect. Despite C.J.'s passionate argument, others counsel President Bartlet that granting the defection would endanger crucial ongoing nuclear negotiations with Pyongyang. Also, members of the staff work hard to get the President's new choice for Vice President, Colorado Congressman Robert Russell, also known as "Bingo Bob", approved by both houses of Congress and must convince a Democrat who is not a fan of Russell's. Toby and Will express their contempt for the new VP by writing a mock speech highlighting his shortcomings, which is then inadvertently shown on the President's teleprompter instead of their actual speech. Russell is amused by the speech despite its criticism of him, and asks for a copy. Note: The episode title refers to han (한), a Korean term describing a state of profound grief.
93	5	"Constituency of One"	Laura Innes	Story by : Eli Attie and Michael Oates Palmer; Teleplay by : Eli Attie	October 29, 2003	176055	13.13
After Josh is hailed as the "101st Senator" on his birthday in a newspaper profile, he clashes with Senator Chris Carrick, a conservative Democrat from Idaho. Carrick withholds his approval of a backlog of military promotions so he can secure an expensive but ineffective missile system that a former Republican President pledged to build in his state. Will is asked by newly-approved Vice President to be his communications director, while C.J. runs afoul of Leo's temper when she deviates from the administration's scripted line regarding an Environmental Protection Agency report on coal-based energy. Likewise, Amy earns the President's wrath when she aggressively pushes for funding of the First Lady's agenda on violence prevention. Meanwhile, Toby creates a message calendar to maintain focus during President Bartlet's second term. Note: Submitted as Emmy nominee for Outstanding Drama.
94	6	"Disaster Relief"	Lesli Linka Glatter	Story by : Alexa Junge & Lauren Schmidt; Teleplay by : Alexa Junge	November 5, 2003	176056	12.48
Toby is angry that Will left his post to work for Vice President Russell. President Bartlet flies to Oklahoma to lend support after tornadoes devastate an area, but stays for much longer than planned. C.J. is not impressed with his actions and lets him know he is not doing the job he was elected to do. Leo has to deal with plans for a visit by the German Chancellor, a brewing conflict in the Ionian Sea, and the latest of the Secretary of Defense's over-reaching actions. Josh's reputation is damaged when Senator Carrick follows through on his plans to switch parties, abandoning the Democrats, and Leo takes away Josh's budget responsibilities.
95	7	"Separation of Powers"	Alex Graves	Paul Redford	November 12, 2003	176057	12.42
The President's staff wrangles with new Speaker of the House Jeff Haffley over the federal budget. Meanwhile, Toby dispatches former Supreme Court clerk and White House lawyer Joe Quincy (Matthew Perry) to check on the condition of Chief Justice Roy Ashland, an elderly Supreme Court icon who has Washington wondering if he will resign. With the budget deadline quickly approaching, aggressive advisor Angela Blake (Michael Hyatt) faces a major challenge as she tries to work out an agreement that could compromise President Bartlet's campaign promises. The President is also focused on a crucial national television interview that Zoey has agreed to tape with a well-known newswoman, Diane Mathers, who has a knack for exposing raw emotions.
96	8	"Shutdown"	Christopher Misiano	Mark Goffman	November 19, 2003	176058	13.49
While negotiating the budget, Congress reneges on a deal for a continuing resolution to keep the government running. President Bartlet refuses to concede to the Republicans' demands and the government is sent into a shutdown, forcing all nonessential employees to leave work. Speaker Haffley gets out-maneuvered by the President on both PR and substantive issues, and the shutdown is resolved after several days.
97	9	"Abu el Banat"	Lesli Linka Glatter	Debora Cahn	December 3, 2003	176059	12.77
As the Bartlet clan, including a late Ellie, gathers for the White House Christmas tree lighting ceremony, Christian missionaries are arrested in Sudan for proselytizing. Meanwhile, the Drug Enforcement Administration has suspended the license of a doctor who assisted with the suicide of a terminally ill patient in Oregon, where it is legal, the President's attorney general is siding with the DEA; and President Bartlet's son-in-law, Doug Westin, has decided to run for Congress, even though he will not receive the support of the White House. Note: The title is Arabic for "father of daughters", from an Arabic proverb; President Bartlet has three daughters and no sons. Submitted as Emmy nominee for Outstanding Drama.
98	10	"The Stormy Present"	Alex Graves	Story by : John Sacret Young & Josh Singer; Teleplay by : John Sacret Young	January 7, 2004	176060	13.28
When former President Owen Lassiter dies, the two living former Presidents, liberal Democrat D. Wire Newman and conservative Republican Glen Allen Walken, fly on Air Force One with President Bartlet to attend the funeral. Onboard, President Bartlet's two guests partake in a lively debate about their administrations. Lassiter and Newman's past actions haunt the current administration when massive pro-democracy protests are held across Saudi Arabia and the protesters surround a compound containing fifty Americans, leaving President Bartlet to decide whether to support the Saudi regime or to risk the fragile status quo by supporting the protesters' efforts. C.J. meets with an eccentric representative from the Defense Advanced Research Projects Agency and Josh and Angela spar over a states' dispute. Guest starring James Cromwell as President Newman and John Goodman as President Walken. Note: The episode title refers to a quote spoken by Abraham Lincoln one month before signing the Emancipation Proclamation: "The dogmas of the quiet past are inadequate to the stormy present."
99	11	"The Benign Prerogative"	Christopher Misiano	Carol Flint	January 14, 2004	176061	11.86
Toby finishes the State of the Union address a few weeks early, and Joey Lucas, who is now pregnant, polls responses to the speech from the public. Charlie is intrigued by Meeshell Anders (Gabrielle Union), an aspiring journalist who does not initially reveal that she will soon become part of the White House Press Corps. Abbey pressures her husband to pardon a Native American tribal leader convicted of killing two FBI agents in North Dakota. President Bartlet opposes mandatory minimums and guidelines for prison sentences and later pardons over thirty inmates who were harshly sentenced under mandatory minimum laws. Toby hires a new assistant, Rina. Note: The episode title refers to a term used by Alexander Hamilton in reference to Article II, Section 2 of the United States Constitution, which codifies the pardon powers of the president.
100	12	"Slow News Day"	Julie Hébert	Eli Attie	February 4, 2004	176062	10.84
Toby convinces President Bartlet to secretly sanction his solo attempt to make history by reforming Social Security, but his efforts to recruit a Republican senator and a Democratic cohort are publicly divulged, forcing the administration to back down while Josh and Leo are left clueless and furious. Eventually the White House is forced not to take any credit for an emerging deal. Meanwhile, an equally unaware C.J. parries with a reporter who is ready to print all the backstage details.
101	13	"The Warfare of Genghis Khan"	Bill D'Elia	Peter Noah	February 11, 2004	176063	11.64
When the flash of a secret nuclear detonation is detected over the Indian Ocean, President Bartlet calls upon his staff to investigate which nation now has an atomic bomb. As conventional thinking favors Iran, the President orders bombers into the air to destroy the country's most likely uranium-enriched targets. Meanwhile, Josh chides NASA personnel on the future of space exploration, until he is introduced to an attractive female administrator. C.J. fumes when a combative television talk-show host, Taylor Reid, denigrates her on the air, and Will discloses to Vice President Russell that Russell is considered a buffoon by the White House staff. However, it is Russell who manages to dissuade the President from bombing Iran.
102	14	"An Khe"	Alex Graves	John Wells	February 18, 2004	176064	11.43
Two US aircrew are stranded in North Korea, prompting a difficult rescue operation, and bring back memories for Leo of when he was rescued in Vietnam. Meanwhile, the man who rescued him, now the head of a major contractor for the Department of Defense, faces questions in a Senate probe, forcing Leo into a potentially dangerous conflict-of-interest. Josh is corrected by an intern when he misquotes data in a briefing to the President. C.J. appears on the Taylor Reid show to face his on-air taunts. Note: The episode title refers to a town of strategic significance during the Vietnam War. John Spencer submitted this episode as a nominee for Outstanding Supporting Actor in a drama series. Also submitted as nominee for Outstanding Drama Series.
103	15	"Full Disclosure"	Lesli Linka Glatter	Lawrence O'Donnell, Jr.	February 25, 2004	176065	11.21
The West Wing goes into damage control when sensational allegations by former Vice President Hoynes appear in a magazine interview, and with suggestions that an even more damaging book is on the way. Meanwhile, Toby holds talks with union leaders regarding trade with China. Josh tries to avoid a protracted meeting with the Base Closing Committee but ends up angrier with his intern than ever before. Charlie provides an unexpected viewpoint when the Democratic Mayor of Washington D.C. surprises everyone by arguing in favor of school vouchers. Note: Submitted as Emmy nominee for Outstanding Drama.
104	16	"Eppur Si Muove"	Llewellyn Wells	Alexa Junge	March 3, 2004	176066	11.43
When a Republican congresswoman starts a campaign against publicly funded research into sexually transmitted diseases, effectively targeting the President's daughter's work, links emerge to the Vice President's office. The First Lady, reeling from the reaction to her assistance at a health clinic, agrees to soften her image by appearing with characters from Sesame Street. Josh tries to sort-out a deadlock on judicial appointments. Note: The episode title refers to an Italian phrase attributed to Galileo Galilei that translates to "and yet it moves," referring to the movement of the Earth around the Sun.
105	17	"The Supremes"	Jessica Yu	Debora Cahn	March 24, 2004	176067	10.76
When a conservative Supreme Court justice dies suddenly, the White House is in a rush to find a suitable candidate for the spot. Josh pushes to nominate federal judge Evelyn Baker Lang (Glenn Close) to fill the seat, but she is seen as too liberal to be confirmed. However, instead of settling on a compromise candidate moderate enough for both sides of the aisle, Josh and Toby decide to nominate her as the first female Chief Justice of the United States by convincing the ailing liberal Chief Justice Ashland (Milo O'Shea) to retire, while also nominating a conservative but brilliant young judge (William Fichtner) to fill the other open seat. Meanwhile, Congresswoman Andy Wyatt is joining a congressional fact-finding mission to the Middle East that troubles the White House. Note: Submitted as Emmy nominee for Outstanding Drama.
106	18	"Access"	Alex Graves	Lauren Schmidt	March 31, 2004	176068	10.95
A television documentary crew follows C.J. around to film a "typical" day, but the presence of outsiders adds stress when a crisis involving a terrorist shootout with the FBI has C.J. trying to keep the story secret. Meanwhile, C.J. supervises her team in preparation for a formal papal visit with President Bartlet and dodges difficult questions about the future of the current FBI director. Note: Allison Janney won an Emmy for Outstanding Lead Actress in a Drama Series with this episode.
107	19	"Talking Points"	Richard Schiff	Eli Attie	April 28, 2004	176069	11.11
On the eve of the President's controversial trade summit meeting in Brussels, Josh is troubled when he learns that President Bartlet will reverse his position about sacrificing American jobs to foreign countries. C.J. is frustrated with a new FCC ruling allowing multimedia companies increased ownership of TV stations. Meanwhile, the administration tries to downplay job-loss statistics, and Donna tells Josh about her dissatisfaction with her limited role on his staff. In the midst of it all, President Bartlet meets Kate Harper, the brash new Deputy National Security Advisor.
108	20	"No Exit"	Julie Hébert	Story by : Carol Flint & Mark Goffman; Teleplay by : Carol Flint & Debora Cahn	May 5, 2004	176072	11.94
Resentments fester when the White House is locked down after a suspicious substance is found in the air near the Oval Office. Staffers must remain where they are. This is particularly bad news for Toby and Will, whose enmity is increasing in the wake of a Russell speech written by Will that Toby feels undercut the President. Meanwhile, C.J. has some career advice for Donna; Leo and Abbey spar over health issues, personal and political; and Josh gets to know new NSC staffer Kate Harper. Note: The episode title refers to the play No Exit by Jean-Paul Sartre, particularly the line "Hell is other people," which Toby and Will discuss. Stockard Channing and Janel Moloney submitted this episode as Emmy nominees for Outstanding Supporting Actress in a Drama Series.
109	21	"Gaza"	Christopher Misiano	Peter Noah	May 12, 2004	176070	10.76
The episode opens with the American delegation to Israel in the Gaza Strip. A photojournalist from Belfast, Colin Ayres (Jason Isaacs), has paired up with Donna Moss, and takes pictures of her right before an explosion flips over the Suburban carrying her and Admiral Fitzwallace. In a series of flashbacks, Colin shows Donna the human side of the conflict, taking her to visit both Palestinians and Israelis, and Josh reads the emails Donna sends; in the present, Josh and Toby attempt to find out what happened. Two Congressmen and Admiral Fitzwallace are confirmed dead, and an injured Donna is flown to Germany. Leo lets Josh go to be by her side. Note: Janel Moloney submitted this episode as an Emmy nominee for Outstanding Supporting Actress in a Drama Series.
110	22	"Memorial Day"	Christopher Misiano	John Sacret Young & Josh Singer	May 19, 2004	176071	11.03
The killings of key U.S. officials might drag the fuming President into an unending cycle of violence. Events in the tinderbox Gaza Strip spin out of control as the angry President weighs appropriate military action, even as Israel launches its own strikes and surrounds the Palestinian chairman, prompting more retaliatory terrorism. The dangers are compounded when President Bartlet suddenly cannot communicate with the chairman. A wary Josh meets with a Palestinian in an attempt to open up a new diplomatic channel while tending to Donna in Germany. Note: Martin Sheen submitted this episode as an Emmy nominee for Outstanding Lead Actor in a Drama series. John Spencer submitted this episode as a nominee for Outstanding Supporting Actor.

== Reception ==
=== Critical response ===
On Rotten Tomatoes, the season has an approval rating of 65% with an average score of 7.9 out of 10 based on 23 reviews. The website's critical consensus reads, "Executive producer John Wells admirably attempts to maintain the spirit of Aaron Sorkin's vision after succeeding him, but The West Wing's fifth season is a sloppy changing of the guard that bears the Bartlet administration's agenda but possesses not of its finesse or flair."

=== Accolades ===
The fifth season received 12 Emmy Award nominations for the 56th Primetime Emmy Awards, winning one award—Allison Janney for Outstanding Lead Actress in a Drama Series, her fourth win. It was nominated for Outstanding Drama Series, the first year the series did not win the award. Acting nominations included Martin Sheen for Outstanding Lead Actor in a Drama Series, John Spencer for Outstanding Supporting Actor in a Drama Series, Stockard Channing and Janel Moloney for Outstanding Supporting Actress in a Drama Series, and Matthew Perry for Outstanding Guest Actor in a Drama Series.

Thomas Del Ruth received two nominations from the American Society of Cinematographers for the episodes "7A WF 83429" and "Gaza".
