= The American President =

1995 film by Rob Reiner

- Theatrical release poster
- Directed by: Rob Reiner
- Written by: Aaron Sorkin
- Produced by: Rob Reiner
- Starring: Michael Douglas; Annette Bening; Martin Sheen; David Paymer; Samantha Mathis; Michael J. Fox; Richard Dreyfuss
- Cinematography: John Seale
- Edited by: Robert Leighton
- Music by: Marc Shaiman
- Production companies: Castle Rock Entertainment; Universal Pictures; Wildwood Enterprises
- Distributed by: Columbia Pictures (through Sony Pictures Releasing; United States and Canada); Universal Pictures (through United International Pictures; International)
- Release date: November 17, 1995
- Running time: 113 minutes
- Country: United States
- Language: English
- Budget: $62 million
- Box office: $108 million

The American President is a 1995 American political romantic comedy drama film directed and produced by Rob Reiner and written by Aaron Sorkin. It stars Michael Douglas as President Andrew Shepherd, a widower who pursues a romantic relationship with Sydney Ellen Wade (Annette Bening), an environmental lobbyist who has just moved to Washington, D.C. Martin Sheen, Michael J. Fox and Richard Dreyfuss star in supporting roles.

The American President was released on November 17, 1995, by Columbia Pictures (through Sony Pictures Releasing) in the United States and Canada and by Universal Pictures (through United International Pictures) in international markets, and grossed $108 million on a budget of $62 million. It was praised for its lead performances, score, story, and screenplay, and nominated for Golden Globes for Best Picture – Musical or Comedy, Best Director, Best Actor – Musical or Comedy, Best Actress – Musical or Comedy, and Best Screenplay. Marc Shaiman was nominated for the Academy Award for Best Original Musical or Comedy Score. In 2002, the American Film Institute ranked The American President No. 75 on its list of America's Greatest Love Stories.

== Plot ==
Popular Democratic U.S. President Andrew Shepherd prepares to run for re-election. The president and his staff, led by Chief of Staff and best friend A. J. MacInerney, attempt to consolidate the administration's 63% approval rating by passing a moderate crime control bill. However, support for the bill in both parties is tepid: conservatives reject it, and liberals think it is too weak. If passed, however, Shepherd's re-election is presumed to be guaranteed. Shepherd resolves to announce the bill, and have the Congressional support to pass it, by his State of the Union Address.

When the widowed President's cousin Judith is sick and unable to act as hostess at a state dinner for the French president, Shepherd realizes his staff's public portrayal of him as lonely widower is true. Soon after, Shepherd meets and is attracted to Sydney Ellen Wade, a lawyer employed by an environmental lobbying firm working to pass legislation to substantially reduce carbon dioxide emissions. He invites Sydney to act as hostess (and his date) at the state dinner, where she charms the guests and shares a dance with Andy.

During a meeting, Shepherd strikes a deal with Wade: if she can secure 24 votes for the environmental bill before his State of the Union Address, he will deliver the last ten. MacInerney believes Wade will fail to obtain enough votes, thus releasing Shepherd from responsibility if the bill fails to pass.

Shepherd and Wade begin seeing each other and fall in love. Republican presidential hopeful Senator Bob Rumson uses this to mount a character assassination campaign on Shepherd, focusing on Wade's activist past and maligning Shepherd's ethics and family values. The President's refusal to refute Rumson's aspersions lowers his approval ratings and erodes crucial political support that threatens the crime bill.

Wade is dejected after her failed meeting with three Michigan congressmen to discuss the environmental bill. When she tells Shepherd about the meeting, she inadvertently mentions that the only bill the congressmen want to defeat more than the President's crime bill is Wade's environmental bill. Shepherd and MacInerney are conflicted about how they obtained this sensitive information. However, they are unable to ignore the opportunity to pass the crime bill, even if it means the President going back on his deal with Wade.

Eventually, Wade secures enough votes for the environmental bill while Shepherd is three short. He can only obtain them by shelving the environmental bill to solidify the three Michigan congressmen's votes for the crime bill, which he reluctantly agrees to do.

Wade's firm fires her for failing to achieve their objectives and for seemingly jeopardizing her political reputation. She goes to see Shepherd to end their relationship and says she has a job opportunity in Hartford, Connecticut. While he defends the crime bill as his top priority, she criticizes it as weakly worded with little chance of preventing crime.

Prior to the State of the Union Address, Shepherd makes a surprise appearance in the White House press room and rebukes Rumson's attacks on his values and character, as well as his relentless innuendos that Wade prostituted herself for political favors. He declares he will send the controversial environmental bill to Congress with a massive 20% cut in fossil fuels – far more than the 10% originally proposed. Furthermore, he is withdrawing the crime bill for a stronger one that among other things, bans the purchase of handguns by private citizens.

Shepherd's passion galvanizes the press and his staff. Shepherd and Wade are reconciled, then she walks him to the doors of the House chamber where he enters to thunderous applause as he is about to deliver the State of the Union Address.

== Cast ==
- Michael Douglas as President Andrew Shepherd
- Annette Bening as Sydney Ellen Wade, a lobbyist
- Martin Sheen as A. J. MacInerney, White House Chief of Staff
- David Paymer as Leon Kodak, White House Deputy Chief of Staff
- Samantha Mathis as Janie Basdin, personal aide to the President of the United States
- John Mahoney as Leo Solomon, the head of the lobbying firm employing Sydney
- Michael J. Fox as Lewis Rothschild, Senior Domestic Policy Advisor to the President
- Anna Deavere Smith as Robin McCall, White House Press Secretary
- Nina Siemaszko as Beth Wade, Sydney's sister
- Wendie Malick as Susan Sloan
- Shawna Waldron as Lucy Shepherd, the president's daughter
- George Murdock as Congressman
- Anne Haney as Mrs. Chapil, Secretary to the President of the United States
- Richard Dreyfuss as Senator Bob Rumson (R-KS)
- Beau Billingslea as Agent Cooper, United States Secret Service
- Gail Strickland as Esther MacInerney
- Joshua Malina as David
- Taylor Nichols as Stu

== Production ==
Originally, actor Robert Redford approached a number of screenwriters with the single-line premise, "the president elopes". Aaron Sorkin, on the basis of his treatment, was selected by Redford to write the screenplay with Redford attached to star. Emma Thompson turned down the role of Sydney Wade. When Rob Reiner was brought aboard to direct, Redford dropped out. At the time, in October 1994, with cameras set to roll on November 30 of that year, Redford's publicist attributed his decision to his desire "to do a love story, but (Reiner) wanted to do something that was ultimately about politics". Other sources suggested that Redford and Reiner "didn't get along...It was a personality thing."

In later interviews, writer Sorkin told TV Guide he wrote the screenplay while high on crack cocaine while he was living at the Four Seasons Hotel in Los Angeles, which is why it took him three years to complete it.

An extensive White House set, of both the East and West Wings, was built on the Castle Rock Entertainment lot in Culver City. The set's Oval Office was later reused for the films Nixon and Independence Day.

=== Lawsuit ===
William Richert sued the Writers Guild of America over not being credited on the screenplay of the film. Richert claimed Sorkin's screenplay was a thinly veiled plagiarism of Richert's 1981 screenplay The President Elopes. After Guild arbitration, Sorkin was awarded full credit on The American President. Richert also claimed that the television series The West Wing was derived from part of the same screenplay.

== Release ==
The American President grossed $60.1 million in the United States, and $47.8 million in other territories, for a worldwide total of $107.9 million.

The film grossed $10 million in its opening weekend (finishing third), $9.7 million in its second weekend, and $5.3 million in its third (finishing sixth both times).

== Reception ==
On Rotten Tomatoes, The American President has an approval rating of 90% based on 130 reviews. The site's critical consensus reads: "A charming romantic comedy with political bite, Rob Reiner's The American President features strong lead performances and some poignant observations of politics and media in the 1990s." On Metacritic, the film has a weighted average score of 67 out of 100, based on 21 critics, indicating "generally favorable reviews". Audiences polled by CinemaScore gave the film an average grade of "A" on an A+ to F scale.

It received praise and "Two Thumbs Up" from Siskel and Ebert who were surprised by how good the film was, considering Reiner's previous film, North, was chosen by both critics for the worst movie of the year. Ebert said after detesting North, he was very happy and pleased to give Reiner's next film a unanimously positive review. Siskel praised Douglas and Bening for their performances.

Mike Davies of The Birmingham Post wrote, "So liberal it makes Clinton look like Sadam Hussein, Rob Reiner's frothy confection is engaging, amusing and generally downright charming fare about public face and private life."

== Legacy ==
=== Influence on The West Wing ===
The screenplay for the film inspired many aspects of Sorkin's later television drama The West Wing. The two productions follow the staff of a largely idealized White House, and like many of Sorkin's projects, share ideologies.

The film's influence can be seen most clearly in early episodes of the series; some dialogue-passages in the two are nearly identical. Sorkin has been known to say that much of the first season was actually taken from material he edited out of the first draft of The American President's script.

One of the issues touched on in the film and developed in the series relates to gun control bills, developed in "Five Votes Down". While the bill is ultimately withdrawn by President Shepherd because it is ineffectual, on the series President Bartlet and his staff work hard to pass their bill even though it is badly flawed (and end up doubly unhappy when VP John Hoynes, whom the President and senior staff are feuding with, clinches the bill for them by persuading an influential southern Democrat to support it).

More significant is the issue of a "proportional response" to military attacks on American assets abroad. In The American President, Andrew Shepherd finds himself in the Situation Room having to order such an attack against Libya's intelligence headquarters after they bombed a missile defense system called "C-STAD" (Capricorn Surface-to-Air Defense) which had been positioned by the U.S. in Israel. He muses for a single line "Someday, someone's gonna have to explain to me the virtue of a proportional response", before giving the order. In "A Proportional Response", President Bartlet finds himself in similar circumstances (Syrian intelligence shot down a U.S. plane in Jordan and killed numerous Americans, including a young Naval officer who the President had decided would be his personal physician) and, seated in the White House Situation Room with his own National Security Council asks: "What is the virtue of a proportional response?" In both cases, the President chooses a military response that is relatively measured, but in the movie President Shepherd never considers a "disproportionate" response while President Bartlet plans such an action to destroy a large civilian airport in Syria; he eventually gives the green light for a strike similar to the one used in the movie.

The Global Defense Council, the fictional environmental lobby where Sydney Wade worked, is also featured in the West Wing episode called "The Drop-In", and is often referred to in other episodes.

In The American President, Sydney Ellen Wade is ultimately fired from her lobbyist position because the president has brokered a deal that causes her legislative effort to fail. Similarly, in the final episode of the third season of The West Wing, Deputy Chief of Staff Josh Lyman uses the same tactic and ends up getting Amy Gardner fired from her position at the Women's Leadership Conference. Josh and Amy are dating when this takes place, just as the main characters are here. However, on the TV series it is Amy who tries to scuttle a bill (welfare reform) and Josh refuses to accept the demands of three Republican Congressmen because they amount to blackmail.

The American President includes mention of a Governor Stackhouse, while there is a Minnesota senator Howard Stackhouse (George Coe) in the West Wing episodes "The Stackhouse Filibuster" and "The Red Mass". In the same way, the French President attending a state dinner in The American President seems to be the same President d'Astier often referred to in The West Wing.

Several actors from The American President reappear in The West Wing, including Martin Sheen (whose character in The American President, A.J., is at one point accused by Shepherd of lacking the courage to run for office himself) as President Josiah Bartlet, Anna Deavere Smith as National Security Advisor Dr. Nancy McNally, Joshua Malina as White House Communications Director Will Bailey, Nina Siemaszko as Ellie Bartlet, Ron Canada as Under Secretary of State Theodore Barrow, and Thom Barry as Congressman Mark Richardson.

Portrayals of the president as idealistic but indecisive are also similar. In The American President, Shepherd has to be convinced by his staff to stand up to his Republican opponent and pursue gun control and environmental legislation decisively. In The West Wing, Bartlet is sometimes referred to as “Uncle Fluffy” when endorsing moderate views that are more conciliatory and less resolute (for example, in the episodes “Let Bartlet Be Bartlet” and “The Two Bartlets”). More generally, both presidents are former university professors (history in the movie, economics in the show) with no military experience and a low tolerance for political expediency.

=== Further legacy ===
The concept for the television show Spin City was set in motion after the writers had seen Michael J. Fox in The American President playing one of the President's political aides. They wanted him to play a similar character for television.

In January 2012, while criticizing then-leader of the opposition (and future Prime Minister) Tony Abbott in a speech at the National Press Club in Canberra, Australian Federal Minister (and another future Prime Minister) Anthony Albanese plagiarised several lines from The American President.

In April 2013, New York Times columnist Maureen Dowd drew a sharp contrast between President Obama's unsuccessful effort to secure passage of expanded background-check legislation in the Senate, on one hand, and the all-out vote-gathering effort in The American President. The President responded to the column at the 2013 White House Correspondents' Dinner, noting the criticism and posing a series of rhetorical questions to Michael Douglas, who he said was in the audience, including, "Could it be that you were an actor in an Aaron Sorkin liberal fantasy?"

In the 2016 Presidential election candidate Ted Cruz paraphrased a portion of The American President when fellow candidate Donald Trump insulted Cruz's wife. Cruz stated, "...and if Donald wants to get into a character fight, he’s better off sticking with me because Heidi is way out of his league,” alluding to the speech President Shepherd made about Rumson's attacks on Sydney Ellen Wade.

The film is recognized by the American Film Institute as number 75 in its 2002 list of 100 Years...100 Passions.
