= Main Title (The West Wing) =

1999 theme music by W. G. Snuffy Walden

- Theme music by W. G. Snuffy Walden
- Genre: Orchestral, gospel, taps
- Related: The West Wing
- Composed: 1999
- Duration: 0:51

Audio sample
- W. G. Snuffy Walden combines the gospel, taps, and orchestral genres in creating the theme music of The West Wing.: file; help

"Main Title (The West Wing)" is the theme music of The West Wing, an American television political drama about the presidency of the United States and its staff. It was composed by W. G. Snuffy Walden on guitar, and performed by an orchestra for the title sequence. It is a mix of the gospel, taps, and blue-jeans styles. Reception of the theme has been mostly positive, with author Melissa Crawley commenting that it "reflects the values of an idealized American culture".

== Background, composition, and release ==
The West Wing's creator, Aaron Sorkin, originally wanted a theme in the style of Phil Collins, with a big drum and a quasi-rock feel—he approached W. G. Snuffy Walden to score the show, having seen his work on thirtysomething and inviting him first to his other show, Sports Night. For the first few episodes, the theme came from music composed by John Williams for the Olympic Games. Walden, on the other hand, recalled a conversation with Stephen King in which he advised "Snuff, it's gotta be blue-jeans music: Americana, but it can't be stuffy". Walden remarked in an interview that the piece's use as a theme came about by accident; it was originally created for a scene in "A Proportional Response" in which Josiah Bartlet makes a national address from the Oval Office. Upon hearing the piece, Thomas Schlamme simply remarked, "that's our theme".

"West Wing Suite", by Pete Anthony
The "West Wing Suite" highlights the plaintive and Americana aspect of the theme.

Walden originally composed the piece on guitar, then created a score for a full orchestra; he stated that he wanted the music to have a "heroic feel". He also remarked that to highlight the presidency and its power, the theme consisted of "a little bit of Taps, a little bit of gospel and a little bit of Copland". Author Melissa Crawley comments that these influences help the music represent American values, and that the influence of Copland in particular helped contribute to the Americana and folk music feel of the piece.

Walden remarked in an interview that while the theme was used outside of the title sequence, he worked not to overuse the theme in other moments of the show, as that would diminish its power. However, he felt that he could use the gospel-style theme for President Bartlet whenever needed.

While the piece was composed for the show, a "West Wing Suite" was released in a W. G. Snuffy Walden album in 2000, which also contained the theme. In addition, a two-CD version of the piece was released in 2017.

== Reception and impact ==
Reception of the theme has been mostly positive. Melissa Crawley called the composition "epic and expansive", commenting that it "reflects the values of an idealized American culture". TVLine included the theme in its 2020 list of the best television themes of the 1990s, referring to it as "triumphant". Author Patrick Webster, on the other hand, criticized the piece for not coming to a clear resolution, "rising and then falling but never seeming to reach a destination".

For his work on "Main Title (The West Wing)", W. G. Snuffy Walden won a Primetime Emmy Award for Outstanding Original Main Title Theme Music in 2000. In 2020, he reprised the theme for A West Wing Special to Benefit When We All Vote, performing the theme on his guitar.

On July 9, 2016, Lin-Manuel Miranda gave his final performance as the titular character in Hamilton: An American Musical on Broadway. Miranda, who created the play, cited The West Wing as an influence; he was reportedly surprised when the orchestra broke into The West Wing's theme as a send-off for him in his last showing.
