= The Supremes (disambiguation) =

The Supremes were a Motown all-female singing group.

The Supremes or Supremes may also refer to:

- The Supremes (1975 album)
- The Supremes (2000 album), a box set
- "The Supremes", an episode of The West Wing
- The Supreme Court of the United States or, collectively, its members
- Ruby and the Romantics, formerly the Supremes, a group from Akron, Ohio
