= The Last Affair =

- Directed by: Henri Charbakshi
- Produced by: Henri Charbakshi
- Starring: Ron Dean; Jack Wallace
- Cinematography: Robin T. Rutledge
- Release date: 1976
- Running time: 80 minutes
- Country: United States
- Language: English

The Last Affair is a 1976 American drama film directed by Henri Charbakshi and starring Ron Dean and Jack Wallace.

== Cast ==
- Debbie Dan as Mary
- Ron Dean as David
- Jack Wallace
- Del Close
- Betty Thomas

== Production ==
The film was shot in Chicago during the winter of 1975. The film was originally meant to feature hardcore sex, although it was eventually edited in order to receive an R rating. The shooting of these scenes is chronicled in the 1976 documentary A Labor of Love.

== Reception ==
Roger Ebert awarded the film one and a half stars and wrote, ""The Last Affair" is an appallingly bad movie - so completely bankrupt in ideas, in characterization, in simple common sense that it's little wonder its makers bought a theater to get it shown."

Gene Siskel of the Chicago Tribune awarded the film one star, calling it "the first film I've seen that is all supporting scenes and no main story."
