= Eppur Si Muove (The West Wing) =

- The West Wing episode
- The president urges Ellie to go public.
- Episode no.: Season 5 Episode 16
- Directed by: Llewellyn Wells
- Written by: Alexa Junge
- Production code: 176066
- Original air date: March 3, 2004

Guest appearances
- Gary Cole; Lily Tomlin; Nina Siemaszko; Melissa Marsala; Brian Kerwin; Michael Gaston; Deirdre Lovejoy; NiCole Robinson; John LaFayette; Cherry Jones; Sesame Street Muppets

Episode chronology
← Previous "Full Disclosure"	Next → "The Supremes"
- The West Wing season 5

"Eppur Si Muove" is the 104th episode of The West Wing, and sixteenth of its fifth season. It originally aired on NBC on March 3, 2004. Events center on a controversy relating to the National Institutes of Health, involving President Bartlet’s middle daughter Ellie. Written by Alexa Junge and directed by Llewellyn Wells, the episode contains guest appearances by Michael Gaston, Deirdre Lovejoy, and Cherry Jones, as well as the Muppet characters from Sesame Street.

== Plot ==
Republican Congresswoman Barbara Layton (Cherry Jones) starts a campaign against publicly funded NIH projects into sexually transmitted infections. The attack is based on a list of seemingly useless projects, but by association, her real target becomes the president's daughter Ellie, who is working on a study into the human papillomavirus that researched conditions for sex workers in Puerto Rico. The President is infuriated at having a family member dragged into political battles, and Toby tries to discredit the attack by finding its source. At first the list seems to originate from a far-right group called the "Traditional Values Alliance", but Toby's assistant Rina uncovers an updated list that shows it came from within the administration. Toby immediately suspects the Vice President's office. When confronted, Will takes full responsibility, and assures that the list was compiled purely for internal use and not leaked on purpose. Will suspects that his boss might have leaked the material on purpose, however, and Russell in private agrees he has ties to the Republicans on health issues and notes that having some distance from the President isn't a bad thing for him. Will is left utterly disgusted with the Vice President.

Meanwhile, President Bartlet tries to persuade Ellie to speak to the press to contain the incidence, but Ellie insists she is not as comfortable with the spotlight as the other members of the family. She later watches her mother make an airy appearance on Sesame Street to defend her right to practice medicine even after voluntarily giving up her license. This inspires her to follow her father's advice, and give a passionate public statement about the necessity of a politically independent scientific community.

In parallel storylines, Josh tries to end a deadlock on the appointment of a Sixth Circuit judge. His old friend Eric Hayden (Gaston) has been waiting for a year for confirmation from the Republican-led Congress, and is offered the position of dean of Georgetown's law school. But Josh suggests making a temporary recess appointment that will at least put the issue on the agenda and Hayden agrees. When Josh goes to suggest this to Leo he is told that the issue will have to wait, as one of the Supreme Court justices has died. Having assumed the ailing Chief Justice, Roy Ashland, was the fatality, Josh is surprised to learn that the dead Justice is 52-year-old Owen Brady, who suffered a heart attack. C. J., meanwhile, tries to reconcile with her boyfriend from college, Ben, whom she has been forced to ignore due to her workload. Based on Ben's reaction at the end of their very brief conversation, C. J. regrets her approach and fears that she may have caused things with Ben to end before they could even begin. Upon voicing this concern to Toby, he advises her to go to Ben and fix it. Ryan Pierce, the intern working for Josh, uncharacteristically fails to show up for work. Josh has failed to notice until Donna voices her concern as she tries, unsuccessfully, to contact Ryan.

== Social and cultural references ==
The title of the episode refers to the president quoting Galileo Galilei, leaving the Roman Inquisition after having recanted his heliocentric theory of the universe. "Eppur si muove" – "And yet it moves". The story – as Ellie points out – is probably apocryphal, but evidence shows that it was current as early as a decade after Galileo's trial.

The advocacy group "Traditional Values Alliance" is a thinly veiled version of the real-life "Traditional Values Coalition" (TVC). TVC sent a letter of protest to NBC producers, reacting to their portrayal on the show. In particular it was the association with a group stating that "The Lord Hates Homosexuals" that provoked the coalition, reading in this an allusion to the controversial anti-gay pastor Fred Phelps. TVC, the group pointed out in its letter, had clearly distanced itself from Phelps and his methods.

The restaurant, "1789", that Ben and C.J. planned lunch at is a real restaurant in Washington.
