= The Supremes (The West Wing) =

- The West Wing episode
- Episode no.: Season 5 Episode 17
- Directed by: Jessica Yu
- Written by: Debora Cahn
- Production code: 176067
- Original air date: March 24, 2004

Guest appearances
- Glenn Close as Evelyn Baker Lang; William Fichtner as Christopher Mulready; Milo O'Shea as Roy Ashland; Robert Picardo as E. Bradford Shelton; Deirdre Lovejoy as Lisa Wolfe

Episode chronology
← Previous "Eppur Si Muove"	Next → "Access"
- The West Wing season 5

"The Supremes" is the seventeenth episode of the fifth season of American serial political drama television series The West Wing. It originally aired on NBC on March 24, 2004. In "The Supremes", the White House senior staff, under Democratic President Josiah Bartlet, looks to nominate a judge to the Supreme Court of the United States when Josh comes up with a plan to, instead of nominating a centrist to the seat, nominate one liberal and one conservative candidate to two seats on the Court. The episode was met with mixed reception, although it was later noted the show bore similarities to the 2016 death and replacement of real-life Supreme Court Justice Antonin Scalia.

== Plot ==
The end of the previous episode announced the death of Owen Brady, a fifty-two year old justice of the Supreme Court of the United States. In the current episode, the White House senior staff works to find a replacement for Brady, taking interviews with judges who are considered potential nominees to fill the seat. Josh and Toby Ziegler take a meeting with Evelyn Baker Lang, a liberal court of appeals judge, although Lang is not a serious potential candidate; she was brought in as a diversion to scare the Republican Senate majority into confirming a more moderate nominee.

However, Josh is impressed by his meeting with Lang, in which she correctly deduces the meeting's role as a political tactic and demonstrates in-depth knowledge of the Senate Judiciary Committee. Josh wants to put Lang on the court, but after she discloses that she had a legal abortion, the senior staff hesitates, fearing that nominating her would be harmful to both her image and the president's.

Josh, inspired by a story Donna Moss told him, proposes a strategy to Toby; Lang will be nominated to be the first female Chief Justice, replacing the aging incumbent Roy Ashland, in exchange for letting Republicans fill Brady's seat with one of their own. Toby disagrees, arguing that the White House could potentially select its own candidates for both seats if Ashland dies; Josh reminds him that both candidates would then be moderates, not true liberals.

Josh and Toby go to Ashland to propose the idea; he skeptically agrees. Senate Republicans give Josh the name Christopher Mulready as the committee's choice for Brady's seat; Toby immediately objects, citing Mulready's extreme conservative positions. Bartlet is similarly unreceptive. After some time, though, Toby comes back into Josh's office, expressing reluctant support for his plan.

Mulready and Lang are brought in to the White House to meet with President Bartlet. In the Oval Office, Mulready argues that "the Court was at its best when Brady was fighting Ashland", and when Bartlet responded that moderation has created good law in the past, Mulready counters that ideology and principle have laid the foundation for future shifts in perspective from the Court. Bartlet, impressed, agrees to nominate both Mulready and Lang to the Supreme Court. The final scene depicts the White House press corps giving a standing ovation as Bartlet announces his nominees.

== Cast ==
- Martin Sheen as Josiah "Jed" Bartlet, the President of the United States
- John Spencer as Leo McGarry, the White House Chief of Staff
- Bradley Whitford as Josh Lyman, the Deputy White House Chief of Staff
- Janel Moloney as Donna Moss, the assistant to Josh Lyman
- Dulé Hill as Charlie Young, the Personal Aide to the President
- Richard Schiff as Toby Ziegler, the White House Communications Director
- Allison Janney as C. J. Cregg, the White House Press Secretary
- Joshua Malina as Will Bailey, the Deputy White House Communications Director

== Reaction and influence ==
Reception for the episode was mixed. In 2016, Brian Lowry with Variety likened the 2004 episode to the then-current controversy around the death of Supreme Court Justice Antonin Scalia and the nomination of Merrick Garland, citing it as an example of how a President and Senate of opposed parties could work out their differences. Lowry, however, also dismissed the plot as unrealistic, along with the praiseworthy notion that characters who disagreed politically could act out of ideological principle.

Lisa McElroy with Slate also compared "The Supremes" to Garland and Scalia in an article entitled "This West Wing Episode Predicted the Controversy Around Scalia's Replacement in Eerie Detail", noting that various quotes from the episode could be read as tributes to Scalia's memory instead of Brady's despite Scalia's death occurring twelve years afterward. McElroy covers some of the episode sarcastically, writing that the White House senior staff are "our Sorkin-created superheroes... They might not be able to keep the president from getting MS, or his daughter from getting kidnapped, but this Supreme Court maneuver? All in a day's work." However, she does praise the debate scene between Lang and Mulready, noting that both participants seemed to gain knowledge and insight from the conversation and comparing it to the friendship between Scalia and fellow Justice Ruth Bader Ginsburg. McElroy noted that the episode felt true to the style of Aaron Sorkin, the show's creator who had left the show at the end of the previous season.
