= Ron Dean =

American actor (1938–2025)

- Born: August 15, 1938; Chicago, Illinois, U.S.
- Died: October 5, 2025 (aged 87); Chicago, Illinois, U.S.
- Occupation: Actor
- Years active: 1976–2016

Ronald Charles Dean (August 15, 1938 – October 5, 2025) was an American film and television actor. He appeared in films including Risky Business, The Breakfast Club, Cocktail, The Babe, The Fugitive, Rudy, The Client, and The Dark Knight. He is known for having often played detectives and other law-enforcement characters, most notably as Det. Marion Zeke Crumb in the fantasy comedy-drama television series Early Edition.

== Background ==
Dean was born in Chicago, Illinois, on August 15, 1938. He attended DeKalb School of the Arts. He died at a hospital in Chicago on October 5, 2025, at the age of 87.

Dean had a troubled youth involving petty crime and time in reform schools. In 1955 he escaped from the lockup of a North Side Chicago police station, found a gun in a desk drawer, and when confronted by Officer Albert Brown, shot and killed him. When asked why, he reportedly said, “I don’t know. He came at me and I shot him.” He pleaded guilty to murder and served 12 years in prison.

== Career ==
Dean's early films included The Last Affair (1976) and Continental Divide (1981). He appeared in three films starring Tom Cruise: Risky Business (1983), The Color of Money (1986), and Cocktail (1988). Other films include Teachers (1984), The Breakfast Club (1985), Code of Silence (1985), Nothing in Common (1986), Above the Law (1988), The Babe (1992), The Fugitive (1993), Rudy (1993), The Client (1994), Eye for an Eye (1996), Chain Reaction (1996), The Guardian (2006), and The Dark Knight (2008).

His television roles included guest appearances in T. J. Hooker, Wiseguy, Perfect Strangers, NYPD Blue, Murder, She Wrote, ER, The West Wing, Chicago Hope, Without a Trace, CSI: Crime Scene Investigation, Cold Case, Still Standing, Numb3rs, Six Feet Under, Chicago P.D., as well as recurring roles playing Seattle cop Frank Collins in Frasier, Det. Marion Zeke Crumb in Early Edition, and Commanding Chief Fire Marshal of the CFD's Office of Fire Investigations James Whoritsky in Chicago Fire.

== Select filmography ==
=== Film ===
Year	Title	Role	Notes
1976	The Last Affair	David	
1981	Continental Divide	Plesko	
1983	Risky Business	Detective With Bullhorn	
1983	The Big Score	Kowalski	
1984	Teachers	Guard	
1985	The Breakfast Club	Mr. Clark, Andy's Father	
1985	Code of Silence	Detective Brennan	
1986	Nothing in Common	Ed Bedsole	
1986	The Color of Money	Guy In Crowd	
1987	Big Shots	Policeman #2	
1987	Light of Day	Mourner	
1988	Above the Law	Detective Lukich	
1988	Cocktail	Uncle Pat	
1989	The Package	Karl Richards	
1992	The Babe	Umpire Owens	
1993	The Fugitive	Detective Kelly	
1993	Rudy	Coach Yonto	
1994	The Client	Johnny "Uncle Johnny" Sulari	
1994	House of Angels – The Second Summer	Sven Pettersson	
1995	Steal Big Steal Little	Nick's Boy	
1996	Eye for an Eye	Detective At McCann House	
1996	Chain Reaction	Sergeant Nick Zingaro	
1997	Chicago Cab	Old Snack Trucker	
2006	The Guardian	Navy Captain	
2008	The Dark Knight	Detective Wuertz	
2012	One Small Hitch	Art Burke	

=== Television ===
Year	Title	Role	Notes
1985–1986	Lady Blue	Sergeant Gino Gianelli	Main cast
1985	T. J. Hooker	Detective #2	Episode: "The Chicago Connection"
1986–1987	Crime Story	Chief Kramer	Recurring role, 9 episodes
1988	Wiseguy	Detective Mulcahy	Episode: "Phantom Pain"
1990	DEA	Detective Tom Neally	Episode: "America's War on Drugs"
1991	Perfect Strangers	Fire Chief Newton	Episode: "Great Balls of Fire"
1992	Angel Street	Detective Branigan	Main cast, 4 episodes (4 unaired)
1993	Flying Blind	John Doe	Episode: "The Spy Who Came in from the Old"
1994–1998	Frasier	Frank	3 episodes
1994–2004	NYPD Blue	Joe Brockhurst / Vincent Mackie	5 episodes
1995	Pig Sty	Tony Falcone	Episode: "The Maltese Falcone"
1995	Murder, She Wrote	Lieutenant Shawn Reilly	Episode: "Unwilling Witness"
1996	Life's Work	Mr. Zafrani	2 episodes
1996–2000	Early Edition	Detective Marion "Zeke" Crumb	Recurring role, 17 episodes
1998	ER	Uncle Joey	Episode: "The Good Fight"
1999	Chicago Hope	Baseball Scout	Episode: "Vigilance and Care"
2001	What About Joan?	Mr. Howard Evans	Episode: "Joan Meets the Parents"
2001	Special Unit 2	Police Captain	2 episodes
2002	Raising Dad	Mr. Zafrani	Episode: "The House of Stewart"
2004	The West Wing	Tom Broderick	Episode: "Full Disclosure"
2004	Wild Things 2	Judge Ruben	Television film
2004	Without a Trace	Willie	Episode: "Legacy"
2004	CSI: Crime Scene Investigation	Woody	Episode: "Turn of the Screws"
2004–2006	Still Standing	"Slim" Callahan	2 episodes
2005	Numb3rs	Peter Watson	Episode: "Dirty Bomb"
2005	Six Feet Under	Karl Holzenchenko	Episode: "Eat a Peach"
2005	Cold Case	Troy Cage In 2005	Episode: "Colors"
2009	The Beast	Petransky	1 episode
2012–2013	Chicago Fire	James Whoritsky	3 episodes
2015	Sense8	"Duke"	Episode: "I Am Also a We"
2016	Chicago P.D.	Ray Sharansky	Episode: "In a Duffel Bag"
