= Kris Engskov =

American presidential aide

Personal Aide to the President
- In office December 1997 – June 2000
- President: Bill Clinton

Personal details
- Born: 1971 or 1972 (age 53–54)
- Education: University of Arkansas (BA)

Kris Engskov (born 1971 or 1972) is an American executive and former political aide who was President Bill Clinton's body man from 1997 to 2000. He was hired a month before the Clinton–Lewinsky scandal broke and was called to testify before a grand jury on the matter twice. That was despite having taken the position after most of the events in question already had occurred.

== Background ==
An Arkansas native from Berryville, Engskov had a childhood encounter with Clinton during a campaign visit to his home town in the 1970s. Engskov graduated from the University of Arkansas in Fayetteville with a Bachelor of Arts degree in public administration.

== Career ==
Engskov started his career at the White House working for the travel office in 1993 shortly after the White House travel office controversy erupted. His work in keeping travel for White House correspondents flowing smoothly during the transition was lauded by a Washington Times reporter, who wrote that Engskov "stood out, clearing travel plan hurdles with his dry humor and confidence," as when he stepped in to convince the United States Air Force not to block takeoff of a charter flight whose pilot had no money to pay for fuel at Andrews Air Force Base. He then worked as an assistant press secretary for about two years and during that time, Clinton made an April Fools' Day announcement of Engskov to replace an injured Mike McCurry:

Still hobbled from his knee surgery, Clinton deadpanned that McCurry had "made a fool of himself" by falling down and hurting his knee... "until we can bring him back to full health, Chris [sic] Engskov is going to do the daily briefing today, and he will be my press secretary during Mike's absence," Clinton said. Engskov, 25, is an Arkansas native who works in the press office. "I thought we ought to have a presidential secretary who doesn't have an accent," Clinton quipped.

Engskov became the president's body man in December 1997.

=== Post-Clinton administration ===
In June 2000 he left the White House to work as an analyst at the Madrona Venture Group in Seattle. In 2003, he joined Starbucks as a director of public policy. As of 2009, Engskov was serving as a member of the King County Task Force on Regional Human Services.

On July 20, 2011, it was announced that Engskov would become the new managing director of Starbucks UK and Ireland starting in September 2011. John Culver, president of Starbucks Coffee International, said of the move: "Kris brings a great deal of operational and public affairs experience to the role, and is an ideal candidate to continue the momentum Starbucks has achieved in this region. The addition of Kris to the team is a further sign of our commitment to international markets as a key growth engine for the company." On January 3, 2019, Engskov announced he would be the next president of Aegis Living, a Bellevue, Washington-based assisted living and memory care company, and take the role in the spring of 2019.

== Other ==
The character Charlie Young from The West Wing, played by actor Dulé Hill, is based in part on Engskov. Former Clinton press secretary Dee Dee Myers, who served as a consultant to the show, arranged for Hill to meet his real-life counterpart in 1999 when the show was just beginning. Engskov later joked that unlike Charlie, he would never have dated the president's daughter out of a concern for "job security."

Author Christopher Farnsworth met with Engskov to discuss White House operations while preparing to write the 2010 vampire novel Blood Oath, and thanked Engskov in the acknowledgements in the book.

== See also ==
- Body man
