= Michael Heller (law professor) =

American professor of property rights and ownership

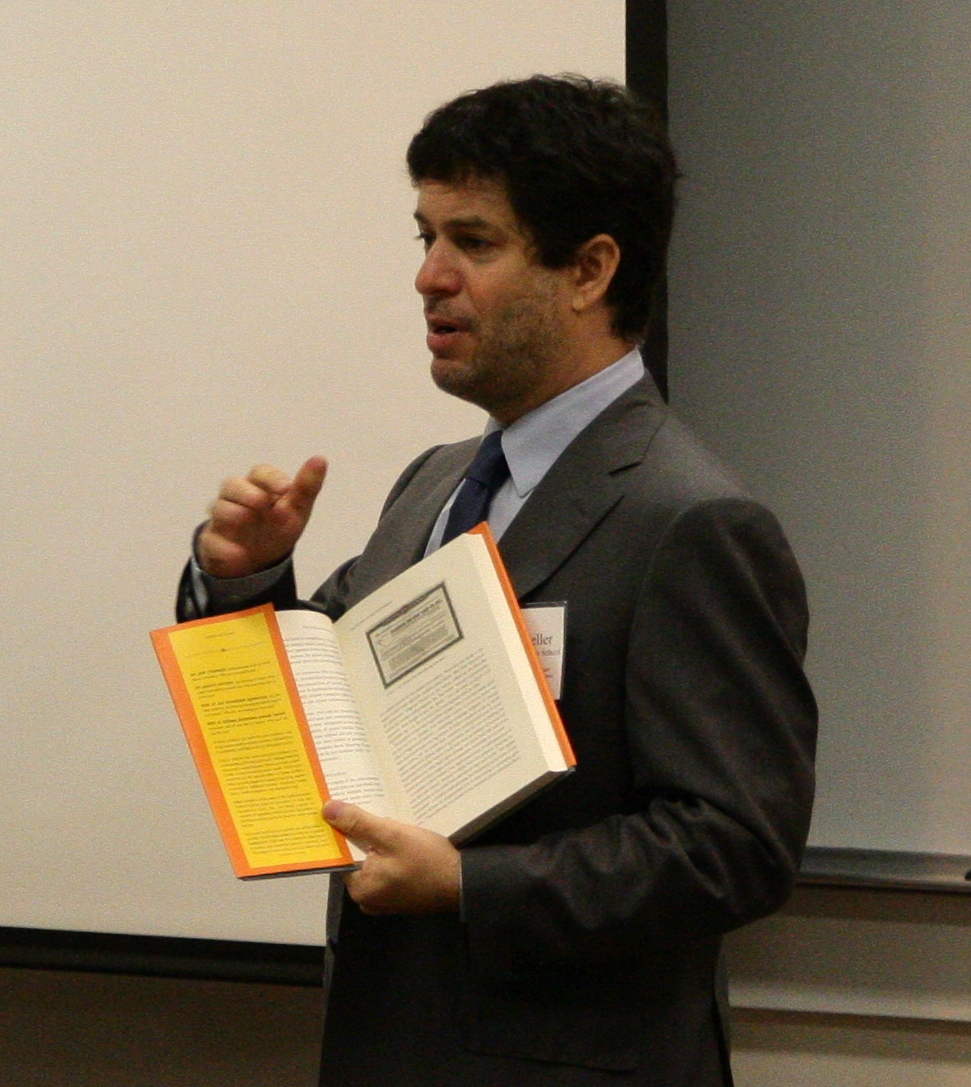
- Education: Harvard University (AB); Stanford University (JD)
- Occupation: Law professor
- Employer: Columbia University
- Spouse: Debora Cahn (m. 2006)

Michael A. Heller is a professor of real estate law at Columbia Law School, specializing in property law. In 1998, while a professor at the University of Michigan Law School he published an article in the Harvard Law Review, "The Tragedy of the Anticommons: Property in the Transition from Marx to Markets." The idea he introduced in that article, the "tragedy of the anticommons" (a term that he coined), sparked a debate among intellectual property theorists that continues to this day.

== Early life and education ==
Heller graduated from Sidwell Friends School in Washington, DC, Harvard College, and Stanford Law School. During law school, he worked as a summer associate at the Washington, DC, law firm of Arnold & Porter LLP.

== Career ==
Heller taught at the University of Michigan Law School from 1994 to 2002, and joined the Columbia Law School faculty in 2002.

Heller’s scholarship has focused on private property laws and international property dilemmas. He published two articles on these topics in 2001: "The Liberal Commons" (with Hanoch Dagan) in the Yale Law Journal, and "A Property Theory Perspective on Russian Enterprise Reform," in Assessing The Rule of Law in Transition Economies. Heller's book, The Gridlock Economy: How Too Much Ownership Wrecks Markets, Stops Innovation, and Costs Lives, was published in 2008.

== Personal life ==
In 2006, he married Debora Cahn. They have one daughter and one son.
