= Charlie Young =

American TV character, created 1999

- The West Wing character
- Dulé Hill as Charlie Young
- First appearance: "A Proportional Response"
- Last appearance: "Tomorrow"
- Created by: Aaron Sorkin
- Portrayed by: Dulé Hill

In-universe information
- Nickname: Charlie
- Gender: Male
- Occupation: Personal Aide to the President (Seasons 1–6), Deputy Special Assistant to the Chief of Staff (Season 6–7)
- Family: Mother (deceased); Deanna Young (sister)
- Nationality: American

Charles Young is a fictional character played by Dulé Hill on the television serial drama The West Wing. For the majority of the series, he is the Personal Aide to President Josiah Bartlet.

== Creation and development ==
The character of Charlie Young was originally to appear in the pilot, with a draft dated February 6, 1998, describing him as a "fresh-faced" 19-year-old who is taking a year off from Georgetown University to work as the President's personal aide. The character was written out of later drafts, and was not introduced in the show until The West Wing's third episode after the all-Caucasian main cast came under criticism from the NAACP. Aged 21 when he enters the White House, the character that made it into the show is slightly older than the early pilot draft called for, and has a somewhat modified history.

Actor Dulé Hill said he decided to audition for the role due to the involvement of Martin Sheen (who portrayed President Bartlet) and show creator Aaron Sorkin, whose work he admired. In preparing for the role, Hill met with his character's real-life counterpart, Kris Engskov, then personal aide to President Bill Clinton. Hill said the experience helped him realize how important and potentially powerful the job was.

Charlie's interracial romance with President Bartlet's daughter sparked hate mail from some viewers, inspiring the first season's cliffhanger in which the President and his staff are fired upon by white supremacists.

The character shares his name with that of African American historical figure Charles Young, the first African-descended American to earn the title of Colonel in the United States Army and the third to graduate from the United States Military Academy at West Point.

== Character biography ==
Charlie Young is introduced in the episode "A Proportional Response" as a young man applying at the White House personnel office for a part-time job as a messenger. He is interviewed by Deborah De LaGuardia who recommends him to Josh Lyman for another job, as the President's personal aide. Prior to this, he had worked as a waiter at the Gramercy Club and for three summers as a golf caddy at Sandy Hook.

Charlie's mother was a police officer in Washington, D.C., who was killed in the line of duty in June 1999. She was not supposed to be working on the night of her death, having been persuaded to switch shifts by Charlie. His father is said to be "long gone," leaving Charlie to look after his younger sister Deena (later called Deanna). Charlie graduated from Theodore Roosevelt High School, a public school in D.C., but later says that he would have preferred to go to Gonzaga College High School, a Catholic school with a better academic reputation and a comparatively crime-free history. Despite achieving high grades at school, Charlie decides to put off attending college, in order to take up a job and support himself and his sister financially until Deena has finished high school. During the summer of 2001, he enrolls at Georgetown University, taking night classes while still keeping up with the demands of his job.

During season one, Charlie begins dating the President's youngest daughter, Zoey Bartlet. Because of this, he receives death threats from white supremacist groups, and is later the target of an assassination attempt while leaving an event in Rosslyn, Virginia. While Charlie is unharmed, Josh Lyman is critically wounded, and the President, the head of the President's Secret Service Detail and a woman in the crowd are all injured less seriously. The two are seen going out on a date once after the assassination attempt, but later break up for reasons unspecified. He develops a renewed interest in Zoey when she returns in season four with a new boyfriend and, even after receiving a Dear John email, refuses to stop pursuing her, stating that he is still in love with her. On the night of Zoey's graduation, he hikes through the National Arboretum to dig up a bottle of champagne the two had buried three years earlier, intending to give it to her as a graduation gift. Instead, he finds Zoey waiting with the champagne, and she confesses that she is confused about him.

Charlie briefly dates Meeshel Anders, played by Gabrielle Union, during season five before learning that she will be working in the White House press room. He later asks Zoey out on a date, and they are subsequently seen sitting next to one another at Zoey's birthday party in the East Room watching Penn and Teller allegedly burn a flag as part of a magic trick. During season six, it is confirmed that they are dating, when the President catches Charlie leaving Zoey's room late at night. The next day, Charlie hints that he has thought about asking Zoey to marry him, but the storyline is never revisited.

At the beginning of season four, C. J. Cregg asks Charlie to become a Big Brother to Anthony Marcus, a troubled young man whose previous Big Brother, Secret Service agent Simon Donovan, has recently been killed. He declines initially until he witnesses Anthony disrespect C. J. to her face saying " I don't need a babysitter bitch are you deaf?" Charlie (while walking by) turns around and slams Anthony against a wall telling him he can "go to juvenile detention or meet me at Cosmo's on Saturday the choice is yours."

Although initially quiet and subservient toward the President and his staff, as Charlie settles into his job he becomes more open with his colleagues and develops a strong rapport and close protective bond with Bartlet. Their relationship shares a greater degree of familiarity and levity not shared by any of the other staff. Bartlet demonstrates his affection for Charlie by giving him the family's carving knife made for Bartlet's ancestors by Paul Revere — the Bartlets having no biological son to inherit the knife — stating that it was something passed down: "My father gave it to me and his father gave it to him, and now I'm giving it to you." This father-son dynamic grows stronger as the show progresses, and following the abduction of Zoey Bartlet, Charlie is the only non-family member to attend a private mass held for the Bartlets.

Charlie displays strong loyalty towards Bartlet and his colleagues, turning down an offer of legal immunity during the President's MS scandal because he feels it would effectively be telling Bartlet that he was wrong to trust him. When a number of gunshots are fired on the White House, he bursts through security into the Oval Office to ensure Bartlet is unhurt.

After graduating from Georgetown, Charlie is forced to make good on a promise he made to the President to move on and leave his job as the President's body man once he graduated, as Bartlet says to Charlie "Let's fatten up that résumé." Charlie finds it hard to leave the White House and begins passing his résumé around the West Wing. C. J. Cregg, the newly appointed Chief of Staff, asks Charlie to stay in the West Wing as a special aide to the Chief of Staff. A man named Curtis replaces Charlie as President Bartlet's body man. As C. J.'s aide, Charlie begins to interact more importantly with the other members of the staff, and starts to have influence in the development of several policy initiatives. Namely, he is encouraged by Leo to fight for a proposed earned income tax credit which would help working families, a measure he calls 'a poor tax' with help from Annabeth Schott.

On the last day of Bartlet's tenure as President of the United States, Charlie reveals to President Bartlet that he has been accepted to the early admission program of Georgetown University Law Center, thanks in part to Bartlet's letter of recommendation. Bartlet gives Charlie one final gift: a copy of the United States Constitution that Bartlet's father had given to him when he was in high school.

== Reception ==
Rica Rodman, who served in the White House press office between 1993 and 1997, says that of all the characters, Charlie is the most realistic in his relationship with the President, "accurately [portraying] the typical young, obliging White House staffer." The Atlantic ranked Charlie the series' ninth best character and praised Hill's performance, writing "Hill was so good in the role—so dryly funny, sharp when he needed to be, who had great chemistry with everyone he worked alongside (particularly Sheen). And he did such an effective job reminding of us Charlie's backstory (his mother was a cop shot in the line of duty) just by flashing a haunted look or reacting with understated but powerful emotion as he becomes a crucial part of the Bartlet family." They did criticize, however, that the character was "backgrounded in later seasons", opining that "the show suffers for it." A Vulture ranking of characters created by Aaron Sorkin ranked Charlie twelfth place.

For his performance in the third season, Hill received a nomination for the Primetime Emmy Award for Outstanding Supporting Actor in a Drama Series. He was nominated alongside co-stars Richard Schiff, John Spencer, and Bradley Whitford; Spencer won the award. In addition, Hill received six consecutive nominations alongside his co-stars for Outstanding Performance by an Ensemble in a Drama Series at the Screen Actors Guild Awards, winning in 2001 and 2002.

== See also ==
- List of characters on The West Wing
- List of The West Wing episodes
