= An Khe (The West Wing) =

- The West Wing episode
- Leo meets Ken by the Jefferson Memorial.
- Episode no.: Season 5 Episode 14
- Directed by: Alex Graves
- Written by: John Wells
- Production code: 176064
- Original air date: February 18, 2004

Guest appearances
- Jesse Bradford; Jay Mohr; Lily Tomlin; Jeffrey DeMunn; Terry O'Quinn; Ron Canada; Brian Kerwin; Carlos Gómez; NiCole Robinson; Allan Kolman; Philip Baker Hall

Episode chronology
← Previous "The Warfare of Genghis Khan"	Next → "Full Disclosure"
- The West Wing season 5

"An Khe" is the 102nd The West Wing episode and 14th of the fifth season. It originally aired on NBC on February 18, 2004. Events circle around the rescue of five US pilots shot down over North Korea. Written by John Wells and directed by Alex Graves, the episode contains guest appearances by Philip Baker Hall, Jeffrey DeMunn and Jay Mohr. It also earned John Spencer an Emmy nomination.

== Plot ==
A US E-2 Hawkeye AEW aircraft goes down over North Korea, and five crew members are lost in enemy territory. President Bartlet, faced with the choice between negotiations with the North Korean government and attempting a rescue operation, chooses the latter. The operation is successful in retrieving the crewmembers, but one of the SEALs dies due to complications from the jump-in. The event brings back memories for Leo about his own time serving in the Vietnam War, when his life was saved by his good friend Kenneth Sean "Ken" O'Neal (DeMunn). Ken, now the CEO of Mueller-Wright Aeronautics, a major defense contractor (and a company Leo also used to work for) is currently having difficulties with the Senate Armed Services committee over a $10 billion (originally just $6 billion) helicopter contract. Leo, in Chicago to present Ken with a humanitarian award, says he will look into it. When Leo confronts the committee's chairman, Arizona senator Matt Hunt (Hall) about the issue, the senator suggests there might be legitimate cause for scrutiny. Infuriated, Leo says that if Hunt calls for a hearing on the issue and has Ken subpoenaed, he will testify himself.

Josh realizes the potential scandal if the White House Chief of Staff were to testify in a case concerning a company where he used to be a senior executive (easily susceptible to accusations of a conflict of interest). Josh tries to explain this, but Leo (in a rather knee-jerk manner) immediately dismisses him without hesitation, saying, "Thanks. I'll take it from here." Unnerved, Josh goes to Toby, and they both come to the conclusion that since Leo cannot be convinced by logic to come around to their position (as Josh says to Toby, "Leo knows he can't testify on behalf of a major defense contractor. What's he thinking?", to which Toby responds, "He's not thinking"), they bypass him and go straight to the Oval Office. The president immediately goes next door to see Leo, upholding his deputy's judgment, and reiterating Josh's reasoning why Leo cannot voluntarily testify, but Leo refuses to back down. At this point Senator Hunt personally shows up at Josh's office unannounced to get Josh to prevent Leo from taking the stand, revealing that O'Neal circumvented a compulsory AoA (Analysis of Alternatives) and hired the Defense Department procurement officer who was overseeing the bidding process at nearly four times his government salary as incentive to secure the contract for Mueller Wright. Josh tries to contact Leo, but Leo has already gone to meet with Ken privately. Ken now comes clean on his transgressions, and says he will take the Fifth Amendment. Leo, devastated, returns to the White House, where he expresses to the president his terrible disappointment with the man he looked up to, and to whom he owes his life. Leo says that many men died saving their lives in Vietnam and they owed it to them to live good and decent lives. Bartlet commiserates, adding that the corruption of the best is always the hardest to take, and that Leo's own life honors the men who died saving him many times over.

In parallel storylines, C.J. finally gives in to the on-air taunts of news show-host Taylor Reid (Mohr), and agrees to do an appearance on his show. After a poor start, she comes back stronger after the commercial break. Reid claims the First Lady violated the terms of the presidential censure by volunteering at an inner-city medical clinic, but C.J. turns the tables by accusing Reid himself of being in the pocket of the pharmaceutical industry. Returning to her office, she learns that she has just missed her college boyfriend Ben Dryer (Brian Kerwin), who came to call on her. Meanwhile, Josh lets intern Ryan Pierce (Jesse Bradford) prepare a presidential briefing on a congressional proposal of a tax cut for stay-at-home moms, but comes off looking bad when he lies about the material and Pierce corrects and contradicts him in front of the president. Also, in a short scene at the very beginning, it becomes clear that the president is less than enthusiastic about the notion of a presidential portrait.

== Social and cultural references ==
Very little is revealed about the title of the episode – An Khe. The only reference to the name is in the opening scene, when Leo, as a Vietnam War fighter pilot, tells ground control that he is approaching An Khê. An Khê was an actual base camp in Vietnam during the war.

The plot line about the defense contracting controversy is apparently based on a real-life incident. A 2003 lease agreement of 100 Boeing K-767 tankers by the US Air Force led to the imprisonment of a Pentagon staffer and the forced resignation of Boeing CEO Phil Condit. The main opponent of the deal was Senator John McCain – from Arizona like the fictional Senator Hunt; in addition, Hunt has been presented on the show as a maverick who is amenable to bipartisan projects, not unlike Senator McCain. McCain, when informed about the West Wing episode, was amused.

Bartlet's quote at the end: "Corruptio optimi pessima", which he then translates "Corruption of the best is the worst" is an old Latin maxim. It can be found in David Hume's "Of Superstition and Enthusiasm" (1741). Other cultural references include Josh calling Ryan "Eve Harrington" after his perceived betrayal. This is a reference to the self-serving protagonist of the 1950 movie All About Eve. At the end of the episode, Bartlet is playing a tape given to him by Crosby, Stills & Nash, visiting the White House to receive the National Medal for the Arts. The song "My Country, 'Tis of Thee" was in fact recorded by Crosby & Nash and can be heard on the album Crosby & Nash.

Leo's statement that the U.S. never signed an armistice with North Korea is actually incorrect. The United Nations Command, headed by the U.S., did sign the Korean Armistice Agreement, along with the North Korean People's Army and Chinese People's Liberation Army. However, no peace treaty between the warring parties was actually signed, which is what Leo might have meant.
