= Full Disclosure (The West Wing) =

- The West Wing episode
- Episode no.: Season 5 Episode 15
- Directed by: Lesli Linka Glatter
- Written by: Lawrence O'Donnell, Jr.
- Production code: 176065
- Original air date: February 25, 2004

Guest appearances
- Jesse Bradford; Jay Mohr; Tim Matheson; Melissa Marsala; James Pickens, Jr.; Sam Robards; NiCole Robinson; Michael Mantell; Ron Dean; Kenneth Kimmins; Frank Ashmore

Episode chronology
← Previous "An Khe"	Next → "Eppur Si Muove"
- The West Wing season 5

"Full Disclosure" is the 103rd episode of The West Wing, and fifteenth of its fifth season. It originally aired on NBC on February 25, 2004. Events circle around a potentially embarrassing magazine interview with former Vice President John Hoynes. Written by Lawrence O'Donnell and directed by Lesli Linka Glatter, the episode contains a guest appearance by James Pickens Jr. "Full Disclosure" is notable for prompting a real-life letter from Senator Hillary Clinton.

== Plot ==
Doing another appearance on Taylor Reid's news show, C.J. gets blind-sided with news about resigned Vice President John Hoynes. A New York Times interview leaked on the internet has him claiming the President and Leo asked him to stay once the sex scandal broke (which, as seen on "Life on Mars", is true). C.J. manages to get a copy of the interview, and it becomes clear that he is trying to portray his former boss and the Chief of Staff in a bad light. When it also emerges that he is writing a book (titled "Full Disclosure"), the White House staff suspect he is planning a presidential run, and that his tactics will involve a smear campaign against the current administration to distance himself and thereby appear in a better light. As a pre-emptive response, they draw up a long and detailed list of Hoynes' worst policy blunders from his time in office, to use if he should decide to campaign at their expense.

C.J., however, seems more than reasonably distressed by the whole incident. She pays Hoynes a visit to give him a warning, and it becomes clear that she was one of the women whom the Vice President sexually harassed. She makes it clear to him that, should he attempt smear tactics against any of these women, she will fight him on it, and he says he had no plans to include information about her in his book. C.J. later relates to Toby how deeply she regretted sleeping with Hoynes. Distressed and in need of comfort, she decides to finally call her college boyfriend Ben, who has been trying to get in touch with her (and been ignored or shunted aside) for some time.

In parallel storylines, Toby has a meeting with union leaders concerned about cheap imports from China – in particular bras. Imposing trade restrictions, however, could be damaging to the US auto industry. Josh has a meeting with the Base Closing Commission. Deciding which military bases to keep and which to shut down is not only politically hazardous, but a job he finds extremely boring. Leaving the room, he comes back to find his intern Ryan in the act of pulling a confidence trick to get a powerful Congressman's favor regarding a base in his district, without his approval. He tells Ryan to clean out his desk but the intern seems to think Josh is kidding in order to throw the Congressman off the track of their "secret plan." When the Democratic mayor of Washington, D.C. (Pickens) comes out in favor of a pilot school voucher program, everybody is surprised, but after taking advice from Charlie about his public school experiences in the city, the president agrees to support the plan.

== Social and cultural references ==
Writer Lawrence O'Donnell, Jr. is a former Washington insider, and the episode carries many references to contemporary political themes. The web site in question, bringing the leak about Hoynes, is the real-life Drudge Report, a political site that made its fame during the Lewinsky scandal. The West Wing had on several occasions been in contact with Matt Drudge, the operator of the site, for permission to use its logo on the series, but been turned down. When the site was used without Drudge's permission, he reportedly reacted with anger. The timing of the episode, however, was fortuitous, in that it coincided with the much-publicised Drudge story about presidential candidate John Kerry's alleged affair with a journalist.

The Democratic Washington mayor coming out in favor for a pilot program of school vouchers, could be based on Mayor Anthony A. Williams, who broke ranks with his party to support a similar scheme by congressional Republicans.

Perhaps the most peculiar fact associated with the episode was a letter by Senator Hillary Clinton and Representative John M. McHugh addressed to show character Josh Lyman, concerning the closing of an upstate New York army base. Josh points out that the deep-snow training base of Fort Drum is relatively useless in a time when most wars take place in desert terrain. Clinton and McHugh wrote a tongue-in-cheek response pointing out flaws in Lyman’s reasoning.
