= The Warfare of Genghis Khan =

- The West Wing episode
- Episode no.: Season 5 Episode 13
- Directed by: Bill D'Elia
- Written by: Peter Noah
- Production code: 176063
- Original air date: February 11, 2004

Guest appearances
- Armin Mueller-Stahl as Prime Minister Efraim Zahavy; Gary Cole as Vice President Bob Russell; Jay Mohr as Taylor Reid; Anna Deavere Smith as Nancy McNally; Terry O'Quinn as General Nicholas Alexander; Steve Ryan as Miles Hutchinson; Christina Chang as Alex Moreau; Renee Estevez as Nancy; Thomas Kopache as Bob Slatterly; Ryan Cutrona as George Rollie; Christopher Maher as the Iranian Ambassador

Episode chronology
← Previous "Slow News Day"	Next → "An Khe"
- The West Wing season 5

"The Warfare of Genghis Khan" is the 101st episode of The West Wing and the 13th of the fifth season. It originally aired on NBC on February 11, 2004. Events circle around the detection of a nuclear detonation over the Indian Ocean, a scenario similar to the Vela incident. Written by Peter Noah and directed by Bill D'Elia, the episode contains guest appearances by Christopher Maher and Christina Chang. It also introduces to the series Armin Mueller-Stahl as Israeli Prime Minister Efraim 'Eli' Zahavy, and gives a first, short glimpse of Jay Mohr as conservative talk-show host Taylor Reid.

== Plot ==
When the characteristic "double-flash" of a nuclear detonation is detected over the Indian Ocean, President Bartlet calls upon his administration to investigate which state has joined the "nuclear club." The administration covertly contacts the governments of Russia and China asking them to communicate with Iran and North Korea, respectively, to ascertain whether either was behind the test. Vice President Russell, who is seeking a more important role within the administration, is briefed on the situation but does not seem to grasp it. North Korea is eventually ruled out, leaving Iran as the most likely suspect and fueling fear that a nuclear weapon could reach the hands of an Islamic terrorist group. Because Iran and the U.S. do not maintain official diplomatic relations, the President calls Iran's ambassador to the UN from New York to the Swiss embassy in Washington. Leo McGarry grills the ambassador over Iran's nuclear program, but he rebuffs their accusations and gives no conclusive indications that Iran was behind the test.

We're the most dominant nation on Earth, but too often the face of our economic superiority is a corporate imperialism or technological dominance shown by smart bombs and Predator drones. We could do something else. Something generous and uplifting for all humankind. We could send the first representatives from Earth to walk on another planet. We could land people on Mars...

Voyager, in case it's ever encountered by extraterrestrials, is carrying photos of life on Earth, greetings in 55 languages, and a collection of music, from Gregorian chants to Chuck Berry, including "Dark was the Night, Cold was the Ground" by '20s bluesman Blind Willie Johnson, whose stepmother blinded him at [age] seven by throwing lye in his eyes, after his father beat her for being with another man. He died penniless of pneumonia after sleeping bundled in wet newspapers in the ruins of his house that burned down, but his music just left the Solar System.

— Josh Lyman

Nevertheless, the administration remains suspicious and the President orders B-2s scrambled for potential simultaneous air strikes on five Iranian uranium enrichment facilities. McGarry tells Communications Director Toby Ziegler to have a statement ready once the strikes are carried out, as Ziegler unsuccessfully tries to convince McGarry that the situation would be better handled by the UN. Vice President Russell steps in, recounting to the President and the Joint Chiefs an encounter he had with a drunken Israeli government official who revealed that the country had secretly developed its own nuclear submarines. Russell surmises that Israel (which, having developed nuclear weapons technology years ago, would have no apparent reason to perform a test) needed to test a weapon that had been miniaturized to fit on a submarine-based missile, earning new respect for himself within the administration. The President calls off the air strike, averting an international crisis, and invites the Israeli Prime Minister to Washington under the pretext of discussing the settlement of the West Bank. President Bartlet shares his concerns over proliferation and escalation with the Prime Minister, who says that the submarines are part of an essential second-strike capability against Iran, which he is certain will eventually develop nuclear weapons.

A subplot throughout the episode consists of NASA officials trying to convince Josh Lyman to push the administration and Congress to authorize funding for a potential human mission to Mars. At first, Lyman harshly dismisses the idea, citing high costs and a recent string of technical failures by the agency. However, an attractive female administrator (Christina Chang) takes him stargazing and rekindles his enthusiasm for space exploration, and he composes an inspiring speech in support of the idea. The episode ends with shots of Lyman looking through a telescope into the night sky and President Bartlet watching the satellite feed of the nuclear test in the Situation Room as "Dark was the Night, Cold was the Ground" plays, juxtaposing the possibilities made accessible by modern technology for both innovation and advancement, as well as for violence and destruction.

In another development, a conservative television pundit, Taylor Reid (Jay Mohr), chides Press Secretary C.J. Cregg, who feels somewhat neglected by the administration.

== Cultural references ==
The nuclear test plotline is similar to the real-life 1979 Vela incident, in which a flash was reportedly "detected" by only a single satellite in the southern Indian Ocean (although it was reportedly observable by another such satellite), with the initial suspicion being that it was the result of a South African or Israeli nuclear test.

The NASA subplot includes an official mentioning to Josh the need to launch a probe by a certain time so it can perform a gravitational slingshot at Jupiter and explore the Kuiper belt. While not named, this describes the real-life New Horizons mission, which, at the time of this episode, was facing administration opposition and a looming launch window for the purpose of a gravity assist from Jupiter. Coincidentally with the debate conducted in the subplot, the actual New Horizons mission garnered significant positive publicity for NASA, including display of Pluto images in Times Square.

Josh mentions Voyager 1 crossing the termination shock, which was reported to have begun around the original air date of the episode.

The Webb Telescope is also mentioned in a conversation between Josh and Moreau; the telescope was finally launched on 25 December 2021, almost 18 years after this episode first aired.

== Music ==
During the episode, it was mentioned that the song "Dark Was the Night, Cold Was the Ground" by Blind Willie Johnson, had just left the Solar System aboard Voyager 1. The song plays at the end of the episode.
