= A Proportional Response =

- The West Wing episode
- Episode no.: Season 1 Episode 3
- Directed by: Marc Buckland
- Written by: Aaron Sorkin
- Production code: 225902
- Original air date: October 6, 1999

Guest appearance
- John Amos as Percy Fitzwallace

Episode chronology
← Previous "Post Hoc, Ergo Propter Hoc"	Next → "Five Votes Down"
- The West Wing season 1

"A Proportional Response" is the third episode of the first season of The West Wing, an American serial television drama. The episode aired on October 6, 1999 on NBC. The episode centers around the continuation of a storyline introduced in the previous episode, in which a plane carrying a new friend of President Bartlet was attacked by the Syrian government. The episode also sees the introduction of Dulé Hill as Charlie Young, and an argument between C. J. Cregg and Sam Seaborn over Sam's decision to befriend a call girl.

== Cast ==
- Martin Sheen as Josiah Bartlet, the President of the United States
- John Spencer as Leo McGarry, the White House Chief of Staff
- Bradley Whitford as Josh Lyman, the Deputy White House Chief of Staff
- Janel Moloney as Donna Moss, the assistant to Josh Lyman
- Dulé Hill as Charlie Young, the Personal Aide to the President
- Richard Schiff as Toby Ziegler, the White House Communications Director
- Allison Janney as C. J. Cregg, the White House Press Secretary
- Rob Lowe as Sam Seaborn, the Deputy White House Communications Director

== Plot ==
"A Proportional Response" is a continuation of a storyline that began in the previous episode, "Post Hoc, Ergo Propter Hoc": a plane carrying a new friend of President Bartlet was blown up by the Syrian government. The president's military advisors recommend that he simply respond with a proportional military incursion, bombing several highly-rated military targets, but he rejects this idea, asking "what is the virtue of a proportional response"? He angrily demands that his advisors come up with something far more drastic. But when they do present that plan – an airport bombing with thousands of civilian casualties – he reluctantly picks the initial, proportional bombing instead.

This episode also introduces Charlie Young, a young Black man who came to the White House looking for a job as a messenger. Instead, deputy White House Chief of Staff Josh Lyman persuades him to take a job as personal aide to the president. He agrees to take the job in the Oval Office, just before the president addresses the nation on television following the successful bombings.

Meanwhile, C. J. Cregg, the White House press secretary, has learned that deputy Communications Director Sam Seaborn is friends with a call girl. After excoriating Josh Lyman for not telling her earlier, she has an argument with Sam about the optics of the friendship. C. J. reminds Sam that he works for the White House, and that any story involving him and a call girl will be terrible for the president. Sam counters that he hasn't actually done anything wrong, and that C. J. should have the courage to stand up to members of the press who believe that it's the public's right to know who he's friends with.

== Reaction and trivia ==
As mentioned above, "A Proportional Response" sees the introduction of Dulé Hill to the cast of The West Wing as Charlie; he was cast in the role after the NAACP criticized the show for not including any people of color. Hill reflected on the episode in 2017, in an interview on his new role as Angelo, the villain of Sleight; he quipped that he did not think his new, nefarious character would even understand the definition of "a proportional response".

Stephen Thompson and Christina Tucker, recording a piece for NPR, touch on the episode as an example of how The West Wing can present itself realistically, rather than its usual perception of idealism. Thompson questioned why the show would be perceived as idealistic at all, when he perceived most of the policy dilemmas on the show as realistic; the two bad choices in responding to Syria's aggression, exemplified by Leo's musing of "there is no good; it's what there is", match with the show's basic theme of picking the lesser of two evils. Thompson, in answering his own question, said that he realized that it was the show's characters who were portrayed idealistically, in that they always strove to do the right thing rather than what was politically advantageous.

Eleanor Robertson, writing for stuff.co.nz, focused on a line of dialogue in which C. J. calls Josh an "elitist, Harvard, fascist, missed-the-Dean's-list-two-semesters-in-a-row Yankee jackass!". She mentioned the line as one of "TV's best comebacks against sexist nonsense". While Robertson proclaims herself to be "the world's leading advocate for Aaron Sorkin to rack off down a very deep hole", she praises the dialogue, remarking that it was satisfying to watch a woman refer to a man as a "fascist". Robertson remarks that the line proves that women are best suited for calling out injustices performed by the Man.

Steve Heisler, writing for The A.V. Club, gave the episode a "B+". Liz Miller, writing for IndieWire, listed "A Proportional Response" as one of "15(ish) episodes of The West Wing to binge view in celebration of America". She praised its "classic West Wing moment" in the final scene, a scene meant to inspire viewers and praise public service.
