= Paula Yoo =

American journalist, author and screenwriter

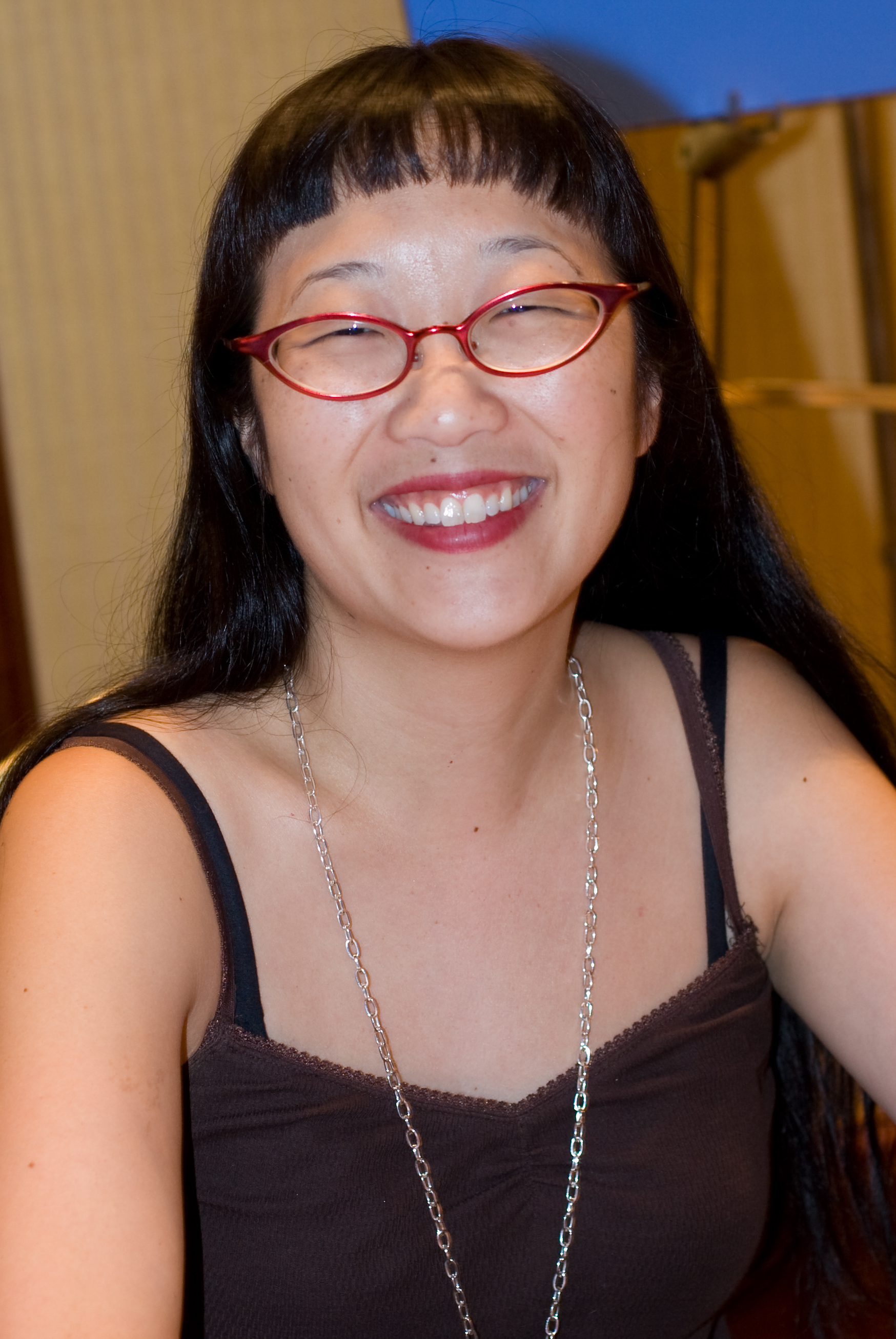
- At SCBWI-LA Writer's Day in 2008
- Born: Virginia, United States
- Education: Avon High School; Columbia University's Graduate School of Journalism (MA)
- Notable work: From a Whisper to a Rallying Cry: The Killing of Vincent Chin and the Trial that Galvanized the Asian American Movement

Paula Yoo is an American journalist, children's and young adult's author, and television screenwriter. She is also a professional freelance violinist and has performed with classical orchestras and contemporary rock bands.

== Early life and education ==
Yoo was born in Virginia, United States, and is of Korean descent. She was educated at Avon High School in Avon, Connecticut, United States. She studied a master's degree at Columbia University's Graduate School of Journalism, graduating in 1992.

== Career ==
=== Journalism ===
As a journalist, Yoo worked for publications including the Detroit News, Seattle Times and People magazine.

=== Screenwriting ===
As a television screenwriter, Yoo has writing credits for television shows including Supergirl, Mozart in the Jungle, and The West Wing. She was co-executive producer of Supergirl and Pretty Little Liars: The Perfectionists.

=== Children's and young adult books ===
Yoo's debut children's narrative nonfiction book Sixteen Years in Sixteen Seconds: The Sammy Lee Story was an Honor Book at the 2006 Asian/Pacific American Awards for Literature (APAAL), awarded by the Asian Pacific American Librarians Association (APALA).

Yoo's book My Kite is Stuck! and Other Stories was a finalist for the 2017 Cybils Award.

Yoo's young adult book From a Whisper to a Rallying Cry: The Killing of Vincent Chin and the Trial that Galvanized the Asian American Movement won the Children's Literature Council of Southern California's 2022 Peggy Miller Award for Young Adult Literature, won the Chinese American Librarians Association's 2022 Best Young Adult Non-fiction Book Award, and won the 2021 Nonfiction Boston Globe–Horn Book Award. The book was also a finalist for the 2022 Young Adult Library Services Association (YALSA)'s Award for Excellence in Nonfiction and was longlisted for the National Book Award for Young People's Literature. It recounts the 1982 killing of Vincent Chin and the impact this had on Asian American people.

Yoo's young adult book Rising from the Ashes: Los Angeles, 1992. Edward Jae Song Lee, Latasha Harlins, Rodney King, and a City on Fire narrates the 1992 Los Angeles uprising from multiple points of view in the Korean American and Black communities.

Other works by Yoo include Good Enough, Twenty-Two Cents: The Story of Muhammad Yunus (co-written with Jamel Akib), Shining Star: The Anna May Wong Story and titles in the Confetti Kids picture book series.

=== Music ===
Yoo also works as a professional violinist and has performed with both classical orchestras and contemporary rock bands, such as Love, Fun and No Doubt.

Yoo supports organisations including the Orlando Youth Alliance, Stop AAPI Hate and We Need Diverse Books.
