= Debora Cahn =

American writer and producer

- Education: Barnard College
- Occupations: Television producer; writer
- Known for: Homeland; The Diplomat
- Spouse: Michael Heller (m. 2006)

Debora Cahn is an American television writer and producer. She was a writer and executive producer on the Showtime series Homeland for its final two seasons (2018–2020), and is the creator, executive producer and showrunner of the Netflix political thriller series The Diplomat. She was previously a writer and producer for The West Wing (2002–2006) and Grey's Anatomy (2006–2013). Cahn has won two Writers Guild of America Awards from multiple nominations.

== Early and personal life ==
Cahn graduated from Barnard College of Columbia University, and received a master's degree in acting from the Institute for Advanced Theater Training at Harvard University. Her father was a nuclear physicist, and her mother was a clinical psychologist. In 2006, Cahn married Michael Heller. They have one daughter and one son.

== Career ==
Cahn began her career as a writer and producer on The West Wing from its fourth to seventh and final season (2002–2006). From 2006 to 2013, she was a writer and producer of Grey's Anatomy. She was a writer and co-executive producer for Martin Scorsese's HBO series Vinyl (2016). In 2018, she wrote the HBO film Paterno, starring Al Pacino and directed by Barry Levinson. She was a writer and executive producer on the Showtime series Homeland for its final two seasons (2018–2020). She was also a writer and consulting producer on FX's Fosse/Verdon (2019), for which she won a Writers Guild of America Award for Best Adapted Long Form Television.

In 2022, Cahn signed a multi-year overall deal with Netflix. Under the deal, she created and is serving as executive producer and showrunner on the political thriller drama series The Diplomat.

Cahn's production company is Let's Not Turn This Into a Whole Big Production.

== Awards and nominations ==
In 2005, Cahn won the Writers Guild of America Award for Television: Episodic Drama for the West Wing's fifth-season episode "The Supremes". In 2006 and 2007, Cahn was part of the writing staff for two television series nominated for the Primetime Emmy Award for Outstanding Drama Series and the Writers Guild of America Award for Television: Dramatic Series; The West Wing in 2006 and Grey's Anatomy in 2007. In 2020, Cahn won the Best Adapted Long Form Television for Fosse/Verdon.

In 2026, she received a nomination for Outstanding Writing for a Drama Series with Peter Ackerman for their work on "Amagansett" episode of The Diplomat in 78th Primetime Emmy Awards.

== Filmography ==
Television filmography
Year	Title	Creator	Writer	Executive producer	Notes
2002–2006	The West Wing	No	Yes	Producer	Wrote 15 episodes in seasons 4-7
2006–2013	Grey's Anatomy	No	Yes	Co-executive	Wrote 17 episodes in seasons 3-10
2008–2009	Private Practice	No	Yes	No	Wrote 2 episodes in seasons 3 and 4
2016	Vinyl	No	Yes	Co-executive	Wrote 3 episodes
2018–2020	Homeland	No	Yes	Yes	Wrote 5 episodes in seasons 7 and 8
2019	Fosse/Verdon	No	Yes	Consulting	Wrote 1 episode
2023–present	The Diplomat	Yes	Yes	Yes	Wrote 13 episodes

Film filmography
Year	Title	Director	Writer	Producer
2018	Paterno	No	Yes	No
