= Five Votes Down =

- The West Wing episode
- Episode no.: Season 1 Episode 4
- Directed by: Michael Lehmann
- Story by: Lawrence O'Donnell Jr.; Patrick Caddell
- Teleplay by: Aaron Sorkin
- Production code: 225903
- Original air date: October 13, 1999

Guest appearances
- Michael McGuire as Congressman Cal Tillinghouse; Thom Barry as Congressman Mark Richardson; Janel Moloney as Donna Moss; Jay Underwood as Congressman Christopher Wick; Mark Blum as Rep. Katzenmoyer; Sara Botsford as Jenny McGarry; Jillian Armenante as Leela; Tim Matheson as Vice President John Hoynes; Kathryn Joosten as Dolores Landingham

Episode chronology
← Previous "A Proportional Response"	Next → "The Crackpots and These Women"
- The West Wing season 1

"Five Votes Down" is the fourth episode of The West Wing. The episode aired on October 13, 1999 on NBC. Presidential chief of staff Leo McGarry needs five more House votes to pass a bill restricting the sale of automatic firearms—but the cost might be too high, especially if he has to go to the unpredictable Vice President to help put them over the top. The staff's annual financial disclosure statements prove to be thorny for Toby, whose innocent technology stock purchase last year proved to be wildly profitable, which raises eyebrows due to his association with an expert in the field. In addition, Leo's long hours on the job cause an unforeseen crisis at home, and the President unintentionally mixes up the potent medications he receives for his ailing back.

== Plot ==
While President Josiah Bartlet delivers a speech priding the inevitable passage of a gun control bill in the House, his staff learns that said passage is in jeopardy. Chief of Staff Leo McGarry calls an emergency meeting in which he instructs C.J. Cregg to play up the release of the staff's financial disclosure report to provide cover for them to work on getting the votes. Sam suggests using the Vice President, but Leo shoots down this idea. When Leo finally arrives home, he finds his wife still awake, having expected Leo home hours before. He also realizes he has completely forgotten it was their wedding anniversary.

The disclosure report brings with it a number of comical revelations (including a valuable smoking jacket given to Josh from an ex-girlfriend). It also brings with it some trouble—the report reveals that a stock Toby invested in went from $5,000 to over $125,000, soon after he had arranged for a friend to testify before Congress about stocks. Toby insists he had no idea what his friend was going to testify about, and it was an innocent coincidence. Nevertheless, with the report being made public, there is concern he may be indicted on federal charges of manipulating the stock market. Sam suggests that they announce Toby will avoid any potential legal and political landmines at the expense of cashing out his stocks the next day and dropping his salary to a dollar for the next year, to which a drugged-out President Bartlet agrees. This led a stunned Toby to tell the rest of the senior staff that he feels "like I just got screwed with my pants on."

Josh manages to strong-arm one of the five defecting Congressmen into getting back in line by threatening that the President will not endorse him in the Midterms. This action prompts two other defectors to switch their votes back. Josh then meets with Congressman Christopher Wick, an old college fraternity buddy, whom he angrily confronts about going against the President. Wick replies that he broke ranks to prove he's not on a leash, but he'll change his vote again for a photo op with the President. Josh, disgusted by the Congressman's motives, nonetheless complies with his wishes.

Leo again vetoes the suggestion of using Hoynes to speak with Texas Congressman Cal Tillinghouse. Instead, Leo approaches Congressman Mark Richardson, an African American, with an appeal that the gun ban will save African American lives. The Congressman rebuffs Leo, saying the law has no teeth and is nothing more than for show.

Leo reluctantly must now turn to the Vice President. He schedules the meeting for late, wanting to spend most of the evening with his wife to make up for his lapse the night before; he had spent the day planning an in-house dinner for the two, at one point buying her a pearl choker by Harry Winston. When he arrives home, however, he finds Jenny, with her bags packed. She announces she's leaving him, that she can no longer bear the life they have. Leo, distraught over the thought of her leaving him, still insists his job is more important than their marriage.

Shaken, Leo meets with Hoynes, who immediately realizes something is wrong. Leo confides in Hoynes, and the VP tells Leo about a secret AA meeting he hosts with several other prominent politicians and administrators, inviting him to come. He also says he will be happy to speak with Tillinghouse.

The following day, Hoynes makes good on his promise, convincing Tillinghouse to go along with the bill as a personal favor to him, stating directly that the Congressman would be wise to do what he asks because "one day I'll be President...and you won't be." He also encourages Tillinghouse to speak with the four other Congressmen who were compelled to vote yes (all of whom are looking for a little political retribution). After the bill is signed, all five of the Congressmen pile the credit upon the Vice President, making the victory more hollow for President Bartlet. Most of the staff are upset with this result and realize that asking Hoynes would lead to a PR sacrifice, however Leo ends by saying that it was hubris on the part of the President and his staff. Josh later congratulates Hoynes on a game well played.

The episode ends with Leo attending the AA meeting.

== Production notes ==
The cold open of this episode features one of the longest and most ambitious steadicam walk-and-talk scenes of the series. Over four minutes in length, it was shot on location at The Ambassador Hotel in Los Angeles.

Director of photography Tom Del Ruth recalls, "It started out on the dance floor, went into the lobby, through the top-floor kitchen area, down two flights of stairs into the bowels of the kitchen and through the cavernous kitchen, where food was being prepared for a banquet. We worked our way through that area, went down another flight of stairs to where the laundry facilities are, then proceeded into the catacombs, all the way through the base of the hotel and out into the parking lot, where we ended up in a motorcade. The shot involved more than 500 extras and nearly all of the major cast members, and it was all done in one seamless Steadicam shot. Each take required one magazine of film, and the actors had to pass off dialogue from one person to another. It required quite a bit of orchestration. It was about a five-page scene and took us half the night [to shoot]." This required steadicam operator Dave Chameides to walk backwards at full speed for over thirteen takes, nearly collapsing in exhaustion by the end of the shoot.

== Emmy awards ==
John Spencer was nominated for Outstanding Supporting Actor in a Drama Series for his work in this episode.
