= Personal aide to the president of the United States =

Personal assistants to the President of the US

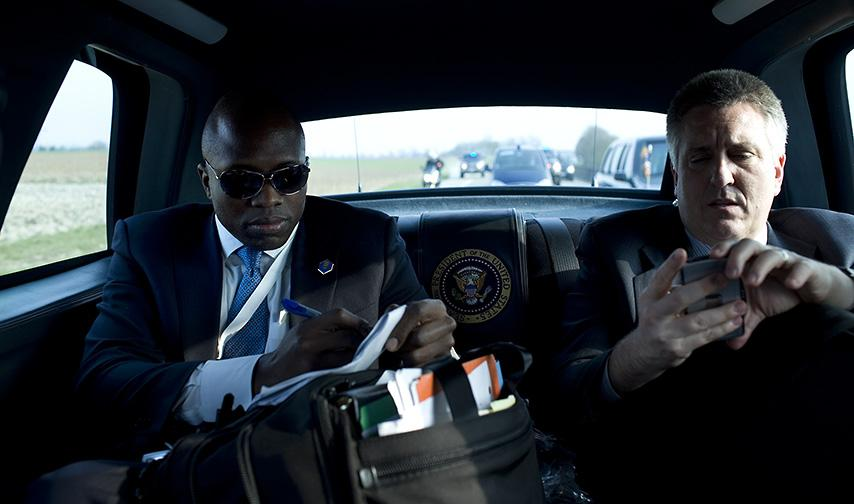
Reggie Love, left, Barack Obama's body man from 2009 to 2011, is seen here in a presidential motorcade outside Strasbourg for the 2009 NATO summit

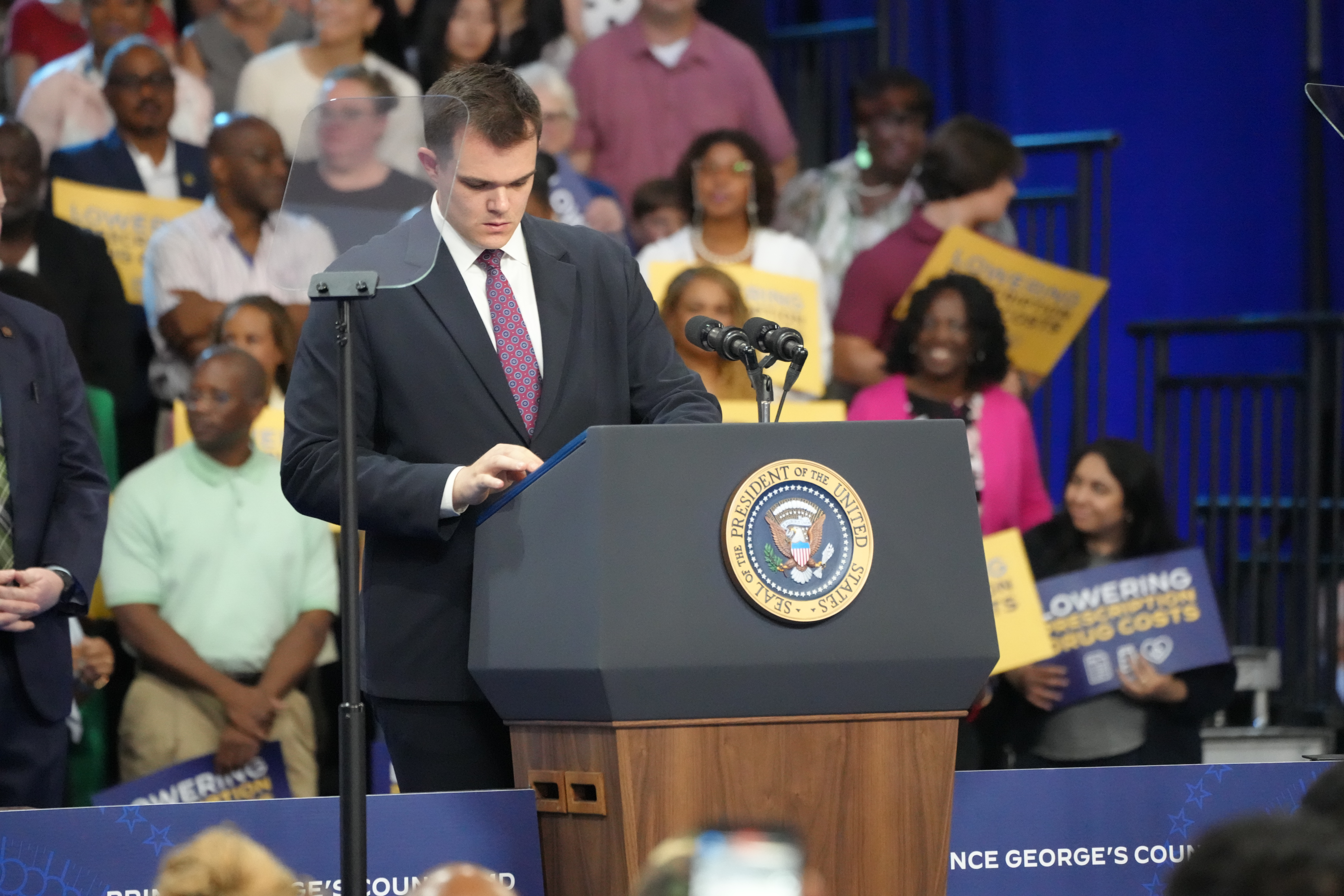
President Biden's personal aide Jacob Spreyer prepares the podium for a presidential speech.

A personal assistant who accompanies the president of the United States virtually everywhere is generally referred to as a body man or body woman, but in some cases may be referred to as a personal aide. These personal aides to the president are often responsible for arranging and providing: lodging; transportation; interactions with media, public, and family; meals; personal briefings and briefing papers; logistical instructions; speech cards; snacks; cell phones; and any other necessary assistance. Such personal aides exist for many politicians aside from presidents, but the most famous have included personal aides to the president, as described below.

== History ==
Upon taking office in 1969, Richard Nixon expanded and professionalized the White House Office staff. A new position was created: personal aide to the president. Previously this role had largely been filled by a White House valet. This role remained, but unlike the valet, the personal aide to the president travels wherever the president goes whereas the valet always remains stationed at the White House.

== List ==
=== President Richard Nixon ===
- Stephen Bull

=== President Gerald Ford ===
- Terrence O’Donnell
- Gregory Willard

=== President Jimmy Carter ===
- Timothy Kraft
- Phil Wise

=== President Ronald Reagan ===
- David Fischer
- Jim Kuhn

=== President George H. W. Bush ===
- Timothy McBride
- Michal Dannenhauer
- David Bates
- Tom Frechette

=== President Bill Clinton ===
- Douglas Band
- Kris Engskov

=== President George W. Bush ===
- Logan Walters
- Blake Gottesman
- Jared Weinstein
- Freddy Ford
- Sam Sutton
- Fidel Medina

=== President Barack Obama ===
- Reggie Love
- Marvin Nicholson

=== President Donald Trump (First administration) ===
- John McEntee (2017–2018)
- Jordan Karem (2018–2019)
- Nick Luna (2019–2021)

=== President Joe Biden ===
- Stephen Goepfert (2021–2022)
- Jacob Spreyer (2022–2025)

=== President Donald Trump (Second administration) ===
- Christopher Ambrosini (2025–present)

== In popular culture ==
This role has been portrayed in fiction:

- Dulé Hill as Charlie Young, in The West Wing
- Tony Hale as Gary Walsh, in Veep
- Samantha Mathis as Janie Basdin, in The American President

== See also ==
- Aide-de-camp, a military assistant to a senior official
- White House social aide
- White House Military Office
- Road manager, performing similar duties for an entertainer or celebrity
