= Aaron Sorkin =

American screenwriter, playwright, and filmmaker (born 1961)

- Sorkin in 2026
- Born: Aaron Benjamin Sorkin; June 9, 1961 (age 65); New York City, U.S.
- Education: Syracuse University (BFA)
- Occupations: Film director; screenwriter; playwright
- Spouse: Julia Bingham (m. 1996; div. 2005)
- Children: 1
- Writing career
- Years active: 1984–present
- Notable awards: Full list

Aaron Benjamin Sorkin (born June 9, 1961) is an American screenwriter, playwright, and filmmaker. As a writer for stage, television, and film, he is recognized for his fast-paced dialogue and extended monologues, complemented by frequent use of the storytelling technique called the "walk and talk". Sorkin has earned numerous accolades including an Academy Award, a BAFTA Award, five Primetime Emmy Awards, three Golden Globes, and two WGA Awards, in addition to a Laurence Olivier Award nomination.

Born in New York City, Sorkin developed a passion for writing at an early age. He rose to prominence as a writer-creator and showrunner of the television series Sports Night (1998–2000), The West Wing (1999–2006), Studio 60 on the Sunset Strip (2006–2007), and The Newsroom (2012–2014). He is also known for his work on Broadway, including the plays A Few Good Men (1989), The Farnsworth Invention (2007), To Kill a Mockingbird (2018), and the revival of Lerner and Loewe's musical Camelot (2023).

He wrote the film screenplays for A Few Good Men (1992), The American President (1995), and several biopics, including Charlie Wilson's War (2007), Moneyball (2011), and Steve Jobs (2015). For writing The Social Network (2010), he won the Academy Award for Best Adapted Screenplay. He made his directorial film debut with Molly's Game (2017), followed by The Trial of the Chicago 7 (2020), Being the Ricardos (2021), and The Social Reckoning (2026), which serves as a standalone sequel to The Social Network.

== Early life ==
Sorkin was born in Manhattan, New York City, to a Jewish family, on June 9, 1961. He was raised in the New York suburb of Scarsdale. His mother was a schoolteacher and his father a copyright lawyer who had fought in World War II and went to college on the G.I. Bill; both his older sister and brother went on to become lawyers. His paternal grandfather was one of the founders of the International Ladies' Garment Workers' Union (ILGWU). His older brother, Daniel, died at birth and Aaron has referred to himself as the "understudy."

For his bar mitzvah, Sorkin asked his rabbi to record the Hebrew passage rather than follow the usual Torah-study preparation, and learned it by ear; he later cited the episode as an early example of his ear for language.

Sorkin took an early interest in acting. During childhood, his parents took him to the theatre to see shows such as Who's Afraid of Virginia Woolf? and That Championship Season. In the eighth grade, he played General Bullmoose in the musical Li'l Abner. He attended Scarsdale High School where he became involved in the drama and theatre club. At Scarsdale High, he served as vice president of the drama club in his junior and senior years, and graduated in 1979.

In 1979, Sorkin attended Syracuse University. In his freshman year, he failed a class that was a core requirement, which caused a setback because he wanted to be an actor, and the drama department did not allow students to take the stage until they completed the core classes. Determined to do better, he returned for his sophomore year, and graduated in 1983 with a Bachelor of Fine Arts degree in musical theatre. Recalling the influence of theatre teacher Arthur Storch, Sorkin said: "Arthur's reputation as a director, and as a disciple of Lee Strasberg, was a big reason why a lot of us went to S.U. [Syracuse University]... 'You have the capacity to be so much better than you are', he started saying to me in September of my senior year. He was still saying it in May. On the last day of classes, he said it again, and I said, 'How?', and he answered, 'Dare to fail'. I've been coming through on his admonition ever since".

== Career ==
=== 1983–1990: Early work and breakthrough ===
I don't want to analyze myself or anything, but I think, in fact I know this to be true, that I enter the world through what I write. I grew up believing, and continue to believe, that I am a screw-up, that growing up with my family and friends, I had nothing to offer in any conversation. But when I started writing, suddenly there was something that I brought to the party that was at a high-enough level.

— Sorkin on becoming a writer

Sorkin moved to New York City where he spent much of the 1980s as a struggling, sporadically employed actor who worked odd jobs, such as delivering singing telegrams, driving a limousine, touring Alabama with the children's theatre company Traveling Playhouse, handing out flyers promoting a hunting-and-fishing show, and bartending at Broadway's Palace Theatre. One weekend, while house-sitting for a friend, he found a typewriter, started typing, and "felt a phenomenal confidence and a kind of joy that [he] had never experienced before in [his] life".

He continued writing and eventually put together his first play, Removing All Doubt, which he sent to Arthur Storch, his former theatre teacher, who was impressed. In 1984, Removing All Doubt was staged for drama students at Sorkin's alma mater, Syracuse University. After that, he wrote Hidden in This Picture which debuted Off-Off-Broadway at Steve Olsen's West Bank Cafe Downstairs Theatre Bar in 1988. The quality of his first two plays earned him a theatrical agent. Producer John A. McQuiggan saw the production of Hidden in This Picture and commissioned Sorkin to turn the one-act into a full-length play called Making Movies.

Sorkin was inspired to write his next play, a courtroom drama called A Few Good Men, from a phone conversation with his sister Deborah, who had graduated from Boston University Law School and signed up for a three-year stint with the U.S. Navy Judge Advocate General's Corps. Deborah told Sorkin that she was going to Guantanamo Bay to defend a group of Marines who came close to killing a fellow Marine in a hazing ordered by a superior officer. Sorkin took that information and wrote much of his story on cocktail napkins while bartending at the Palace Theatre. When he returned home, he would transcribe the story and notes onto the computer, forming a basis from which he wrote many drafts for A Few Good Men.

In 1988, Sorkin sold the film rights for A Few Good Men to producer David Brown before it premiered, in a deal that was reportedly "well into six figures". Brown had read an article in The New York Times about Sorkin's one-act play Hidden in This Picture, and found out Sorkin had a play that was having Off Broadway readings. Brown produced A Few Good Men on Broadway at the Music Box Theatre. It starred Tom Hulce and was directed by Don Scardino. After opening in late 1989, it ran for 497 performances. Sorkin continued writing Making Movies and in 1990 it debuted Off-Broadway at the Promenade Theatre, produced by John McQuiggan, and directed by Don Scardino. Meanwhile, Brown was producing for TriStar Pictures, and tried to interest them in adapting A Few Good Men into a film, but his proposal was declined due to the lack of star actor involvement. Brown later received a phone call from Alan Horn at Castle Rock Entertainment who was eager to make the film. Rob Reiner, a Castle Rock producing partner, opted to direct.

=== 1991–1997: Writing for Castle Rock Entertainment ===
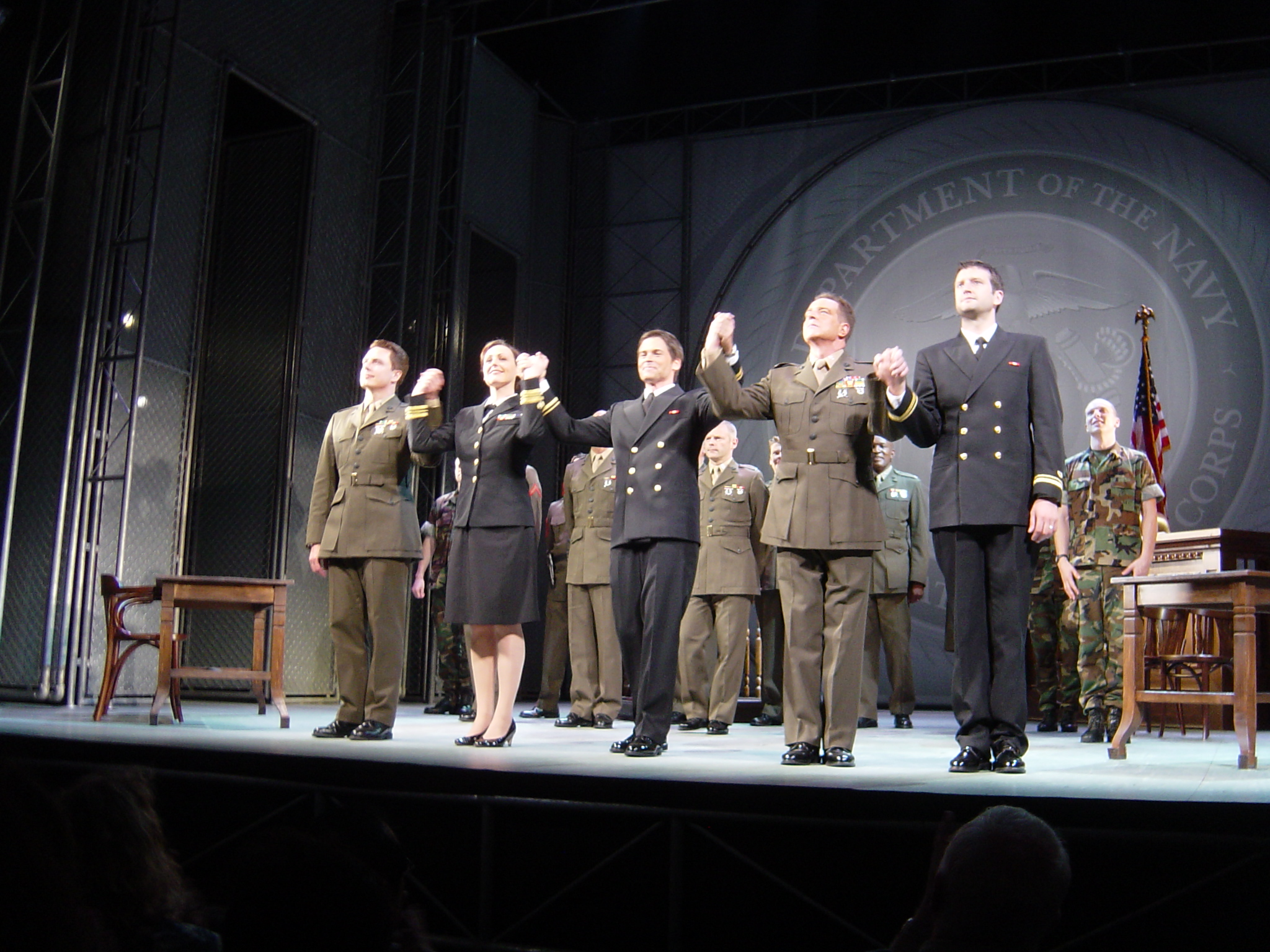
A Few Good Men at London's Theatre Royal Haymarket on August 31, 2005.

Sorkin worked under contract for Castle Rock Entertainment, where he befriended colleagues William Goldman and Rob Reiner, and met his future wife Julia Bingham, who was one of Castle Rock's business affairs lawyers. Sorkin wrote several drafts of the script for A Few Good Men in his Manhattan apartment, learning the craft from a book about screenplay format. He then spent several months at the Los Angeles offices of Castle Rock, working on the script with Reiner. Goldman, who regularly worked under contract at Castle Rock, became his mentor and helped him to adapt his stage play into a screenplay. The film, directed by Reiner, starred Tom Cruise, Jack Nicholson, Demi Moore and Kevin Bacon, and was produced by Brown. A Few Good Men was released in 1992 and was a box office success, grossing $243 million worldwide.

Goldman also approached Sorkin with a story premise, which Sorkin developed into the script for the thriller Malice. Goldman oversaw the project as creative consultant while Sorkin wrote the first two drafts. However, he had to leave the project to finish the script for A Few Good Men, so screenwriter Scott Frank stepped in and wrote two drafts of the Malice screenplay. When production on A Few Good Men was completed, Sorkin resumed working on Malice right through the final shooting script. Harold Becker directed the 1993 film, which starred Nicole Kidman and Alec Baldwin. Malice had mixed reviews; Vincent Canby in The New York Times described the film as "deviously entertaining from its start through its a finish". Critic Roger Ebert gave it 2 out of 4 stars, and Peter Travers in a 2000 Rolling Stone review summarized it as having "suspense but no staying power".

Sorkin's last screenplay under Castle Rock was The American President. Once again he worked with Goldman, who served as a creative consultant. It took Sorkin several years to write the screenplay for The American President, which started off at 385 pages; it was eventually reduced to a standard shooting script of around 120 pages. The film, also directed by Reiner, was critically acclaimed; Kenneth Turan of the Los Angeles Times described it as "genial and entertaining if not notably inspired", and believed its most interesting aspects were the "pipe dreams about the American political system and where it could theoretically be headed." A Few Good Men, Malice and The American President grossed approximately $400 million worldwide.

In the second half of the 1990s, Sorkin worked as a script doctor. He wrote some quips for Sean Connery and Nicolas Cage in 1996's The Rock. He worked on Excess Baggage, a 1997 comedy about a girl who stages her own kidnapping to get her father's attention, and rewrote some of Will Smith's scenes in Enemy of the State. Sorkin collaborated with Warren Beatty on several scripts, one of which was 1998's Bulworth. Beatty, known for occasionally personally financing his film projects through pre-production, also hired Sorkin to rewrite a script titled Ocean of Storms which never went into production. At one point, Sorkin sued Beatty for proper compensation for his work on the Ocean of Storms script; once the matter was settled, he resumed working on the script.

=== 1998–2006: Television series and theatre work ===
==== Sports Night ====
Sorkin conceived an idea to write about the behind-the-scenes happenings on a sports show while residing at the Four Seasons Hotel in Los Angeles writing the screenplay for The American President. He would work late, with the television tuned into ESPN, watching continuous replays of SportsCenter. The show inspired him to try to write a feature film about a sports show but he was unable to structure the story for film, so instead he turned his idea into a television series. Sports Night was produced by Disney and debuted on the ABC network in the fall of 1998.

Sorkin fought with ABC during the first season over the use of a laugh track and a live studio audience. The laugh track was widely decried by critics as jarring, with Joyce Millman of Salon magazine describing it as "the most unconvincing laugh track you've ever heard". Sorkin commented that "once you do shoot in front of a live audience, you have no choice but to use the laugh track. Oftentimes [enhancing the laughs] is the right thing to do. Sometimes you do need a cymbal crash. Other times, it alienates me." The laugh track was gradually dialed down and was removed by the end of the first season. Sorkin was successful in the second season when ABC agreed to his demands, unburdening the crew of the difficulties of staging a scene for a live audience and leaving the cast with more time to rehearse. Although Sports Night was critically acclaimed, ABC canceled the show after two seasons due to low ratings. Sorkin entertained offers to continue the show on other channels, but declined because they were dependent on his involvement and he was already working on The West Wing.

==== The West Wing ====
Stockard Channing had done an episode of the show as the First Lady. She took me out to lunch and said she really liked doing the show and wanted to do more and started asking me questions like, "Who do you think this character is?" And those aren't questions I can answer. [As a writer] I can only answer, what do they want?

— Sorkin on creating characters

Sorkin conceived the political drama The West Wing in 1997 when he went unprepared to a lunch with producer John Wells. In a panic he pitched to Wells a series centered on the senior staff of the White House, using leftover ideas from his script for The American President. He told Wells about his visits to the White House while doing research for The American President, and they found themselves discussing public service and the passion of the people who serve. Wells took the concept and pitched it to NBC, but was told to wait due to the Clinton–Lewinsky scandal. There was a concern that television audiences would not be able to take a series about the White House seriously. A year later, other networks started showing interest in The West Wing. NBC decided to give the project the green-light despite their previous reluctance. The pilot debuted in the fall of 1999 and was produced by Warner Bros. Television.

The West Wing garnered nine Primetime Emmy Awards for its debut season, making the series a record holder for most Emmys won by a series in a single season at the time. Following the awards ceremony, there was a dispute about the acceptance speech for Outstanding Writing for a Drama Series. The West Wing episode "In Excelsis Deo" won, which was awarded to Sorkin and Rick Cleveland, but The New York Times reported that Sorkin ushered Cleveland off the stage before he could say even a few words. The story behind "In Excelsis Deo" is based on Cleveland's father, a Korean War veteran who spent the last years of his life on the street, as Cleveland explained in an essay titled "I Was the Dumb Looking Guy with the Wire-Rimmed Glasses". Sorkin and Cleveland continued their dispute in a public web forum at Television Without Pity in which Sorkin explained that he gives his writers "Story By" credit on a rotating basis "by way of a gratuity" and that he had thrown out Cleveland's script and started from scratch. Sorkin would eventually apologize to Cleveland. Cleveland and Sorkin also won the Writers Guild of America Award for Television: Episodic Drama at the 53rd Writer Guild of America Awards for "In Excelsis Deo".

In 2001, after completing the second season of The West Wing, Sorkin had a drug relapse, and was arrested at Hollywood Burbank Airport for possession of hallucinogenic mushrooms, marijuana, and crack cocaine. He was ordered by a court to attend a drug diversion program. There was huge media interest but he made a successful recovery. In 2002, Sorkin criticized NBC News anchor Tom Brokaw's television special about a day in the life of a president, "The Bush White House: Inside the Real West Wing", comparing it to the act of sending a valentine to President George W. Bush instead of real news reporting. The West Wing aired on the same network, and so at the request of NBC's Entertainment President Jeff Zucker, Sorkin apologized, but later said, "there should be a difference between what NBC News does and what The West Wing TV series does."

Sorkin wrote 87 screenplays for The West Wing, nearly every episode during the show's first four seasons. Sorkin described his role in the creative process as "not so much [that of] a showrunner or a producer. I'm really a writer." He admitted that this approach can have its drawbacks, saying that "out of 88 [West Wing] episodes that I did, we were on time and on budget never, not once." In 2003, at the end of the fourth season, Sorkin and fellow executive producer Thomas Schlamme left the show due to internal conflicts at Warner Bros. Television, leading to John Wells to serve as showrunner. Sorkin never watched any episodes beyond his writing tenure apart from "a minute" of the fifth season's first episode, describing the experience as "like watching somebody make out with my girlfriend." Sorkin later returned in the series finale for a cameo appearance as a guest at the inauguration of Matthew Santos.

==== Studio 60 on the Sunset Strip ====
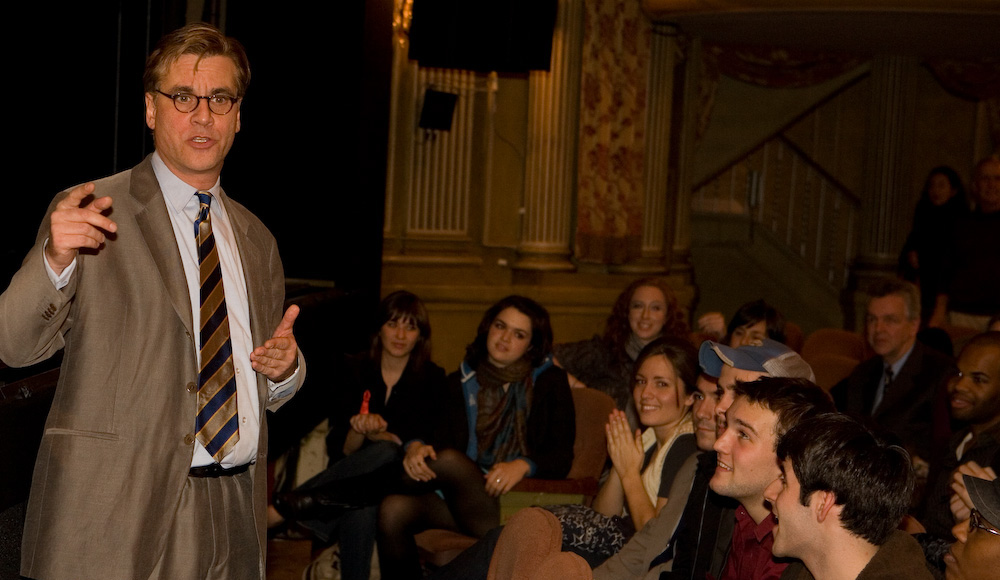
Sorkin discussing The Farnsworth Invention at the Music Box Theatre, November 2007

In 2005, Sorkin returned to theatre; he revised his play A Few Good Men for a production at London's West End. The play opened at the Theatre Royal Haymarket in the fall of the same year and was directed by David Esbjornson, with Rob Lowe in the lead role. Sorkin told The Charlie Rose Show that he was developing a television series based on a late-night sketch comedy show similar to Saturday Night Live. In October 2005, a pilot script dubbed Studio 7 on the Sunset Strip, written by himself with Schlamme as producer, started circulating in Hollywood and online. In that same month, NBC bought the rights from Warner Bros. Television to air the series on their network for a near-record license fee after a bidding war with CBS. The show's name was later changed to Studio 60 on the Sunset Strip. Sorkin described the show as having autobiographical elements to it and characters that are based on actual people, but said that it "departs from those beginnings to look at the backstage maneuverings at a late night sketch comedy show".

On September 18, 2006, the pilot for Studio 60 aired on NBC, directed by Schlamme. The pilot was critically acclaimed and viewed by an audience of over 12 million, but the show experienced a significant drop in viewership mid-season. Even before the first episode aired, there was a large amount of criticism in the press, as well as negative analysis from bloggers. In January 2007, Sorkin spoke out against the press for reporting heavily on the low ratings, and for using blogs and unemployed comedy writers as sources. After two months hiatus, Studio 60 resumed airing the last episodes of season one, which would be its only season.

==== The Farnsworth Invention ====
As early as 2003, Sorkin was writing a spec script about inventor Philo Farnsworth; he was approached by producer Fred Zollo in the 1990s about adapting Elma Farnsworth's memoir into a biographical film. The following year, he completed the film screenplay, The Farnsworth Invention, which was acquired by New Line Cinema with Schlamme as director. The story is about the patent battle between Farnsworth and RCA tycoon David Sarnoff for the technology that allowed the first television transmissions in the United States. No additional details were released about the film. Shortly, Sorkin was contacted by Jocelyn Clarke of the Abbey Theatre in Dublin, requesting he write a play for them, a commission which he accepted. Sorkin decided to rewrite The Farnsworth Invention as a play. He delivered a first draft of the play to the Abbey Theatre in early 2005, and a production was planned for 2007 with La Jolla Playhouse deciding to stage a workshop production of the play in collaboration with the Abbey Theatre. In 2006, Abbey Theatre's new management quit involvement with The Farnsworth Invention. Despite this, La Jolla Playhouse carried on with Steven Spielberg serving as a producer. The production opened under La Jolla's signature Page To Stage program which allowed Sorkin and director Des McAnuff to develop the play from show-to-show according to audience reactions and feedback; the play ran from February 20, 2007, through March 25, 2007. A Broadway production followed soon after, beginning in previews, and opening on November 14, 2007; however, the play was delayed by the 2007 Broadway stagehand strike. The Farnsworth Invention eventually opened at the Music Box Theatre on December 3, 2007, and closed on March 2, 2008.

=== 2007–2015: Return to film and The Newsroom ===
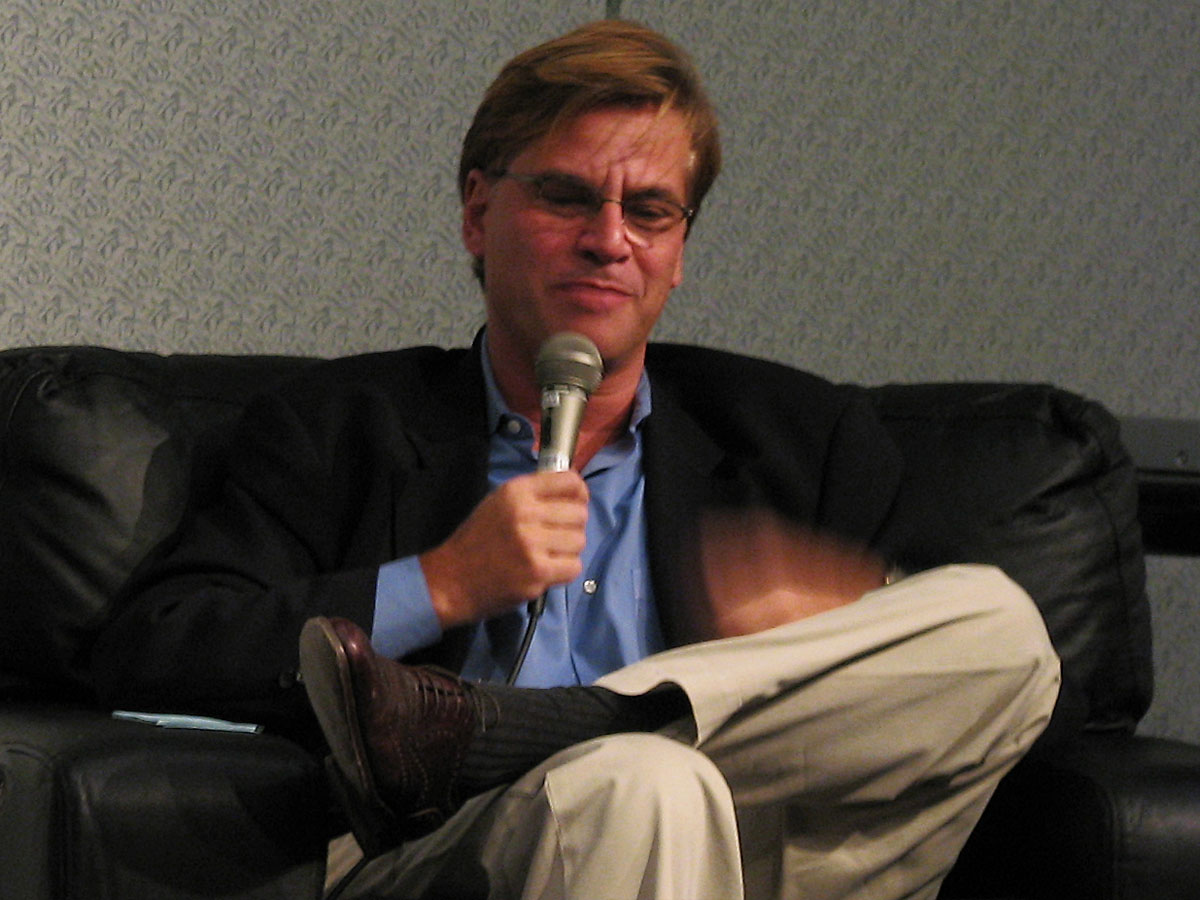
Sorkin interviewed William Goldman at the Screenwriting Expo, 2008

In 2004, Sorkin was commissioned by Universal Pictures to adapt George Crile's non-fiction book Charlie Wilson's War for Tom Hanks' production company Playtone. The biographical comedy, Charlie Wilson's War, is about the colorful Texas congressman Charlie Wilson who funded the CIA's secret war against the former Soviet Union in Afghanistan. Directed by Mike Nichols, and written by Sorkin, the film was released in 2007 and starred Tom Hanks, Julia Roberts and Philip Seymour Hoffman. The film earned five nominations at the Golden Globes, including Best Screenplay for Sorkin.

In August 2008, Sorkin announced that he had agreed to write a script for Sony Pictures and producer Scott Rudin about the beginnings of Facebook. David Fincher's The Social Network, based on Ben Mezrich's non fiction book The Accidental Billionaires, was released on October 1, 2010. It was a critical and commercial success; Sorkin won an Academy Award, BAFTA and a Golden Globe for the screenplay.

A year later, Sorkin received nominations in the same award categories for co-writing Moneyball. It is based on Michael Lewis's 2003 non-fiction book of the same name, an account of the Oakland Athletics baseball team's 2002 season and their general manager Billy Beane's attempts to assemble a competitive team. The film was directed by Bennett Miller, and starred Brad Pitt, Jonah Hill, and Philip Seymour Hoffman. Peter Travers of Rolling Stone called the script "dynamite", in which Sorkin's "sharply witty touch is everywhere".

In 2011, Sorkin played himself on the series 30 Rock, episode "Plan B", where he did a "walk and talk" with Liz Lemon played by Tina Fey. While still working on the screenplay for The Social Network, Sorkin was contemplating a television drama about the behind-the-scenes events at a cable news program. Talks had been ongoing between Sorkin and HBO since 2010. To research the news industry, Sorkin observed the production crew at MSNBC's Countdown with Keith Olbermann, and quizzed Parker Spitzer's staff. He also spent time shadowing Hardball with Chris Matthews, as well as other programs on Fox News and CNN. Sorkin told TV Guide that he intended to take a less cynical view of the media: "They're going to be trying to do well in a context where it's very difficult to do well when there are commercial concerns and political concerns and corporate concerns." Sorkin decided that rather than have his characters react to fictional news events as on his earlier series, it would be set in the recent past and track real-world stories largely as they unfolded, to give a greater sense of realism.

[T]he trick is to follow the rules of classic storytelling. Drama is basically about one thing: Somebody wants something, and something or someone is standing in the way of him getting it. What he wants—the money, the girl, the ticket to Philadelphia—doesn't really matter. But whatever it is, the audience has to want it for him.

— Sorkin

HBO ordered a pilot episode in January 2011 with the working title More as This Story Develops, with Scott Rudin serving as an executive producer. In September, HBO ordered a 10-episode series of The Newsroom with a premiere date of June 2012. A day after the second episode aired, HBO renewed the series for a second season. Sorkin said The Newsroom "is meant to be an idealistic, romantic, swashbuckling, sometimes comedic but very optimistic, upward-looking look at a group of people who are often looked at cynically. The same as with The West Wing, where ordinarily in popular culture our leaders are portrayed either as Machiavellian or dumb; I wanted to do something different and show a highly competent group of people." The series concluded after its third season.

In 2015, Danny Boyle's biographical drama Steve Jobs was released. The screenplay by Sorkin was based on Walter Isaacson's biography of Steve Jobs, and starred Michael Fassbender as Jobs, Kate Winslet as Joanna Hoffman, Jeff Daniels as John Sculley, and Seth Rogen as Steve Wozniak. Sorkin expressed hesitation for tackling the film, saying "it was a little like writing about the Beatles—that there are so many people out there who know so much about him [Jobs] and who revere him that I just saw a minefield of disappointment. [...] Hopefully, when I'm done with my research, I'll be in the same ball park of knowledge about Steve Jobs". He won a Golden Globe Award for Best Screenplay, although some journalists were surprised that he did not receive an Academy Award nomination in the same category.

=== 2016–present: Film directing debut and Broadway work ===
==== To Kill a Mockingbird and Camelot ====
In February 2016, it was announced that Sorkin would adapt Harper Lee's To Kill a Mockingbird for the stage, reuniting with Jeff Daniels, who would portray Atticus Finch. This would be Sorkin's first collaboration with director Bartlett Sher. His Broadway adaptation opened on December 13, 2018, to positive reviews at the Shubert Theatre.

It was announced that Sorkin would be reuniting with Sher to write a revised book for the Broadway revival of the Lerner and Loewe musical Camelot starring Phillipa Soo and Andrew Burnap. The production was set to begin at Lincoln Center's Vivian Beaumont Theater on November 3, 2022, but was moved back to April 13, 2023.

==== Work as film director ====
Sorkin made his directorial debut with Molly's Game, an adaptation of entrepreneur Molly Bloom's memoir. He also wrote the script for the film, which starred Jessica Chastain and Idris Elba. Production began in 2016 and the film was released in December 2017 to mostly positive reviews; Sorkin received his third Academy Award nomination for Best Adapted Screenplay. On review aggregator Rotten Tomatoes, Molly's Game garnered an approval rating of 81% based on 297 reviews, with an average rating of 7.07/10.

Sorkin told Vanity Fair in July 2020 that Steven Spielberg offered him a job in 2006 about "a movie about the riots at the 1968 Chicago Democratic Convention and the trial that followed". However, after meeting at Spielberg's home, Sorkin said, "I left not knowing what the hell he was talking about." On July 12, 2007, Variety magazine reported that Sorkin had signed a deal with DreamWorks to write three scripts. The first was The Trial of the Chicago 7, which Sorkin was already developing with Spielberg, Walter Parkes and Laurie MacDonald. In March 2010, Sorkin's agent, Ari Emanuel, had stated that the project was proving "tough to get together". In late July 2013, it was announced that Paul Greengrass would be directing, but Sorkin eventually both wrote and directed the film. Focusing on the Chicago Seven (and Bobby Seale), the film began a limited release on September 25, 2020, before streaming on Netflix. At the 78th Golden Globes, Sorkin won Best Screenplay, and was nominated for Best Director.

In September 2015, Entertainment Weekly reported that Sorkin was writing a biopic that would focus on the twenty-year marriage of Lucille Ball and Desi Arnaz, and their work on a comedy series, I Love Lucy. Cate Blanchett was originally to star as Ball. In 2017, Amazon Studios acquired the rights to the film. In January 2021, it was announced that Blanchett had been replaced by Nicole Kidman, and Javier Bardem had been cast as Desi Arnaz. Titled Being the Ricardos (2021), it was directed by Sorkin and received a limited theatrical release on December 10, 2021, before streaming on Prime Video on December 21. Paul Byrnes of The Sydney Morning Herald praised the film's dialogue, while the critic from The Irish Times opined that the film lacked "spark or insight".

In November 2024, it was reported Sorkin was working on a project that would be a continuation of the themes that were the focus of The Social Network, as he had previously hinted at in a 2024 podcast conversation. In June 2025, Deadline reported that he would be writing and directing a follow-up to The Social Network based on the documents known as the Facebook Files, officially announced as The Social Reckoning in September 2025.

== Prospective projects ==
In March 2007, it was reported that Sorkin had signed on to write a musical adaptation of the hit 2002 record Yoshimi Battles the Pink Robots by psychedelic-rock band The Flaming Lips, collaborating with director Des McAnuff who had been developing the project. In August 2008, McAnuff announced that Sorkin had been commissioned by the Stratford Shakespeare Festival to write an adaptation of Chekhov's The Cherry Orchard. In 2010, Sorkin reportedly obtained the film rights to Andrew Young's book The Politician (about Senator John Edwards), and announced that he would make his debut as a film director while adapting the book for the screen.

In November 2010, it was reported that Sorkin would write a musical based on the life of Houdini, with music by Danny Elfman. In January 2012, Stephen Schwartz was reported to be writing the music and lyrics, with Sorkin making his debut as a librettist. The musical was expected for release in 2013–14; Sorkin said: "The chance to collaborate with Stephen Schwartz [the director], Jack O'Brien, and Hugh Jackman on a new Broadway musical is a huge gift." In January 2013, he quit the project, citing film and television commitments.

In March 2016, it was announced that Sorkin would adapt A Few Good Men for a live production on NBC, originally slated to air in 2017; as of November 2017, "Sorkin is still mulling the project".

In November 2024, Deadline reported that Warner Bros. had made a deal for Sorkin to write and possibly direct a film about the founder of the Israeli air force, Al Schwimmer.

== Writing process and style ==
You almost never see how anyone travels from point A to point C [in most TV shows]. I wanted the audience to witness every journey these people took. It all had a purpose, even seeing them order lunch. It just seemed to be the proper visual rhythm with which to marry Aaron's words. I got lucky that it worked.

— Thomas Schlamme on the "walk and talk" device

Sorkin has written for the theater, film, and television, and in each medium his level of collaboration with other creators has varied. He began in theater, which involved a largely solitary writing process, then moved into film, where he collaborated with director Rob Reiner and screenwriter William Goldman, and eventually worked in television, where he collaborated very closely with director Thomas Schlamme for nearly a decade on the shows Sports Night, The West Wing and Studio 60 on the Sunset Strip; he now moves between all three media. He had a habit of chain smoking while he spent long hours plotting out scripts in his office, though he quit smoking after having a stroke in 2022. He describes his writing process as physical because he will often stand up and speak the dialogue he is developing.

A New York Times article by Peter de Jonge explained that "The West Wing is never plotted out for more than a few weeks ahead and has no major story lines", which De Jonge believed was because "with characters who have no flaws, it is impossible to give them significant arcs". Sorkin has stated: "I seldom plan ahead, not because I don't think it's good to plan ahead, there just isn't time." Sorkin has also said, "As a writer, I don't like to answer questions until the very moment that I have to." The Seattle Post-Intelligencer's TV critic John Levesque has commented that Sorkin's writing process "can make for ill-advised plot developments". Further complicating the matter, in television, Sorkin will have a hand in writing every episode, rarely letting other writers earn full credit on a script. De Jonge reported that ex-writers of The West Wing have claimed that "even by the spotlight-hogging standards of Hollywood, Sorkin has been exceptionally ungenerous in his sharing of writing credit". In a comment to GQ magazine in 2008, Sorkin said, "I'm helped by a staff of people who have great ideas, but the scripts aren't written by committee."

Sorkin's long-term collaboration with Schlamme began in early 1998 when they found they shared common creative ground on the soon to be produced Sports Night. Their successful partnership in television is one in which Sorkin focuses on writing the scripts while Schlamme executive produces and occasionally directs; they have worked together on Sports Night, The West Wing, and Studio 60 on the Sunset Strip. Schlamme will create the look of the shows, work with the other directors, discuss the scripts with Sorkin as soon as they are turned in, make design and casting decisions, and attend the budget meetings; Sorkin tends to stick strictly to writing. In response to what he perceived as unfair criticism of The Newsroom, Jacob Drum of Digital Americana wrote, "The essential truth that the critics miss is that The Newsroom is Sorkin being Sorkin as he always has been and always will be: one part pioneer; one part self-conscious romantic; two parts actual Lewis & Clark-style pioneer, trapping his way across an old, old idea of an America that can always stand to raise its game—but most importantly, spinning a good yarn while he does so."

For me, the writing experience is very much like a date. It's not unusual that I'm really funny here and really smart here and maybe showing some anger over here so she sees maybe I have this dark side. I want it to have been worth it for everyone to sit through it for however long I ask them to.

— Sorkin on his writing as characterized by mentor William Goldman

As a writer, Sorkin is recognized for his trademark fast-paced dialogue and extended monologues, complemented by frequent collaborator Thomas Schlamme's storytelling technique called the "walk and talk". These sequences consist of single tracking shots of long duration involving multiple characters engaging in conversation as they move through the set; characters enter and exit the conversation as the shot continues without any cuts. Sorkin is also known for writing memorable lines, such as "You can't handle the truth!" from A Few Good Men and the partly Latin tirade against God: "You get Hoynes!" in The West Wing episode "Two Cathedrals". For television, one hallmark of Sorkin's writer's voice is the repartee that his characters engage in as they small talk and banter about whimsical events taking place within an episode, and interject obscure popular culture references into conversation. Although his scripts are lauded for being literate, Sorkin has been criticized for often turning in scripts that are overwrought. His mentor William Goldman has commented that normally in visual media speeches are avoided, but that Sorkin has a talent for dialogue and gets away with breaking this rule. His portrayal of women has been criticized by several commentators, with female characters in his works often subordinate, written to support the main male characters, ditzy and incompetent or ostensibly professional while still being depicted as overly emotional and needing to be rescued by men.

In 2012 and 2013, a fan created a YouTube video compilation showing how Sorkin tended to reuse certain lines of dialogue. The creator said the project was not a critique but was intended as a "playful excursion through Sorkin's wonderful world of words" with Sorkin also getting in touch with him personally.

== Personal life ==
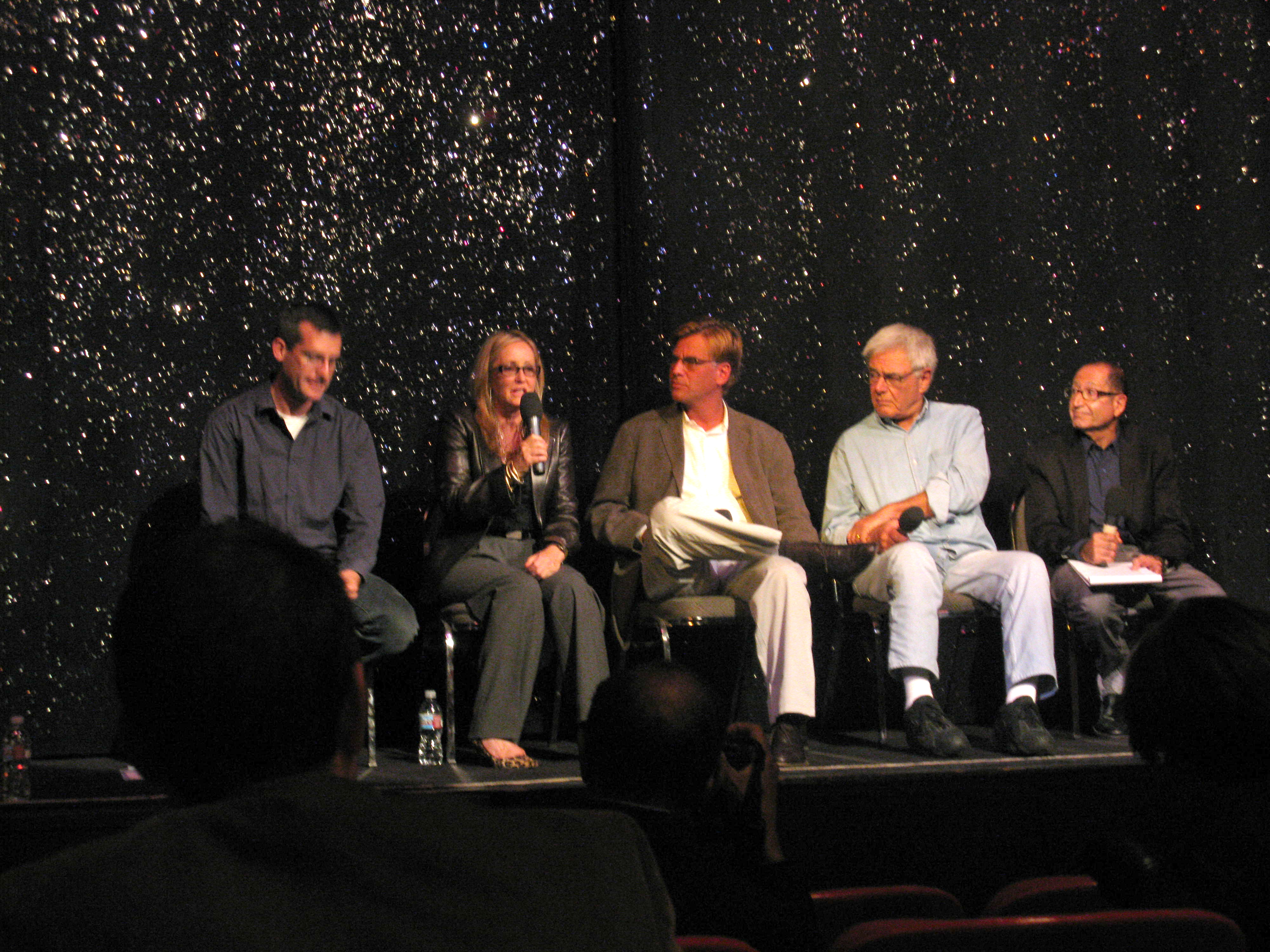
Sorkin at a Generation Obama event, following a screening of Mr. Smith Goes to Washington, 2008.

Sorkin married Julia Bingham in 1996 and divorced in 2005, with his workaholic habits and drug abuse reported to be a partial cause. Sorkin and Bingham have one daughter, Roxanne Sophie, born in November 2000, known as Roxy, who works as a filmmaker and an actress. A previous pregnancy four years earlier ended in the stillbirth of a baby boy they named Charlie. Sorkin dated Kristin Chenoweth, who played Annabeth Schott on The West Wing, for several years (after Sorkin had left the show). He also reportedly dated columnist Maureen Dowd and actress Kristin Davis. In 2021, Sorkin and Paulina Porizkova dated for a few months.

A consistent supporter of the Democratic Party, Sorkin made political campaign contributions to several candidates between 1999 and 2011. During the 2004 US presidential election campaign, the liberal advocacy group MoveOn's political action committee enlisted Sorkin and Rob Reiner to create one of their anti-Bush campaign advertisements. In August 2008, Sorkin was involved in a Generation Obama event at the Fine Arts Theater in Beverly Hills, California, participating in a panel discussion after a screening of Frank Capra's Mr. Smith Goes to Washington. However, Sorkin does not consider himself a political activist: "I've met political activists, and they're for real. I've never marched anyplace or done anything that takes more effort than writing a check, in terms of activism". In 2016, after President Donald Trump won the election, Sorkin wrote an open letter to his daughter Roxy and her mother Julia.

In 1987, Sorkin had started using marijuana and cocaine. He said cocaine gave him relief from certain nervous tensions that occurred on a regular basis. In 1995, on the advice of Bingham, he sought rehabilitation at the Hazelden Institute in Minnesota to combat his addiction. In early 2001, Sorkin and his colleagues John Spencer and Martin Sheen received the Phoenix Rising Award for overcoming their drug abuse. However, on April 15, 2001, Sorkin was arrested when security guards at Hollywood Burbank Airport found that he was in possession of hallucinogenic mushrooms, marijuana, crack cocaine, and a metal crack pipe. He was court-ordered to a drug diversion program, while still working on The West Wing. In a commencement speech for Syracuse University on May 13, 2012, Sorkin said he has not used cocaine for eleven years.

He was a contributor to The Huffington Post in 2011 and 2012.

In 2012, Sorkin said he enjoyed watching The Office, Parks and Recreation, The Good Wife, Homeland and Modern Family. In 2011, The Good Wife had featured a storyline about a technology executive suing a screenwriter that appeared to be inspired by Sorkin's role as a screenwriter of The Social Network.

In November 2022, Sorkin had a stroke which was caused by hypertension. He later called it "a loud wake-up call" to improve his health, and said he quit smoking, changed his diet, and began exercising daily as a result.

In August 2014, he signed an open letter from members of the Hollywood community condemning Hamas rocket attacks on Israel during the 2014 Gaza War. In October 2023, he was one of many Hollywood signatories of a letter calling on President Biden to work toward the release of all Israeli hostages after the October 7 attacks. In the same month, Sorkin also dropped CAA over a post critical of Israel made by its co-chief of the motion pictures department, Maha Dakhil, during the Gaza war.

In October 2025, he was a founding signatory of a revival of the Committee for the First Amendment.

== Works ==
=== Film ===
Year	Title	Director	Writer	Notes
1992	A Few Good Men	No	Yes	
1993	Malice	No	Yes	With Scott Frank and Jonas McCord
1995	The American President	No	Yes	
2007	Charlie Wilson's War	No	Yes	
2010	The Social Network	No	Yes	
2011	Moneyball	No	Yes	With Steven Zaillian
2015	Steve Jobs	No	Yes	
2017	Molly's Game	Yes	Yes	
2020	The Trial of the Chicago 7	Yes	Yes	
2021	Being the Ricardos	Yes	Yes	
2026	The Social Reckoning	Yes	Yes	Also producer

Acting roles

Year	Title	Role
1992	A Few Good Men	Man in bar
1995	The American President	Aide in bar
2010	The Social Network	Ad executive
2017	Molly's Game	Man in bar

=== Television ===
Year	Title	Writer	Executive producer	Creator
1998–2000	Sports Night	Yes	Yes	Yes
1999–2006	The West Wing	Yes	Yes	Yes
2006–07	Studio 60 on the Sunset Strip	Yes	Yes	Yes
2012–14	The Newsroom	Yes	Yes	Yes
2020	A West Wing Special to Benefit When We All Vote	Yes	Yes	Yes

Acting roles

Year	Title	Role	Notes	Ref.
1999	Sports Night	Man at bar	Episode: "Small Town"	
2006	The West Wing	Man in crowd	Episode: "Tomorrow"	
2009	Entourage	Himself	Episode: "The Sorkin Notes"	
2011	30 Rock	Himself	Episode: "Plan B"	
2025	The Studio	Himself	Episode: "The Golden Globes"	

=== Theater ===
Playwright

Year	Title	Venue	Ref.
1984	Removing All Doubt	Syracuse University	
1988	Hidden in This Picture	West Bank Cafe Downstairs Theatre Bar	
1989	A Few Good Men	Music Box Theatre, Broadway (1989); Vivian Beaumont Theatre, Broadway (2026)	
1990	Making Movies	Promenade Theatre	
2007	The Farnsworth Invention	La Jolla Playhouse, San Diego; Music Box Theatre, Broadway	
2018	To Kill a Mockingbird	Shubert Theatre, Broadway (2018); Gielgud Theatre, London (2022)	
2023	Camelot	Vivian Beaumont Theater, Broadway	

== Awards and nominations ==
Sorkin has been recognized by the Academy of Motion Picture Arts and Sciences for the following films:

- 83rd Academy Awards: Best Adapted Screenplay, win, The Social Network (2010)
- 84th Academy Awards: Best Adapted Screenplay, nomination, Moneyball (2011)
- 90th Academy Awards: Best Adapted Screenplay, nomination, Molly's Game (2017)
- 93rd Academy Awards: Best Original Screenplay, nomination, The Trial of the Chicago 7 (2020)

Sorkin has been nominated for ten Golden Globe Awards, winning three for Best Screenplay for: The Social Network (2011), Steve Jobs (2015), and The Trial of the Chicago Seven (2020). He has also received five British Academy Film Awards nominations, winning one for The Social Network (2010). He has also received fourteen Writers Guild of America Award nominations winning twice for The West Wing, and The Social Network (2010). He has received seven Critics' Choice Movie Awards nominations winning consecutively for Best Screenplay for The Social Network and Moneyball.

For his work on television Sorkin has received nine Primetime Emmy Award nominations winning four awards for Outstanding Drama Series for The West Wing in 2000, 2001, 2002, and 2003. He also won the Primetime Emmy Award for Outstanding Writing for a Drama Series for The West Wing episode "In Excelsis Deo" in 2000.

== See also ==
- List of playwrights from the United States
- List of Jewish Academy Award winners and nominees
- List of Primetime Emmy Award winners
- List of Golden Globe winners
