= List of awards and nominations received by Aaron Sorkin =

Aaron Sorkin awards and nominations
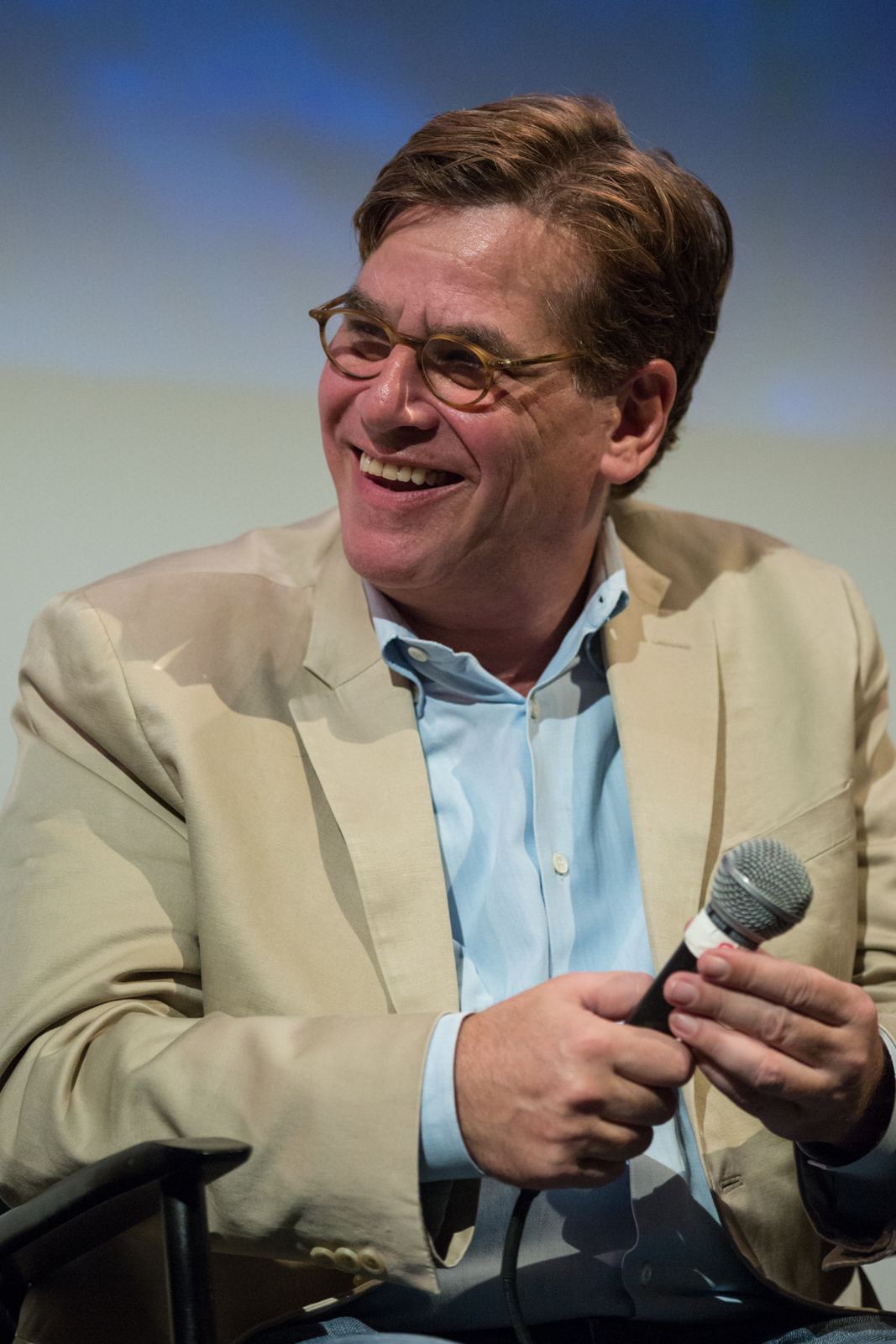
- Sorkin in 2016
Awards and nominations
Award	Wins	Nominations
Academy Awards	1	4
BAFTA Awards	1	6
Emmy Awards	5	11
Golden Globes	3	9
WGA Awards	2	14

Totals (Note: Certain award groups do not simply award one winner. They acknowledge several different recipients, have runners-up, and have third place. Since this is a specific recognition and is different from losing an award, runner-up mentions are considered wins in this award tally. For simplification and to avoid errors, each award in this list has been presumed to have had a prior nomination.)
- Wins: 12
- Nominations: 44

Aaron Sorkin is an American screenwriter, playwright, and filmmaker known for his work in film, television and theatre. Over his career he has received several awards including an Academy Award, a BAFTA Award, five Primetime Emmy Awards, three Golden Globe Awards, and two Writers Guild of America Awards, as well as a nomination for a Laurence Olivier Award and two Directors Guild of America Awards.

Sorkin gained stardom and acclaim for creating and writing the ABC drama series Sports Night (1998–2000), the NBC political drama series The West Wing (1999–2006), the NBC comedy-drama series Studio 60 on the Sunset Strip (2006–2007), and the HBO political comedy-drama series The Newsroom (2013–2015). For The West Wing, Sorkin received four Primetime Emmy Awards for Outstanding Drama Series in 2000, 2001, 2002, and 2003 and the Primetime Emmy Award for Outstanding Writing for a Drama Series for "In Excelsis Deo" in 2000.

On film, Sorkin won the Academy Award for Best Adapted Screenplay for the David Fincher drama The Social Network (2010). He was Oscar-nominated for the sports drama Moneyball (2011), the thriller Molly's Game (2017), and the political drama The Trial of the Chicago 7 (2020). He is also known for writing the screenplays for the legal drama A Few Good Men (1992), the romantic comedy The American President (1995), the political drama Charlie Wilson's War (2007), and the biographical dramas Steve Jobs (2015), and Being the Ricardos (2021).

Sorkin made his Broadway debut in 1989 with A Few Good Men. He followed it up with his original play The Farnsworth Invention (2007) and with the stage adaptation of Harper Lee's To Kill a Mockingbird in 2018 starring Jeff Daniels as Atticus Finch. The latter play ran for a year with Daniels in the lead role and received nine Tony Award nominations. The play transferred to the West End where it was nominated for the Laurence Olivier Award for Best New Play. He adapted the Broadway musical revival of the Lerner and Loewe musical Camelot (2022).

== Major associations ==
=== Academy Awards ===
Year	Category	Nominated work	Result	Ref.
2010	Best Adapted Screenplay	The Social Network	Won	
2011	Best Adapted Screenplay	Moneyball	Nominated	
2017	Best Adapted Screenplay	Molly's Game	Nominated	
2020	Best Original Screenplay	The Trial of the Chicago 7	Nominated	

=== BAFTA Awards ===
Year	Category	Nominated work	Result	Ref.
British Academy Film Awards
2010	Best Adapted Screenplay	The Social Network	Won	
2011	Best Adapted Screenplay	Moneyball	Nominated	
2015	Best Adapted Screenplay	Steve Jobs	Nominated	
2017	Best Adapted Screenplay	Molly's Game	Nominated	
2020	Best Original Screenplay	The Trial of the Chicago 7	Nominated	
2021	Best Original Screenplay	Being the Ricardos	Nominated	

=== Critics' Choice Movie Awards ===
Year	Category	Nominated work	Result	Ref.
2008	Best Writer	Charlie Wilson's War	Nominated	
2011	Best Adapted Screenplay	The Social Network	Won	
2012	Best Adapted Screenplay	Moneyball	Won	
2016	Best Adapted Screenplay	Steve Jobs	Nominated	
2018	Best Adapted Screenplay	Molly's Game	Nominated	
2021	Best Director	The Trial of the Chicago 7	Nominated	
2021	Best Original Screenplay	The Trial of the Chicago 7	Nominated	
2022	Best Original Screenplay	Being the Ricardos	Nominated	

=== Emmy Awards ===
Year	Category	Nominated work	Result	Ref.
Primetime Emmy Awards
1999	Outstanding Writing for a Comedy Series	Sports Night (episode: "The Apology")	Nominated	
2000	Outstanding Drama Series	The West Wing (season one)	Won	
2000	Outstanding Writing for a Drama Series	The West Wing (episode: "Pilot")	Nominated	
2000	Outstanding Writing for a Drama Series	The West Wing (episode: "In Excelsis Deo")	Won	
2001	Outstanding Drama Series	The West Wing (season two)	Won	
2001	Outstanding Writing for a Drama Series	The West Wing (episode: "In the Shadow of Two Gunmen")	Nominated	
2002	Outstanding Drama Series	The West Wing (season three)	Won	
2002	Outstanding Writing for a Drama Series	The West Wing (episode: "Posse Comitatus")	Nominated	
2003	Outstanding Drama Series	The West Wing (season four)	Won	
2003	Outstanding Writing for a Drama Series	The West Wing (episode: "Twenty Five")	Nominated	
2021	Outstanding Variety Special (Pre-Recorded)	A West Wing Special to Benefit When We All Vote	Nominated	

=== Golden Globe Awards ===
Year	Category	Nominated work	Result	Ref.
1992	Best Screenplay – Motion Picture	A Few Good Men	Nominated	
1995	Best Screenplay – Motion Picture	The American President	Nominated	
2007	Best Screenplay – Motion Picture	Charlie Wilson's War	Nominated	
2010	Best Screenplay – Motion Picture	The Social Network	Won	
2011	Best Screenplay – Motion Picture	Moneyball	Nominated	
2015	Best Screenplay – Motion Picture	Steve Jobs	Won	
2017	Best Screenplay – Motion Picture	Molly's Game	Nominated	
2020	Best Screenplay – Motion Picture	The Trial of the Chicago 7	Won	
2021	Best Screenplay – Motion Picture	Being the Ricardos	Nominated	

=== Laurence Olivier Award ===
Year	Category	Nominated work	Result	Ref.
2023	Best New Play	To Kill a Mockingbird	Nominated	

== Guild awards ==
=== Directors Guild of America Award ===
Year	Category	Nominated work	Result	Ref.
2018	Outstanding Achievement in First-Time Feature Film	Molly's Game	Nominated	
2021	Outstanding Directional Achievement in Feature Film	The Trial of the Chicago Seven	Nominated	

=== Writers Guild of America Awards ===
Year	Category	Nominated work	Result	Ref.
1995	Best Original Screenplay	The American President	Nominated	
2000	Episodic Drama ("In Excelsis Deo")	The West Wing	Won	
2000	Episodic Drama ("Take This Sabbath Day")	The West Wing	Nominated	
2001	Episodic Drama ("Two Cathedrals" & "Somebody's Going to Emergency, Somebody's Going to Jail")	The West Wing	Nominated	
2002	Episodic Drama ("Game On")	The West Wing	Nominated	
2005	Dramatic Series	The West Wing	Nominated	
2006	New Series	Studio 60 on the Sunset Strip	Nominated	
2006	Episodic Drama ("Pilot")	Studio 60 on the Sunset Strip	Nominated	
2010	Best Adapted Screenplay	The Social Network	Won	
2011	Best Adapted Screenplay	Moneyball	Nominated	
2012	New Series	The Newsroom	Nominated	
2015	Best Adapted Screenplay	Steve Jobs	Nominated	
2017	Best Adapted Screenplay	Molly's Game	Nominated	
2020	Best Original Screenplay	The Trial of the Chicago 7	Nominated	
2021	Best Original Screenplay	Being the Ricardos	Nominated	

== Accolades earned for Sorkin's directed films ==
Year	Film	Academy Awards		BAFTAs		Golden Globes	
Year	Film	Nominations	Wins	Nominations	Wins	Nominations	Wins
2017	Molly's Game	1		1		2	
2020	The Trial of the Chicago 7	6		3		5	1
2021	Being the Ricardos	3		2		3	1
Total		10		6		10	2

Directed Academy Award performances
Under Sorkin's direction, these actors have received Academy Award nominations for their performances in their respective roles.

Year	Performer	Film	Result
Academy Award for Best Actor
2021	Javier Bardem	Being the Ricardos	Nominated
Academy Award for Best Actress
2021	Nicole Kidman	Being the Ricardos	Nominated
Academy Award for Best Supporting Actor
2020	Sacha Baron Cohen	The Trial of the Chicago 7	Nominated
2021	J. K. Simmons	Being the Ricardos	Nominated
