= Louis Carreon =

American artist

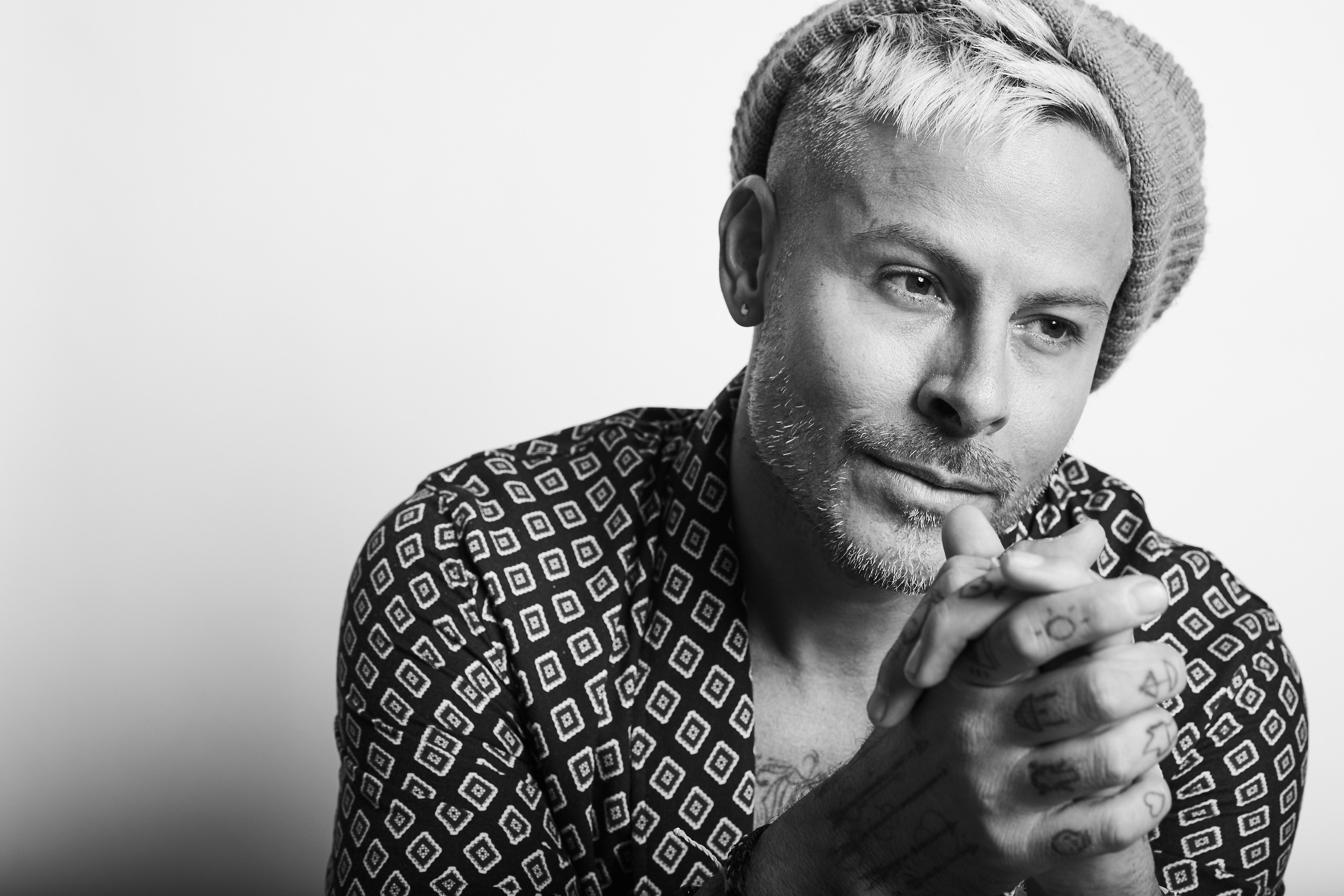
Artist Louis Carreon

Louis Carreon is a contemporary artist with a background in street art. He frequently exhibits in galleries around the world. One of his best known commissions was a custom mural on a 12-seater private jet for Art Basel Miami, featuring his "International Symbols of Travel." Currently, he is based in Los Angeles and works from his Hollywood studio called The Drip Factory.

== Early life ==
Louis Carreon grew up in California, and was heavily involved in the region's skateboarding, surfing, rapping and graffiti art sub-cultures. He dropped out of school when he was 16 and started traveling. By the time he was 17, he had done graffiti art and building tagging in every large city in the US.

== Influences ==
Though his style is distinctive, he openly invites comparisons of his work to Jean-Michel Basquiat and Keith Haring. In 2015, he dedicated his mural for Landmark Aviation to the Keith Haring Foundation and awareness of AIDS.

== Personal life ==
Carreon credits surfing as a hobby that greatly inspires him, having competed nationally by the age of 16 and frequently travels to surfing destinations around the world.

Carreon's current success as a contemporary artist comes after spending two years in prison for drug-related charges. During this time he came to find peace and solace in the process of creating art, and even credits art as something that helps keep his addiction issues under control.

While incarcerated, he also learned a lot about his craft as an artist. He told BASIC Magazine, "In prison, you don’t get to use paints, so there’s a lot of pen time. I was drawing in sketchbooks every day, learning different penmanship and fonts and reading about art. The whole time I was in prison, I was sketching, but on a different scale. I was plotting my road map as I watched artists gain a little bit of gravity at that time."

== Exhibitions ==
Carreon frequently exhibits at Hamilton Selway Gallery in West Hollywood. Their inventory includes his greatest influences, Jean-Michel Basquiat and Keith Haring. Carreon is one of the few living artists that the gallery represents.

His exhibitions with the gallery have included "No Unsolicited Submissions" and "Church + State," which examines our near-worship of Google as an authority above both government and faith.

== Commercial work ==
Carron has been commissioned by, among others, the SoHo House, The Verb Hotel and The Viper Room.

He was hired to custom paint the Stanley Cup for the Chicago Blackhawks, to raise money for Autism Speaks. In 2015 he was commissioned by Landmark Aviation to paint a 12 seater private jet with a mural of his International Symbols of Travel. These were also featured in his commission for Denison Yachting, where he painted a mural on the transom of a yacht named Troca One.
