= The Politician (disambiguation) =

The Politician is a play published in 1655.

A politician is a person who participates in politics.

The Politician(s) or Politician(s) may also refer to:

- The Politician (1963 book), a 1963 book by Robert Welch, founder of the John Birch Society
- The Politician (book), a 2010 book about the US presidential candidate John Edwards
- The Politician (TV series), a Netflix series created by Ryan Murphy
- "Politician", a song by Cream from their 1968 album Wheels of Fire
- SS Politician, a ship whose sinking inspired Whisky Galore!
- Chicago Politicians, an American football team
- The Politicians, a New Zealand rock/new wave/reggae band formed in 1981
