= Molly Bloom (author) =

American entrepreneur and author

- Born: 1977 or 1978 (age 47–48); Loveland, Colorado, U.S.
- Education: University of Colorado Boulder
- Occupations: Entrepreneur, speaker, author
- Notable work: Molly's Game
- Relatives: Jeremy Bloom (brother)

Molly Bloom (born 1977 or 1978) is an American entrepreneur and public speaker. During the 2000s, she became known as the "Poker Princess", for organizing high stakes underground poker in Los Angeles that attracted A-list actors. She was previously a competitive skier and a member of the U.S. Ski Team.

In April 2013, Bloom was charged with running an illegal poker game in New York. In May 2014, after pleading guilty, she was sentenced to one year of probation, a $200,000 fine, 200 hours of community service, and forfeiture of $125,000. Her 2014 memoir Molly's Game was adapted into a 2017 film starring Jessica Chastain and directed by Aaron Sorkin.

== Early life ==
Bloom is the daughter of a Jewish father and a non-Jewish mother. Her father, Larry Bloom, is a clinical psychologist and a professor at Colorado State University. Her brother is Jeremy Bloom, a former Olympic skier and professional football player. Molly grew up in Loveland, Colorado, and was a competitive skier and a member of the U.S. Ski Team who was at one time ranked third in women's moguls in the Nor-Am Cup season rankings. She attended the University of Colorado Boulder, where she studied political science.

== Career ==
In 2004, Bloom moved to Los Angeles and found work as a bartender. That year Darin Feinstein, one of the co-owners of The Viper Room nightclub, was approached by actor Tobey Maguire about hosting a high-stakes poker game in the club's basement. Feinstein recruited Bloom to cater to the players and manage the game. In 2007, Bloom started her own business, registering Molly Bloom Inc. as an event and catering company to host poker tournaments. By 2008, the games had graduated to private homes and hotels like the Peninsula Beverly Hills, with hands going as high as $4 million. In addition to Maguire, wealthy people, celebrities, and sports figures were known to frequent the games, including Leonardo DiCaprio, Alec Gores, Macaulay Culkin, Matt Damon, Ben Affleck, Alex Rodriguez, Nelly, Mary-Kate Olsen, Ashley Olsen, Phil Ivey, Rick Salomon, and Andy Beal. Bloom was dubbed the "Poker Princess" by the tabloids for her game-hosting reputation in Los Angeles. Around 2009, she moved to New York where she began organizing games.

In 2011, one of the games Bloom had been associated with in Los Angeles became part of a bankruptcy investigation into a Ponzi scheme run by Bradley Ruderman. After Ruderman's conviction, bankruptcy trustees discovered that he had been using the fraudulent hedge fund to pay gambling debts to Bloom and a number of players. The trustees sued those involved, seeking the return of at least $1.5 million. No criminal charges were pursued.

=== Illegal gambling conviction ===
On April 16, 2013, Bloom was arrested and charged along with 33 others as part of a $100 million money laundering and illegal sports gambling operation. Preet Bharara, the United States Attorney for the Southern District of New York, charged 12 people with racketeering. Others were charged with money laundering, extortion, fraud, and operating illegal poker rooms in New York City. Bloom faced a maximum penalty of 10 years in prison, six years of supervised release, a fine of $1.5 million or twice the amount gained from the crimes or twice the amount lost by victims, and a $200 special assessment.

In December 2013, Bloom pleaded guilty to charges of running illegal poker games. She was sentenced the next May to one year of probation, 200 hours of community service, and forfeiture of $125,000; U.S. District Judge Jesse M. Furman found that she had played a minor role in the larger gambling operation that did not warrant prison time. At the sentencing, Bloom's lawyer, Jim Walden, told the court that Bloom made about $1 million from tips and her cut of the poker pot, much of which was used to tip other employees, and was deeply in debt. He stated that Bloom had originally "been ordered into the gambling business" by her boss at a Los Angeles real estate company.

=== Post-gambling ventures ===
Bloom's memoir about her experiences, Molly's Game, was published in 2014. A film adaptation of the book, also called Molly's Game, written and directed by Aaron Sorkin, premiered at the Toronto Film Festival on September 8, 2017. Jessica Chastain plays the role of Molly Bloom. The film received a 2018 Academy Award nomination in the category of Best Adapted Screenplay.

Beginning in 2022, Bloom was an executive producer and the host of two seasons of Torched, a podcast series exploring controversial Olympic events and other sports stories. The show, produced by FilmNation, is described as a "mix of documentary-style storytelling and interviews with athletes."

== Personal life ==
Bloom had her first child, a daughter, on February 8, 2022. The baby was conceived through in vitro fertilisation (IVF); according to Bloom, "I did nine rounds of IVF."
