= Molly's Game =

2017 film by Aaron Sorkin

- Theatrical release poster
- Directed by: Aaron Sorkin
- Screenplay by: Aaron Sorkin
- Based on: Molly's Game by Molly Bloom
- Produced by: Mark Gordon; Amy Pascal; Matt Jackson
- Starring: Jessica Chastain; Idris Elba; Kevin Costner; Michael Cera; Jeremy Strong; Chris O'Dowd; Bill Camp
- Cinematography: Charlotte Bruus Christensen
- Edited by: Alan Baumgarten; Josh Schaeffer; Elliot Graham
- Music by: Daniel Pemberton
- Production companies: STXfilms; H. Brothers; TMP; The MG Company
- Distributed by: STX Entertainment (United States and China); Sierra/Affinity (International)
- Release dates: September 8, 2017 (TIFF); January 5, 2018 (United States)
- Running time: 141 minutes
- Country: United States
- Language: English
- Budget: $30 million
- Box office: $59.3 million

Molly's Game is a 2017 American biographical film written and directed by Aaron Sorkin (in his directorial debut), based on the 2014 memoir by Molly Bloom. The film follows Molly, a former Olympic-class skier, as she runs the world's most exclusive underground poker empire and becomes the target of an FBI investigation. It stars Jessica Chastain as Molly, with Idris Elba as her lawyer and Kevin Costner as her father, alongside Michael Cera, Jeremy Strong, Chris O'Dowd, Joe Keery, Brian d'Arcy James, and Bill Camp.

The film shows her rise and fall as the "Poker Princess", building poker empires in L.A. and New York. Her poker players include some of the wealthiest, most powerful men in the world: movie stars, elite athletes, billionaire business magnates, and, unbeknownst to her, the Russian mafia.

Molly's Game received positive reviews, with praise for Sorkin's screenplay and Chastain and Elba's performances. Chastain's performance was regarded by critics as one of the best of her career, earning her a Golden Globe nomination for Best Actress – Drama. Sorkin's screenplay earned him nominations for the Academy Awards, Golden Globes, Writers Guild of America Awards, and BAFTA Awards.

Principal photography began in November 2016 in Toronto, Ontario, Canada. The film premiered on September 8, 2017, at the Toronto International Film Festival, and began a limited theatrical release in the United States on December 25, 2017, by STX Entertainment. It went to world-wide distribution on January 5, 2018, grossing $59 million worldwide.

== Plot ==
Molly Bloom is a world-class mogul skier, trained from a young age by her overbearing father, until a career-ending injury during a qualifying event for the 2002 Winter Olympics. Postponing her law school plans, she moves to Los Angeles where, working as a bottle service waitress, she meets real estate developer Dean Keith. He hires her as his round-the-clock office manager, and soon orders her to run his weekly underground poker game at The Cobra Lounge. Molly learns how to appeal to the rich and famous players, particularly the movie star "Player X".

Frustrated by Molly's large tips, Dean fires her, but she poaches his players for her own lucrative and technically legal poker game. After the skilled but risk-averse Harlan Eustice loses a hand to hedge fund manager Brad Marion, a notoriously bad player, Harlan makes increasingly desperate bets on tilt until he owes Molly $1.2 million he cannot pay. Player X loans Harlan the money in exchange for half of his ongoing winnings, revealing that he has been staking Harlan for years. Bitter over Molly's disapproval and lack of romantic interest in him, Player X spitefully draws her players to another game, and her poker ring collapses.

Moving to New York City, Molly enlists models to recruit wealthy players as she establishes a new underground poker empire. With millions at stake, her dealer convinces her to take a percentage of the pot to offset potential losses, making the game an illegal gambling operation. When Brad's hedge fund is exposed as a Ponzi scheme, he points law enforcement to Molly, who pays $500,000 in restitution to his victims rather than testify. The stress of her high-stakes life takes a toll as she becomes addicted to drugs, and allows wealthy members of the Russian mafia to join her game.

Molly's driver introduces her to the Italian mafia, but she declines to let them extort her players. In retaliation, a gunman attacks Molly in her home, stealing the contents of her safe and threatening to kill her and her mother. Unwilling to go to a hospital, Molly spends two weeks recuperating alone in her apartment, only to learn the mobsters have been caught up in unrelated arrests. Douglas Downey, a player infatuated with Molly, warns her that he has been forced to inform on her to the FBI. Her game is raided while over $4 million is seized from her bank account, and a penniless Molly moves home with her mother.

Two years since running her last game, Molly has published a memoir to pay her debts, and is arrested by heavily armed FBI agents for her former inadvertent ties to organized crime. She meets with high-profile attorney Charlie Jaffey, who unexpectedly takes her case after realizing that she refused to work with the mob. Charlie negotiates for Molly to receive immunity and her seized funds in exchange for her hard drives, but Molly refuses to risk destroying her players' lives and tarnishing her own name.

Skating recklessly at an ice rink, Molly is shocked to see her estranged father, and they share an honest conversation about their difficult relationship. Asked why he treated her differently than her brothers, her father explains that Molly knew he was cheating on her mother, and he expressed his shame as anger. Shaken after learning about her attack from her book, he reconciles with his daughter.

Molly pleads guilty, taking responsibility to preserve the integrity of her name. The judge, deciding that she never committed any serious crime, sentences her to 200 hours of community service, one year of probation, and a $200,000 fine. Remembering her skiing accident, Molly considers her future and her own resilience.

=== Literary references ===
Sorkin's script contains many literary references. When one of the players, Douglas Downey, asks her if she likes poetry and misquotes Robert Frost's poem "The Road Not Taken", Molly sarcastically responds, "I did until a second ago." When the same player assumes Molly is Irish, she points to the possible source of his confusion, the character Molly Bloom in James Joyce's novel Ulysses which is set in Dublin, Ireland. In that novel, Molly's final stream-of-consciousness narration with its recurring exclamations of "yes, yes", ending the novel with a "Yes." is mirrored in a speech by Molly punctuated by "no" exclamations. In the same scene, referencing Homer's Odyssey, Molly compares herself to Circe who turned Odysseus's men into swine. Molly's lawyer asks his daughter to read Arthur Miller's The Crucible, and later, when Molly insists on pleading guilty to protect the reputation of her name, echoing John Proctor's action, he remarks, "O, we have read The Crucible, have we?" When she complains about her situation to her father, he called her "Tiny Tim", from Charles Dickens' novel A Christmas Carol, and she compares figures from the Brooklyn Russian Mafia to the cast of Jersey Boys. Overall, Molly is drawn like a tragic heroine with a fatal flaw in a Greek tragedy – which includes the deus ex machina conclusion by the sentencing judge.

== Cast ==
- Jessica Chastain as Molly Bloom
  - Piper Howell as 7-year-old Molly Bloom
  - Samantha Isler as Teen Molly Bloom
- Idris Elba as Charlie Jaffey, Molly's lawyer
- Kevin Costner as Larry Bloom, Molly's father and a clinical psychologist
- Michael Cera as Player X, a composite character based on interactions with Tobey Maguire and the popularity of Leonardo DiCaprio, as the two actors always played together
- Jeremy Strong as Dean Keith, the real estate developer who brings Molly into the world of underground poker; inspired by Darin Feinstein
- Chris O'Dowd as Douglas Downey, the man who introduces Molly to the Russian mob and brings them to the table
- J. C. MacKenzie as Harrison Wellstone
- Brian d'Arcy James as Brad Marion, a hedge fund manager
- Bill Camp as Harlan Eustice, a card sharp who gets in over his head
- Graham Greene as Judge Dustin Foxman
- Justin Kirk as Jay
- Angela Gots as B
- Natalie Krill as Winston
- Stephanie Herfield as Jesse
- Madison McKinley as Shelby
- Joe Keery as Cole
- Michael Kostroff as Louis Butterman
- Claire Rankin as Charlene Bloom, Molly's mother and Larry's wife
- Jon Bass as Shelly Habib
- Kjartan Hewitt as Player
- Jacob Blair as Jeremy Bloom, Molly's brother
- Dan Lett as David Segan
- Rachel Skarsten as Leah
- Dov Tiefenbach as Club Customer
- David Reale as LA Player
- Jake Goldsbie as LA Player
- Chris Owens as LA Player
- Thomas Hauff as Mr. Sernovitz
- Ari Cohen as NY Player
- Madison McKinley as Shelby

== Production ==
=== Development ===
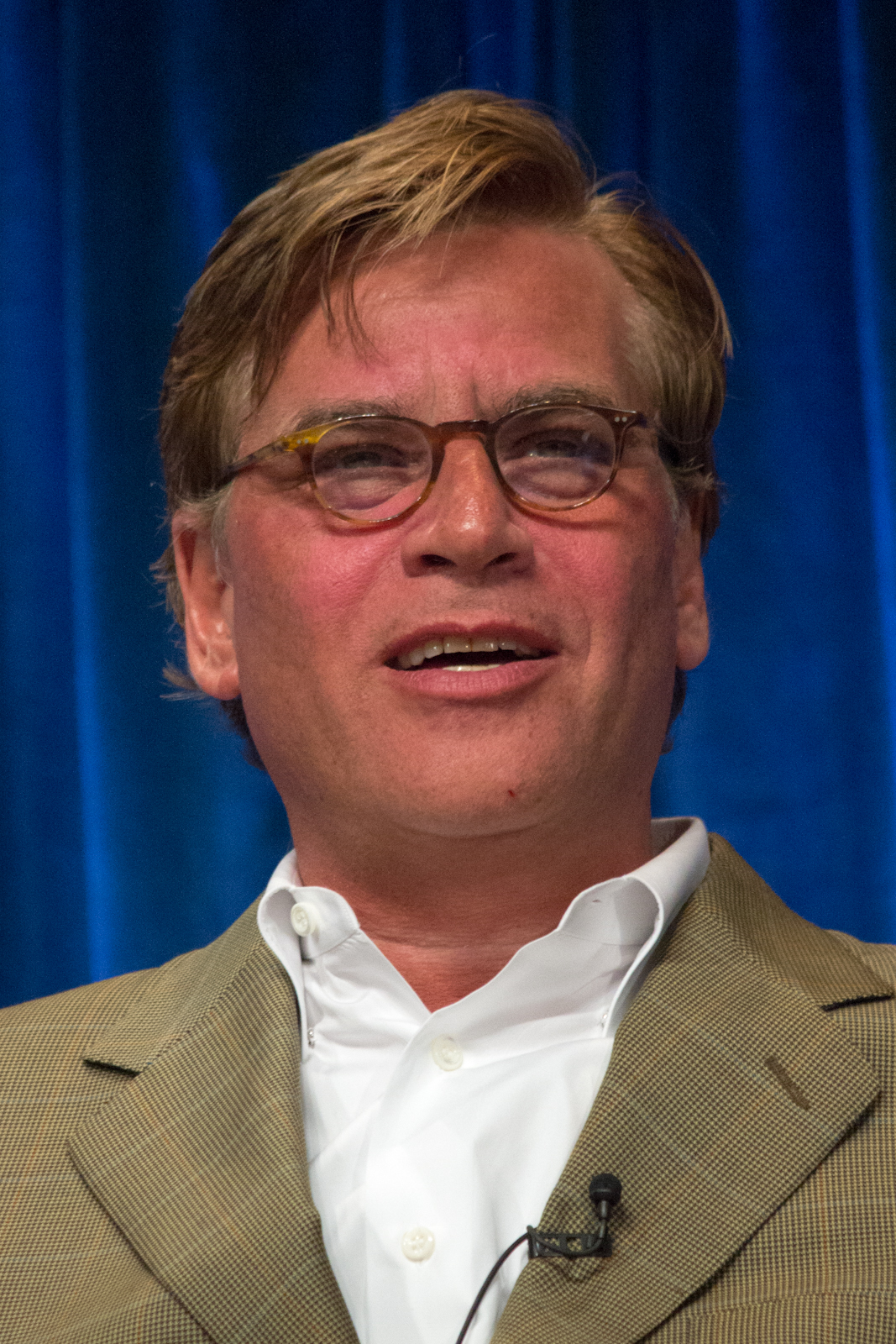
Screenwriter Aaron Sorkin, who made his directorial debut on the film

On November 12, 2014, Mark Gordon's The Mark Gordon Company bought the feature film adaptation rights to Molly Bloom's memoir, Molly's Game, which Gordon produced. Aaron Sorkin was hired to adapt the memoir into a screenplay. Bloom had already approached Sorkin, as he was her "favorite writer". On January 7, 2016, it was announced that Sorkin would make his directorial debut on the film, for Sony Pictures Entertainment, while Amy Pascal also produced. With this being his directorial debut, Sorkin specifically worked very closely with his cinematographer, Charlotte Bruus Christensen. On February 18, 2016, Sony exited the project, and on May 13, 2016, STX Entertainment came on board, and subsequently bought the film's US and Chinese distribution rights for $9 million.

=== Casting ===
On February 18, 2016, Sorkin offered Jessica Chastain the lead role in the film, but the negotiations between them had then not yet begun. On May 6, 2016, Idris Elba joined the film to star alongside Chastain. Sorkin stated that "the casting of Jessica and Idris in the two lead roles is any filmmaker's dream come true, they're two of the greatest actors of their generation, paired for the first time, and their chemistry will be electric." On September 7, 2016, Michael Cera joined the cast as Player X, a celebrity poker player. On October 17, 2016, Kevin Costner joined as Molly Bloom's father, and on October 21, 2016, Brian d'Arcy James was added. On November 9, 2016, Chris O'Dowd, Jeremy Strong, Bill Camp, and Graham Greene joined the cast as well.

Molly Bloom herself discussed Chastain's portrayal of her character with ET Canada stating, "We spent a little time together. She didn't have much time for prep or research", Bloom told ET Canada's Matte Babel. "I was blown away by her performance by how right it was and how deep and understood I felt by her performance."

=== Filming ===
Principal photography began on November 9, 2016, in Toronto. Production concluded on February 9, 2017.

== Release ==
Molly's Game premiered on September 8, 2017, at the Toronto International Film Festival. It was also the closing film at AFI Fest on November 16, 2017, replacing All the Money in the World. It began a limited release in North America on December 25, 2017, before expanding wide on January 5, 2018. The film was previously slated to be released on November 22, 2017, before being moved to the Christmas date in October 2017.

== Reception ==
=== Box office ===
Molly's Game grossed $28.8 million in the United States and Canada, and $30.5 million in other territories, for a worldwide total of $59.3 million.

On Christmas Day, the film debuted with $1.04 million from 271 theaters. In its first full weekend, the film grossed $2.3 million, finishing 13th at the box office. The film expanded wide on January 5, 2018, alongside the opening of Insidious: The Last Key, and was projected to gross around $6 million from 1,608 theaters in its opening weekend. It ended up debuting to $6.9 million, finishing 7th at the box office. The following weekend it dropped 44% to $3.9 million, finishing 11th. In its third week of wide release the film grossed $1.7 million, finishing 19th.

The film also grossed a total of $4.5 million in France and $5.3 million in the United Kingdom.

=== Critical response ===
On review aggregator Rotten Tomatoes, the film has an approval rating of 82% based on 304 reviews, with an average rating of 7.10/10. The website's critical consensus reads, "Powered by an intriguing story and a pair of outstanding performances from Jessica Chastain and Idris Elba, Molly's Game marks a solid debut for writer-director Aaron Sorkin." On Metacritic, the film has a weighted average score of 71 out of 100, based on 46 critics, indicating "generally favorable reviews". Audiences polled by CinemaScore gave the film an average grade of "A−" on an A+ to F scale.

Peter Debruge of Variety praised Sorkin's script, saying, "... Molly's Game delivers one of the screen's great female parts — a dense, dynamic, compulsively entertaining affair, whose central role makes stunning use of Chastain's stratospheric talent." Mike Ryan of Uproxx gave the film 9/10, writing, "Molly's Game is a perfect story for Sorkin. There's poker, the Russian mafia, the Italian mafia, celebrities, and sports. The only thing missing for Sorkin's wheelhouse is President Bartlet. And at over two hours long, the film still feels tight and never fails to entertain."

Writing for Rolling Stone, Peter Travers gave the film 3 out of 4 stars, saying, "Molly's Game bristles with fun zingers, electric energy and Sorkin's brand of verbal fireworks – all of which help enormously when the movie falters in fleshing out its characters. Still, in his first film with a female protagonist, the writer-director has hit on a timely theme: the tribulations of being a woman in a man's world." Todd McCarthy of The Hollywood Reporter praised Chastain's portrayal of Molly Bloom, saying "Chastain roars through the performance with a force and take-no-prisoners attitude that keeps one rapt." McCarthy also stated: "Sorkin keeps things rolling relentlessly and gets fine results from the actors down the line ... The film looks sharp and a trio of editors keeps thing pacey despite the 140-minute running time." It concluded: "One strong woman and many rich men make for a good show."

=== Accolades ===
Award	Date of ceremony	Category	Recipient(s)	Result	Ref.
AARP's Movies for Grownups Awards	February 5, 2018	Best Screenwriter	Aaron Sorkin	Won	
Academy Awards	March 4, 2018	Best Adapted Screenplay	Aaron Sorkin	Nominated	
Alliance of Women Film Journalists	January 9, 2018	Best Adapted Screenplay	Aaron Sorkin	Nominated	
American Cinema Editors	January 26, 2018	Best Edited Feature Film – Dramatic	Alan Baumgarten, Elliot Graham and Josh Schaeffer	Nominated	
British Academy Film Awards	February 18, 2018	Best Adapted Screenplay	Aaron Sorkin	Nominated	
Critics' Choice Movie Awards	January 11, 2018	Best Actress	Jessica Chastain	Nominated	
Critics' Choice Movie Awards	January 11, 2018	Best Adapted Screenplay	Aaron Sorkin	Nominated	
Denver International Film Festival	November 13, 2017	Career Achievement Award	Aaron Sorkin	Won	
Detroit Film Critics Society	December 7, 2017	Best Actress	Jessica Chastain	Nominated	
Florida Film Critics Circle	December 23, 2017	Best Screenplay – Adapted	Aaron Sorkin	Nominated	
Georgia Film Critics Association	January 12, 2018	Best Actress	Jessica Chastain	Nominated	
Georgia Film Critics Association	January 12, 2018	Best Adapted Screenplay	Aaron Sorkin	Nominated	
Golden Globe Awards	January 7, 2018	Best Actress in a Motion Picture – Drama	Jessica Chastain	Nominated	
Golden Globe Awards	January 7, 2018	Best Screenplay	Aaron Sorkin	Nominated	
Mill Valley Film Festival	October 17, 2017	Audience Favorite U.S. Cinema – Gold Award	Molly's Game	Won	
Palm Springs International Film Festival	January 2, 2018	Chairman's Award	Jessica Chastain	Won	
Producers Guild of America Awards	January 20, 2018	Best Theatrical Motion Picture	Mark Gordon, Amy Pascal and Matt Jackson	Nominated	
San Francisco Film Critics Circle	December 10, 2017	Best Adapted Screenplay	Aaron Sorkin	Nominated	
Satellite Awards	February 10, 2018	Best Actress	Jessica Chastain	Nominated	
Satellite Awards	February 10, 2018	Best Adapted Screenplay	Aaron Sorkin	Nominated	
USC Scripter Awards	February 10, 2018	Best Screenplay	Aaron Sorkin and Molly Bloom	Nominated	
Washington D.C. Area Film Critics Association	December 8, 2017	Best Adapted Screenplay	Aaron Sorkin	Nominated	
Writers Guild of America Awards	February 11, 2018	Best Adapted Screenplay	Aaron Sorkin	Nominated	
Zurich Film Festival	October 4, 2017	Career Achievement Award	Aaron Sorkin	Won	
