= The Viper Room =

Nightclub in West Hollywood, California US

Coordinates: 34°5′25.7″N 118°23′4.8″W

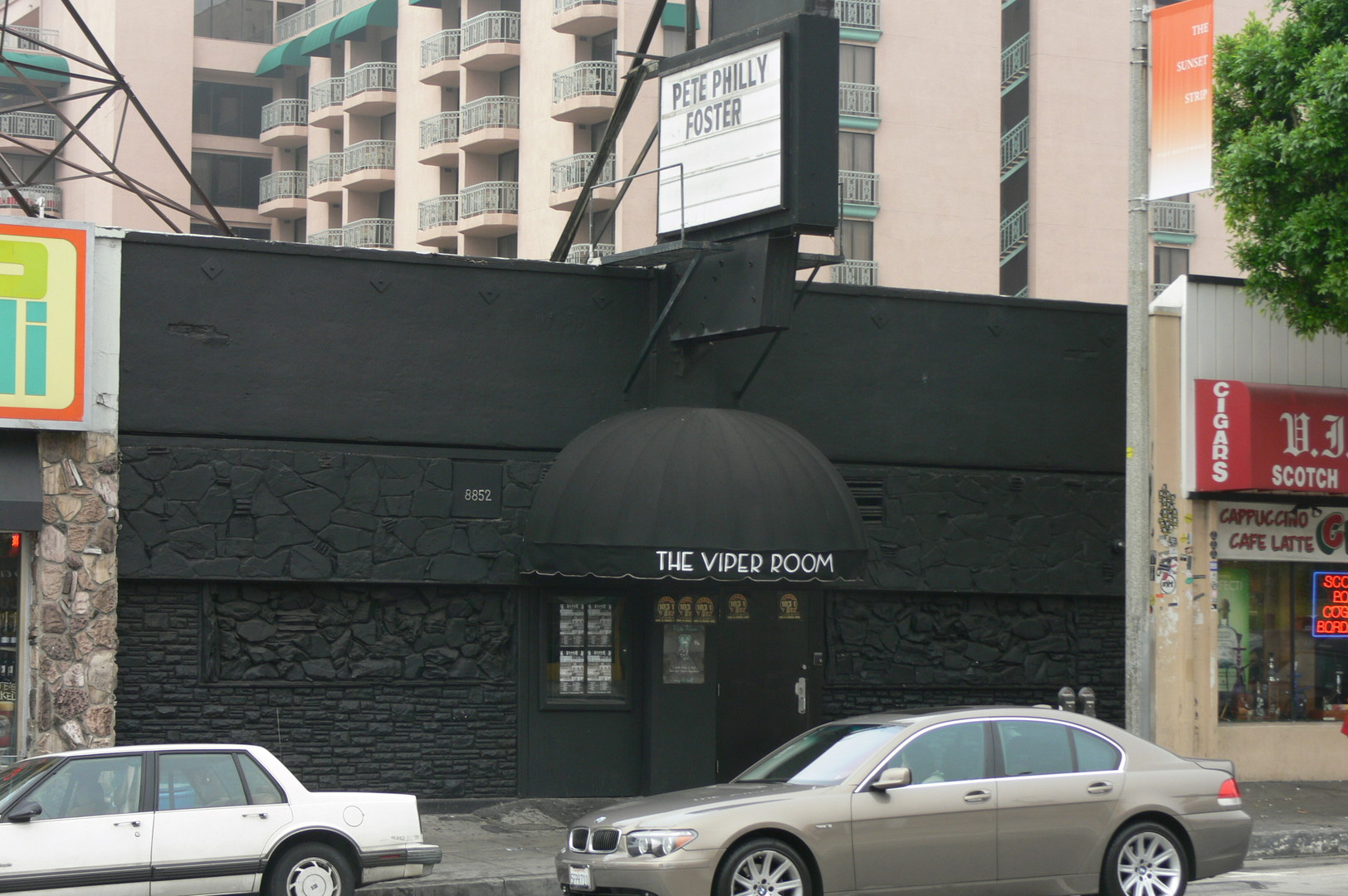
- The Viper Room in 2006
- Interactive map of The Viper Room
- Address: 8852 Sunset Boulevard
- Location: West Hollywood, California, 90069; United States
- Capacity: 250
- Type: Nightclub
- Event: Rock

Construction
- Opened: August 14, 1993

Website
- www.viperroom.com

The Viper Room is a nightclub and live music venue located on the Sunset Strip in West Hollywood, California, United States. It was established under that name on August 14, 1993, then co-owned by actors and 21 Jump Street co-stars Johnny Depp and Sal Jenco. The Viper Room has undergone several changes in ownership. The latest owner is Viper Holdings, Ltd CEO James Cooper. It continues to host music of multiple genres, including metal, punk, and alternative rock. While predominantly known as a music venue, the Viper Room also has a lower level which is home to a large whiskey bar.

The club became known as a hangout for the young Hollywood elite, and gained infamy for its drug-related incidents; actor River Phoenix had a fatal drug overdose in 1993, actor Jason Donovan suffered a drug-induced seizure in 1995 but survived, and singer Courtney Love survived an overdose in 1995 after Depp gave her CPR. In 1997, singer Michael Hutchence played his last public performance in the Viper Room before taking his own life a week later.

== History ==
The location was originally a grocery store from 1921 into the 1940s. In the 1940s, it was converted into a nightclub called the "Cotton Club", entirely unrelated to the Harlem original. This was soon replaced by "The Greenwich Village Inn", the "Rue Angel", and finally "The Last Call" during the 1940s. From 1951 to 1969, the location was a bar called "The Melody Lounge", in 1969, it became "Filthy McNasty's", and in the 1980s, a jazz club called "The Central".

"The Central" was best known for its Tuesday jam nights where various well-known musicians such as Joe Cocker, Brian Setzer and Jeff Baxter performed and hung out along with others in the music industry. It also hosted many local music acts such as Chuck E. Weiss who was frequently accompanied by the Goddamn Liars. In 1993, the club was close to shutting down when Weiss suggested to Depp that he should revitalize the spot and rename it "The Viper Room". Tom Waits also had a hand in redeveloping the spot.

=== The venue ===
Despite the being the location of River Phoenix's death just two and a half months after opening, the club became and remained a hangout for Hollywood's most popular young actors and musicians. Adam Duritz, the lead singer of Counting Crows, worked as a Viper Room bartender in late 1994 and early 1995 to escape his newfound fame.

=== Ownership ===
As part of the settlement of a lawsuit against Johnny Depp and four others, involving allegations of mismanagement of profits, Depp relinquished his ownership of the Viper Room in 2004. The club changed hands multiple times between 2004 and 2016; the club is currently owned by Viper Room Holdings, Ltd. CEO James Cooper.

=== Intellectual property and lawsuits ===
Another nightclub formerly called "The Viper Room" exists in Cincinnati. That club changed its name to "The Poison Room" on January 1, 2006, after they were told by the West Hollywood Viper Room to stop using the name. Another "Viper Room" in Portland was also told to stop using the name under threat of a trademark lawsuit, with the Viper Room's former owner claiming that "every dollar they make is the result of using our name". Abroad, there is also a legal brothel in Brisbane called "The Viper Room" and nightclubs boasting the name (or a similar one) in Harrogate, Sheffield, Stockholm, and Vienna.

Until February 2009, there was a nightclub with the same name in Melbourne; it was closed down due to a spate of violent incidents that included two shootings as well as license breaches and the arrest of a co-owner on drug charges. On April 16, 2011, a nightclub named "The Viper Room" opened its doors in the city of Nijmegen in the Netherlands. The club is named after the club in Hollywood and is decorated in the same style as the American club. In 2016, The Viper Room began issuing cease and desist notices to bootleg merchandise sellers on eBay and other online storefronts.

=== Redevelopment plans ===
In 2018, Silver Creek Development purchased four retail properties comprising the entire block of Sunset Boulevard between San Vicente Boulevard to Larrabee Street, including the building which houses the Viper Room, for $80 million.

In 2019, they announced plans to demolish all the existing buildings in order to make way for a 15-story, 369,000-square foot, 200 ft tall, mixed-use building, featuring "a large interior opening through two connected towers", and which would include a gym, a movie screening room, a 15th floor restaurant, a rooftop pool, a 115-room hotel, ground-floor commercial space, as well as 31 condominiums, 10 units of affordable housing, and parking for 269 vehicles. The new building would also feature "a new home" for the Viper Room. Pending approval from the City of West Hollywood, the company said they anticipated to begin construction in 2021, with completion set for 2024.

However in March 2022, after hiring a new architecture firm and having "taken public input on the project", Silver Creek Development unveiled a new, revised design for the project, slightly scaled down to 12 stories, with, 26 condominiums, 8 affordable housing units, a 113-room hotel, as well as retail space, eateries, cafes, a recording studio space, and a "re-designed music venue" with "memorabilia from the original Viper Room" to feature throughout; Silver Creek also own the Viper Room business and IP rights. The developers mentioned a potential completion date of 2025. In August 2022, Silver Creek Development secured a $62 million loan for the project from Cottonwood, an L.A.-based private equity and real estate investment firm.

In 2023, the plan was revised again, now with a proposed 11 stories with 62 apartments, 14 affordable units, and a 90-room hotel. Eventually a version of the proposal was submitted to the city council, and in August 2024, was narrowly approved in a 3–2 vote. The two dissenting members "expressed concerns that the property developer would be able to finish the project."

By May 2025, the project was in foreclosure, and records showed the developers had defaulted on more than $69 million dollars of debt. However Silver Creek secured another $71 million predevelopment loan from Centennial Bank and Crestline Investors just before the site was scheduled to go to auction in June, thus reviving the project once more.

The redevelopment proposal has attracted criticism and pushback since its inception. On multiple occasions, members of the local community have expressed concerns about potential impacts on the neighborhood. Elyse Eisenberg, a local resident, said the developers had "sidestepped the question about community pushback", failed to address their concerns, and "kept pushing through the same project with superficial tweaks but never received support from the community for this project".

The project has also drawn opposition from those concerned about preserving the Viper Room as a significant site of both local and "rock 'n' roll" history. At a public hearing, one resident remarked "Tourists want the real funky Viper Room, where River Phoenix died. They want the Whisky, where the Doors, Guns N' Roses, Johnny Rivers and Motley Crue started out". At another meeting Matt Harkenrider, a resident artist at the Viper Room, described the venue as "the only place I, for the first time, have been able to grow a following and actually make money from my art," and noted that people who visit the Sunset Strip are there for the history.

In November 2025, Silver Creek Development said they are "now aiming for a 2029 opening, without putting a firm date to the start of demolition or vertical work."

As of 2026, there is no scheduled demolition date, and the club is still a popular live music venue which has continued to operate as normal.

== Performers ==
At Depp's request, Tom Petty and the Heartbreakers performed on the club's opening night.

Johnny Cash performed at the venue, debuting material that would later appear on American Recordings (1994).

Other performers have included Avril Lavigne, Neurotic Outsiders (featuring Duff McKagan, Steve Jones and John Taylor), Keanu Reeves (who performed there with his band Dogstar in 1997), The Cult, Slash, X, Julliette and the Licks, Concrete Blonde, Green Day, Courtney Love, Hole, Joey Ramone, The Smashing Pumpkins, Tenacious D, The Strokes, Cher, Lenny Kravitz, Sheryl Crow, and Pearl Jam, among many others.

== In popular culture ==
- In the 1983 film Valley Girl, the building (then housing a nightclub called The Central) was used for scenes featuring the new-wave band the Plimsouls.
- In Oliver Stone's film The Doors (1991), the building was used as a filming location for scenes depicting the London Fog, also of West Hollywood. London Fog was a lesser-known nightclub halfway up the same block from the Whisky a Go Go where the Doors had their first regular gigs for four months in early 1966.
- The 2003 Charlie's Angels: Full Throttle "Pink Panther Dance" scene was filmed at the club, though the club's name was changed in the film to "The Treasure Chest".
- Several scenes in the 2005 John Travolta film Be Cool were set at or in the club, although only the exterior of the site was used in the shoot.
- The Viper Room is also featured in the 2004 documentary Dig! when members of the band The Brian Jonestown Massacre began brawling with each other on stage while performing.
- The Viper Room was once the base of an underground poker ring, reportedly founded by actor Tobey Maguire. The ring often included other actors such as Ben Affleck, Leonardo DiCaprio, and Matt Damon. It was setting for the initial set of poker games Molly Bloom hosted., whose autobiography was turned into the 2017 movie Molly's Game, starring Jessica Chastain. In the film, the club was renamed "The Cobra Lounge".
- The Viper Room is featured in an episode of paranormal series Ghost Adventures as one of their lockdown locations, where they investigated the building for two days. In 2019, BuzzFeed Unsolved Supernatural filmed an episode in the club.
- In 2019, the music video for the song "Blow" by Ed Sheeran, Chris Stapleton, and Bruno Mars was filmed at the Viper Room.
- In 2021, the Viper Room was the feature of season 1, episode 2 of Vice Media's Dark Side of the 90's entitled "The Viper Room: Hollywood's Sanctuary."

== See also ==
- Rainbow Bar and Grill
- Rodney Bingenheimer's English Disco
- The Roxy Theatre
- Sunset Strip
- Whisky a Go Go
