= 2007 Broadway stagehand strike =

Labor dispute in the United States

The 2007 Broadway Stagehands Strike was a strike action by stagehands represented by Theatrical Protective Union Number One (Local One) of the International Alliance of Theatrical Stage Employees (IATSE) against the Shubert, Jujamcyn, and Nederlander theaters (represented by League of American Theatres and Producers). The strike (the first in the union's 121-year history) commenced on November 10, 2007, at 10:00 A.M. in New York City. It was the second strike on Broadway in five years (the other was the 2003 Broadway Musicians Strike).

On November 28, 2007, at 10:30 pm, the two sides announced a settlement to end the strike, with shows beginning the evening of November 29. This was the longest strike to hit Broadway since a 25-day musicians' strike in 1975.

== Background ==
IATSE Local One engages in collective bargaining with the League of American Theatres and Producers (the League), an association of Broadway theater owners and producers.

IATSE Local One was formed in 1886, and represents about 7,000 stagehands and other theater workers in the New York City area. Roughly 450 to 700 of its members work for Broadway theaters, building, installing and operating scenery and sound and lighting equipment.

The League includes nearly every one of the 39 theaters on Broadway. The Jujamcyn Amusement Corporation owns five theaters, The Shubert Organization 17 theaters, and the Nederlander Organization nine theaters. The remaining members of the League (Disney Theatrical, Live Nation and six nonprofits) each own a single theater. Generally, Jujamcyn and the Shubert Organization are the only owners represented by the League in negotiations. The Nederlander Organization has a separate contract, but a clause in the contract guarantees that its terms and conditions reflect the contract reached with the League. The remaining members engage in individual contract negotiations with IATSE Local One.

== Events ==
The collective bargaining agreement between Local One and the League expired in the summer of 2007. Members of Local One agreed to work without a contract and promised other unions in the entertainment industry that they would not strike until an agreement was reached. In late summer, Local One and the League, representing the Shubert and Jujamcyn theaters with the Nederlander Organization observing, entered into negotiations.

=== Contract issues ===
Contract negotiations generally focused on work rules. Broadway shows offer a standard eight performances per week ("performance calls"), each of which lasts three to four hours. Additionally, there are "load-ins" (periods during which a show moves into a theater), rehearsals, "maintenance calls" (during which scenery, lighting and sound equipment are serviced, repaired and maintained), and opportunities for overtime. The League has accused the union of using its contract to secure featherbedding, a practice made illegal by the federal Taft-Hartley Act. Among the work rule changes sought by the League were:

- Loosening load-in rules: The load-in period may last several weeks and cost $1 million or more. Current work rules require producers to determine ahead of time how many stagehands are needed on each given day. These numbers cannot change once load-in begins, requiring producers to pay salaries even if no work occurs. The rule ensures that workers will not be on call (and unpaid for it) during the load-in period. The producers proposed essentially eliminating the rule. The union agreed to loosen the rule, but sought to keep a minimum number of stagehands at work each day.
- Overtime: The existing contract stated that if any stagehand is required to work overtime during a load-in, all workers must stay and be paid overtime. The producers proposed loosening the rule so that producers determined how many stagehands would stay and earn overtime. The union agreed to discuss modifying the contract, but only if the League agreed to strengthen other parts of the contract.
- Performance and continuity calls: The existing contract stated that stagehands could only perform work related to the performance during a performance call. If the producer wishes the stagehand to perform other duties, the producer must issue a one-hour "continuity call," even if the stagehand has no more work to do. If the one-hour continuity call is not long enough, producers are required to pay for a four-hour shift. Producers call the rule wasteful, but the union claimed the rule discouraged theaters from forcing employees to work past midnight. The union also noted that many stagehands supplement their income with daytime jobs, and late nights significantly interfere with these arrangements. Producers proposed widening the tasks stagehands may perform during performance calls and reducing the required four hours of pay. The union had agreed to discuss reducing the required four hours of pay in exchange for improving other benefits.
- Wages: There are four classes of stagehands. Head carpenters and electricians, who are in the top category, made about $1,600 a week. Most stagehands (riggers, winch-workers and operators) were in the lowest class, making about $1,200 a week. The union claimed that the proposed rule changes would cut workers salaries by 38 percent. The League offered different pay raises for different classes of workers, but the union argued these did not make up for the lost income.

Many labor relations experts said that the negotiations were not about work rules or economics, but the relative power of the two sides. Producers, who pay the theater owners, are also part of the League, and for the first time they took a vocal and active role in pushing for contract changes in order to break the union's control over theater management. Subsequently the League established a $20 million "defense fund" to help theaters weather a strike. In response, the union established a $4 million fund to help its members during a possible job action.

=== Negotiations and strike ===
Contract negotiations stalled between the two parties and the league threatened Local One with a lockout if it would not comply with their demands. On October 21, Local One held a special meeting and its membership voted to authorize the executive board of the union to take any action deemed necessary, including but not limited to a strike, in order to reach an agreement between the two parties.

In late October 2007, talks between Local One and the League again ended in a stalemate. On October 16, the League imposed a portion of its final offer (primarily, the proposals regarding new work rules) on the union. For two weeks Local One worked under these rules before talks with the League resumed. The following day, the Nederlander Organization announced it would not join the Jujamcyn or Schubert owners in imposing the final offer on the union.

On November 8, talks with the League resumed, this time including Thomas C. Short, international president of IATSE, for part of the negotiation session. After seeing progress being made, President Short left the talks early to assist members affected by the 2007 Writers Guild of America strike. After his departure, the negotiations once more ground to a halt. On the evening of November 9, Local One President James Claffey, Jr. was directed by International President Short to begin a strike on Saturday, November 10, 2007 at 10:00 AM Eastern time.

Negotiations resumed between both sides on November 17, 2007 but broke off the following day. All performances of the affected Broadway shows were canceled through November 25. Negotiations between the League and Local One resumed on November 25.

Negotiations continued November 26 and November 27. The first bargaining session began November 25, and lasted 20 hours. It recessed at dawn on November 26, and resumed later that evening. A 13-hour bargaining session lasted through the night into the early morning hours of November 27. The two sides agreed on work rules regarding "load-in"—the period when productions are moved into theaters. Talks concerning work rules governing rehearsals and other kinds of work progressed only slowly and incrementally. Economic issues, such as wages, had yet to be seriously discussed. Although producers canceled all shows through Wednesday, November 28, observers noted that the talks had only taken a break and had not appeared to actually break off.

=== Strike's end ===
Both sides applauded the agreement. The union and League agreed to flexibility in the ability to dismiss stagehands during load-in, so long as there was a daily minimum of 17 stagehands on duty at all times. The parties also agreed to extend the continuity call to two hours before or after a performance. However, employees who work the post-performance continuity call earn double pay for the first hour of the two-hour continuity call. Union members also won raises significantly higher than the 3.5 percent increase the League had publicly offered.

The strike was a costly one. At least one estimate placed losses by theater owners and producers at $34.8 million through Sunday, November 25. The New York City comptroller's office said the city had lost another $40 million in revenue through November 28.

== Unions Honoring the Strike ==
Below is a list of unions and IATSE Locals honoring Local One's strike:

- All Pink Contract IATSE Stagehands employed in affected buildings
- IATSE Theatrical Wardrobe Union, Local 764
- IATSE Treasurers and Ticket Takers, Local 751
- Actors Equity Association, The union of professional Actors and Stage Managers (AEA)
- American Federation of Musicians, Local 802
- IATSE Theater Ushers Union, Local 306
- United Scenic Artists, IATSE Local 829
- IATSE Hairstylist and Make-Up Artist Local 798

== Effects of the strike ==
The first show to be affected by the strike was Dr. Seuss' How the Grinch Stole Christmas! The Musical at the St. James Theatre. Stagehands reported to work at their normal time, and after one hour of working left the building and formed picket lines outside. However, because the controlling contract fell outside the union dispute, pickets in front of the theater ended.

The strike halted business for all other affected shows. However, unaffected Broadway shows, various Off-Broadway and Off-Off-Broadway productions, and other live entertainment such as the Radio City Christmas Spectacular and Wintuk, all experienced a boom in sales and attendance.

The impact of the strike was severe. The New York City Comptroller estimated that the city had lost $2 million a day in tax revenue because of the strike. Many businesses in and around Times Square also suffered significant financial losses. The charity group Broadway Cares/Equity Fights AIDS saw a dramatic drop in donations due to the strike, because it normally relies on donations from theater patrons after performances. BC/EFA launched an internet donation campaign called "Team Raiser" to offset losses. During the 2007 Macy's Thanksgiving Day Parade, Legally Blonde was the only show performing that was affected by the strike. As a result, instead of performing the show in full costumes, the cast wore merchandise T-shirts.

Below is a list of shows affected and unaffected by the strike. All Off- and Off-Off-Broadway shows were unaffected.

=== Running shows affected by the strike ===
- Avenue Q
- A Bronx Tale
- Chicago
- A Chorus Line
- The Color Purple
- Curtains
- Cyrano de Bergerac
- The Drowsy Chaperone
- Duran Duran — This show finished its run. The final three shows were combined to two dates and relocated to the Roseland Ballroom.
- Grease
- Hairspray
- Jersey Boys
- Legally Blonde
- Les Misérables
- The Lion King
- Mamma Mia!
- Monty Python's Spamalot
- The Phantom of the Opera
- Rent
- Rock 'n' Roll
- Spring Awakening — the cast at the time performed the songs from Spring Awakening on the street outside the Eugene O'Neill Theatre.
- Wicked

=== Affected shows that resolved their dispute ===
Dr. Seuss' How the Grinch Stole Christmas! The Musical was originally part of the strike, and shut down on November 10 like the other affected shows. The producers of this show were not members of the League, and because of the show's special schedule they had negotiated a separate contract with Local One that was not in dispute. On November 19, the union authorized its members return to work on the show. However, the owners of the St. James Theater, Jujamcyn Theatres, locked out both producers and stagehands, keeping the show closed. The producers then sought an injunction in the Manhattan Supreme Court to force the owners to reopen the theater, and on November 21 the judge granted the injunction, allowing the show to re-open on Friday, November 23 at 11:00 AM. Jujamcyn Theatres had planned to appeal the ruling, but dropped the case, allowing Grinch to play its entire run.

=== Shows in previews affected by the strike ===
- August: Osage County—The official opening of this show (originally November 20) was postponed until December 4.
- Is He Dead?—The official opening of this show (originally November 29) was postponed until December 9.
- The Farnsworth Invention—The official opening of this show (originally November 14) was postponed until December 3.
- The Seafarer—The official opening of this show (originally November 15) was postponed until December 6.
- The Little Mermaid—The official opening (originally December 6) was postponed until January 10, 2008.
- The Homecoming—The previews for this show, originally scheduled to begin November 23, were postponed until December 4.

=== Broadway shows not affected ===
- Xanadu
- The Ritz
- Mauritius
- Cymbeline
- Pygmalion
- The 25th Annual Putnam County Spelling Bee
- Young Frankenstein
- Mary Poppins
- The Third Annual Benefit Concert: A Cause For Celebration! (One-time only benefit)
