= The Farnsworth Invention =

Play written by Aaron Sorkin

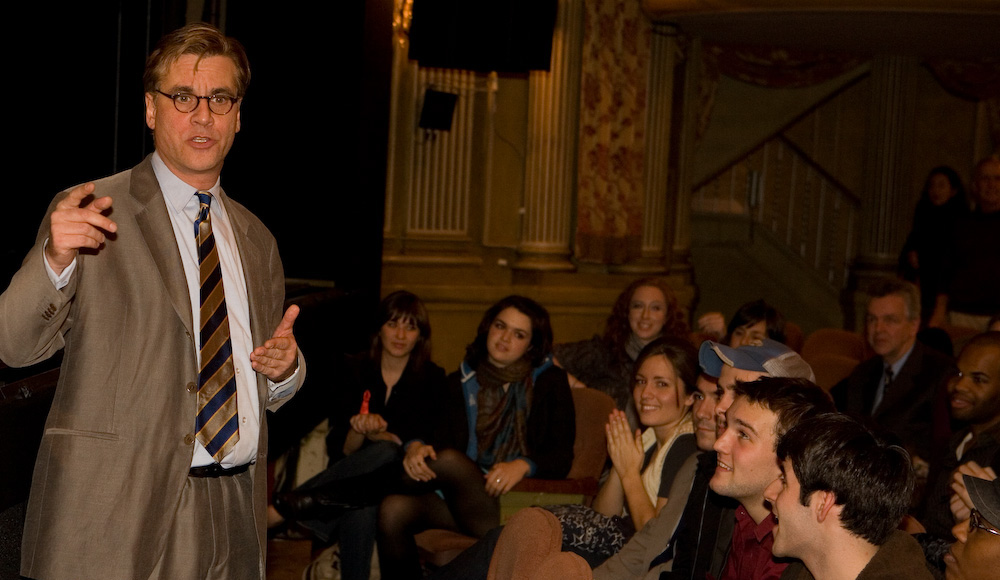
- Aaron Sorkin discussing The Farnsworth Invention with an audience at the Music Box Theatre on November 8, 2007
- Original language: English
- Written by: Aaron Sorkin

The Farnsworth Invention is a stage play by Aaron Sorkin adapted from an unproduced screenplay about Philo Farnsworth's first fully functional and completely all-electronic television system and David Sarnoff, the RCA president who stole the design.

== Plot ==
In 1921, 14-year-old genius Philo Farnsworth moves with his family from Indian Creek, Utah to Rigby, Idaho to live on a potato farm owned by Farnsworth's uncle. While plowing a field, he has an idea for a way to transmit images electronically over the air, which he explains to his ninth grade basic science teacher.

At 10 years old, David Sarnoff and his family emigrate from Russia to the Lower East Side of Manhattan. He works for the Commercial Cable Company as a wireless operator before being fired for not working on Jewish holidays. He then gets a job at American Marconi, which is later sold to General Electric and transformed into the Radio Corporation of America (RCA). Sarnoff becomes a commercial manager tasked with finding new uses for radio. The technology is mainly used at the time for point-to-point communication, but he sees the potential for one person to communicate with many listeners, all using RCA receivers.

Farnsworth drops out of university and goes to George Everson and Leslie Gorrell at the local community chest to seek funding to build a prototype television. They arrange a meeting with William Crocker, president of a national bank, in San Francisco. Farnsworth explains his concept to Crocker and his deputies. He tells them that a patent application was filed four years ago by Vladimir K. Zworykin for an electronic television, but it wasn't granted because it didn't work. Crocker agrees to give Farnsworth $10,000 with a deadline of six months to successfully transmit a moving image.

Farnsworth marries Elma "Pem" Gardner, moves to San Francisco, and opens up his laboratory with his sister Agnes, Pem's brother Cliff, and a student from Caltech. He even recruits a scientist from the lab next door. After six months of work, Farnsworth and the lab team successfully transmit an image.

After the first sporting event (a boxing match) is broadcast, radio increases in popularity. Sarnoff continues to resent the ubiquity of advertisements in radio, believing that broadcasters have a responsibility to deliver tasteful culture and expert opinion to the masses. He proposes that RCA start its own broadcasting company: the National Broadcasting Company, or NBC.

Sarnoff is named president of RCA. He buys AT&T's radio stations along with the patent rights to the Audion tube and FM radio, crucial technologies for broadcasting. NBC takes off, and RCA stock balloons. Sarnoff hears word that a young man in San Francisco has produced an electronic television signal, though it is weak. Sarnoff, not willing to buy the patent and admit that someone outside his company invented television, quadruples RCA's budget for television research and gives Zworykin (now an RCA employee) more staff, aiming to get a clear picture before Farnsworth, revisit the 1923 patent application, and seek priority of invention.

In 1929, the stock market crashes and RCA's stock falls dramatically in a single day. Additionally, RCA's patent pool arrangement with AT&T and Westinghouse is found to be an illegal monopoly, and as part of the settlement, NBC must allow station owners to set their own rules about on-air advertising.

Crocker, Everson, and Gorrell are losing faith (and money) in Farnsworth and his company. Farnsworth struggles with "the light problem"—the television signal requires an impractical amount of light to get a good picture. Farnsworth meets Zworykin at a speakeasy. The two of them turn out to be familiar with each other's work, and Farnsworth invites him to his lab to see his progress. Unbeknownst to Farnsworth, he is there spying for RCA.

Sarnoff is at the opening of Radio City Music Hall when he receives word that Zworykin has gotten a clear picture. His wife Lizette, noting the timing of the breakthrough, accuses him trying to stealing Farnsworth's invention.

Cocker and a lawyer he hired inform Farnsworth of Zworykin's breakthrough and tell him that they are filing a patent interference suit and seeking priority of invention. Farnsworth reasons that the missing link Zworykin needed was the pyrex-sealed tube created by Pem's brother Cliff in his lab.

A judge awards priority of invention to Zworykin and RCA. Sarnoff and Farnsworth meet for the first time after the decision, and discuss who could really be said to have invented television. Sarnoff argues that Farnsworth never got the television right, and he gave away the missing piece to the one who did. Farnsworth says that he may have made a mistake but Sarnoff also erred by letting radio be plagued by a financial incentive. Sarnoff tries to get Farnsworth to come work for RCA, but Farnsworth refuses. Sarnoff promises to be a worthy custodian of Farnsworth's invention.

Sarnoff admits to the audience that he made the previous scene up and that he never met Philo Farnsworth. He says Farnsworth was eventually hospitalized in for depression and died poor and unknown. He admits that he feels responsible for destroying his life. The play ends as Sarnoff imagines Farnsworth in a bar watching the Apollo 11 Moon landing on television.

== Screenplay ==
Variety reported in September 2003 that Sorkin was working on a screenplay about Philo Farnsworth.

On April 29, 2004, New Line Cinema announced they had acquired the script for The Farnsworth Invention from Sorkin. Thomas Schlamme was set to direct.

Following its initial press release, New Line did not disclose any additional information about the film. As a result, websites such as The Internet Movie Database (IMDb) incorrectly anticipated a film in 2005.

== Stage play ==
In 2005 it was announced that Sorkin was adapting the screenplay for the stage and the play would debut in the Abbey Theatre in Dublin, Ireland. It was staged at the La Jolla Playhouse from February 20 - March 25, 2007 as "a page-to-stage production" with Jimmi Simpson (Zodiac) playing Farnsworth and Stephen Lang (Gods and Generals) as Sarnoff. Award-winning composer Andrew Lippa penned 45 minutes of music to underscore the drama.

It was scheduled to open on Broadway on November 14, 2007, but this was delayed due to the 2007 Broadway stagehand strike. It opened at the Music Box Theatre on December 3, 2007, with Hank Azaria in the Sarnoff role due to Lang's commitment to James Cameron's 2009 film Avatar. The show closed on March 2, 2008. Simpson was honored with a Theatre World Award for his performance.

An Australian production directed by Louise Fischer officially opened on July 13, 2011, at the New Theatre in Newtown.

== Historical accuracy ==
The play is not historically accurate and is an intentional alteration of the story. It shows Farnsworth as being defeated legally by Sarnoff, and then spending his life in obscurity. In reality, Farnsworth won the lawsuit, later received a $1 million payment from RCA for the purchase of his TV patents, and went on to have an illustrious career in technological research. There is a statue of Farnsworth in Statuary Hall in the U.S. Capitol.

This issue was later addressed on a Facebook question where Sorkin wrote:

There were many lawsuits, appeals and counter-suits that covered years. Farnsworth won some of them and lost some of them. The final result—certainly in the context of the play I'd written—was a loss. Farnsworth died, as Sarnoff says at the end, "drunk, broke and in obscurity" and whether or not it was the result of corporate espionage or theft was the subject of the play. That's a long of way of saying I conflated many lawsuits into one.
—Aaron Sorkin

== Critical reception ==
In The New York Times, Ben Brantley panned the play with faint praise:

The show certainly deserves high marks for all those traits that exacting schoolteachers hold dear: conciseness, legibility, correct use of topic sentences, evidence in defense of two sides of an argument and colorful examples to support the main thesis .... And yet you’re likely to leave “The Farnsworth Invention” feeling that you have just watched an animated Wikipedia entry, fleshed out with the sort of anecdotal scenes that figure in “re-enactments” on E! channel documentaries and true-crime shows.

In the New York Post, Clive Barnes awarded it 2½ out of 4 stars and stated, "Sorkin's take on the Farnsworth/Sarnoff standoff would be better suited to a screen, either big or small. Even now, while crackling with crisp dialogue, The Farnsworth Invention often has the air of a clumsy stage adaptation of, say, Citizen Kane."

Joe Dziemianowicz of the New York Daily News described it as "disappointing and ho-hum" and "seldom deeply involving . . . Scenes play out like brief vignettes from a History Channel biopic . . . without stirring emotions."

In Newsday, Linda Winer called it "vintage Sorkin and crackling prime-time theater . . . breezy and shrewd, smart-alecky and idealistic."

In Variety, David Rooney said, "The plot-heavy drama is light on fully fleshed-out characters or subtext, making it likely to play more satisfyingly when it inevitably reverts to being a film or cable project . . . [it] never fully moves beyond its stream of over-explained factoids."

In the Chicago Sun-Times, Hedy Weiss described it as "a firecracker of a play in a fittingly snap, crackle and pop production under the direction of Des McAnuff, the drama has among its many virtues the ability to make you think at the same time that it breaks your heart."

Chris Jones of the Chicago Tribune called it "slick yet deeply conflicted" and "restless" and added, "this is one of those Boomer-friendly, media-savvy, self-aware pieces of effective theater that feel like they owe a lot to TV writing and our celebrity-obsessed culture . . . this is a jumpy piece of writing. It feels like the writer is worried the audience might change the channel. That's not entirely a bad thing. As fans of Sorkin's TV shows know well, the internal psyche of Sorkin is a very stimulating place in which to dwell for a couple of hours. His characters are uncommonly articulate and witty—albeit without much differentiation. He has mastered all the dramatic rules so well, he can titillate you by deconstructing and then reassembling them. And in this case he certainly knows how to make a dry scientific quest into a provocative piece of theater."
