= The Politician (book) =

Book by Andrew Young

- Author: Andrew Young
- Language: English
- Subject: John Edwards
- Genre: Non-fiction
- Publisher: St. Martin's Press
- Publication date: 2010
- Publication place: United States
- ISBN: 9780312640651

The Politician: An Insider's Account of John Edwards's Pursuit of the Presidency and the Scandal That Brought Him Down is a 2010 tell-all book by Andrew Young chronicling over a decade working behind the scenes with former North Carolina senator and presidential candidate John Edwards. The book reveals the extramarital affair Edwards had with Rielle Hunter while his wife was fighting cancer. The book also highlights the subsequent cover up of Edwards' affair and the child it produced. The book also details Edwards' asking Young to go into hiding with Hunter, in part because of his wife's health. Young goes in depth detailing Edwards' obsession with campaign donations, his fixating on his hair, his loathing of "fat rednecks" at state fairs, and the lengths he went to hide the affair. Edwards, according to Young, went as far as to ask him to claim paternity of the child. Young said he asked him to steal a diaper for a paternity test, and find a doctor to fake the results of a paternity test.
