= List of Hollywood strikes =

This list of Hollywood strikes names the industrial strikes organized by Hollywood trade unions such as SAG-AFTRA (formerly the Screen Actors Guild [SAG] and the American Federation of Television and Radio Artists [AFTRA]), the Writers Guild of America (WGA), and the Directors Guild of America (DGA). Demands for better compensation, especially residuals, have been a major goal of the strikes.

== List ==
Year	Strike	Duration
2026	2026 Writers Guild Staff Union Strike	80 days
2024–25	2024–2025 SAG-AFTRA video game voice actor strike	348 days (Note: Strike officially declared over on July 9, 2025. However, strike activity was suspended on June 11, 2025, two days after tentative deal was reached. In spite of this, the ability for video game voice actors to return to work at this point in time was only regarded as being under the guise of a "strike suspension," with the strike still being regarded as officially over as a result of the later ratification of the new labor deal.)
2023	2023 SAG-AFTRA strike	118 days (the longest general strike in the guild's history)
2023	2023 Writers Guild of America strike	148 days
2016–17	2016–2017 SAG-AFTRA video game voice actor strike	340 days
2007-08	2007–08 Writers Guild of America strike	99 days
2000	2000 Commercial Actors strike	182 days
1988	1988 Commercial Actors Strike	25 days
1988	1988 Writers Guild of America strike	154 days (the longest strike in the guild's history)
1987	1987 Directors Strike	19 hours and 41 minutes (the shortest of all Hollywood strikes)
1986	1986 Actors Strike	1 day
1985	1985 Writers Strike	14 days
1982	1982 animators' strike	72 days
1981	1981 Writers Guild of America strike	92 days
1980	1980 actors strike	95 days
1978-79	1978-79 SAG and AFTRA Commercials Strike	50 days
1973	1973 WGA Screenwriters Strike	111 days
1972	1972 Composers and Lyricists Guild of America Strike	60 days
1967	1967 AFTRA Strike	12 days
1960	1960 Writers Guild of America strike	148 days (Film) 156 days (TV)
1960	1960 Actors Strike	42 days
1952	1952 Actors Strike	79 days
1945	Set decorators Hollywood Black Friday strike	231 days
1942-1944	1942–1944 musicians' strike	834 days (the longest of all Hollywood strikes)
1941	Disney animators' strike	115 days
1936	1936 Hollywood workers strike backed by American Federation of Labor against the use of US Army and Navy involvement in motion picture production	

== See also ==
- List of strikes
- Residual (entertainment industry)
- Timeline of labor issues and events
- 2023 Hollywood labor disputes

== Bibliography ==
- Blanchard, Margaret A. (2013). History of the Mass Media in the United States: An Encyclopedia. New York, NY: Taylor & Francis. ISBN 9781135917425.
- Littleton, Cynthia (2013). TV on Strike: Why Hollywood Went to War Over the Internet. Syracuse, NY: Syracuse University Press. ISBN 9780815610083.
- Handel, Jonathan (2011). Hollywood on Strike!: An Industry at War in the Internet Age. Los Angeles, CA: Hollywood Analytics. ISBN 9781438233857.
