= Writers Guild of America strike =

Writers Guild of America strike may refer to:

- 1960 Writers Guild of America strike
- 1981 Writers Guild of America strike
- 1988 Writers Guild of America strike
- 2007–08 Writers Guild of America strike
- 2023 Writers Guild of America strike
