= 1980 actors strike =

Labor action in United States

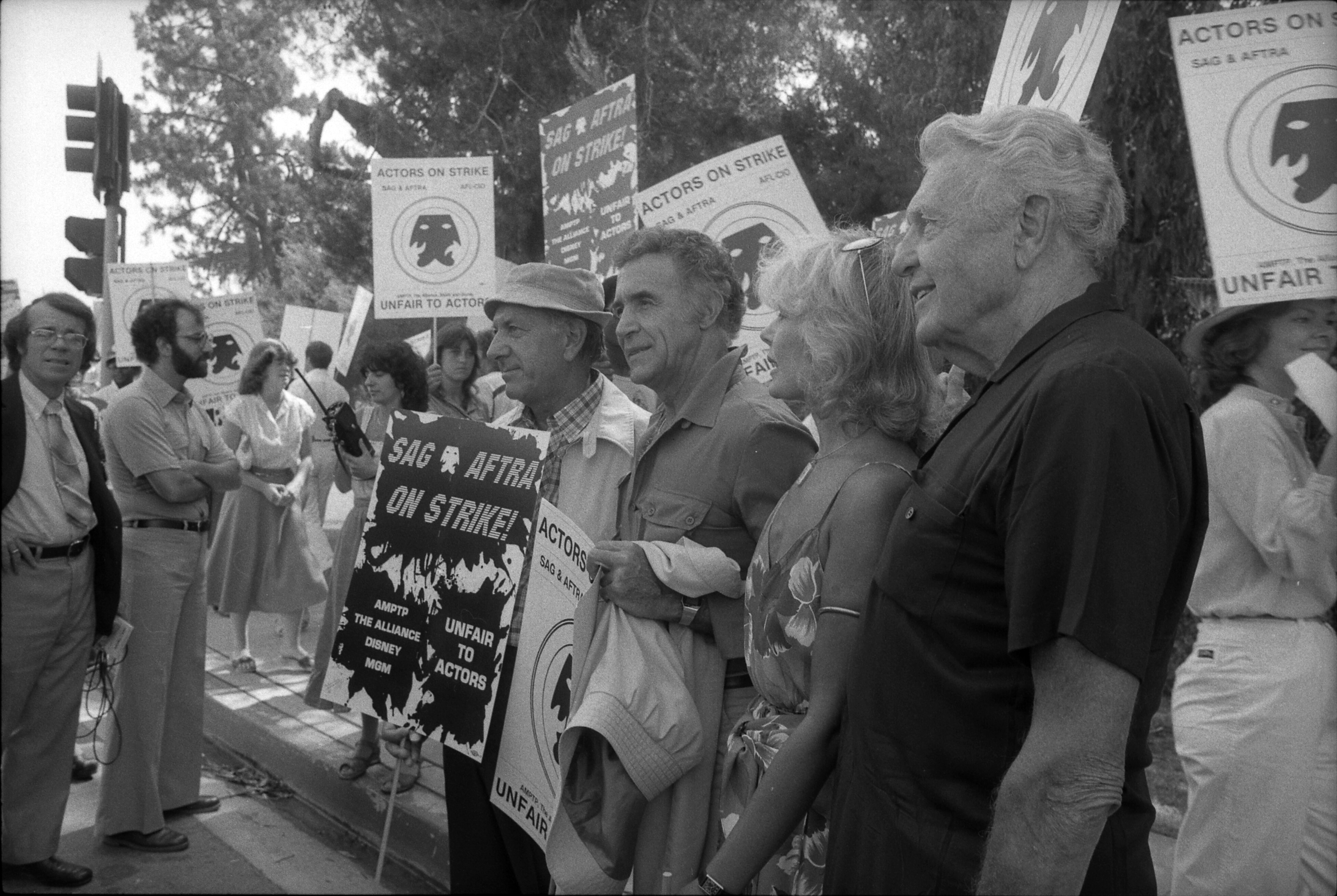
- Jack Klugman, Ricardo Montalbán, Loretta Swit and Ralph Bellamy standing among the picketers
- Date: July 21 – October 23, 1980 (3 months and 2 days)
- Location: United States (primarily Hollywood)
- Caused by: Disagreements over new labor contracts between unions and companies
- Goals: 35 percent wage increases; Guarantee for 12 percent of the gross revenues for home media releases
- Methods: Boycott; Picketing; Strike action; Walkout
- Result: Unions and companies ratify new contract: 32.5 percent wage increases; Guarantee for 4.5 percent of the gross revenues for home media releases; 30 percent increase in residuals, among other improvements to employee benefits

Parties
American Federation of Musicians; American Federation of Television and Radio Artists; Screen Actors Guild	Association of Motion Picture and Television Producers

The 1980 actors strike was a labor strike held in July–October 1980 by the Screen Actors Guild (SAG) and the American Federation of Television and Radio Artists (AFTRA), two labor unions representing actors in the American film industry. The strike was caused by a breakdown in labor contract negotiations between the two unions (who were negotiating for a joint contract) and representatives of film studios, television networks, and other independent producers. The primary point of contention regarded residuals from home media, such as videocassettes and pay television. Specifically, the union was seeking a form of profit sharing wherein they would receive a percentage of the revenue made from home media releases. Additionally, the unions wanted a 35 percent salary increase across the board for their members. By mid-July, the union and industry representatives were at an impasse, and the strike started on July 21. Several days later, the American Federation of Musicians (AFM, a labor union representing musicians in the film industry) also went on strike for similar reasons.

Altogether, roughly 67,000 workers from SAG and AFTRA struck.

Striking continued for several months, during which time almost all production on film and television was halted. Additionally, the 32nd Primetime Emmy Awards were boycotted by the unions, with only one Emmy winner attending the event: actor Powers Boothe. By mid-September, an agreement had been made between the union and companies that constituted a compromise, with the unions receiving pay increases and profit sharing from home media releases, but at a lower share than they had originally pushed for. However, the contracts also provided for additional benefits in the members healthcare, pension, and overtime plans, among other guarantees. As a result, union members voted to accept the terms of the agreement by mid-October. The AFM continued to strike for several more months, agreeing to a new contract in January of the following year.

The strike was the actor's longest for film and television until 2023, where the strike occurred alongside the Writers Guild of America's.

== Background ==
Starting on May 19, 1980, the Screen Actors Guild (SAG) and the American Federation of Television and Radio Artists (AFTRA), two major labor unions representing actors in Hollywood, had been negotiating with representatives of film producers, film studios, and television networks (many represented by the Association of Motion Picture and Television Producers (AMPTP) and including, among others, the Big Three television networks, Paramount Pictures, Twentieth Century-Fox Film Corporation, and Universal Pictures) over new labor contracts that would cover the next three years. According to both unions, the major point of contention regarded the burgeoning home video market. Industry representatives contended that home media was at the time not yet a major business, with only 2 percent of all American households owning a VCR at that time. However, the unions disagreed and were seeking changes regarding payment for these releases. In particular, the unions wanted a profit sharing plan for home video releases, including pay television, videocassettes, and videodiscs. At the time, the current practices were to pay actors a one-time salary for participation in a project with no future profit sharing for home video releases. However, SAG proposed a profit sharing model wherein actors would receive 12 percent of the gross revenues for projects made explicitly for home video. In addition, SAG was pushing for actors to receive payments for films that had been sold to television networks or cable channels that have been shown more than 12 times in a month. While these covered SAG's concerns with home video, the union was also seeking a 35 percent increase in all salary categories, while both unions were also pushing for a 40 percent increase in their minimum wages over the next three years, which would have seen union members' daily rates increase from $225 to $315 and weekly rates increase from $785 to $1,100. These contract negotiations did not affect the production of game shows, soap operas, or news and educational programs, which were covered under different contracts. As negotiations continued, the unions prepared for strike action, with The New York Times reporting on July 10 that SAG had set a strike deadline for July 21. With no deal reached by that time, the strike began on July 21, with a walkout at 2 a.m. At the time of the strike's beginning, American Federation of Television and Radio Artists (AFTRA) had also been negotiating a new contract with the recording industry concerning similar issues over home media. While that contract had expired on March 31, American Federation of Television and Radio Artists (AFTRA) delayed agreeing to new terms until their dispute with the film and television industry had also been settled. This strike would be the second collaborative strike between Screen Actors Guild (SAG) and American Federation of Television and Radio Artists (AFTRA) following a strike in 1978. The 1980 Actors Strike was not an isolated event but occurred within a broader context of labor unrest in Hollywood. During this period, guilds representing writers, directors, and actors were increasingly vocal about their dissatisfaction with compensation models, particularly as new technologies like cable television and home video began reshaping the entertainment landscape. This strike marked a critical moment for the Screen Actors Guild (SAG) and the American Federation of Television and Radio Artists (AFTRA), as both organizations grappled with the challenges of adapting their contracts to reflect the realities of modern media distribution. These tensions reflected a continuation of disputes dating back to earlier technological shifts, such as the rise of network television, which had also prompted calls for equitable profit-sharing arrangements.

== Course of the strike ==
In the first week of striking, The Christian Science Monitor reported that the action had "shut down most movie and TV productions across the United States". Of note, three movies that were being filmed in New York City at the time were put on hold after movie stars Candice Bergen, Jacqueline Bisset, Liza Minnelli, Dudley Moore, and Burt Reynolds did not show up on set. 9 to 5 and The Janitor, both Twentieth Century Fox films, were among the films that were under production and affected by the strike. Spokespeople for several television networks stated that, while filming for some shows scheduled for the 1980–81 United States network television schedule had already been completed, a prolonged strike could affect scheduling, either forcing a delay of the start of the season or requiring the showing of reruns until production could continue. Meanwhile, spokespeople for the unions stated that the strike could be a long one. By August 2, Billboard was reporting that negotiations between the unions and entertainment industry were still ongoing. At midnight on July 31, the American Federation of Musicians (AFM), which had similarly been negotiating with the film industry over pay issues regarding music used in home media releases, joined SAG and AFTRA in striking against the AMPTP, with AFM President Victor Fuentealba saying, "There is a long-standing, obvious and illogical inequity whereby musicians receive no reuse payment when TV films on which they have worked are rerun on TV, while producers make such payments to actors, directors and writers". This came after negotiations deteriorated just before the AFM's contract with the AMPTP expired on July 31.

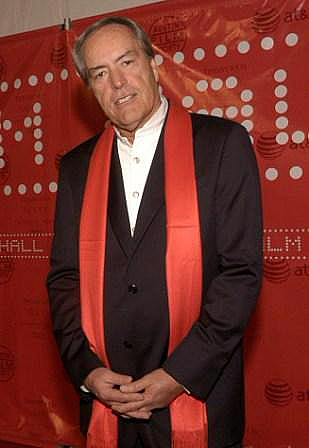
Powers Boothe was the only nominated actor to attend the 1980 Primetime Emmy Awards

By early August, Billboard reported that the strike was costing the American film and television industry approximately $40 million per week. Around that same time, on August 4, SAG entered into mediation hosted by the Federal Mediation and Conciliation Service at the Wilshire Federal Building. While SAG was still adamant about the 35 percent across the board wage increases and payments for films shown on television over 12 times a month, reporters contended that SAG was possibly willing to settle for less than the original 12 percent of gross revenues for home video projects. However, a representative for SAG claimed that the union and industry were "still miles apart" and that an end to the strike could take a long time to reach. However, the mediation was called off after one day, with neither side reaching an agreement. During the discussion, SAG representatives asked to shelf discussions of the home media payment issue and work out the other issues present (such as the 35 percent wage increase), but the entertainment representatives did not want to move forward with any further discussions until the home media issue was resolved. The business representatives countered SAG's offer with an offer of 3 percent of the gross revenues of a feature that has played on TV for at least 15 days over the span of two years, with the business representatives arguing that this would allow the payments to emanate from the feature's profits and not its gross. Talks resumed later that month on August 21. On August 27, SAG and AFTRA members from the unions' New York City branches held a rally outside of the Gulf & Western Building in support of the strikers. Negotiations were recessed on September 4.

On September 7, the 32nd Primetime Emmy Awards were boycotted, with the only nominated actor to come to the event being Powers Boothe, where he won an Emmy for his role in Guyana Tragedy: The Story of Jim Jones. During his acceptance speech, he referenced the union boycott of the event, saying, "This is either the most courageous moment of my career or the stupidest". During the ceremony, host Steve Allen made reference to the strike with a joke about former actor and then-presidential candidate Ronald Reagan, saying, "Who would have ever thought that all of us would live to see the day when Ronald Reagan would be the only actor working?". The Los Angeles Herald Examiner called the event, "The Night the Stars Didn't Shine".

During this time, AFM had several hundred members picket various film studios throughout Hollywood, with an AFM representative stating that the producers were looking to resolve the dispute with SAG and AFTRA before negotiating with them. By late September, AFM reported that some people were producing music for American film and television overseas in violation of orders from the union, with the people found responsible facing reprimanding from AFM. The president of AFM's Los Angeles local union later wrote to several government officials (including U.S. President Jimmy Carter, California Governor Jerry Brown, Los Angeles Mayor Tom Bradley, and several members of both U.S. Congress and the Los Angeles City Council) urging them to intervene and stop what he called "anti-American action" using "foreign strikebreakers".

On September 16, SAG and AFTRA held a benefit rally at the Hollywood Bowl. The event, called "An Evening of Stars", raised $300,000 for SAG's strike fund. The next day, following negotiations, the SAG and AFTRA had reached a deal with the studios and producers regarding the home media issue. As part of the agreement, actors would receive 4.5 percent of a film's gross after it has played for ten days over a one-year period. For home release, this same percentage gross would be received after 100,000 units had been achieved. In addition to the percentage of the gross, actors were entitled to pension, welfare, and health benefits. However, despite the progress, the strike still continued due to disagreements concerning the 35 percent salary increase that the unions had been pushing for. By September 25, following an 18.5-hour-long bargaining session, the unions and companies came to a tentative agreement that addressed the remaining issues. As part of the terms, members would receive a 32.5 percent wage increase across the board. Additionally, actors received an increase of over 30 percent in residuals, improvements to pension, welfare, and health benefits (including dental coverage), improved overtime benefits, and guarantees for improved working conditions and nondiscriminatory practices in hiring and casting. Following the agreement, both unions submitted the terms of the agreement for a vote by its members. However, in addition, the tentative three-year agreement also included a no-strike clause. Mail-in ballots were distributed to SAG members, while AFTRA members began to vote in chapter meetings, with a SAG representative stating that they hoped to have the results tallied by October 21. By October 8, the Los Angeles AFTRA chapter had failed to pass the agreement with a 228–220 vote, while the San Francisco chapter voted 51–7 in favor. Throughout October, a substantial minority of union members opposed the agreement, arguing that a longer strike could lead to a better deal. However, despite the opposition, the agreement was ratified with 83.4 percent of the vote.

On October 1, the AFM and AMPTP met for their first round of negotiations since the beginning of their strike action on July 31. However, the negotiations ended later that day with no deal being reached. By the first week of October, many actors were returning to rehearsal halls in preparation for an end to the strike. However, despite this, a representative for AFM stated that the actors, as well as members of other unions (such as the Teamsters), had not crossed their picket lines out of solidarity with the strikers. By October 23, the actors had ratified their new contracts. On October 27, AFM and the AMPTP resumed negotiations without a federal mediator, unlike during the October 1 meeting. These negotiations ended on October 29, after AMPTP representatives introduced the topic of pay changes for pay television and home videos. AFM representatives contended that the cause of the strike was over payment for reuse in commercial television and that the AMPTP representatives were acting unethically in introducing what they called a "brand new issue" during negotiations. Negotiations resumed in early December. On January 14, 1981, following a renewed round of negotiations, the AFM and AMPTP came to a tentative agreement that saw an immediate end to the strike, with the agreement submitted to AFM members for ratification. The mail-in voting process was expected to take approximately four weeks. The agreement was seen as a failure for AFM, as it failed to include agreements concerning the issue of residuals that had precipitated the strike. One of the primary motivations behind the 1980 actor's strike was the dispute over residual payments for the newly emerging cable television and home video markets. These formats were gaining popularity, but existing contracts did not include provisions for actors to receive a share of revenues from these media. The Screen Actors Guild (SAG) argued that actors deserved compensation for the repeated use of their work in these growing markets. This dispute over residuals became a significant point of contention, ultimately fueling the strike.

== Strike outcomes ==
The 1980 SAG-AFTRA (SAG and AFTRA were still separate entities in 1980 (the unions formally merged in 2012) but they frequently joined forces in negotiations on the most lucrative film and TV contracts. At the time of the 1980 strike, Screen Actors Guild represented about 45,000 performers; American Federation of Television and Radio Artists had about 12,000 members) strike not only centered on residuals and compensation, but also revealed significant internal dynamics within the union. The lengthy strike spurred debate among union members over the effectiveness of leadership and negotiation strategies, with some advocating a tougher stance against the studios. It highlights that the union's leadership faced the challenge of balancing diverse member perspectives in a rapidly changing media landscape. These internal discussions underscored the complexities within SAG-AFTRA, as it sought to unify its membership while confronting technological shifts that threatened traditional compensation models. This strike was thus a defining moment, shaping SAG-AFTRA's identity and approach in future negotiations. The strike led to the creation of new residuals structures specifically for cable television and home video, ensuring actors received a share of revenues from these formats. This breakthrough laid the foundation for future negotiations over residuals in home media, marking a significant shift in how emerging technologies impacted compensation. This was the first time contracts addressed new media formats, setting an industry precedent for residuals tied to technological advancements.

== Aftermath ==
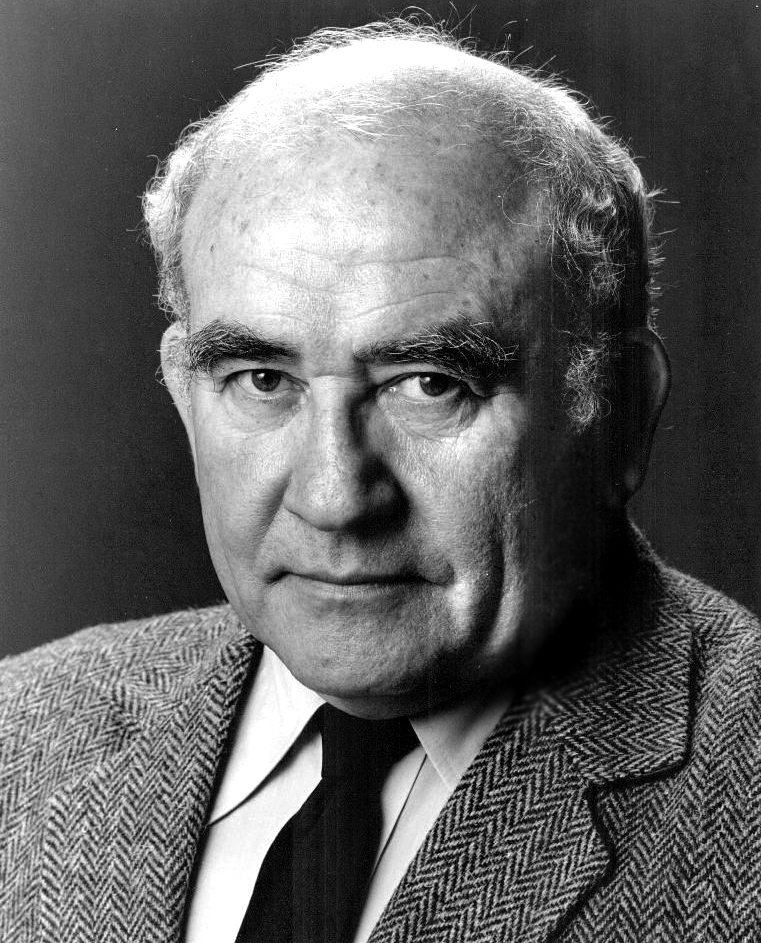
Ed Asner, who had been a spokesman for the actors during the strike, was later elected president of SAG.

Due to the length of the strike, most shows entering into first-run syndication were postponed from premiering until mid-October 1980. Cosmos: A Personal Voyage, an educational program created by scientist Carl Sagan, premiered during the strike, and the lack of new programs and competition may have helped it to be a success in the ratings. During the strike, actor Ed Asner (a SAG member who was at the time famous for his role as the titular character on the TV series Lou Grant) served as a spokesperson for the strikers by participating in news conferences and other events. Following the strike settlement, Asner became something of a leader for SAG members who were unhappy with the terms of the agreement, and on November 3, 1981, he was elected as president of SAG.

One byproduct of the actors strike and the next year's writers strike was that for two consecutive years, British movies won the Academy Award for Best Picture (Chariots of Fire in 1981, Gandhi in 1982).

=== Merger of SAG and AFTRA ===
According to historian Kate Fortmueller, the strike "underscored the many shared interests between SAG and AFTRA and demonstrated the effectiveness of joint bargaining". Following the strike, the two unions entered into a "Phase 1" regarding a merger, whereby the two would jointly negotiate contracts. This phase lasted until 2008, when a disagreement during negotiations caused a rift between the two groups. However, by 2012, these issues would be more or less resolved and the two unions merged that year, creating SAG-AFTRA. During the 1980s, there were also discussions on SAG absorbing the Screen Extras Guild, another labor union representing actors. However, this proposed merger never came to fruition.

=== Later strike action ===
The strike would be the last labor dispute to directly pit film and television actors against studios until the 2023 SAG-AFTRA strike, though the unions were indirectly involved in other strike actions, including the 2000 commercial actors strike and the 2016–2017 video game voice actor strike. Discussing the 2023 strike, film critic and political commentator Ben Mankiewicz drew comparisons to the 1980 strike, saying that in both cases, the causes of the strikes concerned residuals from new technologies (videocassette and home media in 1980 and streaming services in 2023).

== Sources ==
- Daniel, Douglass K. (1996). Lou Grant: The Making of TV's Top Newspaper Drama. Foreword by Edward Asner. Syracuse, New York: Syracuse University Press. ISBN 978-0-8156-0363-4.
- Fortmueller, Kate (2020). "SAG-AFTRA". In Merskin, Debra L. (ed.). The SAGE International Encyclopedia of Mass Media and Society. Thousand Oaks, California: SAGE Publications. pp. 1513–1515. ISBN 978-1-4833-7552-6.
- Fortmueller, Kate (2021). Below the Stars: How the Labor of Working Actors and Extras Shapes Media Production. Austin, Texas: University of Texas Press. ISBN 978-1-4773-2307-6.
- Kassel, Michael B. (1993). America's Favorite Radio Station: WKRP in Cincinnati. Bowling Green, Ohio: Bowling Green State University Popular Press. ISBN 978-0-87972-584-6.
- Prindle, David F. (1988). The Politics of Glamour: Ideology and Democracy in the Screen Actors Guild. Madison, Wisconsin: University of Wisconsin Press. ISBN 978-0-299-11813-6.
- Sorensen, Karen Schroeder (2017). Cosmos and the Rhetoric of Popular Science. Lanham, Maryland: Lexington Books. ISBN 978-1-4985-0760-8.
- Taylor, Timothy D. (2016). Music and Capitalism: A History of the Present. Chicago: University of Chicago Press. ISBN 978-0-226-31197-5.
