= 2023 SAG-AFTRA strike =

American media labor dispute

- Part of 2023 Hollywood labor disputes
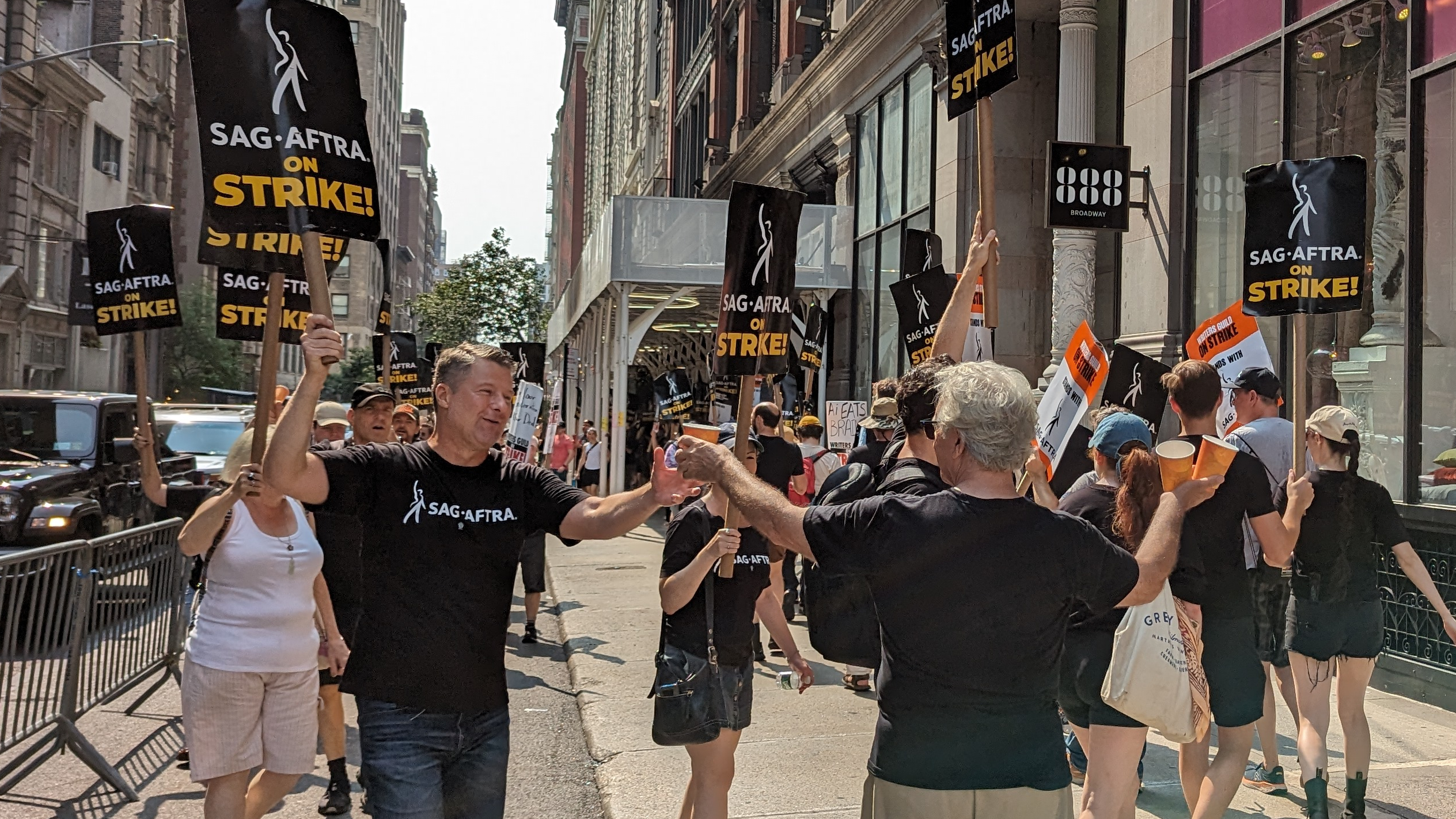
- SAG-AFTRA members picketing in New York City in July 2023
- Date: July 14 – November 9, 2023 (3 months and 26 days)
- Location: United States; Primarily Los Angeles and New York City (Note: As SAG-AFTRA members live and work across the country, "strike support events" have been called in other filming locations, including to date Atlanta, Honolulu, and San Francisco.)
- Caused by: Lack of agreement on a new contract between SAG-AFTRA and the AMPTP; Disagreement over streaming residuals and regulation of self-tape auditions; Studio usage of artificial intelligence (AI) to scan actors' faces to generate performances digitally
- Goals: Ratification of a labor contract; Streaming service residual formula; Greater regulation of self-tape auditions; Preventing AI from replacing actors on set
- Methods: Strike action; Work stoppage; Picketing; Unfair labor practice charges
- Result: Tentative agreement reached on November 8, 2023; Contract ratified on December 5, 2023

Parties
Screen Actors Guild-American Federation of Television and Radio Artists	Alliance of Motion Picture and Television Producers

From July 14 to November 9, 2023, the American actors' union Screen Actors Guild–American Federation of Television and Radio Artists (SAG-AFTRA) went on strike over a labor dispute with the Alliance of Motion Picture and Television Producers (AMPTP). It was the longest actors' strike against the film and TV studios in Hollywood history.

Along with the 2023 Writers Guild of America strike (which ended on September 27, 2023), the SAG-AFTRA strike was part of a series of broader Hollywood labor disputes. Both the 2023 SAG-AFTRA and WGA strikes contributed to the biggest interruption to the American film and television industries since the impact of the COVID-19 pandemic in 2020. In addition to standing in solidarity with the writers, the strike was led by changes in the industry caused by streaming and its effect on residuals, as well as other new technologies such as AI and digital recreation. It marked the first time that actors initiated a labor dispute in the U.S. since the 1980 actors strike and the first time that actors and writers have walked out simultaneously since 1960.

Negotiations between SAG-AFTRA and the AMPTP took place from October 2 to October 11 and resumed on October 24. On November 8, 2023, a tentative deal between the two sides was reached. Striking ended on November 9 at 12:01 a.m. PST. On December 5, the SAG-AFTRA membership officially ratified the contract with over 78% of members voting in favor.

== Background ==
=== Unionization in Hollywood ===
The Screen Actors Guild – American Federation of Television and Radio Artists (SAG-AFTRA) is a labor union that represents approximately 160,000 media professionals and entertainers. The Alliance of Motion Picture and Television Producers (AMPTP) is a trade association that represents film and television studios in collective bargaining negotiations with unions such as SAG-AFTRA, the Directors Guild of America (DGA), and Writers Guild of America, East and Writers Guild of America West, comprising the Writers Guild of America (WGA). SAG-AFTRA was formed by the merger of the Screen Actors Guild (SAG) and the American Federation of Television and Radio Artists (AFTRA) in March 2012, allowing SAG-AFTRA to represent not only actors, but also journalists, talk show hosts, and other broadcast workers. The WGA and the Screen Actors Guild have not simultaneously been on strike since 1960, when actors joined striking writers over residual payments from films sold to television networks. The 1980 actors strike involved the combined efforts of SAG and AFTRA. The largest SAG-AFTRA strike since 1980 occurred in 2000, in which commercial actors went on strike to push for a continuation of the residual system against advertiser backlash, amidst the divisions between SAG and AFTRA.

During the last decade and the rise of streaming, writers and actors have been frustrated over studio policy regarding residuals from streaming services; the decline of network television has led to a stronger reliance on other residuals. The 2007–08 WGA strike was motivated in large part by studio executives insisting that writers should receive no residuals from streaming services. The 2007–08 strike cost the city of Los Angeles an estimated US$1.5 billion, according to NPR. As with striking WGA writers, actors have expressed concerns about the use of artificial intelligence, noting that it could be used to replicate their likeness without compensation.

=== Pre-strike activity ===
Weeks after the Writers Guild of America went on strike in May 2023, SAG-AFTRA's national board of directors unanimously agreed to pursue a strike authorization vote ahead of a renewed contract; SAG-AFTRA approved a new contract in 2020 that would expire on June 30, 2023. The union stated that it did not intend to strike but that it sought to give its negotiators "maximum bargaining leverage" ahead of negotiations on June 7, 2023. SAG-AFTRA cited several issues in negotiations, including "economic fairness, residuals, regulating the use of artificial intelligence and alleviating the burdens of the industry-wide shift to self-taping", and told its members that the Alliance of Motion Picture and Television Producers would cut actors' salaries to "pad corporate profits". In a video released on May 30, 2023, SAG-AFTRA members Julia Louis-Dreyfus, Jean Smart, and Kumail Nanjiani appealed to members to vote to strike but reserved that a vote for strike authorization was solely a bargaining tool, not a vote to order an immediate strike.

On June 5, 2023, SAG-AFTRA approved the strike authorization by a 98% margin, according to the union. High-profile members—including Quinta Brunson, Jennifer Lawrence, and Rami Malek—signaled their willingness to strike ahead of the deadline to achieve a "transformative deal", despite "extremely productive" negotiations. SAG-AFTRA agreed to extend negotiations to midnight on July 13, 2023, in an attempt to avoid a strike, but negotiations broke down in July 2023. SAG-AFTRA surveyed members on a strike on July 5, 2023, and began preparing picket signs two days later.

The AMPTP agreed to a "last-minute request" for mediation from the Federal Mediation and Conciliation Service on July 11, 2023; congressional and public affairs director Greg Raelson stated that a federal mediator would be present the following day. In turn, SAG-AFTRA accused the AMPTP of attempting to extend negotiations beyond the deadline and reiterated that it would not continue negotiating after July 12, 2023. A number of high-profile actors, including Lawrence and Malek, then affirmed their support again by signing a letter urging the union to take aggressive measures and stating their willingness to strike. It was later reported by Variety that mediation collapsed after AMPTP President Carol Lombardini insulted negotiators by telling them to "be civilized" and avert a strike, which prompted a walkout by union negotiators. In response to Lombardini's comment, SAG-AFTRA president Fran Drescher reportedly said to AMPTP negotiators "Now you've got two unions on strike" as they left.

On July 12, a statement was made announcing the construction of a Fast & Furious-themed roller coaster; the date of the announcement coincided with the deadline SAG-AFTRA gave before ending negotiations with the AMPTP, and construction began by the strike's start. This added to the construction that began on May 8, shortly after the WGA began protesting on-site, obstructing Lankershim Boulevard along the west end of the park's campus and parking lot and further restricting sidewalk access. The sidewalks in front of Gates 1, 2, 4, and 5 would be scaffolded-off and demolished in this construction. Despite prior advice from the Los Angeles Police Department's Labor Relations Unit to place K-rails from River Road to Universal Hollywood Drive for the safety of protesters and other pedestrians since WGA protests as early as June 6, none were placed by July 18, by which time reports of two protesters being struck by vehicles had been made.

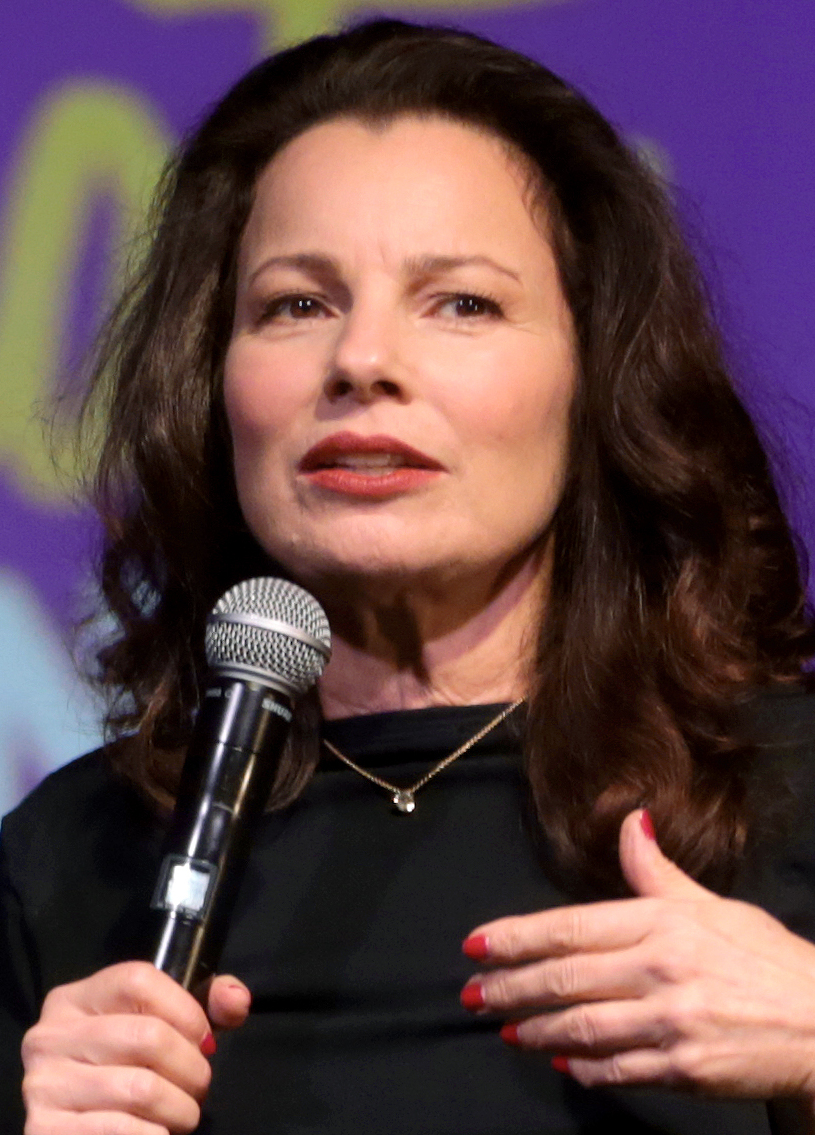
SAG-AFTRA president Fran Drescher announced the strike on July 13, 2023.

On July 13, with no agreement between SAG-AFTRA and the Alliance of Motion Picture and Television Producers (AMPTP), the SAG-AFTRA negotiating committee voted unanimously to recommend a strike to the union's national board. The national board held a vote officially approving the strike. SAG-AFTRA president Fran Drescher announced the strike would begin at midnight on July 14; the cast of Oppenheimer left the film's London premiere ahead of the announcement to walk out. Joined by chief negotiator Duncan Crabtree-Ireland, Drescher asserted that the strike was a reluctant last resort and described the proposed contract as "moving around furniture on the Titanic." In the press conference, Crabtree-Ireland alleged that the AMPTP attempted to include a proposal that allowed studios to, for a one-time fee equivalent to one day's pay, have exclusive and indefinite rights to extras' likenesses, including the use of generative AI to replicate them on screen. Media commentators likened this to the film The Congress (2013) and the Black Mirror sixth series episode "Joan Is Awful" (2023). However, AMPTP denied these claims, stating that their proposal would allow usage of these replicas within the specific film for which they are employed, and that any other uses would require consent and further compensation.

== Timeline ==
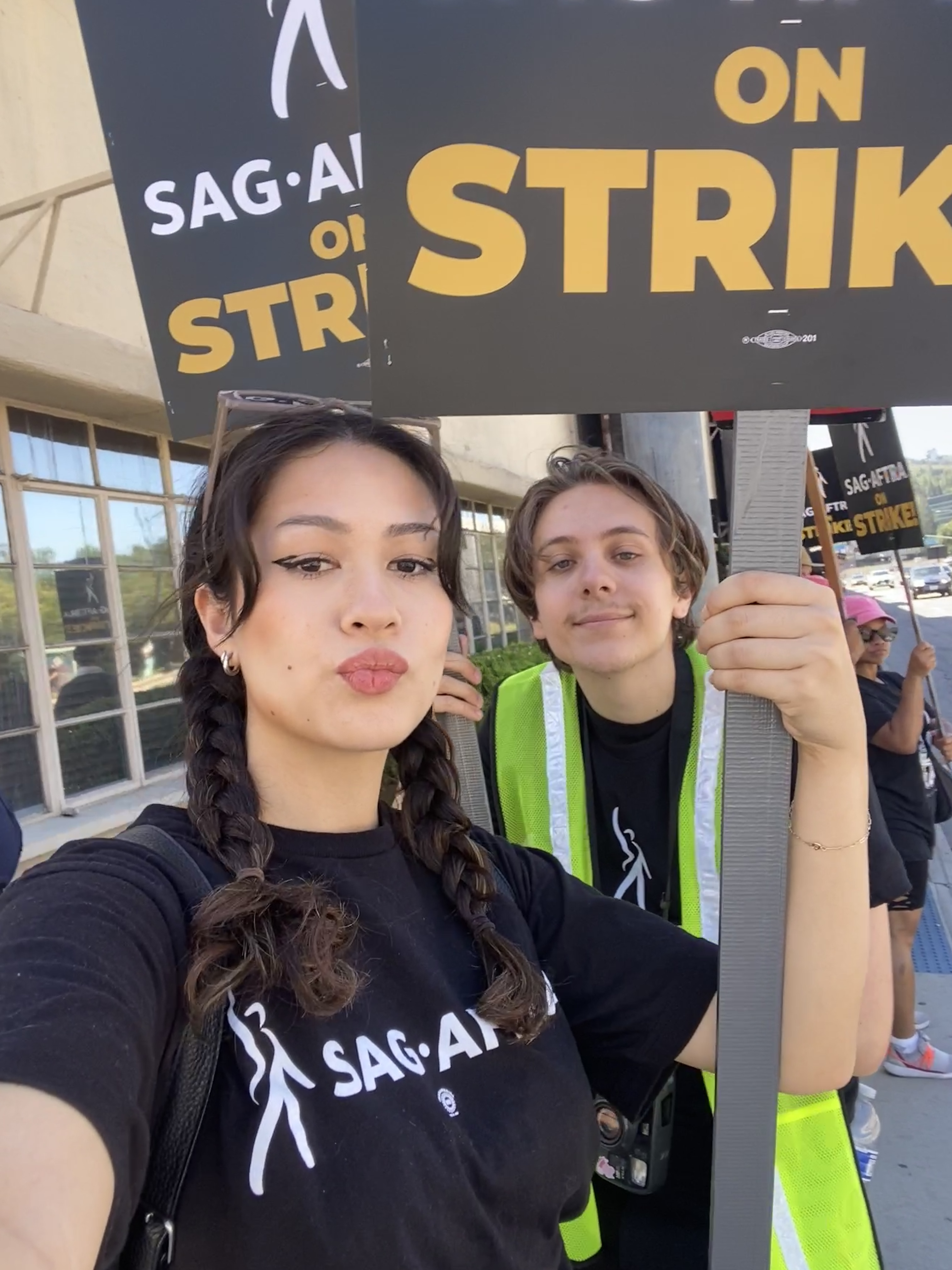
Two SAG-AFTRA members striking outside of Warner Brothers Studios on July 14th, 2023

=== July ===
The strike officially began on July 14. As part of the rules established on July 10, actors could not engage in film or television productions and could not take part in promotional work, such as press junkets, film premieres, and events—including San Diego Comic-Con, which was scheduled for July 20–23. The strike action does not apply to SAG-AFTRA members who work under contracts that are negotiated by the union separately from the AMPTP contract, including broadcast journalists. Work in podcasts, "micro-budget" independent films, and student films was allowed, as was "unscripted" television work such as game shows, reality competition shows, documentaries, and talk shows. Internationally, SAG-AFTRA members were authorized to continue work in the United Kingdom under pre-established Equity collective bargaining agreements, as UK law criminalizes solidarity strikes. The HBO series House of the Dragon thus continued its UK-based filming with SAG-AFTRA actors operating under Equity contracts, prompting backlash among fans of the series.

On July 17, the Ficus trees on Barham Boulevard's sidewalk outside Gate 8 were pruned almost entirely of their leaves. Pine trees on the opposite side of Barham were not touched, nor were a row of pepper trees behind the fence near the production gate. The pruning was described as a vindictive action because the trees had been being used by protesters as shade from the over 90 °F (32 °C) summer temperatures of Southern California. The pruning was also described as illegal, on the grounds that the trees are owned by the city and that Los Angeles' tree ordinances prohibit trimming them between July and September. NBCUniversal issued a statement to Deadline Hollywood denying that the trimming was done out of malice, claiming that they trim the trees outside the park in July annually for safety, and describing it and the obstructive construction hazards as "unintended challenges for demonstrators". NBCUniversal was fined US$250 for violating tree laws and destroying city property.

Also on July 17, SAG-AFTRA released a twelve-page statement outlining the breakdown in negotiations, and terms they found unacceptable, including but not limited to a five-percent salary increase for actors, while the union had asked for eleven percent. The AMPTP released a counter-statement, highlighting that its actions were being "deliberately distort[ed]" and that SAG-AFTRA had chosen to pass over "the most lucrative deal we have ever negotiated... valued at $318 million over the three-year term of the contract."

On July 18, NBCUniversal was accused of conducting business at Universal Studios Hollywood to deter or endanger the protesters and infringe on their rights to protest. In response, SAG-AFTRA and WGA issued a joint grievance to the National Labor Relations Board against NBCUniversal, accusing the company of interfering with their freedom to picket and endangering their members. Writers Guild of America West additionally filed a petition to the AMPTP in response to NBCUniversal's failure to install barriers to protect WGA and SAG-AFTRA protestors from the risk of being forced into traffic. NBCUniversal responded to The Hollywood Reporter in a statement: "We are aware of the WGA and SAG-AFTRA complaints. We strongly believe that the company has fulfilled our legal obligations under the National Labor Relations Act (NLRA) and we will cooperate with respect to any inquiries by the National Labor Relations Board on this issue. While we understand the timing of our multi-year construction project has created challenges for demonstrators, we continue to work with public agencies to increase access. We support the unions' rights to demonstrate safely."

On July 19, 2023, SAG-AFTRA approved more films to be shot during the strike, including Ishana Night Shyamalan's The Watchers, Sam Raimi's Don't Move, and David Lowery's Mother Mary. 56 films then became eligible to shoot under strike rules.

On July 25, 2023, thousands of actors rallied Tuesday morning at Times Square from 9:30 A.M. to noon to voice their concerns about fair treatment and wages. SAG-AFTRA's main contractual negotiator, Duncan Crabtree-Ireland spoke about the struggle that the union is facing with the AMPTP. Many celebrities gave speeches to express their concerns about the future of their union and technological advancements in the industry. In attendance were Lauren Ambrose, Matt Bomer, Christine Baranski, Steve Buscemi, Bobby Cannavale, Tituss Burgess, Liza Colón-Zayas, Bryan Cranston, Jessica Chastain, Gregory Diaz, Jennifer Ehle, Brendan Fraser, Nancy Giles, Danai Gurira, Jill Hennessy, Marin Hinkle, Stephen Lang, Arian Moayed, Christopher Meloni, Chloë Grace Moretz, Wendell Pierce, Michael Shannon, Christian Slater, Corey Stoll, Merritt Wever and Rachel Zegler.

=== August ===
Picketing was called off for one day, August 21, 2023, due to Hurricane Hilary.

=== September ===
After the WGA and AMPTP reached a tentative agreement on September 24, leading to the official end of the WGA strike on September 27, SAG-AFTRA announced that it remained on strike, and called for renewed negotiations with the AMPTP. Later on September 27, SAG-AFTRA and AMPTP made a joint announcement that "SAG-AFTRA and the AMPTP will resume negotiations for a new TV/Theatrical contract on Monday, October 2."

=== October ===
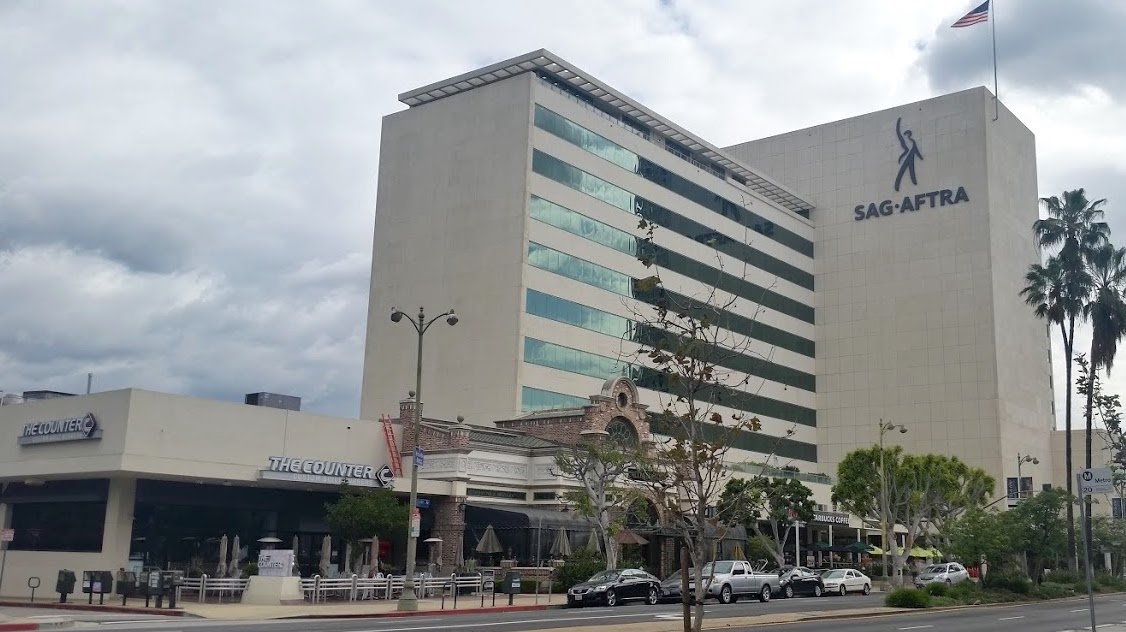
SAG-AFTRA Plaza in Los Angeles, California

On October 2, SAG-AFTRA and the AMPTP met for negotiations, in the first meeting between the two unions since the SAG-AFTRA strike began on July 14. Unlike the WGA's negotiations, SAG-AFTRA's negotiations were held at SAG-AFTRA's headquarters on Wilshire Boulevard rather than the AMPTP's headquarters in Sherman Oaks as, according to Deadline, SAG-AFTRA officials were displeased "with the AMPTP's setup" and wanted a change of scenery. Participants included AMPTP chief Carol Lombardini, Donna Langley (NBCUniversal), David Zaslav (Warner Bros. Discovery), Ted Sarandos (Netflix), Bob Iger (Disney), as well as SAG-AFTRA's Fran Drescher, Duncan Crabtree-Ireland, and Ray Rodriguez. The meeting concluded with an announcement that they would meet again on the 4th. This pattern continued from October 4 to 9, when a joint statement announced a meeting on October 11. However, negotiations broke down on October 11.

Beginning October 12, numerous reasons were given as to why negotiations stopped. Sarandos said that talks broke down because SAG-AFTRA "introduced a levy on subscribers on top of [other] areas" which he said was "a bridge too far." However, SAG-AFTRA accused the AMPTP of using "bully tactics", with Drescher stating that the AMPTP "had given us a proposal package. We worked for like 36 hours on it. We brought it back to them. We walked them through it and they left and then called a few hours later and said, 'We're breaking negotiations.'" Drescher has also said that SAG-AFTRA wanted to continue negotiations. Duncan Crabtree-Ireland (SAG-AFTRA) also responded stating that, "the public statement from the CEOs in their press release from the AMPTP characterized our demands as excessive. But really we don't think they are. The numbers they've been using are wildly overstated."

On October 16, SAG-AFTRA announced that it will schedule negotiations regarding a new video game contract.

On October 19, Deadline Hollywood reported that a Zoom call between Hollywood stars (George Clooney, Scarlett Johansson, Kerry Washington, Tyler Perry, Bradley Cooper, Meryl Streep, Jennifer Aniston, Robert De Niro, Ben Affleck, Laura Dern, Emma Stone, Reese Witherspoon, Ryan Reynolds, and Ariana DeBose) and SAG-AFTRA leaders introduced a proposal that "amounts to the town's biggest earners defraying the costs to AMPTP signatories by eliminating the cap on membership dues, to be used to bolster health benefits and other areas that SAG-AFTRA is trying to shore up. The offer would remove the $1 million cap on membership dues," and ultimately would have brought $150 million over three years. While Crabtree-Ireland found the proposal "worthy of review and consideration" as "someone wanting to help is not someone wanting to undermine," Drescher ultimately rejected the offer, saying that it is not feasible. She instead called upon the AMPTP to resume negotiations with SAG-AFTRA.

On October 20, actress and former SAG president Melissa Gilbert dismissed a message from SAG-AFTRA stating that actors should not wear Halloween costumes of characters from "struck companies," and said: "THIS is what you guys come up with? Literally no one cares what anyone wears for Halloween ... do you really think this kind of infantile stuff is going to end the strike? ... please tell me you're going to make this rule go away... and go negotiate!... people are suffering mightily... this is the kind of silly bullshit that keeps us on strike."

On October 21, a joint statement announced that negotiations would resume on October 24, 2023. After a full day of negotiations on the 24th, the initial plan of meeting on October 25 was moved to October 26. Negotiations thus resumed on October 26, with Crabtree-Ireland stating that they are "100% focused on making a fair deal at the table ... I am cautiously optimistic that can happen. I don't really want to characterize what's going on in the room but we're really focused on just staying prepared and focused on getting the negotiations done." An individual also speculated to The Wrap that "studios believe that if they can't reach a deal in the next week with the Screen Actors Guild, which has been on strike since July 14, then no new production will be able to start before 2024." After the meeting, they announced that negotiations will continue on October 27. Also on October 26, a public letter signed by thousands of high-profile actors was sent to the SAG-AFTRA negotiating committee encouraging them to keep fighting for their values rather than cave in to the studios' demands, saying, "As hard as this is, we would rather stay on strike than take a bad deal."

On October 27, 2023, negotiations continued, but no deal was made, and it was announced that talks will continue over the weekend. The four studio CEOs did not attend the meeting, and Lombardini attended in their stead. The meeting on October 28 was conducted virtually between SAG-AFTRA leaders Drescher, Crabtree-Ireland and the SAG-AFTRA negotiating committee, with the guild awaiting a response from the studios, and plans to meet again on October 29.

Then, after intermittent communications on October 29, a guild source told Deadline Hollywood that there "is a feeling of optimism... looks like we're in the final stretch." Deadline also states that "both sides expressed confidence a deal may be reached within days, but as before cautioned the situation is still fluid. From our understanding, SAG-AFTRA and the studios have gained 'significant' traction on bridging their gap over what has been termed as success-based compensation for streaming shows and their casts." Late in the evening SAG-AFTRA stated: "Both parties will be working independently Monday and re-engage on scheduling at the end of the day." The next day, Crabtree-Ireland informed Deadline that the weekend talks were "productive," and he continues to remain "cautiously optimistic about making progress." Also according to Deadline, he said that SAG-AFTRA and AMPTP are "not just 'dotting I's and crossing T's' just yet... He added that AI is the current focus of talks." Later in the afternoon a "well-positioned individual" told Deadline Hollywood that "There's still a lot of work to be done." Another source told Deadline, "there's a lot of common ground now, and we are building on that... details still have to be determined, but we're heading in the right direction." That evening, SAG-AFTRA released a statement saying they would meet again on October 31.

On October 31, talks ended early out of consideration of families celebrating Halloween, with the intention to meet again on November 1, and with plans to have further meetings later in the week if needed.

=== November ===
Meetings continued from November 1 to November 3. On November 4, SAG-AFTRA lead negotiators stated that they "received an offer today from the AMPTP, which they characterized as their 'Last, Best, and Final Offer' ... we are reviewing it and considering our response within the context of the critical issues addressed in our proposals." On November 5, SAG-AFTRA sent a statement to its members saying that the negotiating team had "analyzed and thoroughly discussed the AMPTP's counter proposal all day and well into the night and will continue our deliberations on Monday." On November 6, SAG-AFTRA sent a letter to members that said: "This morning our negotiators formally responded to the AMPTP's 'Last, Best & Final' offer ... there are several essential items on which we still do not have an agreement, including AI." Later that evening, Deadline Hollywood reported that the virtual meeting ended late, with plans to continue negotiations. A studio insider told Deadline that, "this was a productive session, some work still required before there's a deal." On November 7, SAG-AFTRA and AMPTP met again. A "guild source" told Deadline Hollywood that they "are very close ... not done yet, but very close with strong protection language in place." However, the meeting ended without a deal, and with plans to continue talking on November 8. In addition, Deadline Hollywood reported that it "heard from several sources that guild president Fran Drescher was pinged by A-list stars asking about whether a deal was nigh." Also on November 7, Tyler Perry gave an interview on CBS Mornings. While praising the SAG-AFTRA lead negotiators, he also stated that the work stoppage has been "debilitating," and that "it's really important to know when we've won. This is only a three-year deal. In two years, two-and-a-half years, we'll be renegotiating again ... so we have to know what have we won, and what have we won for now? That's the thing. For now. [...] If I had ran my business trying to get everything at once, I wouldn't be here. I've got as much as I can for now, so let's see what we can do next."

On November 8, 2023, SAG-AFTRA released a statement to its members that announced the end of the strike: "We are thrilled and proud to tell you that today your TV/Theatrical Negotiating Committee voted unanimously to approve a tentative agreement with the AMPTP. As of 12:01am on November 9, our strike is officially suspended and all picket locations are closed." The SAG-AFTRA's National Board committee then approved the agreement by a majority of 86%. The summary of the agreement was published on November 13, 2023. Voting among SAG-AFTRA members began on November 14.

=== December ===
Voting concluded on December 5. The deal was approved with 78.33% support, with a 38.15% turnout.

== Strike activity and responses ==
=== Locations ===
SAG-AFTRA's strikes in Los Angeles targeted the major film studios as well as offices for companies. Drescher personally joined the strikes outside of Netflix's offices. Josh Gad was among the protestors at Fox Entertainment's picket lines. Allison Janney, Kaitlyn Dever, Logan Lerman, and Joey King joined protests at Warner Bros., and actresses Constance Zimmer and Ginnifer Goodwin took part in picket lines at Paramount's Los Angeles studios. Disney's offices saw picket lines whose notable members included Mandy Moore, Michelle Monaghan, Raini and Rico Rodriguez, Danielle Fishel, and Ben Schwartz.

SAG-AFTRA's New York picketing action took place at Paramount's New York headquarters at 1515 Broadway and various offices of NBCUniversal, including Rockefeller Center. Jason Sudeikis joined the NBCUniversal picket lines, stating that actors would strike for "as long as it takes", as did Joe Pantoliano, the Naked Cowboy, Alex Edelman, and Sarah Sherman. Meanwhile, at Paramount's headquarters, picket lines included Michael Schur and Kevin Bacon.

SAG-AFTRA also staged brief strikes at other locations outside of New York and Los Angeles. Branded as "Quick Photo Op" strikes, these took place in Orlando, Honolulu, and Atlanta. The union stated it plans to launch more protests across the country, requesting that SAG-AFTRA members contact their local executives for details.

=== Media executives' response ===
Before the end of SAG-AFTRA's negotiations, an unnamed AMPTP executive stated that their strategy was to "allow things to drag on until union members [started] losing their apartments and losing their houses" to force SAG-AFTRA into less favorable negotiating positions.

Casey Bloys, CEO of HBO and Max, said that the strike would slow everything down, and predicted that it would heavily affect HBO's 2024 season.

Bob Iger, CEO of The Walt Disney Company, said the actors' demands were "not realistic", adding they were "adding to the set of challenges that this business is already facing". Iger has been criticized for these remarks in light of his contract with Disney, which allows him to earn as much as $27 million in 2023 between his salary and bonuses. TheWrap wrote that Iger makes over 500 times the median salary of Disney employees, while Town & Country wrote it was actually 1,242 times a Disney employee's median salary. Drescher described Iger's remarks as "repugnant" and "tone deaf", and the Wall Street Journal also called him "tone deaf". Actor Bryan Cranston also responded to Iger, saying: "We will not be having our jobs taken away and given to robots."

=== Politicians' response ===
U.S. President Joe Biden, Vermont U.S. senator Bernie Sanders, and Mayor of Los Angeles Karen Bass voiced their support for the actors' union. Biden had previously supported the writers on strike in May 2023. Some politicians joined the picket lines themselves, including Burbank mayor Konstantine Anthony (himself a SAG-AFTRA member) and California U.S. Representative Adam Schiff. U.S. Representative Alexandria Ocasio-Cortez joined the picket line in front of Netflix studios in New York City. She criticized the wealth of studio executives while the average screenwriter or actor struggles to get access to healthcare, and she emphasized the power of direct action in achieving economic victories.

Both Bass and Governor of California Gavin Newsom offered to help mediate an end to the strikes.

=== Other unions' response ===
Numerous other labor unions in the United States expressed support for the strike. Along with the Writers' Guild, statements of support were released by the Directors Guild and Producers Guild. The International Brotherhood of Teamsters, which was itself in a contractual dispute with UPS at the time and was scheduled to go on strike at the end of July unless an agreement was reached, expressed support through a statement released by their president, Sean O'Brien. The AFL–CIO additionally threw their support behind SAG-AFTRA, as did the Department for Professional Employees, the International Alliance of Theatrical Stage Employees, and the Writers Guild of America, East.

=== Other organizations' response ===
Two forthcoming film festivals, the Toronto International Film Festival and the Venice International Film Festival, acknowledged the potential impact of the strike and its associated ban on promotional appearances by actors if the strike was not resolved by September but indicated that both events would proceed regardless, with an increase of Canadian, European, Asian, and South American titles in all sections being expected. However, leaders of SAG-AFTRA had been adamant that actors in movies with interim agreements should be at festivals to promote them.

=== Impact ===
On October 30, 2023, the Hunger Games prequel film The Hunger Games: The Ballad of Songbirds & Snakes was given an interim agreement so that actors could promote the film during the strike. However, a large number of productions were suspended or had their release date delayed because of the strike.

The Australian film industry was affected by the strike, although wholly local film and TV productions, even those engaging SAG members, could continue. Cast and crew working on series and films funded from the US were stood down during the strike, but Australian-scripted productions using Australian and SAG members would not be affected by the strike order "if they were engaged under Australian industry contracts agreed to by SAG-AFTRA and the MEAA". Screen Producers Australia supported the strike, but said that its members would not be supported if they withheld their labour. Mortal Kombat II and Apples Never Fall were temporarily suspended. The strike had a negative effect on foreign productions shot in Australia, after a recent increase which was worth AUD$1.22B ($780M).

On August 15, 2023, Lucasfilm announced that it would be shutting down its Singapore operations. Disney explained that the shutdown was due to economic factors, with the SAG-AFTRA strike in the United States affecting the industry's work.

According to Deadline Hollywood, the "harshest pain" was "perhaps felt among the below-the-line workers who've had to sell or mortgage their homes, and wipe through IRAs to survive."

== Aftermath ==
On July 26, 2024, SAG-AFTRA began a video game strike against video game developers for similar reasons related to AI use. The strike was initiated based on the authorization that was approved in September 2023.

== See also ==
- List of Hollywood strikes
- List of US strikes by size
- 2023 Writers Guild of America strike
- 2016–2017 video game voice actor strike
- Impact of the COVID-19 pandemic on television in the United States
