= 2023 Hollywood labor disputes =

American media labor disputes

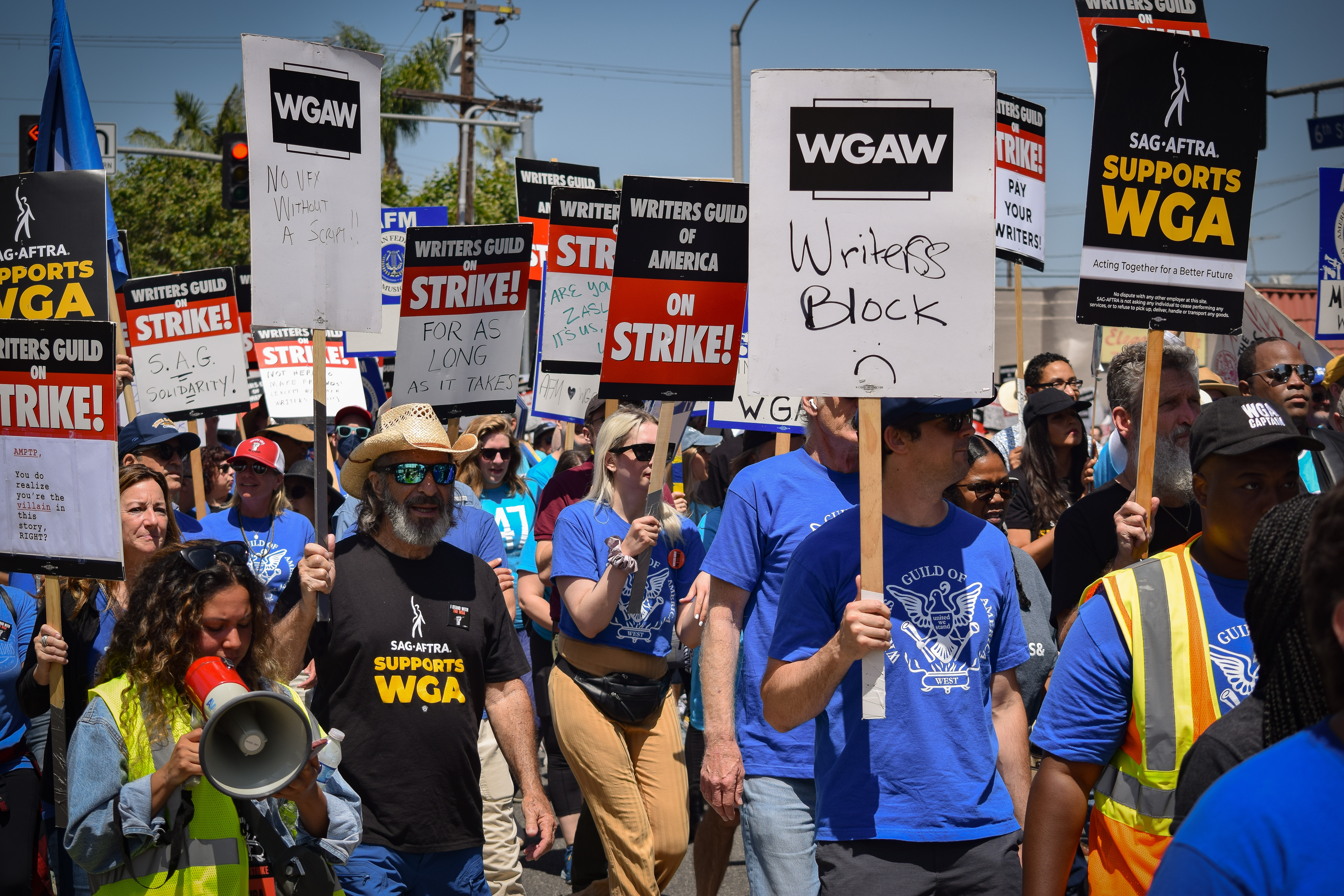
- WGA and SAG-AFTRA members marching in unison, June 2023
- Date: May 2 – November 9, 2023 (6 months and 7 days, or 191 days)
- Location: United States; Primarily Los Angeles and New York City
- Caused by: Lack of compensation from streaming services; Developments in artificial intelligence (AI) threatening job security for screenwriters and actors
- Goals: Pay raises for screenwriters and actors; Safeguarding of jobs against advancements in AI technology
- Methods: Strike action; Work stoppage; Picketing
- Result: WGA tentative agreement reached on September 24 and strike ended on September 27; contract ratified on October 9.; SAG-AFTRA tentative agreement reached on November 8 and strike ended on November 9; contract ratified on December 5.

Parties
Writers Guild of America (Note: Although Writers Guild of America West and Writers Guild of America East are separate organizations, they participate in strike actions as a single entity); (until September 27): Writers Guild of America West; Writers Guild of America East; SAG-AFTRA; (from July 14)	Alliance of Motion Picture and Television Producers

Lead figures
Fran Drescher; Meredith Stiehm; Michael Winship	Carol Lombardini

Number
SAG-AFTRA: 160,000+ WGA: 24,000+ (West), 5,000+ (East) (2019)	350+ production companies, streaming services, and broadcast networks

From May 2 to November 9, 2023, a series of long labor disputes within the film and television industries of the United States took place, mainly focused on the strikes of the Writers Guild of America and SAG-AFTRA. It was the second time two Hollywood labor unions were striking simultaneously—the first having occurred in 1960—and as such, the American news media named this phenomenon the "Hollywood double strike", and surpassed the 1960 dual strike as well. By November 9, 2023, both the Writers Guild and SAG-AFTRA had reached tentative deals with the Alliance of Motion Picture and Television Producers and ended their strikes.

In July, The New York Times predicted that with the actors’ union joining, "viewers are likely to notice the effects of the dual walkouts more broadly within the next couple of months". Both labor disputes have caused the largest interruption to the American film and television industries since the onset of the COVID-19 pandemic in 2020.

On September 24, 2023, WGA suspended picketing upon reaching a tentative agreement. Following a vote, the union leadership voted to end the strike on September 27, 2023, at 12:01 a.m. PDT. On November 8, 2023, SAG-AFTRA reached a tentative agreement and the strike ended on November 9, at 12:01 a.m. PST.

== Primary issues ==
The primary issues causing labor disputes between studios and artists in both unions are intellectual property rights, artistic integrity, the lack of residuals from streaming services, and new developments within artificial intelligence and synthetic media technology. The COVID-19 pandemic caused a significant disruption to the film and television industries, with many productions being shut down for months. This led to several layoffs for writers, animators, actors, and other positions in the creative department. These layoffs were exacerbated by the shift to streaming, which has led to a decrease in revenue for traditional media companies, such as television networks and movie studios. As a result, major reductions in the workforce and cancellations of multiple film and television productions were done as a cheap, low-end way to save money on bare-minimum costs, such as basic residuals and music licensing, but Apple and Amazon remain outliers.

== Declared strikes ==
=== Writers Guild of America strike ===
The 2023 Writers Guild of America strike was a labor dispute between the Writers Guild of America (WGA)—representing 11,500 screenwriters—and the Alliance of Motion Picture and Television Producers (AMPTP). It began at 12:01 a.m. PDT on May 2, 2023. The strike was the largest interruption to American television and film production since the COVID-19 pandemic in 2020, as well as the largest labor stoppage the WGA has performed since the 2007–08 strike.

Between September 20 and 24, a series of promising negotiations between the WGA and four prominent studio CEOs were held, which ended in a tentative agreement. The strike ended on September 27, 2023, at 12:01 AM PDT.

=== SAG-AFTRA strike ===
The 2023 SAG-AFTRA strike was a labor strike between actors in the labor union SAG-AFTRA and the AMPTP. The strike began at midnight PDT on July 14, 2023, after the SAG-AFTRA's national board of directors held a vote approving the strike. The strike marks the first time that actors have initiated a labor dispute since the 1980 actors strike.

On September 1, the SAG-AFTRA National Board voted to send the video game strike authorization vote to its members, and on September 25, the results showed the authorization passed with 98.32% voting in favor.

After the WGA and AMPTP reached a tentative agreement September 24, leading to the official end of the WGA strike on September 27, SAG-AFTRA announced that it remains on strike, and called for renewed negotiations with the AMPTP.

On November 8, 2023, SAG-AFTRA reached a tentative agreement and the strike ended on November 9. The deal was approved with 78.33% support, with a 38.15% turnout. Vox stated that the solidarity shown towards the strikers from other Hollywood unions is extraordinary and "remarkable in contrast to the last strike in 2007", while Business Insider noted that the disputes are among a recent trend of a stronger labor movement.

In July 2023, shortly before SAG-AFTRA declared their strike, Deadline Hollywood reported that the Alliance of Motion Picture and Television Producers was seeking to use a "divide and conquer" approach among the different Hollywood unions. The article said that the AMPTP would not negotiate with the WGA until October at the earliest and quoted one studio executive as saying, "The endgame is to allow things to drag on until union members start losing their apartments and losing their houses." The article and quote received attention and backlash from both Hollywood outlets, such as Paramount Global's Entertainment Tonight, and non-Hollywood outlets, such as Vanity Fair and the New York Daily News.

== Reactions to the strikes ==
The Directors Guild of America, the Producers Guild of America, the Actors' Equity Association, UNITE HERE Local 11, the British Actors' Equity Association, the International Brotherhood of Teamsters, the American Federation of Musicians, Hollywood Basic Crafts, the International Alliance of Theatrical Stage Employees, the Writers Guild of America East, the Alliance of Canadian Cinema, Television and Radio Artists, President of the United States Joe Biden, Vermont U.S. senator Bernie Sanders, and Mayor of Los Angeles Karen Bass all issued statements of support after SAG-AFTRA announced their intention to join WGA in striking. Vox stated that the solidarity shown towards the strikers from other Hollywood unions is extraordinary and "remarkable in contrast to the last strike in 2007", while Business Insider noted that the disputes are among a recent trend of a stronger labor movement.

== Productions affected ==
The strikes led to a lack of ongoing film and television productions, which resulted in some studios having to close doors or reduce staff. The strike also jeopardized long-term contracts created during the media streaming boom when producers were shelling out large sums to creative talent. The big studios can terminate production deals with writers through force majeure clauses after 90 days (of non-delivery), thus saving the studios millions of dollars. In addition, numerous other areas within the global entertainment ecosystem were impacted by the strike action. Examples include the VFX industry and prop making studios.

== See also ==
- Impact of the COVID-19 pandemic on cinema
- Impact of the COVID-19 pandemic on television in the United States
