= Jonathan Handel =

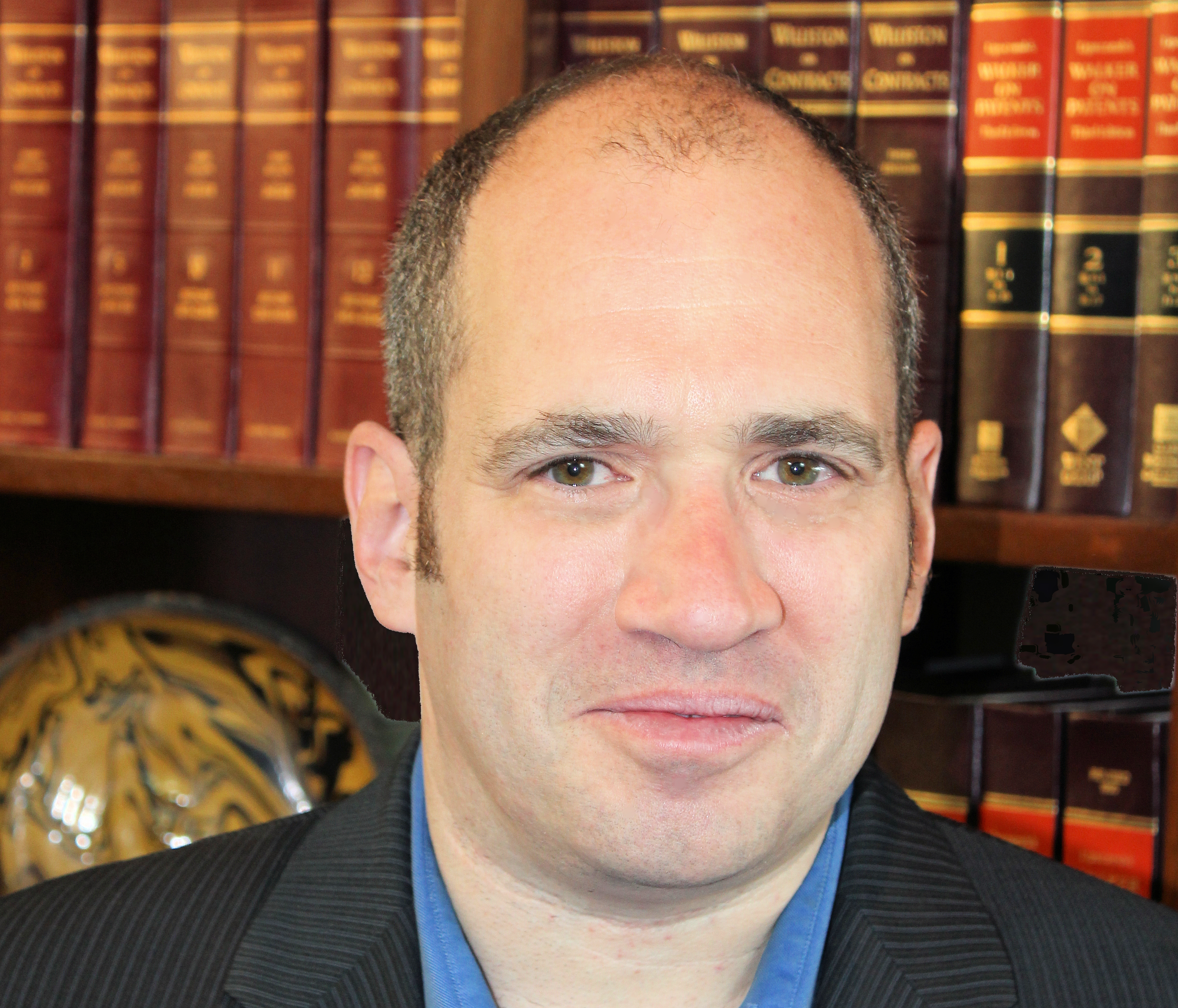
- Jonathan Handel
- Education: Harvard University (AB, JD)

Jonathan Handel is an American entertainment lawyer, journalist, author and commentator.

Handel is an expert on entertainment labor, having reported extensively on the WGA, SAG-AFTRA, DGA, IATSE and other unions. He has previously served as outside Special Counsel to SAG-AFTRA, and on the legal staff of the WGA.

Prior to this, he was a journalist at The Hollywood Reporter, and has also written for the Los Angeles Times, Variety and Puck. Additionally, he has authored five books and is an adjunct professor at Southwestern Law School and lecturer in law at the USC Gould School of Law.

He currently practices entertainment and technology law at TroyGould and serves as an executive at WIO.

== Education and career ==
Handel studied Applied Mathematics, graduating from Harvard College in 1982, and Harvard Law School in 1990.

He began his law career clerking for Judge Irving Goldberg on the United States Court of Appeals for the Fifth Circuit in Dallas, TX.

In 1991, he was selected to serve as a federal associate independent counsel to investigate alleged White House political misconduct related to the search of then-Arkansas Gov. Bill Clinton's passport files.

In the months prior to the 2007–2008 Writers Guild of America strike, Handel began publishing a series of blogs on the Huffington Post, leading to him becoming recognized as an expert regarding Hollywood unions.

From 2010 to 2020, Handel was a journalist at The Hollywood Reporter.

In 2020, he was appointed as outside Special Counsel to SAG-AFTRA.

As of 2022, Handel serves as an executive at WIO, an entertainment software company.

Handel regularly provides legal analysis for media outlets such as The New York Times, BBC, Reuters, NBC, CNN, ABC and CBS.

== Residuals ==
Handel is an expert on entertainment royalties, having authored the only book on residuals.

== Personal ==
Handel is the son of late sociologist Gerald S. Handel.

== Works ==
- Entertainment residuals: a full color guide, Hollywood Analytics, 2014
- The New Zealand Hobbit crisis: how Warner Bros. bent a government to its will and crushed an attempt to unionize The hobbit, Hollywood Analytics, 2013
- Entertainment labor: an interdisciplinary bibliography, Hollywood Analytics, 2013
- Hollywood on strike!: an industry at war in the internet age, Hollywood Analytics, 2011
- How to write loi's and term sheets, Jonathan Handel, 2009
