= Residual (entertainment industry) =

Form of financial compensation

Residuals are financial compensations that are paid to film or television actors, writers, directors, and others involved in making TV shows and movies in cases of the cable reruns, syndication, DVD release, or licensing to streaming media. Residuals are calculated by producers and studios, and administered by industry trade unions like SAG-AFTRA, the Directors Guild of America, and the Writers Guild of America. The word is typically used in the plural form.

== History ==
Technological advances gave rise to residual payments, and their evolution can be traced in terms of those technologies.

=== Radio ===
Residuals were established in U.S. network radio. Live radio programs with nationwide audiences were generally performed either two or three times to account for different time zones between the east and west coasts of the United States. The performers were paid for each performance. After audio "transcription disc" technology became widely available in the late 1930s, it was initially used to make recordings to send to radio stations that were not connected to the live network. As sound quality improved, radio networks began using them for time-delaying west coast broadcasts, eventually eliminating the need for multiple performances. The performers were kept on standby and paid for a second performance in case there were technical problems. This established the precedent for residual payments from recorded performances.

=== Television ===
In the early 1950s, a similar transition occurred in television. Initially, most television broadcasts were either live performances or broadcasts of older films originally produced for theaters. Kinescope recordings were made of live east coast performances so they could be broadcast several hours later on the west coast, which also made it possible to broadcast these shows later as many times as they wanted. In 1952, residual payments were extended to these television reruns, thanks in large part to Ronald Reagan, whose first term as president of the Screen Actors Guild (SAG) ran from 1947 to 1952. In 1953, the WGA negotiated residuals for up to five reruns for made-for-TV shows.

That said, film actors were still not paid residuals for reruns. As Americans increasingly watched TV at home instead of going out to the movies, movie attendance plummeted by over 65% between 1948 and 1959, studios were grappling with decreased revenues, and actors felt like they were being deprived of significant income that was owed to them. The studios, however, took a hardline stance on residuals for movie actors due to their shrinking revenue as well as the fact that if they paid residuals to actors, they would also have to pay directors and screenwriters as well.

This stalemate led SAG actors to re-elect Ronald Reagan as SAG President in fall of 1959. Reagan asked SAG for a strike authorization in February and the actors agreed on a work-stop date for March 7, 1960, Hollywood's first-ever industry-wide strike. Starting with Universal Pictures, studios ended up agreeing to film residuals, but only for movies made after 1960. They would issue a one-time payout of $2.25 million for movies made between 1948 and 1960, and movies made before 1948 would not be eligible for any residuals. (Unrelated to residuals, Reagan also secured health insurance and pensions for SAG actors.) This upset older actors like Mickey Rooney, Glenn Ford and Bob Hope, who blamed Reagan and the SAG board for weak negotiating, but in April 1960 SAG voted to accept the offer and returned to work.

In 1988, WGA launched its longest strike, lasting 22 weeks, over a disagreement over residuals for TV shows broadcast in foreign countries. The new contract allowed writers two formulas for calculating foreign residuals: the existing formula ($4,400 maximum for a one-hour show) or the new formula (1.2% of the producer's foreign sales). On the other hand, domestic residuals were adjusted to take a sliding scale, which would incentivize producers to syndicate one-hour shows, whose revenue performance was poor, to independent TV stations.

=== New media ===
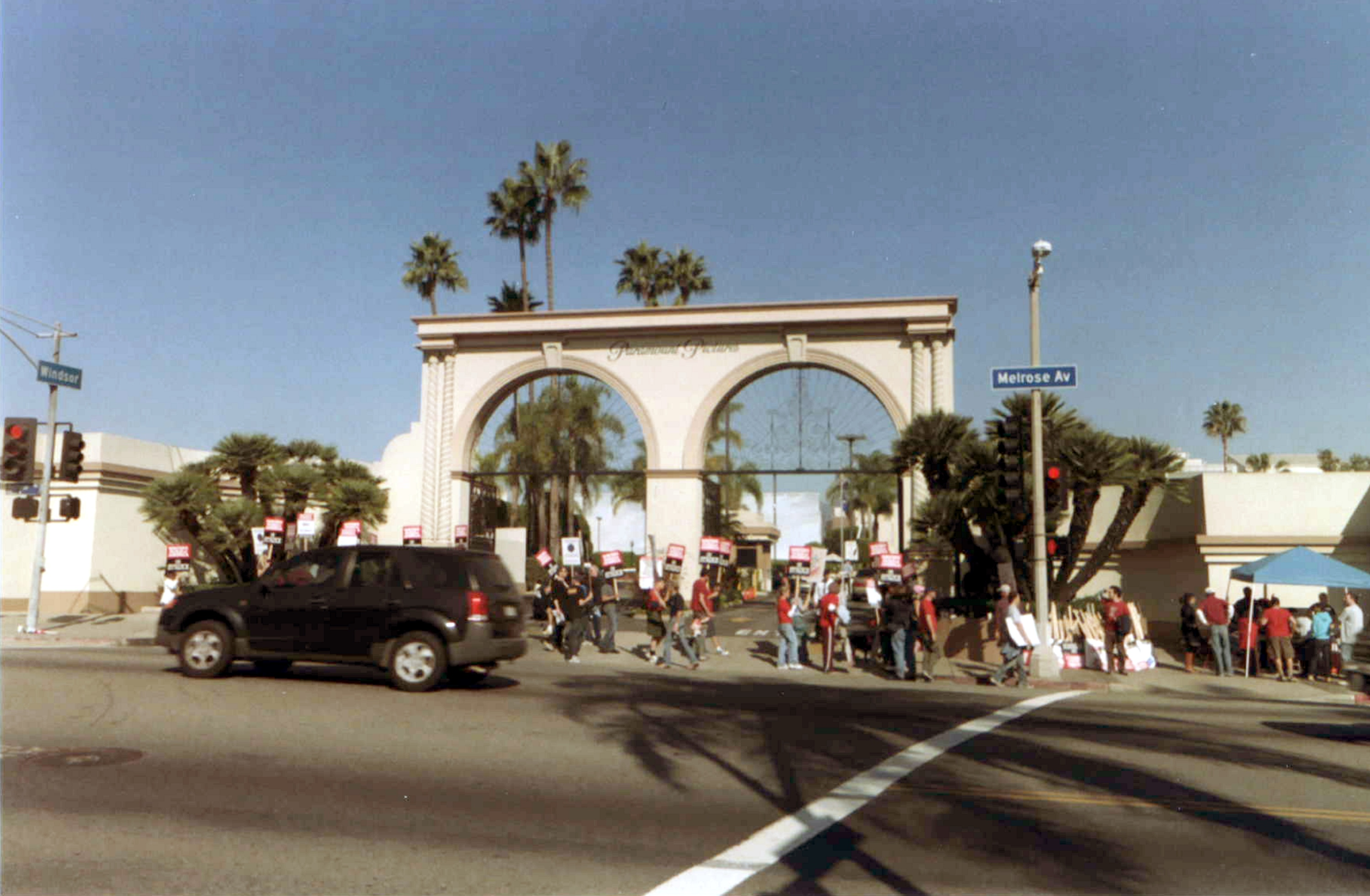
The front gate of Paramount Studios on November 12, 2007, during the 2007–08 WGA strike

In 2007, the Alliance of Motion Picture and Television Producers (AMPTP), the industry bargaining group that deals with the trade unions, called for an end to the current residual payment system in response to the rise of online media. Instead, it proposed that residuals be pooled so the studios would recoup their costs paying the actors, directors, and writers based on a profit-based formula, which would solve the problem that residuals remain the same despite decreases in TV profits. Writers in the Writers Guild of America (WGA) decided to negotiate for higher residual payments. The AMPTP adamantly opposed extending residuals to online movie and TV show sales for at least three years, citing the need to "adapt to the realities of the marketplace, the new demands from our audiences and new technologies", while a WGA representative countered that they "already had effective business models".

In 2011, SAG-AFTRA, WGA, and DGA negotiations kept residuals for network primetime TV (considered "among the most lucrative" residuals) frozen at previous levels.

== Process ==
Residuals are administered by the unions—SAG-AFTRA, the Directors Guild of America (DGA), and the Writers Guild of America (WGA)—for their members, who are paid between one and four months after the air date. According to SAG-AFTRA, it processes around 1.5 million residual checks a year. WGA receives between 100 and 5,000 residual checks a day. The DGA processes "hundreds of thousands of checks" a year, and in 2016 it processed $300 million in residuals for its members.

Residual calculation is complex and depends on several variables, including guild membership, initial payment, time spent, type of production (e.g., network TV, DVD, ad-supported streaming, online purchases), and whether it involves a domestic or foreign market. Additionally, residuals change a lot: guilds negotiate new contracts with the AMPTP every three years, and residuals for primetime TV tend to increase every year because they are "directly or indirectly keyed to salary minimums, which increase several percent per year". Moreover, very few platforms exist to track broadcast airings, which is necessary to accurately calculate payouts.

In acting, extras are generally not eligible, but stunt performers, puppeteers, singers, and actors with lines or scripted physical interactions with characters ("supporting actors" or "day players") are eligible. Principal performers generally get larger residuals. In fact, the more prominent the actor, the more generous the residual. Big stars like Tom Cruise, for example, would get a portion of DVD sales in addition to his "regular" residuals.

All "credited" writers are eligible for residuals, and the specific credit determines the amount of residual. For example, the "written by" credit yields a 100% residual allocation, "screenplay/teleplay by" yields a 75%, and "adaptation by" yields 10%.

=== Examples ===
Residual payments can sometimes be very small if the role was small or the movie or show was not successful. For example, actor Jeff Cohen received a residual check for $0.67 after appearing in one episode of The Facts of Life; he took it to a former bar in Studio City called "Maeve's Re$iduals", which used to trade free drinks for any SAG-AFTRA residual checks for less than $1.

By contrast, Bob Gunton, who played Warden Norton in The Shawshank Redemption, noted that the movie, one of the most-rerun films, generated "close to six figures" in residuals for him in 2004, ten years after the movie was released, and even as of 2014, that he continued to receive "a very substantial income".

In 2014, actress Lisa Kudrow of Friends was ordered to pay $1.6 million to her former manager, who argued that he was owed 5% of Kudrow's residuals earnings from work that he negotiated. Using figures that were publicly disclosed, one analyst estimated Kudrow's residuals to be at least $2.3 million, and likely much higher.

== See also ==
- Film distribution
- Film finance
- Royalties
- List of Hollywood strikes involving residuals:
  - 1960 Writers Guild of America strike
  - 1981 Writers Guild of America strike
  - 1988 Writers Guild of America strike
  - 2007–08 Writers Guild of America strike
  - 2016–17 video game voice actor strike
  - 2023 Writers Guild of America strike
  - 2023 SAG-AFTRA strike
- Jonathan Handel (residuals expert)
