= Gerald S. Handel =

American sociologist

Gerald S. Handel (August 8, 1924 – December 24, 2017) was an American sociologist who served as professor emeritus of sociology at The City College and The Graduate Center of the City University of New York. He earned A.B., A.M and Ph.D. degrees from The University of Chicago, where he was influenced by the Symbolic Interactionist ideas of George Herbert Mead and Charles Horton Cooley.

== Life and career ==
Handel was born in Cleveland, Ohio in August 1924. That influence contributed to shaping the research study that resulted in the book Family Worlds (1959) by Hess & Handel. This study of two-parent, first-marriage families with two or three children between the ages of six and eighteen was the first sociological study of families based on interviews with both parents and all the children, leading to an endorsement by University of Minnesota family sociologist Reuben Hill: “breaks new ground in the social psychology of the family.”

Handel later published a paper, “Family Worlds and Qualitative Family Research: Emergence and Prospects of Whole Family Methodology” (1996) showing that the concepts and methods developed in Family Worlds were equally applicable to families of any composition, with at least three members, whose members inhabited a shared household over an extended period of time. The original study also reflected the influence of W. Lloyd Warner’s idea of social class; Warner was a teacher of both authors. Handel's edited book, The Psychosocial Interior of the Family (1967) sought to extend the range of the basic ideas.

Handel's Making a Life in Yorkville: Experience and Meaning in the Life-Course Narrative of an Urban Working-Class Man (2000, 2003) is a symbolic interactionist study of the life course. It presents the unedited text of life-history interviews he conducted with a construction worker, and an analytic framework that seeks to broaden understanding of the life course.

Having responsibility for an undergraduate course in social welfare, Handel wrote Social Welfare in Western Society (1982), which conceptualizes social welfare as based on the concept of Help, and argues that social welfare in Western society has been based on five eventually competing concepts of Help: namely, Charity, Public Welfare, Social Insurance, Social Service, and Mutual Aid. The concepts and the socio-political conflicts over them are examined historically, The concluding chapter discusses enduring issues in social welfare. An updated edition appeared in 2009.

Handel's collaborative work includes Children and Society (2005), The Apple Sliced: Sociological Studies of New York City (1984), Qualitative Methods in Family Research (1992), and Workingman’s Wife (1959). He is also the author of numerous journal articles, book chapters, and conference presentations.

He died in Scarsdale, New York in December 2017 at the age of 93.
