= 1960 Writers Guild of America strike =

Labor dispute between the Guild and the Alliance of Television Film Producers

- Part of 1960 Hollywood labor disputes
- Date: January 16 – June 12, 1960 (4 months, 3 weeks and 6 days, or 148 days)
- Location: United States
- Caused by: Lack of agreement on a new contract between the WGA and the Alliance of Television Film Producers.
- Goals: Improve rights and pensions for screenwriters
- Methods: Strike action; Work stoppage; Picketing

Parties
| Writers Guild of America West; Writers Guild of America, East | Alliance of Television Film Producers |

The 1960 Writers Guild of America strike was a labor dispute between the Guild and the Alliance of Television Film Producers. It lasted 148 days, from January 16 to June 12, 1960.

On January 16, 1960, citing “a consistently uncompromising attitude on the part of producers,” WGA president Curtis Kenyon, a former screenwriter now toiling in television, called a “two-pronged” strike against both film and television production. Among the demands: residuals “in perpetuity” and not merely for six reruns; a cut of the profit stream from foreign distribution; and more equitable working practices, particularly concerning speculative, or “spec,” writing.

The strike ended with improved rights and pensions for screenwriters. One outcome of the strike was that 5% of the net studio earnings from television airings of pre-1960 films would be contributed to pensions, healthcare, and other funds that helped writers.

The 1960 Screen Actors Guild strike also occurred at the same time on March 7, 1960, as part of the broader labor dispute. The actors' strike lasted six weeks, becoming paler when compared to this strike. The two unions would not strike simultaneously for another sixty-three years until the 2023 Writers Guild of America strike and 2023 SAG-AFTRA strike both took place, with the former ultimately tied.

== See also ==
- List of Hollywood strikes
  - 1981 Writers Guild of America strike
  - 1988 Writers Guild of America strike
  - 2007–08 Writers Guild of America strike
  - 2023 Hollywood labor disputes
