= 2016–2017 video game voice actor strike =

American union strike

2016–17 video game voice actor strike
- Date: October 18, 2016 – September 23, 2017 (11 months and 5 days)
- Location: United States
- Caused by: Failed contract renegotiation terms of Interactive Media Agreements; Voice actors not being allowed to earn residuals for their work on video games
- Goals: Residuals given to voice actors for their work on video games; Transparency in what roles and conditions actors would perform; More safety precautions to avoid vocal stress; Better safety assurances for actors while on set
- Methods: Strike; Work stoppage; Picketing
- Result: Tentative agreement reached on September 23, 2017; Agreement ratified on November 8, 2017

Parties
| SAG-AFTRA | Activision Publishing; Blindlight; Corps of Discovery Films; Disney Character Voices; Electronic Arts; Formosa Interactive; Insomniac Games; Interactive Associates; Take 2 Interactive; VoiceWorks Productions; WB Games |

From October 2016 to September 2017, SAG-AFTRA, representing video game voice actors, went on strike against American video game companies over failed contract renegotiation terms of the Interactive Media Agreements that had been in discussion since February 2015. The union sought to have actors, voice actors, and motion-capture actors who contribute to video games be better compensated with residuals based on video game sales atop their existing recording payments; the game companies asserted that the industry as a whole eschews the use of residuals, and by giving the actors these, they would trivialize the efforts of the developers who are "most responsible" for the development of the games. In exchange, the companies had offered a fixed increase in rates and a sliding-scale upfront bonus for multiple recording sessions, which the union had rejected. Other issues highlighted by the strike include better transparency in what roles and conditions actors would perform, more safety precautions and oversight to avoid vocal stress for certain roles, and better safety assurances for actors while on set.

Actors within the union used both physical and virtual picketing to make the public aware of their complaints, and gained support from the American Federation of Labor and Congress of Industrial Organizations, the Actors' Equity Association, the British Actors' Equity Association, the Alliance of Canadian Cinema, Television and Radio Artists, the Australian Media, Entertainment and Arts Alliance, and Equity New Zealand, who requested that their members not take any of the acting work that was open due to the striking actors. It was the first such unionized strike in the video game industry. Due to the commonly long development period for video games, the strike's impact on the industry was initially expected to be felt for years.

A deal between SAG-AFTRA and the companies was reached on September 23, 2017, effectively ending the strike after 340 days, making it the longest strike in the union's history at this point in time. The agreement was ratified by SAG-AFTRA's board of directors and approved by majority vote in November 2017, creating a new three-year contract. The deal was praised by some but largely criticized by voice actors, who felt that the union conceded too much to the video game companies in order to accept a pay rise for actors and pointed out that the agreement did not include residuals or any specific terms in regards to the issue of vocal stress.

== Background ==
Around a quarter of video games use some type of acting, either as live actors for full motion video, voice actors, or stunt actors for motion capture. As the video game industry became more financially successful in the early 2010s and video game hardware became more ubiquitous in households, many video game developers and publishers started to bring in well-recognized actors from avenues such as film and television for recording lines or footage for video games. Obtaining recognized actors for games can help to sell the title and generate potential promotional leads from non-traditional channels, such as having that actor promote the game while on talk shows.

Within the United States, several of these actors are members of the Screen Actors Guild (SAG) or American Federation of Television and Radio Artists (AFTRA), which merged into SAG-AFTRA in October 2012. The merged union has around 165,000 members as of 2016, with about 6,000 members that perform regularly for video games. As early as the 1990s, these unions had developed Interactive Media Agreements with the video game industry to set standard rates for a typical four-hour recording session; in 2005, this was about $759, increasing to about $800–825 in 2013. These are considered as minimum assured rates, but actors are free to negotiate higher rates with the game's developer or publisher. The majority of video games use non-union actors, with Deadline estimating in 2016 that a quarter of games are union projects, with more established actors working on games.

Unlike other entertainment media such as film or television, video game voice actors are not paid residuals or secondary compensation based on the success of a game. Part of this is related to the relative age of the video game industry, which only recently has been seen to be as successful as film or television; in 2005, the video game industry was worth about $11 billion, while the film industry drew in over $100 billion. As such, demanding residuals at that time was not seen as a necessary benefit to the actors. Many actors had additional jobs in other entertainment sectors besides video games, and receiving residuals was not critical for them to make a living. Video games were also rarely promoted to emphasize the actors behind the characters, unlike television and film, as consumers were unlikely to be directed towards purchasing a game based on its selection of actors. Further, the video game industry itself is not as profitable as large growth numbers suggest, as much of the money earned by a sales or title is spent to offset the already-spent costs of having a large team of programmers and artists to develop the game.

The video game industry has grown quickly since 2005, with projections that it would become a $100 billion industry by 2018. As early as 2008, discussions and arguments from the actors' unions stated that the video game industry should pay residuals on sales to actors, seeking equality with other entertainment industries with the potential for a strike action if the industry did not agree. More pay was negotiated in June 2005 and informing actors of "vocally stressful work" was negotiated in October 2009. Michael Hollick stated that he had only been paid about $100,000 for voicing Niko Bellic, the main character of Grand Theft Auto IV (2008), which earned more than $600 million within its first three weeks of release. Despite this discussion, SAG-AFTRA and the industry negotiated continuations on the Interactive Media Agreement without the inclusion of residuals; in the most recent successful negotiation, to extend the Interactive Media Agreement through 2014, the two sides agreed to account for additional session fees for actors in games designed for cloud gaming.

== 2015–2016 negotiations ==
With the Interactive Media Agreement to expire by the end of 2014, SAG-AFTRA and representatives of the video game industry began negotiating new agreement terms in late 2014. The parties had not come to an agreement when the Agreement expired, but the union members agreed to continue to provide acting work at the existing rates in good faith while negotiations continued. Meetings were held between parties in February and June 2015. At these meetings, the SAG-AFTRA representatives started pushing for inclusion of residual payments, stating that the video game industry now has the ability to pay such residuals because it "has grown, boomed and morphed into something bigger and lucrative than any other segment of the entertainment industry, and it continues to do so". The union sought "performance bonuses" that would earn actors an additional $825 for each session they did on a game for every 2 million copies of that game sold, up to 8 million copies. The industry stated they were concerned that this type of payment structure would be financially harmful.

The union was also concerned for actors involved in "vocally stressful" roles, and sought to have similar restrictions on session time and foreknowledge that one would give for stunt acting. Around June 2016, SAG-AFTRA sent a letter co-signed by several of its members to the California division of the Occupational Safety and Health Administration (OSHA) requesting them to investigate health and safety issues related to the "vocally stressful" roles, citing several members who had developed vocal cord damage while recording screams and shouts for video games. The union specifically asked the division to evaluate these injuries resulting "voice acting in video games due to employers pushing too hard or not providing adequate safety measures". The union said that they do not want to force new OSHA-driven regulations on the industry but considered this as a point of last resort if the video game industry did not help alleviate this situation.

A third point of negotiation arose from transparency aspects for voice actor roles, an element that comes from the industry's background in the technology sector. Video game companies had relied on the same type of secrecy that high tech firms use, enforced by strict non-disclosure agreements, and do not want to have details of future games be presented to potential actors before they have committed to the part. These companies generally feared that leaks of seemingly trivial details from voice actors from a yet-announced or yet-published game can create a significant impact via social media, and could lead to competitors in the industry beating a company to market with their own product. Even after actors have accepted their part, they may not have been told any details outside fundamental aspects of the character they are to voice or perform as, and with auditions and recording sessions that occur through email and remote communications, the actors could not inquire about the role, leaving them unprepared. The situation left actors unclear about the role they are expected to perform until they were on the job, which created issues if the role required "vocally stressful" situations. In some cases, voice actors were not told what game they have performed for, only to discover their involvement after a game is published, making it difficult to maintain a professional resume for other gigs. The union sought to have the video game industry provide sufficient details to actors about their parts without having to sacrifice their secrecy, so that actors can better negotiate terms of their contracts.

By September 2015, SAG-AFTRA considered the negotiations to not go well, finding the industry's demands untenable, and proceeded to have its members vote for a strike authorization. Union members agreed to authorize a strike by a 96% margin in October 2015, giving the SAG-AFTRA negotiators a bargaining chip to use during further discussions with the industry.

Negotiations continued into 2016. Alongside the main negotiations for the Interactive Media Agreement renewal, SAG-AFTRA had started discussions to craft a special "low budget" agreement for union voice actors, defined for games with less than a $250,000 production budget, such as most indie games. The terms of this agreement addressed similar points as the broader Interactive Media Agreement negotiations, including dealing with "vocally stressful" roles, and would offer performance bonuses for every 500,000 units sold, up to 2 million units.

By October 2016, the two sides had agreed to a 9% increase in the base session fee, but still stood at odds on the issues of residuals. While SAG-AFTRA still offered their session payment plan based on copies sold, the video game industry offered an up-front sliding-scale bonus based on how many sessions that actor performed for the game, starting at $50 for a single session and up to $950 for eight or more sessions. This bonus would be paid upfront to actors in lieu of the residuals. Analysts believed that for a profitable video game (one exceeding $2 million in revenue or more), the financial terms of both SAG-AFTRA's and the industry's plans were nearly on financial equity. However, the negotiations broke down because of how this performance bonus was to be written into the contract. SAG-AFTRA wanted to call their payments approach as "residual buyout", thus fulfilling their goal to obtain some type of residual payment to its members. The industry balked at this characterization, pointing out that the programmers and artists behind the games do not receive such residuals. Scott Witlin, a Barnes & Thornburg lawyer negotiating for the video game companies, stated that the work provided by actors "represent less than one tenth of 1 percent of the work that goes into making a video game" and thus their demands were excessive. The industry also feared that by writing the language of "residuals" into the contract, it would give the union more ability to demand a more traditional residual payment structure during the next contract negotiations. SAG-AFTRA considered that the industry's approach was a "freeloader model of compensation", and did not consider it suitable for its members. The disagreement has been characterized by some as hinging on the single word "residuals"; as described by The Hollywood Reporter's Jonathan Handel, the language of how "residuals" is presented is critical, as it is "a must-have for the union and a camel's-nose-under-the-tent deal-breaker for the companies".

== 2016–2017 strike ==
With failure to come to agreement on this language, SAG-AFTRA used the previous authorization from its membership to issue a strike on October 21, 2016. In addition to the residual payment issue, SAG-AFTRA said that the strike also related to transparency in the voice actor hiring processes so that actors are aware of what types of roles and performances they are to be hired for, issues related to the "vocally stressful" roles, and having more safety precautions while actors were on-set. The strike action targeted 11 companies: Activision Publishing, Blindlight, Corps of Discovery Films, Disney Character Voices, Electronic Arts, Formosa Interactive, Insomniac Games, Interactive Associates, Take 2 Interactive, VoiceWorks Productions, and WB Games. The strike sought repayment and resolution for all voice actor work in games that started production after February 17, 2015. Of the 11 officially struck companies, Interactive Associates have not released a game in recent years and was dissolved in 2002, and Corps of Discovery Films have not released a game since 2008. SAG-AFTRA's strike was supported by the American Federation of Labor and Congress of Industrial Organizations, the Actors' Equity Association, the British Actors' Equity Association, the Alliance of Canadian Cinema, Television and Radio Artists (ACTRA), the Australian Media, Entertainment and Arts Alliance, and Equity New Zealand, who requested that their members not take any of the acting work that was open due to the striking actors. Voice actors that have spoken in favor of the union and the strike include Jennifer Hale, David Hayter, Elias Toufexis, Phil LaMarr and Wil Wheaton.

The first picket began on October 24, 2016 in Playa Vista, California against Electronic Arts. Additional picketing lines occurred at the Los Angeles headquarters for WB Games and Insomniac Games over the month of November. These picket lines were joined by members of the American Federation of Musicians, the Writers Guild of America, the International Alliance of Theatrical Stage Employees, the International Brotherhood of Teamsters and UNITE HERE, and drew between 300 and 400 people each. More than 500 people participated in a rally march from the SAG-AFTRA headquarters to a park near the La Brea Tar Pits to support the strike. In addition to physical picketing of the various industry companies, SAG-AFTRA encouraged its members to use virtual picketing by engaging with their fans on Twitter and other social media under the hashtag, "#PerformanceMatters".

In response to the strike, the affected companies launched a website to inform the SAG-AFTRA members and the public what the state of negotiations were to demonstrate that they were trying to bargain but had been refused by the union. On this site, the companies stated that their proposed payments would be an upfront system and guaranteed regardless of how well a video game sold, making it a better deal for actors. They also noted that they had agreed to terms to split "vocally stressful" sessions from four-hour blocks into two two-hour ones, as long as actors could complete both within a week, but this proposal was rejected by the union. The companies further criticized the union for not bringing its proposed offers to a vote to its members before calling the strike. Union attorneys demanded the public relations firm Singer Associates, which set up the website on behalf of the game companies, to stop using their trademarks, citing potential confusion.

== 2017 agreement ==
On September 23, 2017, SAG-AFTRA and the video game companies came to an agreement, effectively ending the strike. The agreement crafted a new three-year contract with the companies to start after ratification by SAG-AFTRA's board of directors, expected to occur within a few weeks from the agreement. The agreement does not include residuals as SAG-AFTRA sought for, but does include a sliding-scale bonus payment for each recording session a voice actor participates in, starting at $75 for the first session, up to $2,100 for ten or more sessions. Keythe Farley, the chair of the SAG-AFTRA negotiations committee, said that these payments "are significantly larger now than what we had 11 months ago" and praised the new structure. Video game companies must provide additional transparencies for roles voice actors are to perform under the new terms; while they do not need to name the game or character to maintain confidentiality when offering roles, companies must provide actors with project code names, gameplay genre, if the work is based on an existing franchise or character, and whether the work will include profanity, racial slurs, obscure technology terms, sexual or violent content, or physical stunts. The agreement also will have SAG-AFTRA and the video game companies continue to work on addressing issues related to vocal stress within recording sessions.

Voice actors expressed several concerns with the agreement, believing SAG-AFTRA conceded too much to the video game companies. Predominantly, the failure to negotiate a residual payment model was cited as an issue. Actors and some video game producers believe that without a residual-type payment system, the current approach keeps participation in the video game industry extremely different from other traditional forms of media. Also of concern was that the agreement contained no specific terms in regards to the vocal stress aspects of the union's complaint. Given the proliferation of struck studios readily using non-union voice actors at higher rates than their union terms during the strike, many guild members feared that SAG-AFTRA was not sufficiently committed to supporting voice actors in the video game industry, which comprise a small portion of the union's total membership.

The tentative agreement was approved unanimously by SAG-AFTRA's board of directors on October 9, 2017, sending the issue to member vote. The vote was completed on November 7, 2017, and 90% of the 10% that voted approved the agreement. A new three-year agreement subsequently went into effect on November 8, 2017. The agreement was extended for a further two years in 2020 to November 2022.

== Impact ==
By the end of 2016, it was unclear how much of an effect the strike had on the video game industry, as none of the companies struck had reported delays of upcoming titles due to the lack of voice actors. SAG-AFTRA noted that they had only targeted strike actions against a subset of the industry, and other publishers and developers would not be affected by their action. Union president Gabrielle Carteris said that with the production time cycle for video games, immediate effects of the strike would not be easily seen, anticipating the strike to last for a long time. In the interim, they are working to craft amenable contracts with other developers and producers that they have not struck. By May 2017, SAG-AFTRA stated that it had already signed twenty other companies for thirty games under their alternate contract for low-production titles, with "new deals are being signed every week".

One of the first reported effects of the strike was the prequel Life Is Strange: Before the Storm, which had its first episode released on August 31, 2017. Actress Ashly Burch, a member of SAG-AFTRA who voiced Chloe Price in the original game, was unable to reprise her voice role due to the strike and was replaced by Rhianna DeVries; she remained onboard to consult on the character for the game. However, with the strike concluded, Burch was able to return to voice Chloe in an additional episode for Before the Storm produced after the strike's resolution. In a separate case, Giant Sparrow had approached filmmaker John Carpenter to provide narrative voice work for a section of What Remains of Edith Finch, modeled after Carpenter's Tales from the Crypt. The strike prevented Carpenter from participating in this manner, so he instead allowed the studio to license his iconic Halloween theme for the section.

Kotaku reported some game developers were critical of the actors' demands in relation to their work compensation. It also caused accusations between actors, with Felicia Day calling DeVries a "scab" in a tweet that she later deleted. PCGamesN noted that Burch did not resent the producers as she still worked on the game as a story consultant.

It was the first such organized strike within the video game industry and the first voice actor strike in 17 years, as well as the first strike within the merged SAG-AFTRA organization. As of April 26, 2017, it is the longest strike within SAG, surpassing both the 95-day 1980 Emmy Awards strike, as well as the 180-day 2000 commercials strike.

Other members of SAG-AFTRA, and other entertainment workers' unions, looked to the voice actor strike as a possible point in their favor during pending contract renegotiations, in light of how many entertainment industries are transitioning towards digital and streaming media; notably, the main SAG-AFTRA contract for film and television industries is due to expire in June 2017, and the solidarity behind the video game voice actors could be used as leverage in these negotiations. SAG-AFTRA and the film and television producers were able to reach a negotiated agreement for new terms in early July, preventing a possible strike action.

The video game industry itself has not had any type of trade union concept due to its origins in the tech sector and the white-collar nature of the industry, though there have been some efforts towards forming such unions. The voice actor strike had reengaged discussions about unionization of video game programmers and developers.
