= 2023 Writers Guild of America strike =

American media labor dispute

- Part of 2023 Hollywood labor disputes
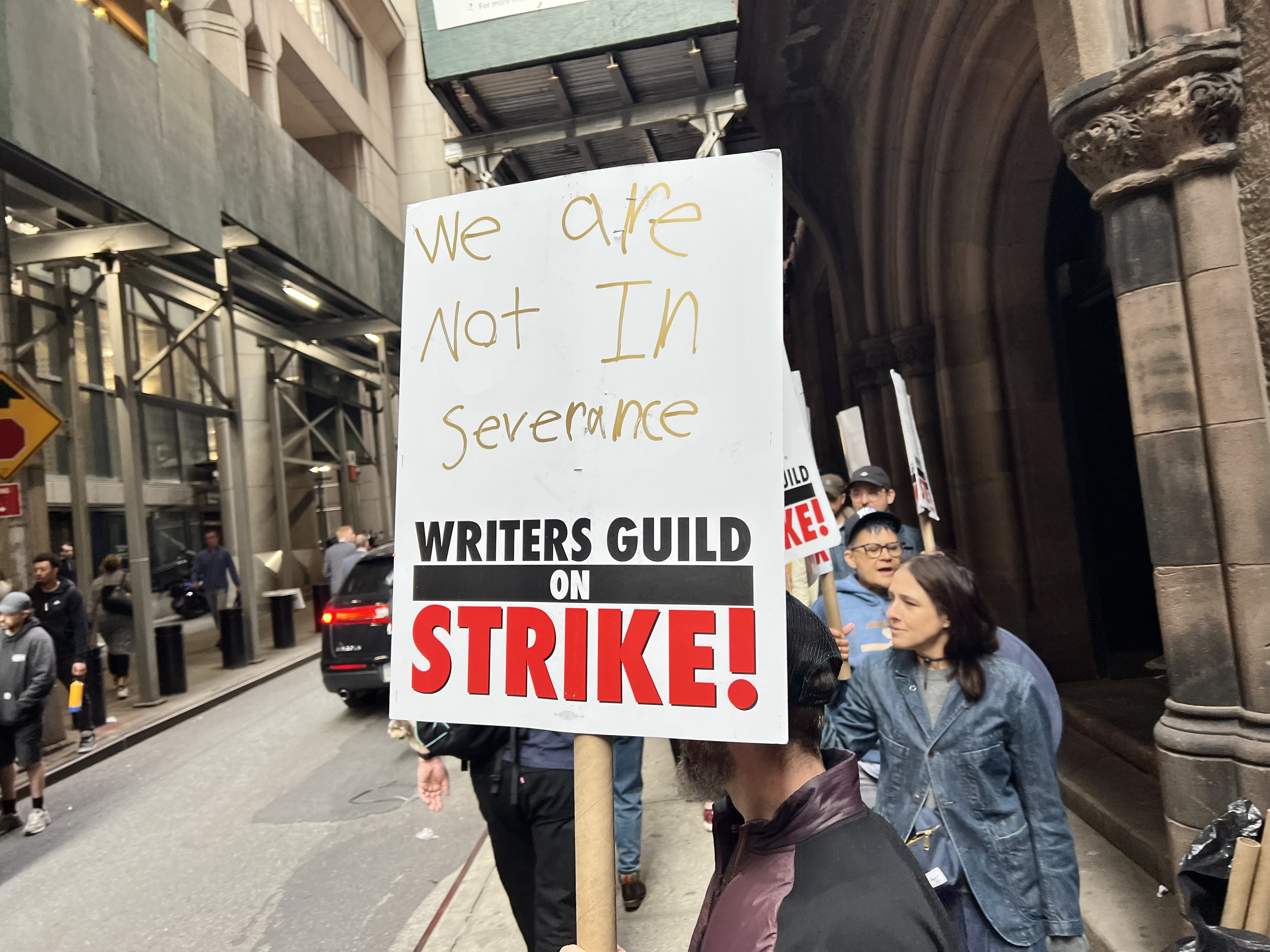
- Picket line formed by writers on strike in New York City on location of Daredevil: Born Again. The production of Severance was similarly shut down due to the strike.
- Date: May 2 – September 27, 2023 (4 months and 25 days; 147 days)
- Location: United States; Primarily New York City, Los Angeles, Burbank, and Culver City (Note: Smaller but notable strike action took place in other film and television hubs like Chicago and Atlanta, as well as cities close to the major production hubs like Santa Clarita, California.)
- Caused by: Lack of agreement on a new contract between the WGA and AMPTP; Poor compensation for writers via residuals with the advent of streaming media
- Goals: Increase funding and job security for writers; Increase the size of writers' rooms; Limit the use of artificial intelligence in the writing process
- Methods: Strike action; Work stoppage; Picketing
- Result: Tentative agreement reached on September 24, 2023; contract ratified on October 9, 2023.

Parties
| Writers Guild of America: Writers Guild of America West; Writers Guild of America, East | Alliance of Motion Picture and Television Producers |

From May 2 to September 27, 2023, the Writers Guild of America (WGA)—representing 11,500 screenwriters—went on strike over a labor dispute with the Alliance of Motion Picture and Television Producers (AMPTP). Lasting 148 days, the strike is tied with the 1960 strike as the second-longest labor stoppage actioned by the WGA, only behind the 1988 strike (153 days). Alongside the 2023 SAG-AFTRA strike, which lasted between July and November, it was part of a series of broader Hollywood labor disputes. Both strikes contributed to the biggest interruption to the American film and television industries since the COVID-19 pandemic.

The strike caused significant economic impact: some studios halted ongoing or future productions or reduced some staff, while certain production agreements were jeopardized as some studios were able to use force majeure clauses to terminate those agreements. Strike action also affected other areas of the entertainment ecosystem, including the VFX industry and prop making studios.

After a tentative agreement, union leadership voted to end the strike starting from September 27, 2023. On October 9, the WGA membership officially ratified the contract with 99% of WGA members voting in favor of it. The WGA secured increases to minimum wage, final compensation, pension and health fund rates, improvements to terms related to length of employment and size of writing teams, and increases to residual payments for domestic and foreign streaming works. The union also secured regulation of artificial intelligence (AI), prohibiting exploitation of writers' material to train AI models, produce digital recreations, and efforts to use AI to reduce writers or their pay.

== Issues in the strike ==
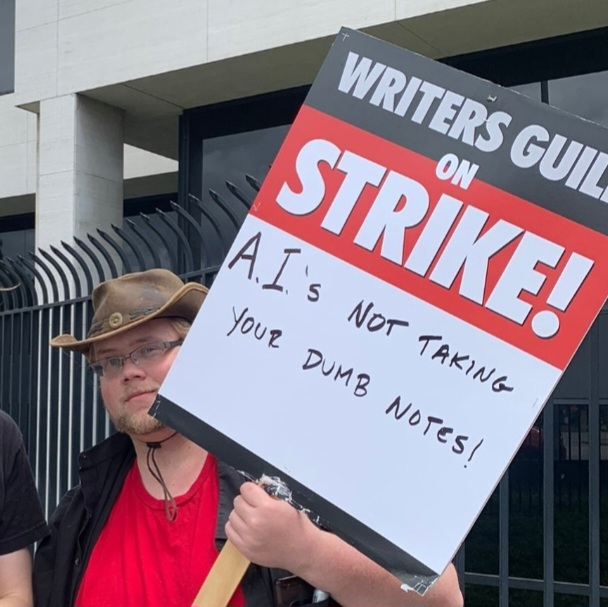
A picketer protesting against replacing writers with generative AI

One of the main points of disagreement between the writers and the producers was the residuals from streaming media; the WGA claimed that the AMPTP's share of such residuals had cut much of the writers' average incomes compared to a decade prior. Writers also wanted strict and harsh limits on generative artificial intelligence, such as ChatGPT. They were willing to concede that writers themselves may have uses for such technology, but they demanded that the Agreement state that genAI would not be used to replace writers.

The COVID-19 pandemic and its aftermath saw major reductions in the workforce and cancellations of multiple film and television projects to save money on basic residuals and music licensing costs, though Apple and Amazon remained outliers. The ensuing fall of "Peak TV" worsened conditions for all filmmaking workers, but due to their roles in development and pre-production, the first two steps in the filmmaking process, writers were hit fastest.

On May 2, 2020, the latest Minimum Basic Agreement (MBA) became the collective bargaining agreement that covered most of the work done by WGA writers. The Minimum Basic Agreement was an agreement that established a minimum wage for television and film writers. In television, the Minimum Basic Agreement only applied to those who wrote for broadcast television shows and not for streaming television. This was very clear when comparing late-night talk shows that were produced for broadcast television, such as The Late Show with Stephen Colbert by CBS, versus The Problem with Jon Stewart, produced for streaming by Apple TV+. The writers who worked for The Problem were not covered by the MBA and therefore had to negotiate individually with the streaming company for their pay, and as a result, they were paid less than writers who wrote for The Late Show while doing the same amount of work. This pattern held true with other shows in the two categories. The MBA expired on May 1, 2023.

The WGA estimated that its proposals would yield writers about US$429 million a year, whereas the AMPTP's offer would yield $86 million.

One disputed issue is the Guild wanting requirements for "mandatory staffing" and "duration of employment" terms to be added to their contract, which would require all shows to be staffed with a minimum number of writers for a minimum amount of time, "whether needed or not" per the AMPTP.

Another important proposal that the WGA is advocating for is to ensure each member of a writing team receives their own pension and their own health care funds. The AMPTP rejected this proposal and did not offer a counterproposal. At the same time, there was a tentative agreement between the WGA and AMPTP to have 0.5% of negotiated minimums for all WGA minimums shifted into pensions and health funds.

== Timeline of negotiations and strike activity ==
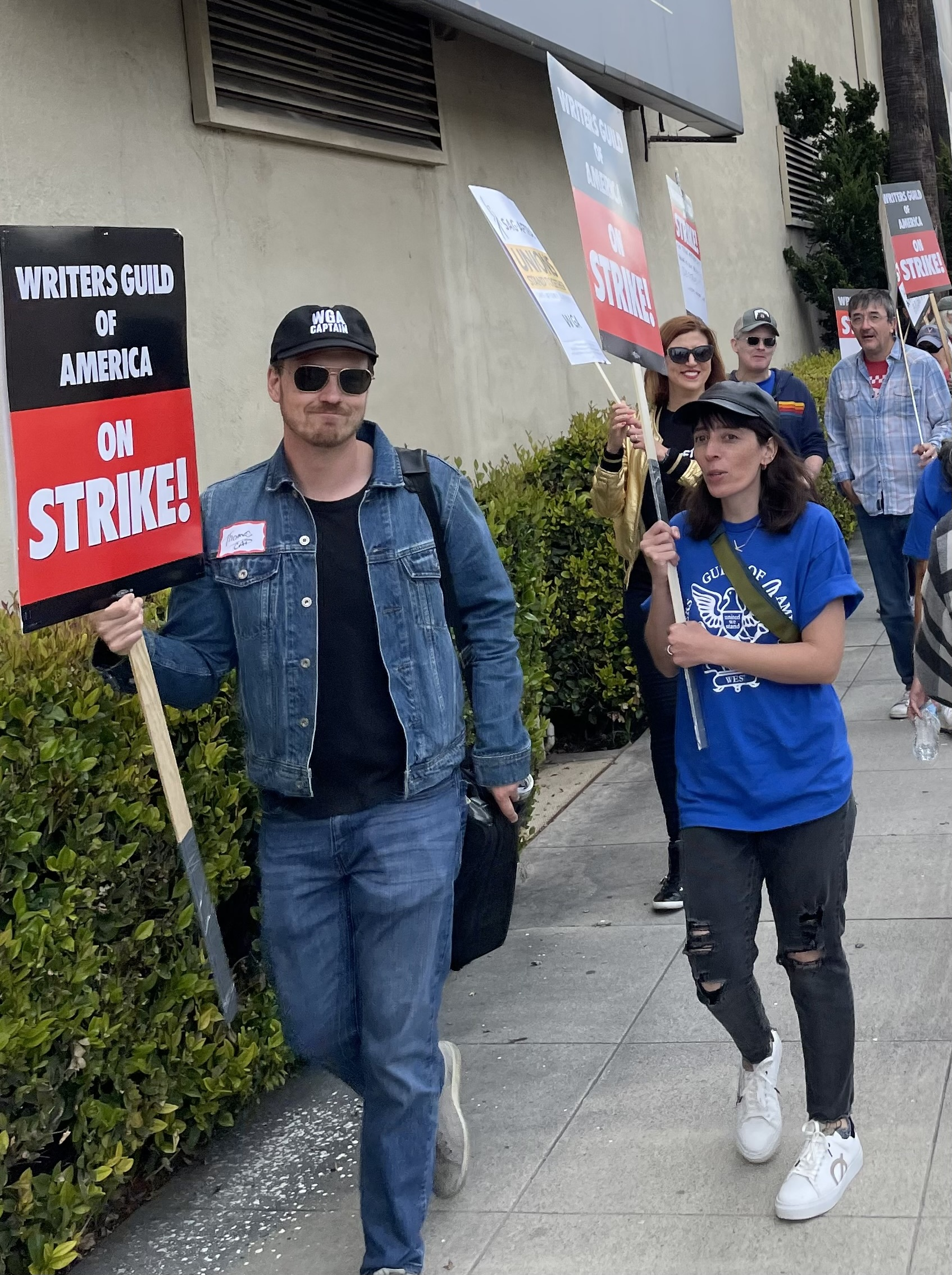
A strike captain leads WGA strikers outside Warner Bros. Studios.

=== April 2023 ===
On April 18, 2023, 97.85% of members of the Writers Guild of America (WGA) voted to go on strike if they failed to reach a satisfactory agreement with the Alliance of Motion Picture and Television Producers (AMPTP), which represents the major film and television studios in Hollywood, by May 1. The AMPTP engaged in lengthy negotiations with the WGA on behalf of Amazon Studios (as well as MGM Holdings), Apple Studios, Lionsgate, NBCUniversal, Netflix, Paramount Global, Sony Pictures, the Walt Disney Company, and Warner Bros. Discovery (WBD), but failed to reach a deal before the mandated deadline.

=== May 2023 ===
As a result, the leadership of the Writers Guild of America, West (WGAW) and Writers Guild of America, East (WGAE) unanimously approved a strike on the eve of May 2, the first of its kind since the 2007–2008 strike fifteen years prior.

The Hollywood Reporter reported that the WGA had set some prospective rules for writers during the strike. The Writers Guild stated that "writers cannot do any writing, revising, pitching, or discussing future projects with companies that are members of the AMPTP."

The Writers Guild also stated that fiction podcasts that are produced by companies against which the Guild and its members are striking must stop production. The Guild said that they hoped that writers of animated series not covered by the Writers Guild but by the Animation Guild would seek advice from the Writers Guild on whether or not their work as a writer was counter to the activities of the strike and, if so, to cease such work for the duration of the strike. The Guild noted that while they cannot punish non-Guild writers who write for companies against which the union is striking, they promise to bar such writers from future Guild membership.

The WGA instructed members to begin picketing on May 2, 2023, at 1:00 p.m. PDT. Some places that the WGA has picketed include AMC Networks, Amazon/Culver Studios, MGM, CBS Radford, CBS Television City, Disney, 20th Century Studios, Lionsgate, Starz, Netflix, Paramount, MTV, Sony, Universal, Warner Bros. (including its Burbank division), 30 Rock/NBCUniversal, Broadway Stages, HBO, Silvercup Studios, Steiner Studios, Warner Bros. Discovery, and Warner Bros. Discovery Upfront.

During the strike, the WGA instructed writers facing financial hardship due to the strike to apply to the Entertainment Community Fund. The Entertainment Community Fund helps people in the entertainment industry with financial trouble find affordable housing and maintain health care and senior care coverage. On May 10, 2023, it was reported that writers had pledged $1.7 million to the Entertainment Community Fund. Among the prominent donors were showrunners and producers J. J. Abrams, Greg Berlanti, Adam McKay, Ryan Murphy, Shonda Rhimes, Michael Schur, and John Wells.

=== June 2023 ===
On June 7 and 8, 2023, picketing in the Northeast (namely in New York) was paused due to poor air quality from the 2023 Canadian wildfires. Strike activity resumed on the 9th when air quality improved.

On June 9, 2023, Lionsgate suspended BMF line producer Ian Woolf following an altercation with striking writers who were picketing outside of BMF's production headquarters. According to first-hand accounts from writers Gabriel Alejandro Garza and Tom Smuts, Woolf attempted to intimidate Garza and Brian Egeston, who were picketing on the sidewalk next to the studio's entrance, by accelerating his car towards them and stopping just short of hitting them. After first claiming that he did not see them, Woolf later admitted to trying to scare them. According to Smuts, Woolf later unsuccessfully tried to convince Teamsters Local 728 to cross picket lines, but they refused. Lionsgate released a statement saying, "We take acts of intimidation and threats of violence seriously and investigate them thoroughly... As we continue to investigate, we have sent home the individual involved." The WGA also released a statement, which read, "Workers should not be threatened with physical harm when exercising their right to publicly protest and picket against unfair wages and working conditions."

=== July 2023 ===
On July 12, 2023, Deadline Hollywood reported that the AMPTP and the major Hollywood studios did not plan to return to negotiations with the WGA until late October 2023 at the earliest. The studio executives who anonymously spoke with Deadline stated that by October, many writers would be financially strained to the point where they would lose their housing, which they believed would allow them to be in a better position to dictate the terms of any new deal. Representatives for the AMPTP distanced themselves from the anonymous sources, claiming they remained committed to signing a deal as soon as possible.

=== August 2023 ===
On August 1, 2023, the WGA announced that it would meet with the AMPTP on the following Friday to discuss negotiations regarding the strike. The location of the meeting was not disclosed. A spokesman for the AMPTP, speaking in relation to the strikes of the WGA and SAG-AFTRA, said, "we remain committed to finding a path to mutually beneficial deals with both unions." Both parties met on August 4, 2023, but no agreement was reached.

On August 10, 2023, the AMPTP and the WGA agreed to resume contract negotiations, with the first meeting set for August 11. After that meeting, the Writers Guild sent a note to its 11,500 members saying the AMPTP had indicated a willingness to make concessions in some areas, including finding ways to safeguard writers from artificial intelligence technology. The note added, however, that the AMPTP had said studios "were not willing to engage" on other Writers Guild proposals, including success-based residual payments from streaming services. The note said guild leaders would not return to negotiations until studios were willing to engage on all proposals. Later on the same day the WGA sent a message to members saying that they had received a counterproposal and were evaluating it.

On August 21, 2023, picketing was canceled in Los Angeles due to Hurricane Hilary. The union, meanwhile, remained relatively silent beyond the message of August 18, 2023: "Everybody is trying to step up and make a resolution," one executive told THR. "There's more positive momentum this week than last." On August 22, 2023, AMPTP presented a proposal suggesting rules for AI content, but talks between the studios and the writers remained at a stalemate until late September. On August 30, California State Treasurer Fiona Ma sent letters to Netflix, The Walt Disney Company, Comcast, Warner Bros. Discovery, Apple Inc., Paramount Global and Amazon, telling them to return to negotiations and settle the strikes. She states that the impact of the strikes "paralyzes Hollywood and reverberates across the state, affecting countless businesses, thousands of pension fund beneficiaries, and millions of Californians."

=== September 2023 ===
On September 6, Warner Bros. suspended deals with Mindy Kaling, J. J. Abrams, Greg Berlanti, and Bill Lawrence. It had announced the day before that the strikes would impact its 2023 earnings by $500 million.

On September 8, the WGA released a statement claiming that there are member companies that have shown a "desire and willingness to negotiate an agreement that adequately addresses writers' issues... [and who] have said they are willing to negotiate on proposals that the AMPTP has presented to the public as deal breakers," and that they have asked them to leave the AMPTP in order to negotiate independently with the WGA. A few hours later, the AMPTP released a statement refuting that claim, saying, "The AMPTP member companies are aligned and are negotiating together to reach a resolution. Any suggestion to the contrary is false."

On September 11, 2023, The Drew Barrymore Show resumed episodes without writers and was picketed by guild members. Two audience members were turned away for wearing WGA pins. Barrymore would be removed as host of the upcoming 74th National Book Awards the following day. On September 17, Barrymore changed her decision and announced that the show would remain on hiatus while the strike was ongoing.

On September 12, in an interview with TheWrap, a studio executive said that "the showrunners are quite pissed [...] they are mad at the guilds and feel that they are not responding to the studios' offer. Now even the higher-paid members of the guild are expressing concern over the inability to end the strike." In addition, while there were plans for a meeting between the WGA and top showrunners on September 15, the meeting was cancelled on that day due to plans for an upcoming meeting between the WGA and AMPTP the following week.

On September 13, American comedian and political commentator Bill Maher announced on Twitter that he will resume production of his show Real Time with Bill Maher. However, on September 18, Maher changed his mind, stating: "My decision to return to work was made when it seemed nothing was happening and there was no end in sight to this strike. Now that both sides have agreed to go back to the negotiating table I'm going to delay the return of Real Time, for now, and hope they can finally get this done." Earlier in September, he suggested that the Governor of California Gavin Newsom should help end the strike.

On September 14, the AMPTP said that the WGA met with them the previous day and agreed to restart negotiations the following week. A few minutes after the news, the WGA confirmed this. Four days later, it was announced that the union and studios would resume negotiations on September 20 with studio CEOs David Zaslav (Warner Bros. Discovery), Bob Bakish (Paramount), Bob Iger (Disney), Donna Langley (NBCUniversal), and Ted Sarandos (Netflix). This meeting was followed by more meetings on September 21, 22, and 23. Finally, the writers and the studios reached a tentative agreement on September 24, and on September 26, following a vote, the union leadership announced that the strike would officially end. The strike ended on September 27 at 12:01 a.m. PDT.

=== October 2023 ===
On October 9, the WGA membership officially ratified the deal, with 99% of WGA members voting in favor of the new contract.

== WGA negotiating committee ==
The WGA announced the members of its negotiating committee in November 2022, with David Young as chief negotiator. In February 2023, Ellen Stutzman took over as the chief negotiator of the WGA.

- John August
- Angelina Burnett
- Kay Cannon
- Yahlin Chang
- Robb Chavis
- Adam Conover
- Travis Donnelly
- Ashley Gable
- David A. Goodman (co-chair)
- Hallie Haglund
- Eric Haywood
- Eric Heisserer
- Greg Iwinski
- Chris Keyser (co-chair)
- Luvh Rakhe
- Erica Saleh
- Danielle Sanchez-Witzel
- James Schamus
- Tom Schulman
- Michael Schur
- David Shore
- David Simon
- Patric Verrone
- Nicole Yorkin

== Productions impacted ==
Many films, television programs, and podcasts were affected by the strike; some continued production without writers, while others were paused or completely shut down. Unaffected projects were either already written before May 2, were largely unscripted, or relied on non-union staff.

Other projects with completed scripts were postponed or canceled due to the union's use of picket lines to disrupt those productions.

== Response ==
=== Actors during the WGA strike ===
SAG-AFTRA president Fran Drescher and executive vice president Ben Whitehair picketed with the WGA in May. A significant number of other actors also joined the picket lines or otherwise expressed support for the WGA strike.

Drew Barrymore withdrew from hosting the 2023 MTV Movie & TV Awards in support of the WGA strike, and Jennifer Coolidge, Joseph Quinn, and Pedro Pascal expressed support for the strike in their pre-recorded speeches during the ceremony. Seth Meyers spoke in support of the strike during the "Corrections" segment on Late Night with Seth Meyers a few days before the strike began. Jeopardy! host Mayim Bialik similarly left during the show's last week of filming (for season 39), though production continued with Ken Jennings as host. The strike was also discussed at the Cannes Film Festival press conferences, with Sean Penn, Ethan Hawke, Paul Dano, and Kathleen Kennedy expressing their support. Snoop Dogg spoke in support of the strike during a panel at the Milken Institute and drew parallels with payout conflicts between music artists and music streaming platforms. Talk show hosts Stephen Colbert, Jimmy Fallon, Jimmy Kimmel, Seth Meyers, and John Oliver began a limited podcast called Strike Force Five to support their out-of-work staff during the strike.

=== Elected officials ===
Several elected officials supported the strike and appeared on their picket lines:

- Konstantine Anthony, Mayor of Burbank, California and SAG-AFTRA member
- Laura Friedman, member of California's 44th State Assembly district
- Adam Schiff, representative from California's 30th congressional district

Both Mayor of Los Angeles Karen Bass and Governor of California Gavin Newsom offered to help mediate an end to the strikes.

=== Other unions ===
In a statement made on April 18, 2023, the Directors Guild of America (DGA) president, Lesli Linka Glatter told the members of the Guild that there is nothing the union could do to force members back to work if a WGA strike were to happen. However, she also noted that if DGA members do not perform their "DGA covered services," they could be let go from their current positions.

Ahead of the strike, the International Brotherhood of Teamsters Local 399 issued an advisory to members instructing Teamsters not to strike but informing them that they are protected by the Teamsters contract if they refuse to cross picket lines. At a WGA rally on May 3, 2023, Lindsay Dougherty, the leader of Teamsters Local 399, said that while the Teamsters could not strike in solidarity due to a contract in place through 2024, she affirmed that Local 399 would not cross picket lines, saying, "Every single truck that we know of has not crossed."

On May 2, 2023, The Animation Guild, IATSE Local 839 made a statement of support for the Writers Guild and their strike. Along with this statement, they produced a Question and Answer document to help Animation Guild members figure out how the Writers' Strike impacts their ability to maintain solidarity with the members of the Writers Guild.

Ahead of the strike, International Alliance of Theatrical Stage Employees president Matthew Loeb informed its members of their rights to honor a picket line and that in many places their contracts "expressly" allow employees to honor lawful picket lines.

On April 30, SAG-AFTRA advised its members that while they should continue working on active projects to avoid breach of contract claims, it encouraged members to show solidarity by walking picket lines during non-working hours and posting on social media. The union also advised writers "You should not write anything normally written by striking WGA writers."

==== Foreign unions ====
The Writers' Guild of Great Britain (WGGB), based in the United Kingdom, announced its support for the strike and instructed its members to refrain from working on American projects during the duration of the strike. The Australian Writers' Guild, Writers Guild of Canada, Screenwriters Guild of Israel, the Writers Guild of Ireland, and the Writers Guild of Sweden followed suit. Solidarity statements in support of the strike were issued by Writers Guild Italia and La Guilde française des scénaristes, although the Guilde stopped short of discouraging members from working on American projects during the strike.

=== Film and television executives ===
On May 3, 2023, the second day of the strike, The Walt Disney Company (through its ABC Signature Studios unit) sent a letter written by the studios' Assistant Chief Counsel Bob McPhail on behalf of the executives at Disney to showrunners and all other writer-producers who work for the company, saying that they must report back to work and perform their non-writer duties. Producers are expected to do what are known as "a through h" services, like cutting for time, making small changes to dialogue or narration, and "changes in technical or stage directions."

On May 4, 2023, on the Q1 earnings call for Paramount, CEO Bob Bakish addressed the strike, saying that writers were "an essential part of creating content" and that he hoped there could be "a resolution that works for everyone fairly quickly". Bakish also stated that the company had been planning for an extended strike and shared that the company's strategy to outlast the writers' strike is to use its large streaming library located within Paramount+, the upcoming summer movie slate, which will move to the streaming service, and productions that will be completed offshore.

On July 11, 2023, Deadline Hollywood reported that the Alliance of Motion Picture and Television Producers was seeking to use a "divide and conquer" approach among the different Hollywood unions, including the WGA. The article said that the AMPTP would not negotiate with the WGA until October at the earliest and quoted one studio executive as saying, "The endgame is to allow things to drag on until union members start losing their apartments and losing their houses." The article and quote received attention and backlash from both Hollywood outlets, such as Entertainment Tonight, and non-Hollywood outlets, such as Vanity Fair and the New York Daily News. When asked about the guild's demands for staffing minimums and guaranteed employment periods, AMPTP president Carol Lombardini responded by saying that "writers are lucky to have term employment."

AMC Theatres CEO Adam Aron said of the WGA strike that only a prolonged strike lasting many months would impact the theater chain and that most of the movies to be released in 2023 and 2024 have already been written and even filmed.

Warner Bros. Discovery CEO and president David Zaslav said that WBD and other Hollywood studios were "not glad" that the WGA strike had occurred and that the company was working to resolve the strike and compensate writers fairly.

=== Strikebreaking efforts ===
During the strike, several celebrities announced a desire to strikebreak by resuming to film or promote amidst ongoing negotiations. However, they all ultimately changed their minds after public backlash.

- In July 2023, Canadian actor Stephen Amell said he did not support striking at a fan convention, calling the strike a "reductive negotiating tactic" and "myopic". Amell apologized for what he said in an Instagram post and attended a New York City picket line.
- On September 10, 2023, The Drew Barrymore Show announced it would resume filming. The WGA East condemned the action as violation of the WGA strike rules. Several days later, Drew Barrymore released an apology video on Instagram, saying, "I deeply apologize to writers. I deeply apologize to unions." Co-head writer of The Drew Barrymore Show, Chelsea White, one of those who picketed the series on September 12, said that when any production covered under WGA comes back "during a strike it undermines our whole group effort to come to a fair contract with the AMPTP." On September 17, Barrymore said that she would be halting production of the show.
- On September 11, 2023, both The Jennifer Hudson Show and The Talk were reported to be planning to resume filming, with The Talk being confirmed two days later with a rehearsal filmed that same day. Hours after it was announced that The Drew Barrymore Show was suspending production, both The Jennifer Hudson Show and The Talk would separately announce that they were suspending production.
- On September 13, 2023, Bill Maher announced that Real Time with Bill Maher would resume filming. The WGA condemned the action in a statement, stating "Bill Maher's decision to go back on the air while his Guild is on strike is disappointing. If he goes forward with his plan, he needs to honor more than 'the spirit of the strike'. Bill Maher is obligated as a WGA member to follow the strike rules and not perform any writing services. It is difficult to imagine how Real Time with Bill Maher can go forward without a violation of WGA strike rules taking place. WGA will be picketing this show." Maher had previously called the demands by the WGA "kooky." On September 18, Maher said that he is going "to delay the return of Real Time, for now."

== See also ==
- List of Hollywood strikes
  - 1960 Writers Guild of America strike
  - 1981 Writers Guild of America strike
  - 2007–08 Writers Guild of America strike
- Impact of the COVID-19 pandemic on television in the United States
