= 1981 Writers Guild of America strike =

Television writers' strike

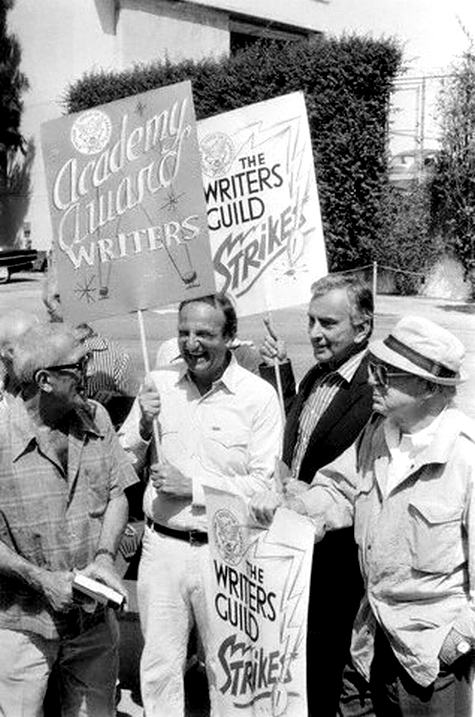
Richard Brooks, Bo Goldman, Gore Vidal and Billy Wilder picketing in Los Angeles

The 1981 Writers Guild of America strike was a 3-month strike action taken to establish compensation in the then-new markets of "pay TV" and home video by 8,500 Writers Guild of America members. The strike lasted 92 days, beginning on April 11, 1981, and ending on July 12, 1981. While the release of theatrical movies was mostly unaffected due to production companies stockpiling scripts, most scripted television series started much later than originally planned. The strike resulted in renegotiated wages towards writers, actors, and directors.

== Formation ==
After the Writer's Guild's contract with 20th Century Fox expired in early 1981, negotiations for their next contract remained stagnant for longer than expected. The union told the National Labor Relations Board that the producers were not bargaining in new faith, and the two sides were unable to come to an agreement, particularly regarding the profits from the rising industry of home video sales and TV broadcast programming.

The strike officially began on April 11, 1981, when the Writers Guild of America voted to start picketing outside 20th Century Fox Studios. This was likely inspired by recent strikes throughout the industry, such as the 1980 actors strike, which successfully raised similar concerns and demands regarding home media sales.

== Negotiated Terms ==
After thirteen weeks of striking, a settlement was reached between the Writers Guild and producers. Writers would receive increasing payment over the four-year term of the next contract, in addition to a 1.2% cut of revenue received from paid TV programming. The strike also strongly affected jobs even outside the writers who were striking, such as agreed wage increases for directors and actors of live programming.

== See also ==
- List of Hollywood strikes
  - 1960 Writers Guild of America strike
  - 1988 Writers Guild of America strike
  - 2007–08 Writers Guild of America strike
  - 2023 Writers Guild of America strike
