= 2000 commercial actors strike =

United States union strike

A nationwide strike by the members of the American Screen Actors Guild and the American Federation of Television and Radio Artists against the American Association of Advertising Agencies began on May 1, 2000, and ended on October 30, 2000.

== Background ==
At the time, SAG and AFTRA represented a total of approximately 135,000 actors who were paid US$720 million in 1999 for their work in the advertising industry. However, the average SAG member was making less than $7,000 per year despite having to pay many related costs out of pocket, and most SAG members had other jobs that provided the majority of their income.

Unionized actors had been paid by a residuals system for network television since the 1950s. This system provided actors with payment every time the commercial aired. However, this system was not extended to cable television; a union actor received US$1,000 for their appearance in a cable ad no matter how many times it aired. This discrepancy was a sticking point for both advertising firms and acting unions. Consequently, a group of commercial actors and members of SAG specifically lobbied William Daniels to run as union President in order to ensure leadership support for negotiations on advertising fees. With an approaching expiration of the existing contract for commercial acting, the unions and advertisers both came to the table with a mind to reconcile the discrepancy between systems: advertisers proposing a flat fee to replace the residuals system on network TV, and unions pushing for an extension of the residuals system to cable TV.

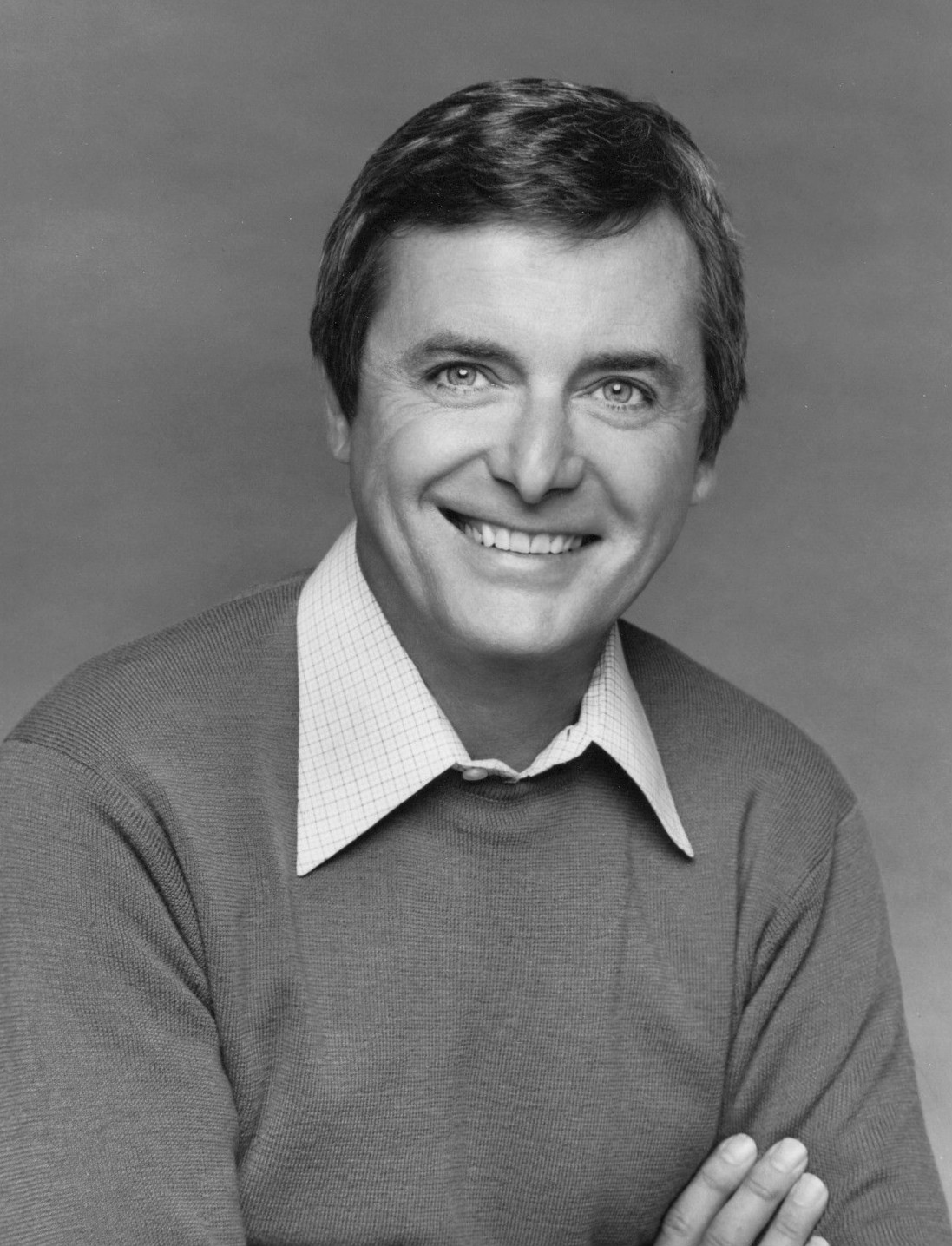
William Daniels, president of SAG during the strike

The two sides met several times prior to strikes, including with the guidance of a federal mediator, but stalled on a deal over the main points of negotiation. The SAG and AFTRA boards voted unanimously (150–0) for a strike.

== Negotiation process ==
At the start of the strike, the two unions offered any advertisers who agreed to their contract terms the option of signing a waiver which would allow them to continue working with unionized actors. However, no advertising agencies accepted the offer immediately.

The strike surpassed the 1988 strike by the Writers Guild of America in length on October 2 and became the longest work stoppage to have taken place in Hollywood at the time. The length of the strike caused directors to hire "scabs" to continue producing commercials. These non-unionized were used in commercials for Procter & Gamble, which led the unions to call for a consumer boycott of the company's products that was supported by entertainment industry figures such as Susan Sarandon, Bryan Cranston, and Tim Robbins. The extraordinary length also caused financial hardships for some striking actors and those working in the industry.

Procter & Gamble, the second largest advertiser in the US at the time, was said to be instrumental in helping secure the final deal, which secured the continuation of the residuals system for commercials on network television. A demand by unions to extend the residuals system (also referred to as pay-per-play) to ads airing on cable television ultimately failed. The final agreement also included a provision that advertisers and union actors could freely negotiate contracts for internet ads, a relatively young industry at the time. Minimum pay for contracts was increased by more than 10% across the board.

== Aftermath and legacy ==
The unions prevailed and were able to defeat the major rollbacks employers sought as well as achieve gains including increasing performers' earnings in cable advertisements. When the deal was announced on October 23, 2000, it included preserving the pay-per-play model in Class A Network commercials and grew cable payments to performers by 140%. A reported 41% gain in performers' commercial earnings from 2000 to 2005, for a gross of $750 million, was reported by Gary Epp, a member of the SAG negotiating team. To date the commercial earnings of the now-merged unions, SAG-AFTRA, remain the highest grossing contract for the performers union.

During the negotiation process, some non-union actors broke the strike lines, enabling advertisers to continue limited commercial production. Sara Kreiger, a union member who served as strike captain in New York, cited this as enabling a long term move towards non-union actors among advertisers.

In 2020, USA Today ranked the strike as the 6th largest in American history and estimated it cost 17,280,000 job-days.

SAG and AFTRA later merged into a single union, and the combined union's website contains only a small reference to the strike on their history page, saying "May 1: SAG & AFTRA joint commercial strike begins, and will officially end October 30th. It is the guild’s 8th strike and AFTRA’s 4th national strike."
