= Equity card =

Membership card of Actors Equity

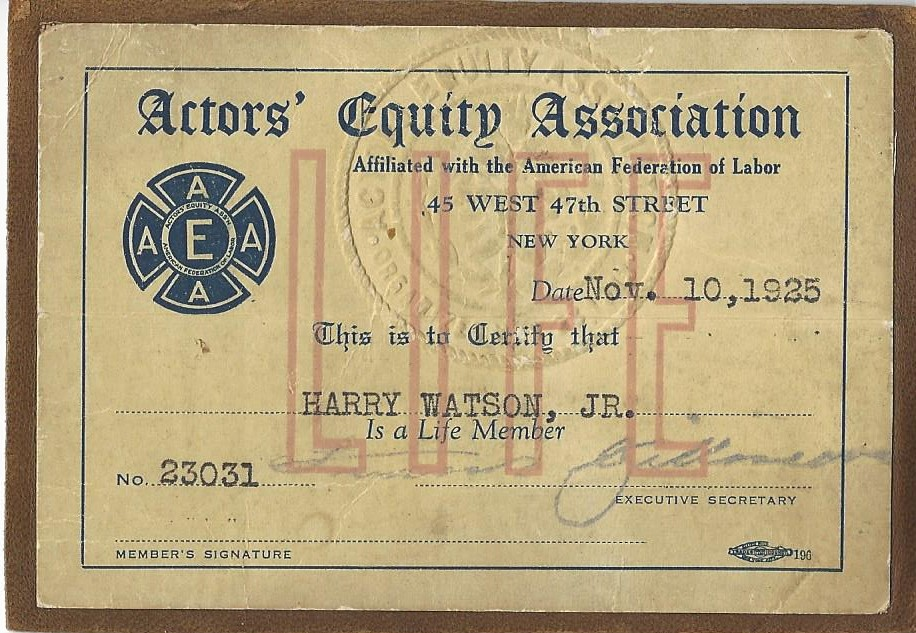
Harry Watson Jr's Equity card from 1925

An Equity card is proof of membership in the Actors' Equity Association of the United States or Equity in the United Kingdom.

== United States ==
=== History ===
Edwin Booth founded the "Players" in 1888 which held meetings at the "Players." The "Players" was an actors' club in Gramercy Park in Manhattan in New York City. The second organisation, Actors' Society of America, was formed in 1895 and was led by Louis Aldrich. Actors' Society of America was dissolved by vote of members in 1912.

The Actors' Equity Association was founded in New York City on May 26, 1913.

=== Joining Equity ===
One method for an actor or stage manager to become eligible to join the union is being employed under an Equity contract.

An actor or stage manager may also apply for membership if they are a member of any of the sister unions in the performing arts. These unions are the American Guild of Musical Artists (AGMA), American Guild of Variety Artists (AGVA), Screen Actors Guild - American Federation of Television and Radio Artists (SAG-AFTRA), and Guild of Italian American Actors (GIAA).

The third way one gets an equity card is through Open Access. In this program, actors and stage managers can join the union by demonstrating proof of having worked professionally as an actor or stage manager in a theatrical production within AEA's geographical jurisdiction.

The "Equity Membership Candidate Program" (EMC) was once a way to obtain membership in the union. In this program, actors and stage managers were allowed to work in Equity productions as credit towards eventual membership. An actor or stage manager was eligible for membership once they complete fifty weeks of work at theatres that were a part of the EMC program. This program was discontinued in 2026, in conjunction with the introduction of the Open Access program.

Once a member, the actor or stage manager is required to pay "yearly dues" of $176 plus "working dues" which are 2.5% of the gross earnings through an equity contract.

=== Member benefits and privileges ===
The first major benefit to having an Equity card, as an actor, is that many professional auditions are Equity-only calls. Non-members are allowed to attend, but with no guarantee of being seen. Equity members are allowed to attend these Equity-only calls without these restrictions.

Contract benefits for members include minimum wages, work rules such as length of work day, health insurance, pension, and workers' compensation insurance.

Once an individual is a member of Actor's Equity, they may not rehearse or perform in a non-Equity production without written permission from Equity. The rule does not apply to children under the age of 14, who may temporarily withdraw membership in order to perform in a non-equity production such as a school play.
