= American Federation of Television and Radio Artists =

Performers' union (1937–2012)

- Abbreviation: AFTRA
- Merged into: SAG-AFTRA
- Founded: August 16, 1937
- Dissolved: March 30, 2012
- Headquarters: Los Angeles, California, US
- Location: United States
- Members: 74,449
- Affiliations: AFL–CIO; International Federation of Actors; International Federation of Journalists
- Formerly called: American Federation of Radio Artists (1937–1952)

The American Federation of Television and Radio Artists (AFTRA) was a performers' union that represented a wide variety of talent, including actors in radio and television, radio and television announcers and newspersons, singers and recording artists (both royalty artists and background singers), promo and voice-over announcers and other performers in commercials, stunt persons and specialty acts—as the organization itself publicly stated, "AFTRA's membership includes an array of talent". On March 30, 2012, the members of AFTRA and of the Screen Actors Guild (SAG) voted to merge and form SAG-AFTRA.

== Background ==
AFTRA was located at 5757 Wilshire Blvd, 7th Floor, Los Angeles, California. There were also offices in New York City, Chicago, and several other American cities. The federation as a whole had 804 employees and total assets worth $30,403,661. AFTRA worked in the interests of its members, primarily in the areas of contract negotiation and enforcement, advocacy (including lobbying, legislation and public policy issues) and member benefits such as employer-paid health plans. AFTRA was affiliated with the AFL–CIO, the International Federation of Journalists and the International Federation of Actors. AFTRA also shared jurisdiction of radio, television, Internet and other new media with its sister union SAG, while the latter was the body solely responsible for motion picture performances.

== History ==
Membership (US records)
View source data.
Finances (US records; ×$1000)
View source data.

=== Radio years ===
Emboldened by the National Labor Relations Act passed by Congress in 1935, radio artists from Los Angeles banded together to form the Radio Actors Guild. About the same time, Broadway actor George Heller began lobbying Actors' Equity Association in New York for a contract protecting radio artists. This led to the creation of Radio Equity, existing under the umbrella of Actors' Equity.

On August 16, 1937, the American Federation of Radio Artists was formed, succeeding Radio Equity and the Radio Actors Guild. The Four As—the Associated Actors and Artistes of America—granted a charter to the new union, with 400 members in two locations. Chicago, the center for “soap opera” production, quickly followed New York and Los Angeles, with performers forming their own local chapter. By December 1937, AFRA had more than 2,000 members.

On July 12, 1938, with the support of radio stars Eddie Cantor, Edgar Bergen, Jack Benny, Bing Crosby, and others, AFRA members negotiated the first collectively bargained agreement on a national scale—with NBC and CBS—resulting in a wage increase of 125%. In 1939, after only two years in existence, AFRA covered 70% of live radio broadcasting through collective bargaining agreements.

In 1941, AFRA members negotiated the Transcription Code, providing for programs recorded for later broadcast, and building cost-of-living increases into contracts.

=== Television years ===
On 16 April 1950, due to a jurisdiction dispute over television performers, several unions in the entertainment industry including Chorus Equity, the American Guild of Variety Artists, the Associated Actors and Artistes of America, the American Guild of Musical Artists, and Actors' Equity Association formed the Television Authority (TVA), which negotiated the first network television contract in December.

By April 23, 1951, six Los Angeles TV stations signed contracts certifying Television Authority as their performers' sole union representative.

In 1951, the goal of a resolution from the 1947 National Convention was finally realized as AFRA negotiated the first Phonograph Recording Code for singers with the major recording labels.

On September 17, 1952, the Television Authority and AFRA merged to create a new union: the American Federation of Television and Radio Artists. George Heller was the first head of AFTRA, which had nearly 10,000 members. In 1954, AFTRA negotiated the AFTRA Pension and Welfare Plan (later became the AFTRA Health and Retirement Funds) which stood as the industry's first benefit package and was negotiated into other agreements.

In 1956, early television agreements had been based on live performances, but by the mid-1950s, videotape improved to the point where programs could be broadcast repeatedly. AFTRA members negotiated the first-ever formula for payments for replay of performances, which became the basis for residuals and syndication throughout the television industry. In 1960, AFTRA and Screen Actors Guild members conducted first joint negotiations on television commercials.

In 1967, AFTRA members called the union’s first national strike on March 29, 1967, after negotiations broke down over staff announcer contracts at owned-and-operated stations in New York, Chicago, and Los Angeles and over first-time contracts for “Newsmen” at networks and owned-and-operated stations. Since AFTRA adhered to a bargaining principle that no general agreement exists until all Codes and Contracts are acceptable, the 13-day strike involved all 18,000 members in more than 100 locations across the country. Agreement was reached on the outstanding issues at 8:05 p.m., EST, on Monday, April 10, 1967—just in time to allow broadcast of the 39th Academy Awards live from the Santa Monica Auditorium.

In 1974, a challenge by William F. Buckley to AFTRA's union shop agreements for news broadcasters failed as the US Supreme Court declined to review the case. AFTRA and SAG members jointly negotiated the contract covering primetime dramatic programming on the major television networks for the first time.

In 1978, in only the second national strike in AFTRA’s history, AFTRA and SAG members struck the advertising agencies and national advertisers over the jointly negotiated Commercials Contracts.

=== Cable, home video, digital years ===
In 1980, AFTRA and SAG members held a strike against prime time television, wanting a formula for performer participation in profits from sale of videocassettes and pay TV. In 1981, a merger of AFTRA and SAG jointly entered their "Phase 1 Agreement," calling for a number of jointly negotiated, ratified, and administered contracts.

AFTRA became the target of a lawsuit by Tuesday Productions, a San Diego–based non-union jingle house, which brought anti-trust charges against the union for attempting to organize performers. A jury award for triple damages of $12 million to the company drove AFTRA into Chapter 11 bankruptcy in 1982. After a financial settlement by AFTRA and SAG (which is also party to the suit), AFTRA emerged from Chapter 11 in 1983 and began to rebuild. AFTRA paid no money to Tuesday Production due to declaring bankruptcy.

In 1986, a strike against network television was averted when companies backed off the demand for AFTRA news broadcasters to assume sweeping technical duties.

In 1992, as part of a coalition of recording artists, singers, musicians, and others, AFTRA members worked with Congress to enact the Audio Home Recording Act of 1992, the Digital Performance Right in Sound Recordings Act of 1995 and the Digital Millennium Copyright Act of 1998. All three laws granted a performance right in sound recordings for a wide range of digital uses, including home recording and distribution by internet, cable, and satellite. AFTRA helped develop mechanisms to assure payments to recording artists from the collection and distribution of royalties established by the laws.

In 1993, AFTRA members negotiated the first Interactive Media Agreement to cover performances in video games. In 1996, Congress passed the Telecommunications Act, opening the door for massive ownership concentration in the broadcast sector.

In 2000, AFTRA and SAG members staged a six-month strike against advertisers to gain improvements in basic cable and internet commercials, preserving established residual formulas for new media outlets.

In 2003, in a referendum on the merger of AFTRA and SAG, AFTRA members supported consolidation by more than 75%, while SAG members rejected the merger with 58% voting for it. At least 60% was required to pass, leaving a deficiency of 640 votes.

In 2005, with the digital distribution of programming by Apple iTunes and the video iPod announced in October, AFTRA joined other entertainment unions in calling for ongoing dialogue with employers to ensure fair and proper compensation for performers’ work.

In 2006, AFTRA led the campaign against relaxation of media ownership rules by the Federal Communications Commission. Through 2007, AFTRA elected leaders, members, and staff testified at numerous hearings held throughout the country and sent letters to the FCC opposing consolidation of media ownership.

AFTRA and SAG members agreed with the advertising industry to examine performer compensation models for commercials appearing on television, radio, and internet, as well as the growing array of existing and yet-to-be-developed media. The study was intended to help inform negotiations of the Commercials Contracts when the two-year extension agreement expired October 28, 2008.

==== Merger with SAG ====
The merger between AFTRA and the Screen Actors Guild (SAG) to form SAG-AFTRA was approved by the memberships of both unions with 86% and 82% support respectively on March 30, 2012.

== Historical leadership: 1937-2012 ==
Presidents of AFTRA
President	Term
Eddie Cantor	1937–1940
Lawrence Tibbett	1940–1946
Ken Carpenter	1946–1948
Bud Collyer	1948–1950
Knox Manning	1950–1952
Alan Bunce	1952–1954
Frank Nelson	1954–1957
Bud Collyer	1957–1959
Virginia Payne	1959–1961
Art Gilmore	1961–1963
Vicki Vola	1963–1965
Tyler McVey	1965–1967
Mel Brandt	1967–1970
Bill Baldwin	1970–1973
Ken Harvey	1973–1976
Joe Slattery	1976–1979
Bill Hillman	1979–1984
Frank Maxwell	1984–1989
Reed Farrell	1989–1993
Shelby Scott	1993–2001
John Connolly	2001–2007
Roberta Reardon	2007–2012
