= American Federation of Actors =

Trade union

- Abbreviation: AFA
- Successor: American Guild of Variety Artists
- Formation: 1900
- Dissolved: 1939
- Type: Trade union
- Location: United States
- Affiliations: American Federation of Labor
- Formerly called: White Rats' Union (1900–1910); White Rats' Union of America (1910 – c. 1919); American Artistes' Federation (c. 1919 – c. 1934)

The American Federation of Actors (AFA) was an early actors union in the United States.

The union had a complex history. It originated as the White Rats' Union, which was founded and chartered by the American Federation of Labor (AFL) in 1900. In 1910, it absorbed the Actors' International Union, and changed its name to the White Rats Actors' Union of America. The union undertook a strike in 1917, but it was unsuccessful, and nearly led to the collapse of the union. Instead, in 1919, it merged into the Associated Actors and Artistes of America (4As), but remained an autonomous organization, as the American Artistes' Federation.

By 1930, the union was inactive. It left the 4As, but then rejoined in 1934 as the AFA. The union was supported by Sophie Tucker who was elected as the union's president in 1938. In 1939, the AFA was disbanded by the AFL for financial mismanagement. The AFL subsequently issued a charter to the succeeding American Guild of Variety Artists, with some AFA members joining the Actors' Equity Association.
