= Jack Coffey (television director) =

American television director

John L. Coffey (1927 - 19 July 2014) was an American television director.

== Positions held ==
- All My Children (Director: 1986–1993)
- Somerset (Director: 1974–1976)

== Awards and nominations ==
Coffey received 12 Daytime Emmy Award nominations and an Emmy nod. His first DE nomination was shared with Del Hughes and Henry Kaplan.
