= List of awards and nominations received by ABBA =

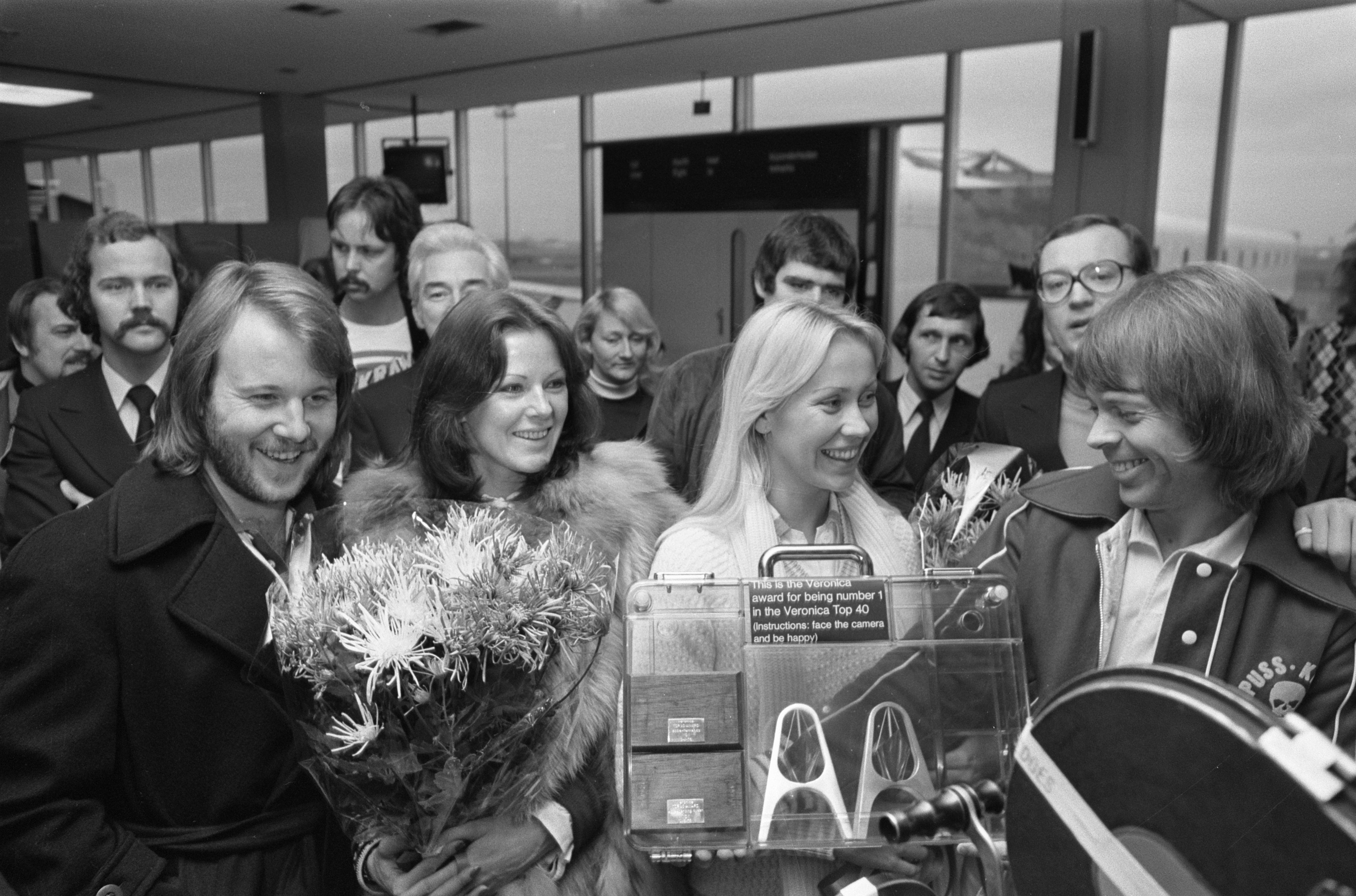
ABBA receiving a Veronica Top Charts Awards (Dutch Top 40) in 1976

ABBA are a Swedish popular music group that have had an active recording career since 1972, and achieved an enormous commercial success worldwide, having become one of the best-selling popular music groups in the history of recorded music.

== American Guild of Variety Artists Entertainer of The Year Awards ==
This was an annual award, sometimes called "Georgie", in several entertainment categories from AGVA, an American trade union representing performers in a variety entertainment, including circuses, Las Vegas showrooms and cabarets, comedy showcases, dance revues, magic shows, theme park shows, and arena and auditorium extravaganzas. ABBA were honored during 11th annual ceremony.

Year	Nominee / work	Award	Result
1981	ABBA	Vocal Group of the Year	Won

== Bravo Otto Awards ==
The Bravo Otto Awards are presented by Bravo magazine, the largest teen magazine within the German-language sphere. They are based on the annual readers' polls and honor top performers in film, music, television and sports.

Year	Nominee / work	Award	Result
1974	ABBA	Silver Award – Pop Group	Won
1975	ABBA	Bronze Award – Pop Group	Won
1976	ABBA	Bronze Award – Pop Group	Won
1977	ABBA	Bronze Award – Pop Group	Won
1978	ABBA	Silver Award – Pop Group	Won
1979	ABBA	Silver Award – Pop Group	Won
1980	ABBA	Silver Award – Pop Group	Won
1981	ABBA	Bronze Award – Pop Group	Won
1982	ABBA	Silver Award – Pop Group	Won

In 1983 poll, the group was voted #7 Pop Group of the Year.

== Brit Awards ==
The Brit Awards are the British Phonographic Industry's annual pop music awards. At the 1977 inaugural ceremony, the awards, then named Brittania/Jubilee Centenary Award, were presented for the "outstanding contributions in the past 25 years", thus all recordings released within the last 25 years and artists who have emerged in the period qualified for nominations. Next Brit Awards ceremony took place in 1982.

Year	Nominee / work	Award	Result
1977	ABBA/Arrival LP	Best International Single & LP	Nominated
2022	ABBA	Best International Group	Nominated
2023	ABBA	Brit Billion Award	Won

== Carl-Alan Awards ==
Currently called Carl Alan Awards, during ABBA's active years they were presented annually by the UK entertainment company Mecca in several categories for outstanding contribution to the world of dancing and dance music in the previous year. In the mid to late-20th century, the company owned the most extensive network of dance halls and nightclubs in the UK and members of British royal family handed the awards to the winners at the ceremony held every year, until 1983, at Mecca's top London venues: first, Empire Ballroom and later, the Lyceum Ballroom.

Year	Nominee / work	Award	Result
1977	Dancing Queen (recording)	Best Vocal Record for Dancing	Won
1977	ABBA (performer)	The Most Outstanding Group	Won
1978	Take A Chance On Me (recording)	Best Vocal Record for Dancing	Won

== Der Löwe von Radio Luxemburg prize (The Radio Luxembourg Lion Award) ==
The Radio Luxembourg Lion Award was an annual radio/television award presented by the radio/TV station Radio Luxembourg to honor achievements in pop & rock music. It was one of the most prestigious media awards in Europe.

Year	Nominee / work	Award	Result
1974	Waterloo (song)	Goldene Löwe (Golden Lion)	Won

== Grammy Awards ==
Year	Nominee / work	Award	Result
2022	"I Still Have Faith in You"	Record of the Year	Nominated
2023	Voyage	Album of the Year	Nominated
2023	Voyage	Best Pop Vocal Album	Nominated
2023	"Don't Shut Me Down"	Record of the Year	Nominated
2023	"Don't Shut Me Down"	Best Pop Duo/Group Performance	Nominated

== Other awards ==
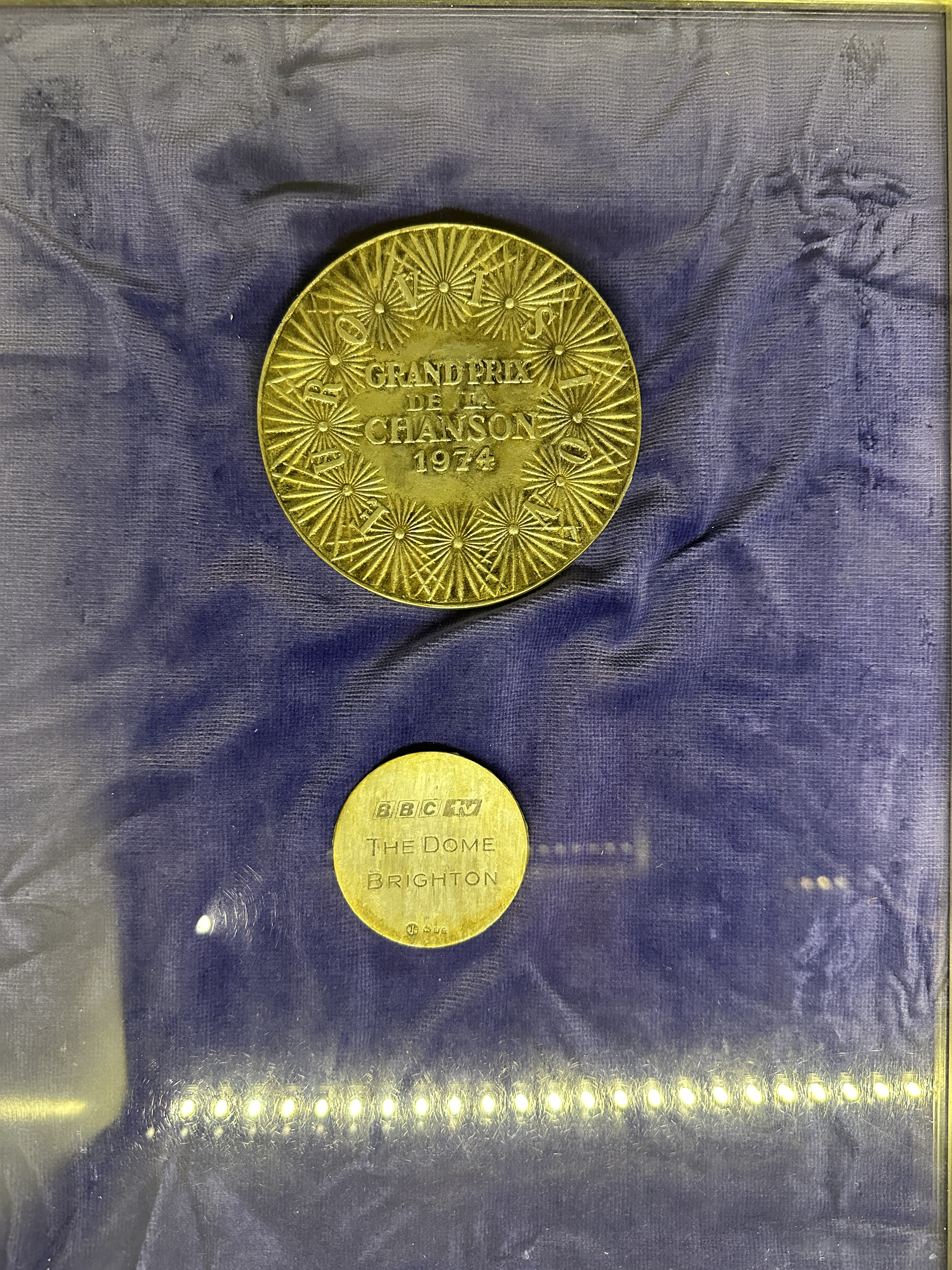
Prize for the 1974 Eurovision Song Contest

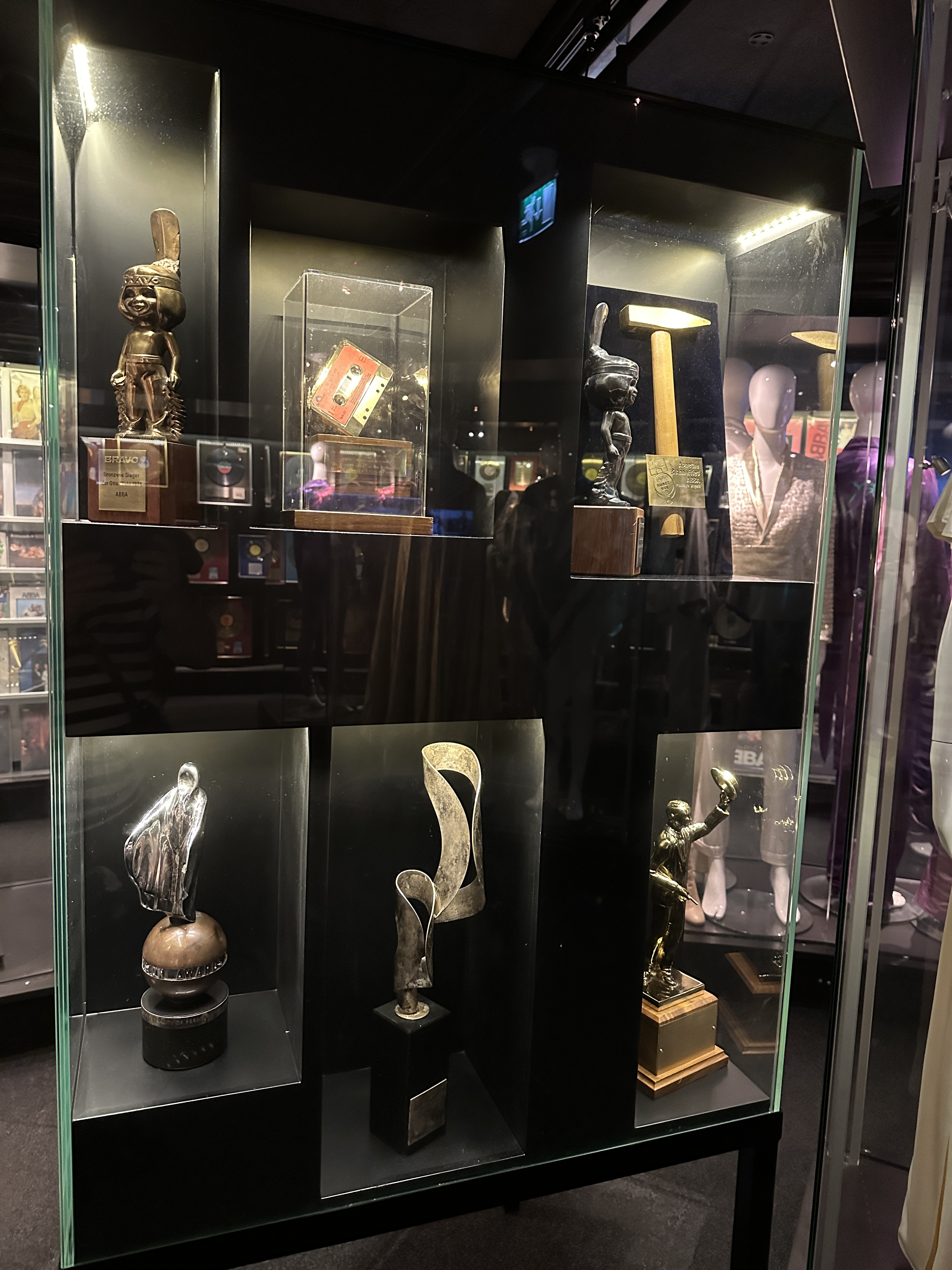
Some prizes for ABBA at ABBA The Museum

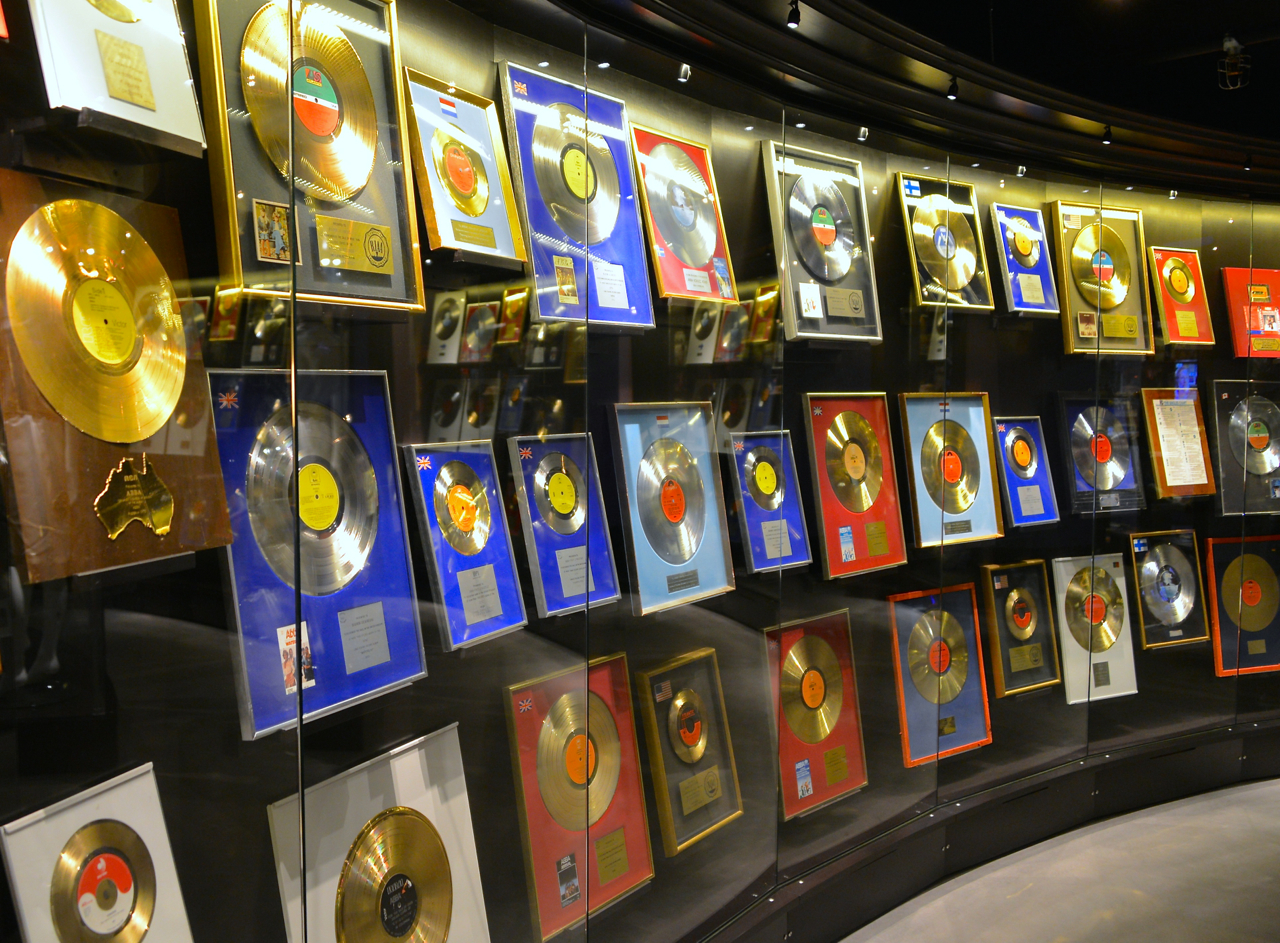
Music sales certifications at the ABBA The Museum

- 1974 – won the Eurovision Song Contest on 6 April for Sweden for the song "Waterloo", a song that was written expressly for the contest
- 1975 – won West German music prize Deutscher Schallplattenpreis for SOS single in a category Best Song of the Year
- 1978 – won Dutch music prize Edison Award (Dutch equivalent of Grammy Award) for The Album LP .
- 1979 – received Svenska grammofonpriset for Voulez Vous LP. The award was given by Royal Swedish Academy of Music and magazine Musikrevyn as the "Best Album Recorded and Produced in Sweden".
- 1981 – received Svenska grammofonpriset for Super Trouper LP. The award was given by Royal Swedish Academy of Music and magazine Musikrevyn as the "Best Album Recorded and Produced in Sweden".
- 1982 – received a Golden Gramophone Award from the then German recording company Deutsche Grammophon "in recognition of the outstanding contribution made by ABBA to popular music worldwide". Until then, only classical musicians received the award.
- 1982 – received a Swedish culture prize (Expressens Kulturpris) Spelmannen established by the evening newspaper Expressen and selected by the jury of members of Swedish Academy and Royal Swedish Academy of Music. Until 1999, ABBA remained the only pop/rock musicians who ever received this award.
- 1992 – received an Honorary Grammis Award.
- 1993 – won a World Music Award as the Best-Selling Swedish Artists of the Year for ABBA Gold: Greatest Hits.
- 2000 – won the Rockbjörnen Swedish Artist of the Century Award.
- 2002 – inducted into United States Vocal Group Hall of Fame
- 2001 – Ulvaeus and Andersson received a Special International Ivor Novello Award. They also twice received the Music Export Prize from the Swedish Government and the Lifetime Achievement Award from the Swedish Music Publishers Association (SMFF).
- 2002 – Andersson is given an honorary professorship by the Swedish Government for his "ability to create high-class music reaching people around the world".
- 2002 – received a Japan Gold Disc Award from the Recording Industry Association of Japan in the category Best International Pop Album of the Year for the SOS – Best of ABBA hit collection.
- 2004 – Ulvaeus, Andersson and Lyngstad arrived in London for the 30th anniversary of their Eurovision Song Contest win in 1974, appearing on stage after the fifth anniversary performance of Mamma Mia!. While on stage, they were presented an award from Universal Music and Polar Music for achieving record sales of 360 million sales worldwide between 1974 and 2004.
- 2005 – during the celebratory show for the 50th anniversary of the Eurovision Song Contest, Congratulations, held in Copenhagen, Denmark, "Waterloo" was voted the best Eurovision song in the history of the contest. Despite pre-show rumours to the contrary, no band member was present to accept the accolade.
- 2005 – the DVD version of the 1980 TV special ABBA in Concert is nominated for a Grammis.
- 2006 – ABBA: The Movie won a Grammis as the Best Music DVD.
- 2009 – Faltskog and Lyngstad at the ceremony in Stockholm's Cirkus receive on behalf of ABBA the Rockbjornen's Lifetime Achievement Award
- 2010 – On 27 January, at the London premiere of the "AbbaWorld" exhibition, ABBA was presented with an award recognizing total sales of 375,000,000 by Universal Music chairman and CEO Lucian Grainge.
- 2010 – ABBA was inducted into the United States Rock and Roll Hall of Fame. Lyngstad and Andersson attended the award ceremony on 15 March in New York.
- ABBA have two postage stamps of their own, issued by the Swedish Postal Service (Posten AB) in 1983 and 2000.
- 2015 – Dancing Queen was inducted into the United States Grammy Hall of Fame
- 2022 – ABBA was awarded the 2021 Swedish Government's Music Export Prize after the success of the 'Voyage' album and to celebrate 50 years since the group's formation.
- 2023 – On 4 May ABBA was one of the first artists to receive the BRIT Billion Award which celebrates those who have surpassed the milestone of one billion UK streams in their career.
- 2024 – On 21 March all four members of ABBA were appointed Commander, First Class, of the Royal Order of Vasa by His Majesty King Carl XVI Gustaf of Sweden. This was the first time for almost 50 years that the Swedish Royal Orders of Knighthood was bestowed on Swedes, coincidently also 50 years after winning the Eurovision Song Contest. ABBA shared the honour with nine other recipients.
