= Associated Actors and Artistes of America =

Trade union federation

- Abbreviation: 4As
- Formation: 1919
- Location: United States
- President: Gabrielle Carteris
- Affiliations: AFL-CIO

The Associated Actors and Artistes of America (4As), established in 1919, is the federation of trade unions for performing artists in the United States.

The union was established by the merger of the Actors' Equity Association and the White Rats of America. By the mid-1940s, its affiliates were:

- Actors' Equity Association
- American Federation of Radio Artists
- American Guild of Musical Artists
- American Guild of Variety Artists
- Brother Artists Association
- Chorus Equity Association
- Hebrew Chorus Union
- Hungarian Actors' and Artists' Association
- Screen Actors' Guild

As of 2022, the following unions belong to the 4As:

- The Actors' Equity Association (AEA)
- The American Guild of Musical Artists (AGMA)
- The American Guild of Variety Artists (AGVA)
- The Guild of Italian American Actors (GIAA) also known as Italian Actors' Union
- The Screen Actors Guild-American Federation of Television and Radio Artists (SAG-AFTRA)

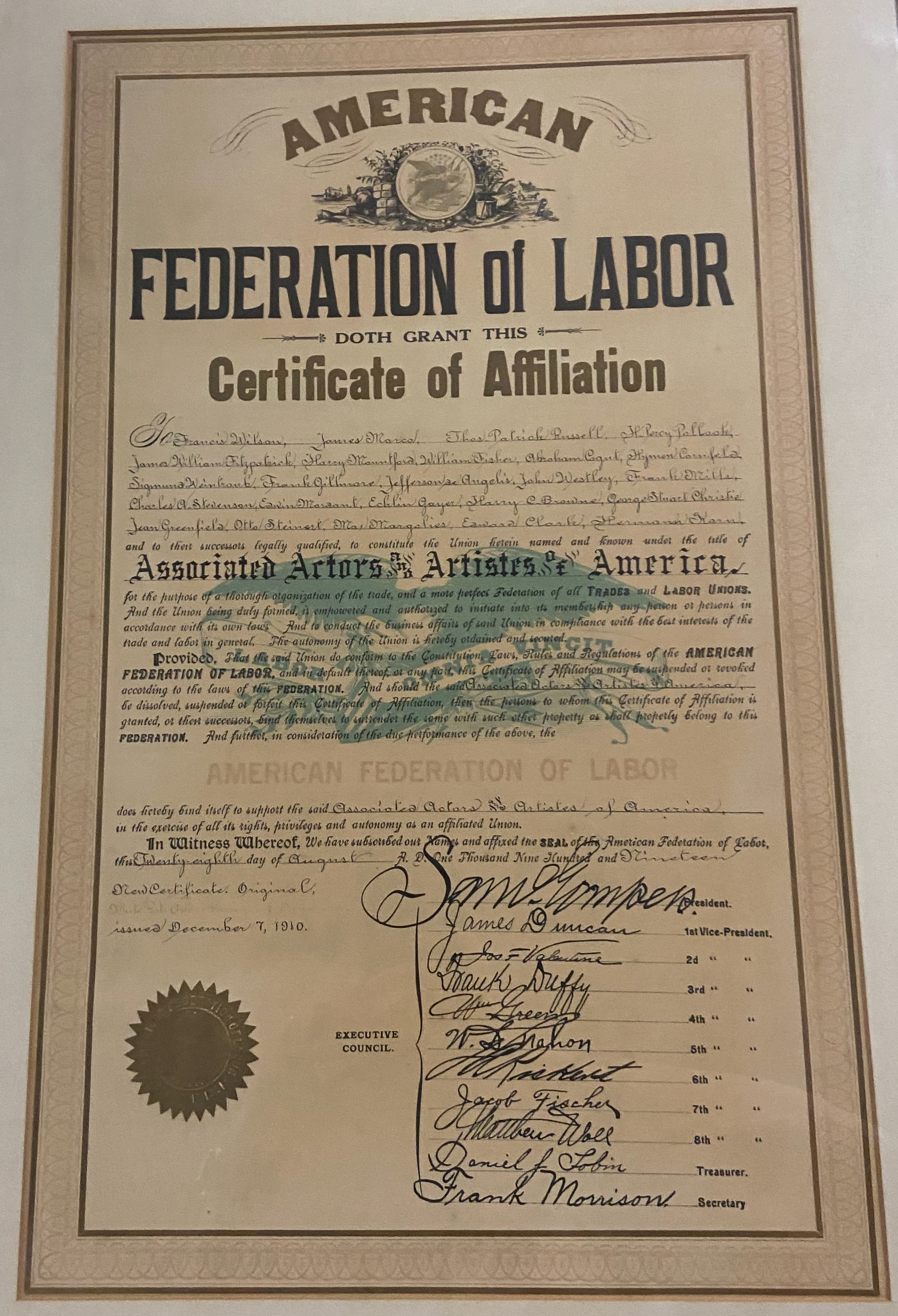
The certificate of affiliation the Associated Actors and Artistes of America received from the American Federation of Labor

The organization is a member of the AFL–CIO. The 4As splits its votes in AFL-CIO elections based on the wishes of each member union. The current AAAA member unions of the AFL–CIO are: AEA, AGMA, GIAA, and SAG-AFTRA. The well-known performer and civil rights activist Theodore Bikel was President of the 4As until his death in 2015.

On June 1, 2014, Department for Professional Employees, AFL–CIO (DPE) took over administrative functions of the 4As, as per an April 15, 2014, agreement between the DPE and the 4As. As part of the agreement, AGVA and GIAA affiliated with the DPE. AGMA, already a DPE affiliate, AGVA, and GIAA remain AFL-CIO affiliates through the 4As. The other two 4As members, AEA and SAG-AFTRA, previously received direct charters from the AFL-CIO. DPE President Paul Almeida became the Executive Secretary of the 4As .

== Officers ==
The following are the 4As officers as of July 15, 2024:

- President – Gabrielle Carteris, SAG-AFTRA
- 1st Vice President – Duncan Crabtree-Ireland, SAG-AFTRA
- 2nd Vice President – Alvin Vincent, Jr., AEA
- 3rd Vice President – Susanne Doris, AGVA
- 4th Vice President – Allison Beck, AGMA
- 5th Vice President – Carlo Fiorletta, GIAA
- Treasurer – Nikki Switzer, AEA
- Executive Secretary – Paul E. Almeida, 4As
