= Del Hughes =

American stage manager

Del Hughes (September 4, 1909 – May 18, 1985) was an American stage manager and director working primarily on Broadway and in television (The Brighter Day, All My Children). Hughes stage managed nearly thirty Broadway productions, some of which he also starred in himself. The Stage Managers' Association has named an award after Del Hughes' legacy on Broadway: "The Del Hughes Award for the Lifetime Achievement in the Art of Stage Management".

== Early life ==
Hughes was born Delbert Charles Hughes to Albert J. Hughes and Lena J. Meilstrup in Detroit, Michigan on September 4, 1909. His father worked as a shipping clerk. He married Julia Johnston on September 3, 1937. They remained married until her death in 1979. Del Hughes never remarried.

== Career ==
Hughes made his Broadway performance debut in 1933 as Captain Tim in Tobacco Road. He made his stage management debut as a replacement in 1941 for the same play. He would continue stage managing after Tobacco Road closed, sporadically performing alongside stage management duties. Stage management and directing would become his primary occupation after Tobacco Road.

Hughes went on to stage manage the original productions of renowned works including Arthur Miller's Death of a Salesman, and The Crucible. In addition to his stage management duties for The Crucible, Hughes starred as Reverend John Hale in the original Broadway production.

Other notable Broadway productions stage managed by Hughes include The Children's Hour, One Flew Over The Cuckoo's Nest, The Trial of Lee Harvey Oswald, and The Complaisant Lover.

== Death and legacy ==
Hughes died on May 18, 1985, at the age of 75. His daughter Julie Hughes, a casting agent, helped establish an award in his name in conjunction with the Stage Managers' Association. The award, The Del Hughes Award for Lifetime Achievement in the Art of Stage Management, commemorates stage managers who have made a significant artistic impact to the theatrical community through their work in stage management.

Hughes' personal production files and promptbooks are stored at the Billy Rose Theatre Division of the New York Public Library for the Performing Arts and are accessible to the public.
