= David Furr =

American actor

David Furr is an American theatre, film, and television actor. He received a Tony Award nomination for his role in Roundabout Theatre Company's Broadway revival of Noises Off and a Screen Actors Guild Award nomination as part of the cast of HBO's The Gilded Age.

== Personal life ==
Furr is a native of Greensboro, North Carolina, where he lives with his wife and children. He studied theater at Appalachian State University, graduating in 1994.

== Selected filmography ==
=== Film ===
List of film appearances, with year, title, and role shown
Year	Title	Role	Notes
2007	Evening	Ralph Haverford	
2011	The Importance of Being Earnest	Jack Worthing	
2011	It May Be Love But It Doesn't Show	Peter	
2013	Killing Lincoln	Frederick Seward	
2016	13 Hours: The Secret Soldiers of Benghazi	DS Alec	
2017	The Sounding	Ed	
2019	The Highwaymen	John Quinn	
TBA	A Long Winter †	TBA	Filming

=== Television ===
List of television appearances, with year, title, and role shown
Year	Title	Role	Notes
2004–2009	All My Children	Jay Stark / hotel manager	5 episodes
2006	As the World Turns	Dr. Morris	1 episode
2006	Guiding Light	Agent Dan Golson	1 episode
2008	CSI: Miami	Neil Jackson	1 episode
2010	Law & Order: Special Victims Unit	Greg Elding	1 episode
2011	The Chicago Code	Aaron Fash	1 episode
2012	The Mentalist	Ian Breitler	1 episode
2012	Private Practice	Rich	1 episode
2012	Person of Interest	Paul Ashton	1 episode
2012	The Good Wife	Tim Landis	1 episode
2012–2013	NCIS: Los Angeles	Special Agent Jonas Ambrose	2 episodes
2013	Elementary	Paul Reeves	1 episode
2014	State of Affairs	Thomas Logan	1 episode
2014	The Michael J. Fox Show	Andy	2 episodes
2014	Unforgettable	Hank Bronski	1 episode
2014	Royal Pains	Bill Cartwright	1 episode
2014–2017	Turn: Washington's Spies	Walter Havens	3 episodes
2015	The Following	Tucker	2 episodes
2015	The Americans	Ted Paaswell	2 episodes
2016	Madam Secretary	Dan Santangelo	2 episodes
2016	BrainDead	Dr. Colin Mitchell	1 episode
2016–2017	Odd Mom Out	Graham Whitman	4 episodes
2017	Mr. Mercedes	Josh	4 episodes
2017	Iron Fist	Wendell Rand	4 episodes
2017	Blindspot	Agent Joshua Boyd	1 episode
2017	The Blacklist	Ben Charnquist	1 episode
2018	Dynasty	Nico Russo	2 episodes
2018	The Good Cop	Mickey	1 episode
2018	The Man in the High Castle	George Lincoln Rockwell	4 episodes
2019	The Code	Congressman Bobby Jones	1 episode
2019–2020	Bull	Greg Valerian	7 episodes
2020	New Amsterdam	Jeremy Cafferty	1 episode
2020	FBI	Roger Jamison	1 episode
2021	The Equalizer	Elijah Reade	1 episode
2023	The Gilded Age	Dashiell Montgomery	8 episodes

== Awards and nominations ==
Year	Award	Category	Play	Result	Ref
2005	Henry Award	Outstanding Supporting Actor in a Play	All My Sons	Nominated	
2005	Ovation Award	Best Actor	All My Sons	Nominated	
2012	St. Clair Bayfield Award	Best Performance in a Supporting Role by an Actor in a Shakespearean Play in the NY Metropolitan Area	As You Like It	Won	
2012	Falstaff Award	Best Supporting Performance, Male	As You Like It	Won	
2016	Tony Award	Tony Award for Best Featured Actor in a Play	Noises Off	Nominated	
2016	Drama Desk Award	Outstanding Featured Actor in a Play	Noises Off	Nominated	
2023	Screen Actors Guild Awards	Outstanding Performance by an Ensemble in a Drama Series	The Gilded Age	Nominated	
