= David Pittu =

American actor, writer and director (born 1967)

- Born: April 4, 1967 (age 59); Fairfield, Connecticut, U.S.
- Occupations: Actor; writer; director
- Years active: 1995–present

David Jonathan Pittu (Romanian: Pitu; born April 4, 1967) is an American actor, writer and director.

Pittu was born and grew up in Fairfield, Connecticut where, as a high school senior, he was a finalist in the NFAA's Arts Recognition Talent Search in Drama. He graduated from New York University 's Tisch School of the Arts in 1989.

Pittu's theater work includes plays and musicals, and he has received two Tony Award nominations. He was nominated for the 2007 Best Featured Actor in a Musical for playing Bertolt Brecht in Harold Prince's LoveMusik and for the 2008 Best Featured Actor in a Play for his multiple-role turn in the Mark Twain comedy Is He Dead? adapted by David Ives and directed by Michael Blakemore.

He received the Daryl Roth 2010 Creative Spirit Award.

He received the 2009 St. Clair Bayfield Award for his performance in Twelfth Night at the Delacorte Theatre in 2009, directed by Daniel Sullivan. Also under Sullivan's direction, he played Paul Wolfowitz and others, in David Hare's Stuff Happens in 2006 at the Public Theater, which received a Drama Desk Award for Outstanding Ensemble.

He wrote and starred in What's That Smell: The Music of Jacob Sterling, a musical satire about a luckless, eternally "up-and-coming" composer-lyricist. Pittu also wrote the lyrics, with music by Randy Redd to What's That Smell, which premiered Off-Broadway at the Atlantic Theater Company in September 2008. The play with music received two Lucille Lortel Award nominations including one for Best Off-Broadway Musical, and was included in both the Entertainment Weekly and The New York Times Top 10 Best Lists in Theater 2008.

Other notable theater work: David Ives' The Heir Apparent (2014 Off-Broadway, CSC, director John Rando); Bill Cain's Equivocation (2010, Off-Broadway Manhattan Theater Club) directed by Garry Hynes; Tom Stoppard's The Coast of Utopia (2006, Broadway, Lincoln Center); Harold Pinter's Celebration and The Room (2005, Off-Broadway, Atlantic Theater Company); and Stephen Sondheim's Company, part of the Kennedy Center Sondheim Celebration (2002).

His performance as Leo Frank in the National Tour of Jason Robert Brown's Parade, directed by Harold Prince, earned him the 2001 National Broadway Award (Best Actor in a Musical). He appeared in the Encores! staged concert productions Of Thee I Sing (2007, as the French ambassador); Bells Are Ringing (2010, as Sandor); It's a Bird...It's a Plane...It's Superman (2013, as Dr. Abner Sedgwick) and Girl From the North Country at the Public Theater (2018, as Reverend Marlowe). He has also done numerous concerts with Ted Sperling's MasterVoices at City Center and Carnegie Hall.

His film and television credits include Halston (Netflix), Capote vs. The Swans (FX/Hulu), and American Horror Stories (FX).

He is an accomplished narrator of audio books, including Donna Tartt 's Pulitzer Prize winner The Goldfinch, which received two "Audie" Awards: Best Literary Fiction and Best Male Solo Performance, 2014.

Pittu is one of the trustees of the literary estate of George S. Kaufman, along with theater historian and NYU professor Laurence Maslon.

== Filmography ==
=== Film ===
Year	Title	Role	Notes
2025	Atrabilious	Dominick Calderon	
2023	Sharper	David/Lawyer	
2017	Submission	Bernard Levy	
2016	Café Society	Roger	
2015	True Story	Marcus Lickermann	
2012	Men in Black 3	Roman the Fabulist	
2006	Shortbus	Jacuzzi Hunter	
2005	King Kong	Weston	

=== Television ===
Year	Title	Role	Notes
2024	American Horror Stories	Aaron	Episode: "Backrooms"
2022	Uncoupled	Dennis	2 episodes
2021	Halston	Joe Eula	5 episodes
2020	The Plot Against America	Irv Simkowitz	2 episodes
2018	Elementary	William Bazemore	Episode: "Fit to be Tied"
2016	House of Cards	Dr. Saxon	3 episodes
2015	The Knick	Dr. Phelps	2 episodes
2015	The Following	Eldon	Episode: "Flesh & Blood"
2013	Person of Interest	Derek Fowler	Episode: "Booked Solid"
2012	Made in Jersey	Vogel	2 episodes
2011–2014	Law & Order: Special Victims Unit	Linus Tate	6 episodes
2011	Pan Am	Paul Gilbert	2 episodes
2011	Damages	Jack Shaw	5 episodes
2010–2012	The Good Wife	Spencer Roth	2 episodes
2010	Law & Order: Criminal Intent	Roy Loftin	Episode: "Loyalty"
2009	Rescue Me	Charles	3 episodes
2009	Fringe	Robert Swift	Episode: "Unleashed"
2001	Law & Order	Donald Albers	Episode: "Phobia"

=== Videogames ===
Year	Title	Role
2010	Red Dead Redemption	The Local Population
2008	Grand Theft Auto IV	The Crowd of Liberty City
2006	Neverwinter Nights 2	Shadow Reaver #1, Brawler #1, Wolf #1, Commoner #2, Mordren
2003	Manhunt	Smilie
