= St. Clair Bayfield Award =

The St. Clair Bayfield Award was established in 1973 by the Actors' Equity Association in honor of St. Clair Bayfield to recognize Shakespearean actors and actresses of the New York metropolitan area.

Year	Recipient	Role	Play	Production
1973	Barnard Hughes	Dogberry	Much Ado About Nothing	New York Shakespeare Festival
1974	Randy Kim	Trinculo	The Tempest	New York Shakespeare Festival
1975	John Glover	Clown	The Winter's Tale	New York Shakespeare Festival
1976	Carolyne McWilliams	Mariana	Measure for Measure	New York Shakespeare Festival
1977	No Award	–	–	–
1978	Carmen DeLavalape	Emelia	Othello	New York Shakespeare Festival
1979	Robert Christian	Aufidius	Coriolanus	New York Shakespeare Festival
1980	No award	–	–	–
1981	Ralph Drischell	Earl of Worcester	Henry IV	New York Shakespeare Festival
1982	Tom Spackman	Edmund	King Lear	New York Shakespeare Festival
1983	Concetta Tomei	Queen Elizabeth	Richard III	New York Shakespeare Festival
1984	Anthony Heald	Fluellen	Henry V	New York Shakespeare Festival
1985	No award	–	–	–
1986	Nathan Lane	Pompey	Measure for Measure	New York Shakespeare Festival
1987	No Award	–	–	–
1988	Bradley Whitford	Paris	Romeo and Juliet	New York Shakespeare Festival
1989	Keith David	Aufidius	Coriolanus	New York Shakespeare Festival
1990	Dana Ivey	Gertrude	Hamlet	New York Shakespeare Festival
1991	Byron Jennings	Pericles	Pericles, Prince of Tyre	New York Shakespeare Festival
1992	Elizabeth McGovern	Rosalind	As You Like It	New York Shakespeare Festival
1993	Michael Cumpsty	Alcibiades	Timon of Athens	National Theatre
1994	Malcolm Gets	Proteus	The Two Gentlemen of Verona	New York Shakespeare Festival
1995	Stephen Spinella	Pandarus	Troilus and Cressida	New York Shakespeare Festival
1996	Nicholas Kepros	Escalus	Measure for Measure	Theatre for a New Audience
1997	Jayne Atkinson	Katherine	Henry VIII	New York Shakespeare Festival
1998	Brian Murray	Toby Belch	Twelfth Night	Lincoln Center
1999	Max Wright	Christopher Sly	The Taming of the Shrew	New York Shakespeare Festival
2000	Rachel Botchan	Lady Ann	Richard III	Pearl Theatre Company
2001	Andrew Weems	Thersites	Troilus and Cressida	Theatre for a New Audience
2002	Ray Virta	Benedick	Much Ado About Nothing	Pearl Theatre
2003	Dakin Matthews	Glendower / Warwick	Henry IV, Parts 1, 2	Vivian Beaumont Theater
2004	Carman Lacivita	multiple characters	Rose Rage: Henry VI, 1, 2, 3	Chicago Shakespeare Theater
2005	Colm Feore	Cassius	Julius Caesar	Belasco Theatre
2006	George Morfogen	Duke of York	Richard II	Classic Stage Company
2007	Jay O. Sanders	Bottom	A Midsummer Night's Dream	The Public Theater
2008	Stark Sands	Ferdinand	The Tempest	Classic Stage Company
2009	David Pittu	Feste	Twelfth Night	The Public Theater
2010	Charles Kimbrough	Prince of Arragon	The Merchant of Venice	The Public Theater
2011	Nick Westrate	Berowne	Love's Labour's Lost	The Public Theater
2012	David Furr	Orlando	As You Like It	The Public Theater
2013	Tina Benko	Titania	A Midsummer Night's Dream	Theatre for a New Audience
2014	Amanda Quaid	Dionyza/Bawd	Pericles, Prince of Tyre	The Public Theater
2015	Andy Grotelueschen	Launce/Duke	The Two Gentlemen of Verona	Fiasco Theater
2016	Louis Cancelmi	Achilles	Troilus and Cressida	Shakespeare in the Park
2017	Peter Friedman	Polonius	Hamlet	The Public Theater
2018	Mia Katigbak	Humphrey, Duke of Gloucester	Henry VI	National Asian American Theater Company
2019	Jonathan Hadary	Sicinius Velutus	Coriolanus	The Public Theater
2020	No award	–	–	–
2021	No award	–	–	–
2022	Amber Gray	Banquo	Macbeth	Longacre Theatre
2023	Darius de Haas	Duke Senior	As You Like It	The Public Theater
