= Actors' Equity Association =

American labor union for theater performers

- Abbreviation: AEA; Actors' Equity; Equity
- Formation: May 26, 1913; 113 years ago
- Type: Trade union
- Headquarters: New York City, US
- Location: United States
- Members: 50,785 (2021)
- President: Brooke Shields
- Executive director: Al Vincent Jr.
- Affiliations: AFL-CIO; Associated Actors and Artistes of America; International Federation of Actors
- Website: actorsequity.org

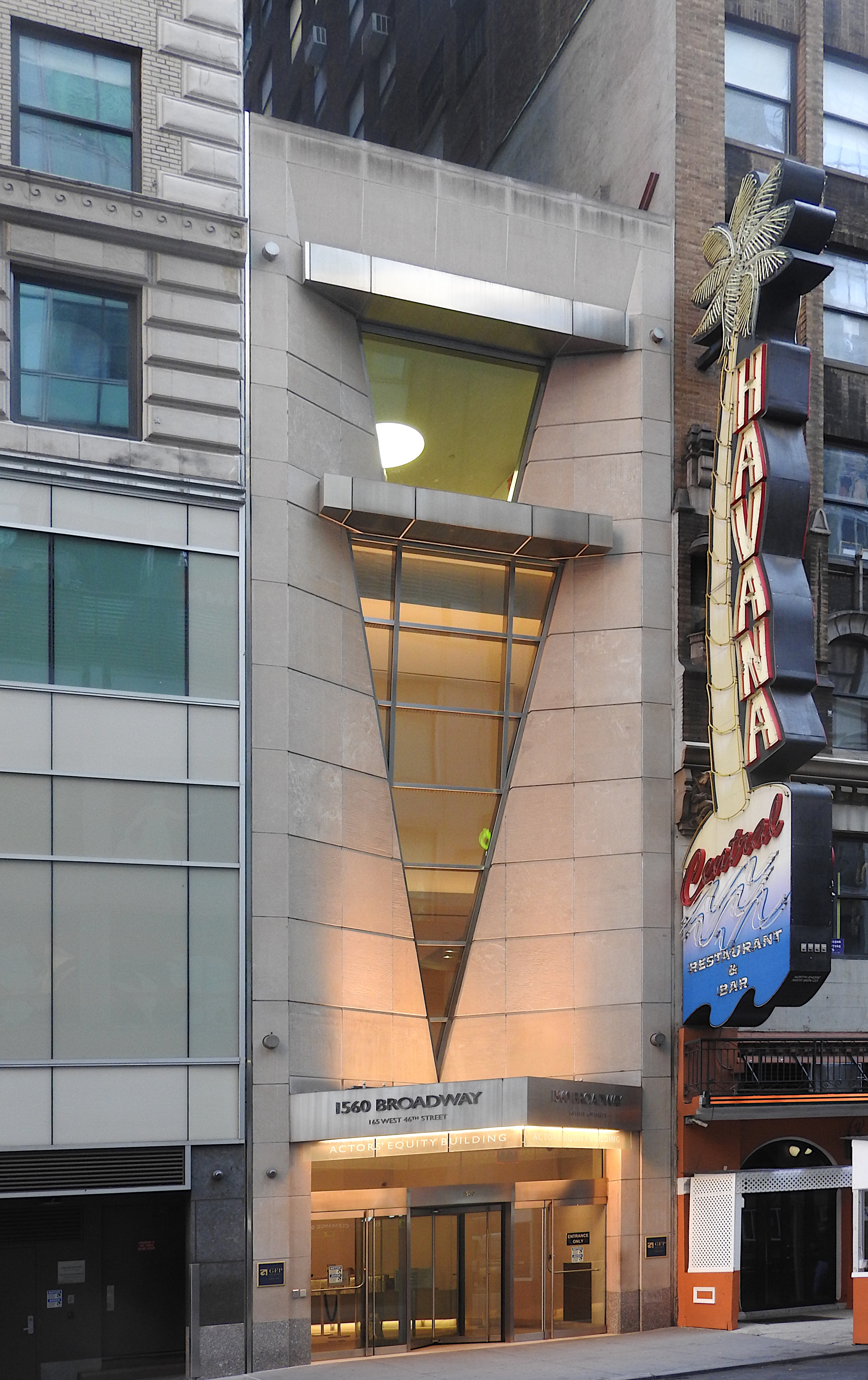
Actors Equity Building, near Times Square

The Actors' Equity Association (AEA), commonly called Actors' Equity or simply Equity, is an American labor union representing those who work in live theatrical performance. Performers appearing in live stage productions without a book or through-storyline (vaudeville, cabarets, circuses) may be represented by the American Guild of Variety Artists (AGVA). The AEA works to negotiate quality living conditions, livable wages, and benefits for performers and stage managers. A theater or production that is not produced and performed by AEA members may be called "non-Equity".

== Background ==
Leading up to the Actors' and Producers' strike of 1929, Hollywood and California in general had a series of workers' equality battles that directly influenced the film industry. The films The Passaic Textile Strike (1926), The Miners' Strike (1928) and The Gastonia Textile Strike (1929) gave audience and producers insight into the effect and accomplishments of labor unions and striking. These films were set apart by being current documentaries, not merely melodramas produced for glamor.

In 1896, the first Actors Union Charter was recognized by the American Federation of Labor as an attempt to create a minimum wage for actors being exploited. It was not until January 13, 1913, that the Union Charter failed. It later reemerged as the Actors Equity Association, with more than 111 actors and Francis Wilson as its founding board president.

== History ==
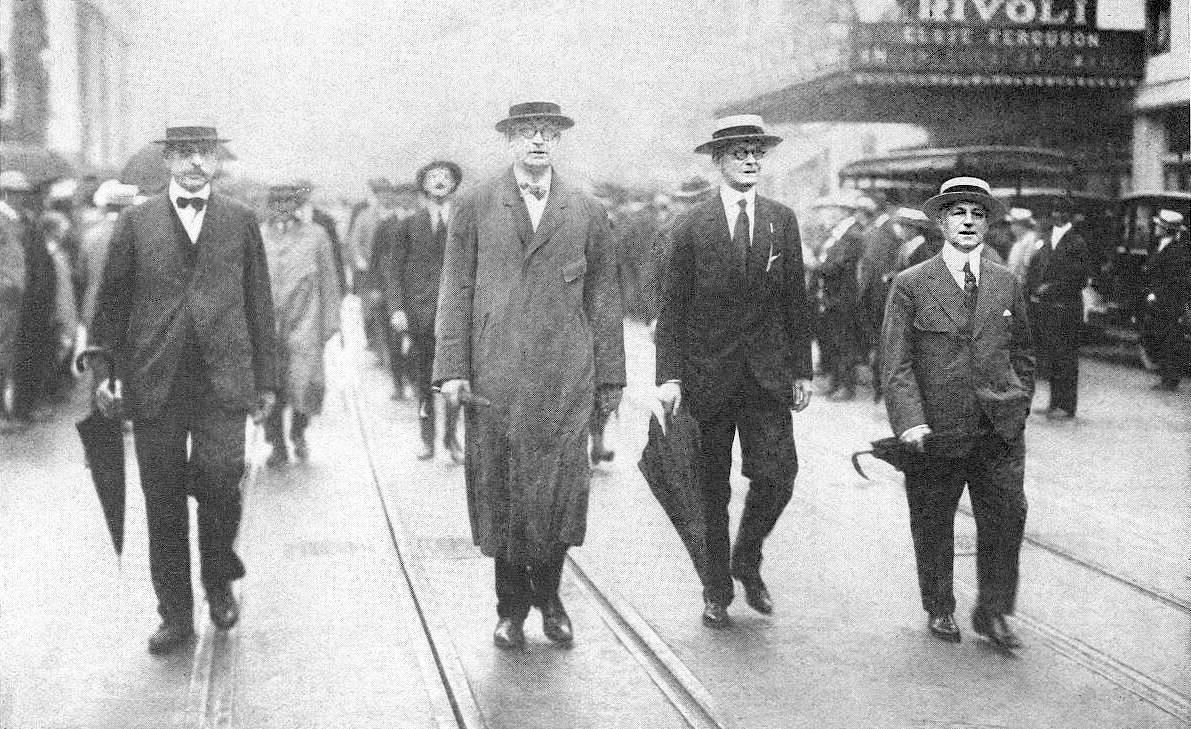
Actors' Equity president Francis Wilson (right) on parade with other leaders during the 1919 strike seeking recognition of the association as a labor union

Marie Dressler, Ethel Barrymore and others during the 1919 strike

At a meeting held at the Pabst Grand Circle Hotel in New York City, on May 26, 1913, Actors' Equity was founded by 112 professional theater actors, who established its constitution and elected Francis Wilson as president.

Leading up to the association's establishment, a handful of influential actors—known as The Players—held secret organizational meetings at Edwin Booth's The Players at its Gramercy Park mansion. A bronze plaque commemorates the room in which The Players met to establish Actors' Equity. Members included Frank Gillmore, who was the executive secretary of Actors' Equity from 1918 to 1929 and president from 1929 to 1937.

Actors' Equity joined the American Federation of Labor in 1919, and called a strike seeking recognition as a labor union. The strike ended the dominance of the Producing Managers' Association, including theater owners and producers like Abe Erlanger and his partner, Mark Klaw. The strike increased membership from under 3,000 to approximately 14,000. The Chorus Equity Association, which merged with Actors' Equity in 1955, was founded during the strike.

Equity represented directors and choreographers until 1959, when they broke away and formed their own union.

In 2023, dancers at the Star Garden Topless Dive Bar in Los Angeles voted to join the union, becoming the only unionized strip club in the United States.

== 1929 nationwide actors and producers strike threat ==
Membership (US records) View source data.
Finances (US records; ×$1000) View source data.

The Actors Equality Strike was a series of walkouts that started in 1927 in local theaters in Los Angeles and quickly grew to the motion picture stage. During the nationwide walkouts, the Academy of Motion Picture Arts and Sciences started issuing contracts to freelance film actors, which led Hollywood's actors and actresses to fear the loss of their jobs. The theater strikes combined with freelance contracts fueled the need for actors and stagehands to strike for better working conditions and pay.

Frank Gillmore, the head and treasurer of the Actor's Equity Association, understood that he would need multiple unions across the country to make a change not only in proper representation and pay, but in actors' ability to negotiate any contract a studio would put out worldwide. On July 20, 1929, the AEA gained its first victory, which gave producers and actors a leg to stand on in their battle for equality. Over 30 days (up to August 20, 1929), Gillmore fought to give the AEA the ability to represent all actors, producers, radio personality, vaudeville performers, and agents in the country. This would also give all power and representation to one organization in order to create a more organized equality strike.

Starting on June 5, 1929, Gillmore attended several meetings in New York with the heads of Broadway. After the meeting, he notified the AEA that appearances in sound and talking motion pictures had been suspended until the outcome of the meetings with the international Studio Crafts Union.

Due to the negotiations and the suspension of contracts through the AEA, studios were desperate for actors to speed up production, which had dropped significantly. The New York Times wrote, "It was pointed out that while the Equality regulations were in effect, about 2000 motion picture contracts, involving salaries said to amount to $500,000 were offered to actors in New York." Any actor who entered into a contract not approved by the AEA would be banished from the union and have to reapply for admission after negotiations were finished.

By December 1929, the AEA was negotiating terms to reset the movie stage under better conditions, but this was the least of its problems. In late December, groups of theater owners and non-represented producers filed lawsuits to claim damages from the AEA's contract holdout. "The plaintiffs not only seek a temporary injunction against the defendants, pending trial on an order to show cause why a permanent injunction should not be granted, but also ask damages of $100,000."

=== Effects of strike ===
The AEA allowed small numbers of contracts to be negotiated over the next few years. In 1933, the Screen Actors Guild was created and took the AEA's place as the main representative for movie actors and producers. This allowed the AEA to focus on live productions, such as theatrical performances, while the Screen Actors Guild focused on movie production and non-scripted live performances, such as minstrel, vaudeville, and live radio shows.

== Causes ==
In the 1940s, the AEA stood against segregation. When actors were losing jobs through 1950s McCarthyism and the Hollywood blacklist, the AEA refused to participate. Although its constitution guaranteed its members the right to refuse to work alongside Communists, or a member of a Communist front organization, the AEA did not ban any members. At a 1997 ceremony commemorating the blacklist's 50th anniversary, Richard Masur, then president of the Screen Actors Guild, apologized for its participation in the ban, saying: "Only our sister union, Actors' Equity Association, had the courage to stand behind its members and help them continue their creative lives in the theater. For that, we honor Actors' Equity tonight."

In the 1960s, the AEA played a role in gaining public funding for the arts, including the founding of the National Endowment for the Arts (NEA).

The AEA fought the destruction of historic Broadway theaters. It played a major role in the recognition of the impact the AIDS epidemic on the world of theater, co-founding Broadway Cares/Equity Fights AIDS.

On October 30, 2025, the AEA initiated a labor strike against Trey Parker and Matt Stone's Casa Bonita restaurant in Lakewood, Colorado, where 57 AEA member employees have served as entertainers, after demanding better wages and safer working conditions.

== Joining ==
In 2021, Actor's Equity introduced an "Open Access" membership policy, whereby "any theatre worker who can demonstrate they have worked professionally as an actor or stage manager within Equity's geographical jurisdiction" may join the union. This opened eligibility to the union to theatre workers who had not previously worked for Equity employers. Theatre workers need to provide a copy of their contract and proof of pay. This policy was made permanent in 2023, superseding previous methods for earning eligibility to join Equity such as the Equity Membership Candidate (EMC) program.

Asides from Open Access, theatre workers may join Equity by being employed under an Equity contract, or by being a member of one of Equity's sister performing arts unions, the "Four A's": SAG-AFTRA, AGMA, AGVA or GIAA. Such applicants must have been a member of said sister union for at least one year, be a member in good standing of that union, have worked as a performer under the union's jurisdiction on a principal or "under-five" contract or at least three days of extra ("background") work, and must have completed non-union theatrical work.

== Contracts ==
The AEA has several different types of contract, with different rules associated with them. Each contract type deals with a specific type of theater venue or production type. These include, but are not limited to: Council of Resident Stock Theatres (CORST), Guest Artist, Letters of Agreement (LoA), League of Resident Theatres (LoRT) Small Professional Theatres (SPT), and Theatre for Young Audiences (TYA).

AEA actors and stage managers are not allowed to work in non-Equity houses or on any productions in which an Equity Agreement has not been signed anywhere within the AEA's jurisdiction.

== Equity waiver plan ==
The Equity Waiver Plan, originally implemented in 1972, was designed to support small theaters in Los Angeles by allowing non-union actors to perform in venues with 99 seats or fewer, offering lower pay scales and flexible production terms. Initially, actors were paid between $5 and $14 per performance, with productions exceeding 80 performances required to transition to a union contract. The plan fueled the growth of small theaters and spurred artistic achievement in the region. However, by 2000, AEA shifted the focus from box office earnings to theater size to determine payments for the first 12 weeks of a production. A 2014 survey revealed dissatisfaction among members, with many feeling the plan favored producers over actors. Despite these criticisms, the plan helped many small theaters evolve into midsize operations paying higher wages.

== Presidents ==
- 1913–1920 Francis Wilson
- 1920–1928 John Emerson
- 1924 (June 17 – August 12) Ralph Morgan (acting president)
- 1928–1937 Frank Gillmore
- 1937–1938 Burgess Meredith (acting president)
- 1938–1940 Arthur Byron
- 1940–1946 Bert Lytell
- 1946–1952 Clarence Derwent
- 1952–1964 Ralph Bellamy
- 1964–1973 Frederick O'Neal
- 1973–1982 Theodore Bikel
- 1982–1985 Ellen Burstyn
- 1985–1991 Colleen Dewhurst
- 1991–2000 Ron Silver
- 2000–2006 Patrick Quinn
- 2006–2009 Mark Zimmerman
- 2009–2010 Paige Price (acting president)
- 2010–2015 Nick Wyman
- 2015–2024 Katherine Shindle
- 2024–present Brooke Shields

== Awards ==
Each year, the organization bestows eight awards, mainly awarded for classical theatre:

- Joe A. Callaway Award, for best performance in a leading role in a classical theatre production
- St. Clair Bayfield Award, for the best performance in a supporting role in a classical theatre production
- Clarence Derwent Awards, for the most promising performance in a supporting role in a classical theatre production
- Paul Robeson Award, for an organization that best exemplifies and practices the principles and ideals of this great humanitarian, Paul Robeson
- Patrick Quinn Award, for distinguished service to actors
- Richard Seff Award, for the best performance in a lead or supporting role in a classical theatre production by an actor age 50+
- Roger Sturtevant Musical Theatre Award, for outstanding abilities in musical theatre
- Michael McCarty Recognition Award, honoring a member of the union over the age of 50 residing in Los Angeles

== See also ==
- American Federation of Television and Radio Artists
- Canadian Actors' Equity Association
- Clarence Derwent Awards
- Equity, union in the United Kingdom
- Legacy Robe
- Paul Robeson Award
- Philip Loeb Humanitarian Award
- St. Clair Bayfield Award
- Stage Managers' Association
- Joe A. Callaway Award
