= Eric Johnston =

American businessman (1896–1963)

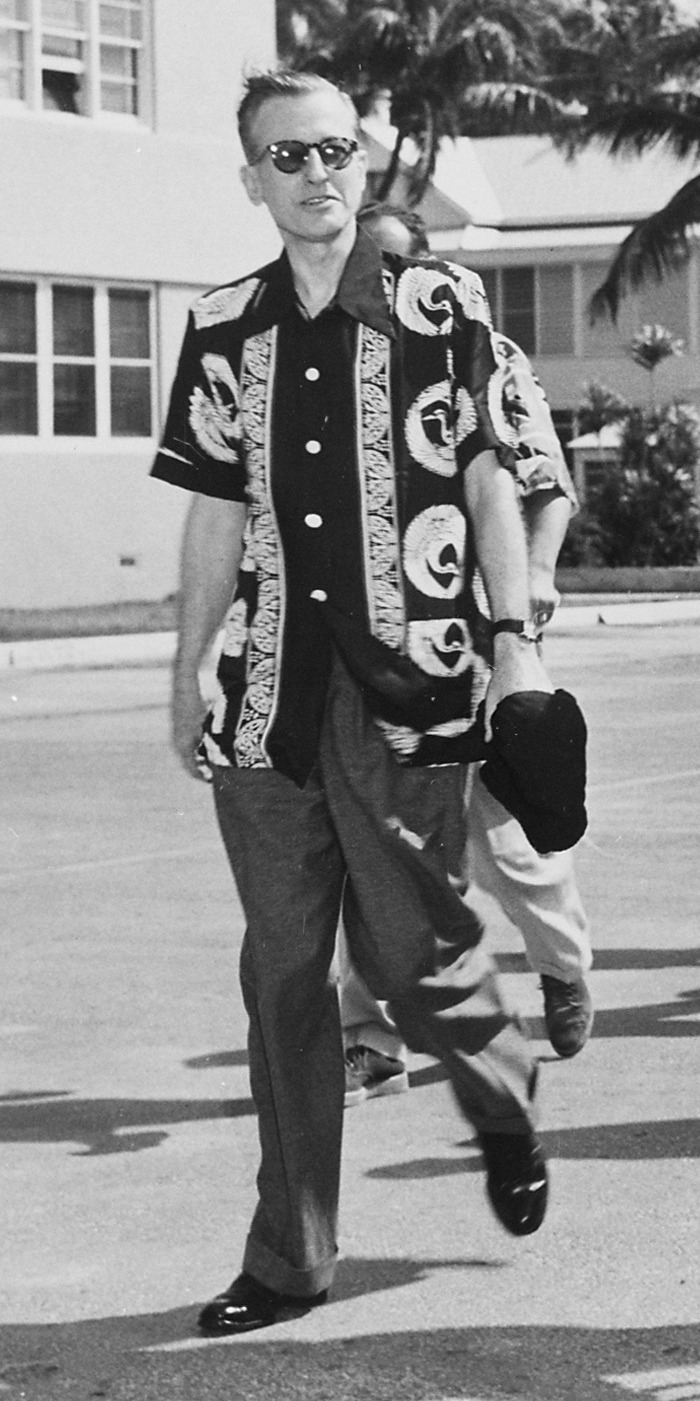
- Johnston in 1951
- Born: Eric Allen Johnson; December 21, 1896; Washington, D.C., U.S.
- Died: August 22, 1963 (aged 66); Washington, D.C., U.S.
- Occupation: Entrepreneur
- Employer(s): United States Chamber of Commerce, Motion Picture Association of America
- Spouse: Ina Hughes Johnston
- Awards: Presidential Medal for Merit (1947)

Eric Allen Johnston (December 21, 1896 – August 22, 1963) was a business owner, president of the United States Chamber of Commerce, a Republican Party activist, president of the Motion Picture Association of America (MPAA), and a U.S. government special projects administrator and envoy for both Democratic and Republican administrations. As president of the MPAA, he abbreviated the organization's name, convened the closed-door meeting of motion picture company executives at New York City's Waldorf-Astoria Hotel that led to Waldorf Statement in 1947 and the Hollywood blacklist (including firing of the Hollywood Ten), and discreetly liberalized the Motion Picture Production Code. He served as president of the MPAA until his death in 1963.

== Background ==
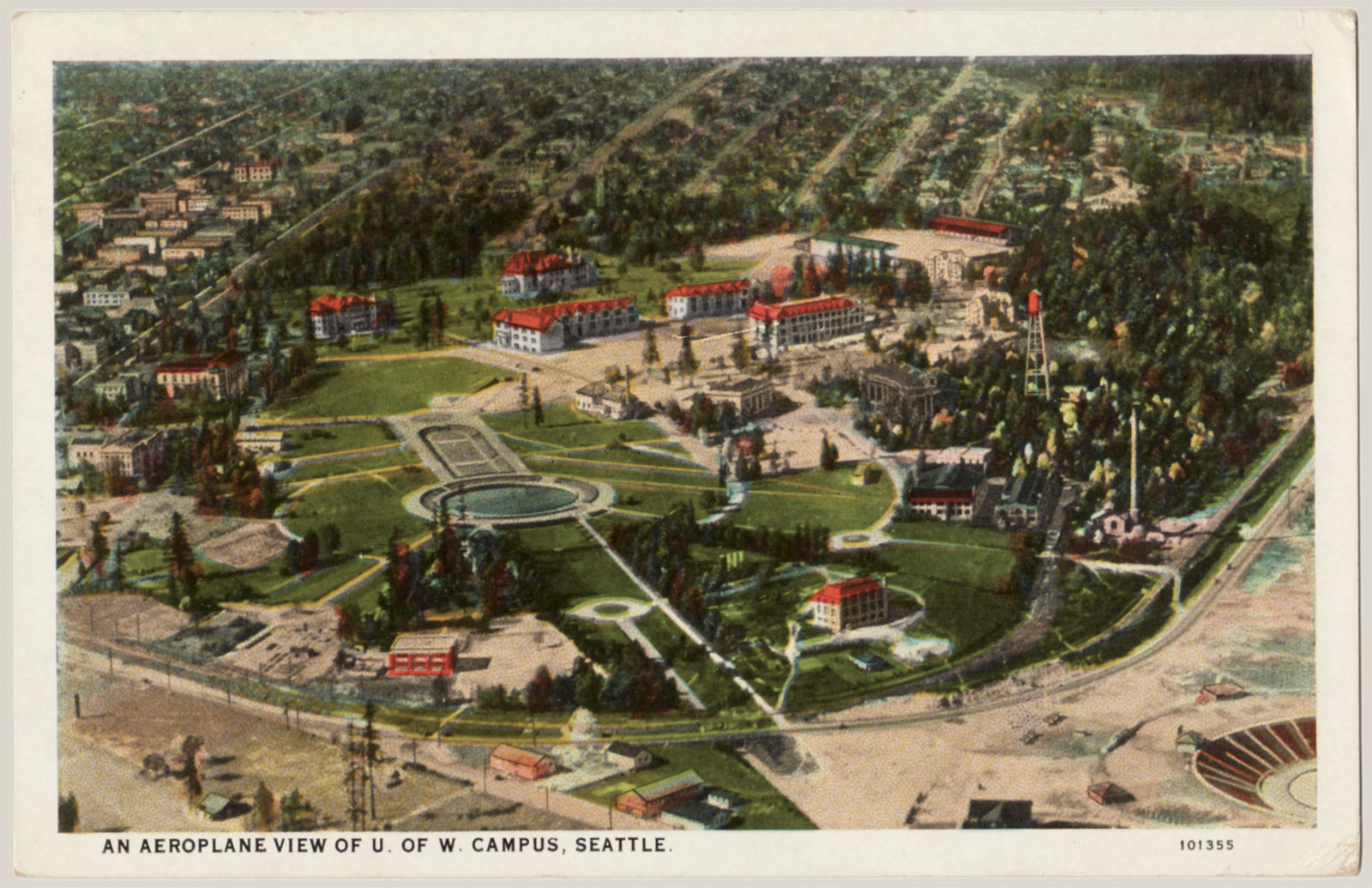
Johnston studied at the University of Washington (here, aerial view, circa 1922)

An Episcopalian, Johnston was born "Eric Johnson" in Washington, D.C. His father, a pharmacist, moved the family to Marysville, Montana, when Johnston was a year old. In 1905, the family moved to Spokane, Washington. The Johnsons divorced in 1911, and Eric's mother, Ida, changed her and her son's last name to "Johnston."

He attended the University of Washington, where he joined the Theta Delta Chi fraternity and graduated in 1917. During this time, he worked as a stevedore, newspaper sports columnist, library clerk, and shoe salesman.

== Career ==
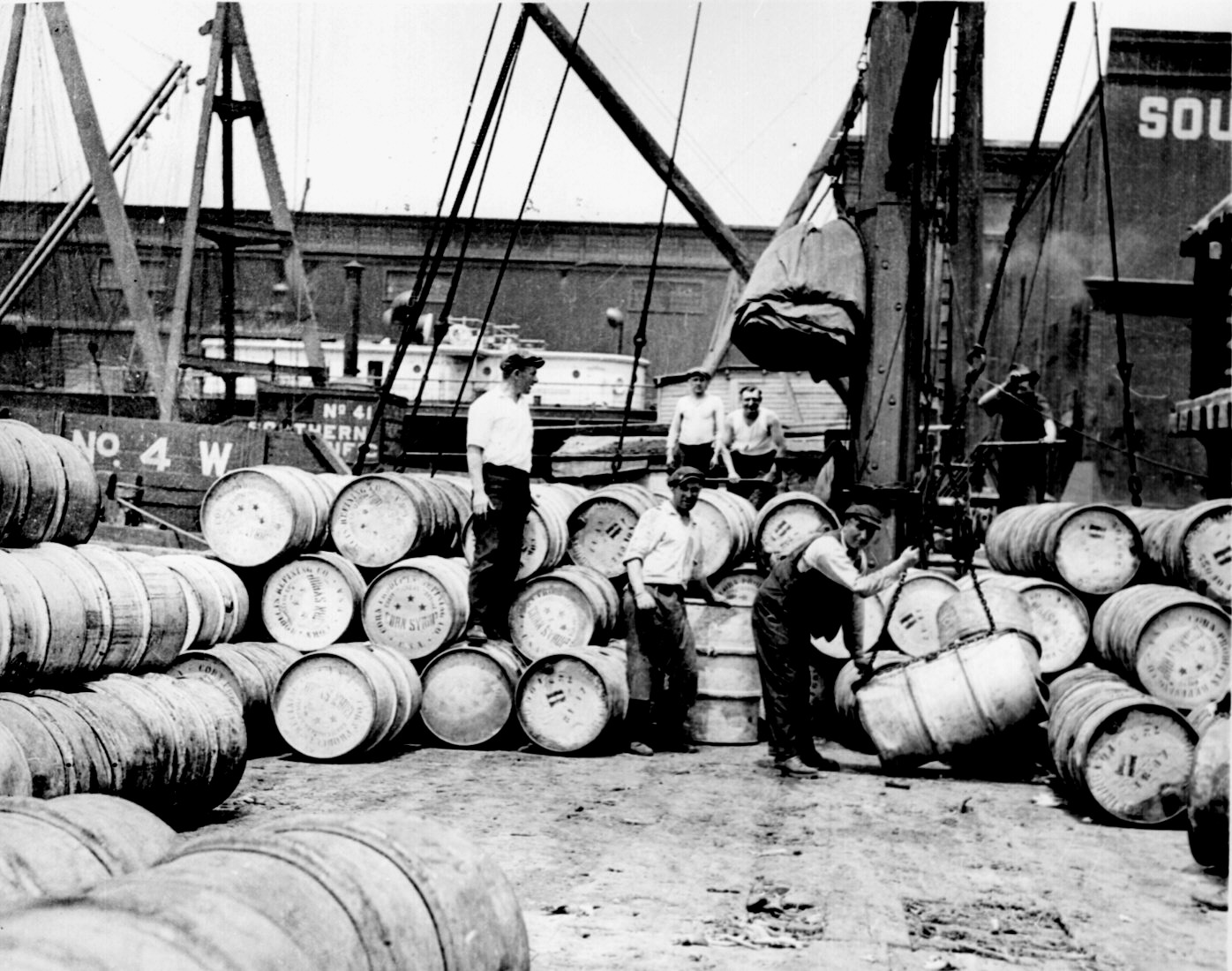
To pay for college, Johnston worked in many jobs, including stevedore (here, longshoremen on a New York dock load barrels of corn syrup onto a barge on the Hudson River, photographed by Lewis Hine circa 1912)

When the United States entered World War I, Johnston enlisted in the United States Marine Corps. He was commissioned a second lieutenant, and became a Reserve Officers' Training Corps commander at the University of Washington in 1918. He was promoted to captain, fought with the American Expeditionary Force, Siberia in the Russian Revolution, and was named military attaché in Peking (now Beijing). Johnston acquired some Mandarin, traveled widely in Asia, and successfully speculated in Chinese currency.

While in Beijing, Johnston was assaulted by an unknown person. His skull was fractured, which led to sinus infections and lung ailments and his discharge from the Corps in 1922 for medical reasons. Johnston returned to Spokane for its dry climate, where he married his long-time girlfriend, Ina Hughes. He became a vacuum-cleaner salesman, and bought the Power Brown Co., the Pacific Northwest's largest independent appliance distribution business. In 1924, the newly renamed Brown-Johnston Company purchased the Doerr-Mitchell Electric Co., a manufacturer of electrical appliances, ironwork and glassware.

Johnston was elected president of the Spokane Chamber of Commerce in 1931. He became managing trustee of the bankrupt Washington Brick and Lime Co., led it out of bankruptcy, and became its chairman. Johnston also became president of the Wayne-Burnaby Company, a regional electrical contractor.

=== US Chamber of Commerce ===
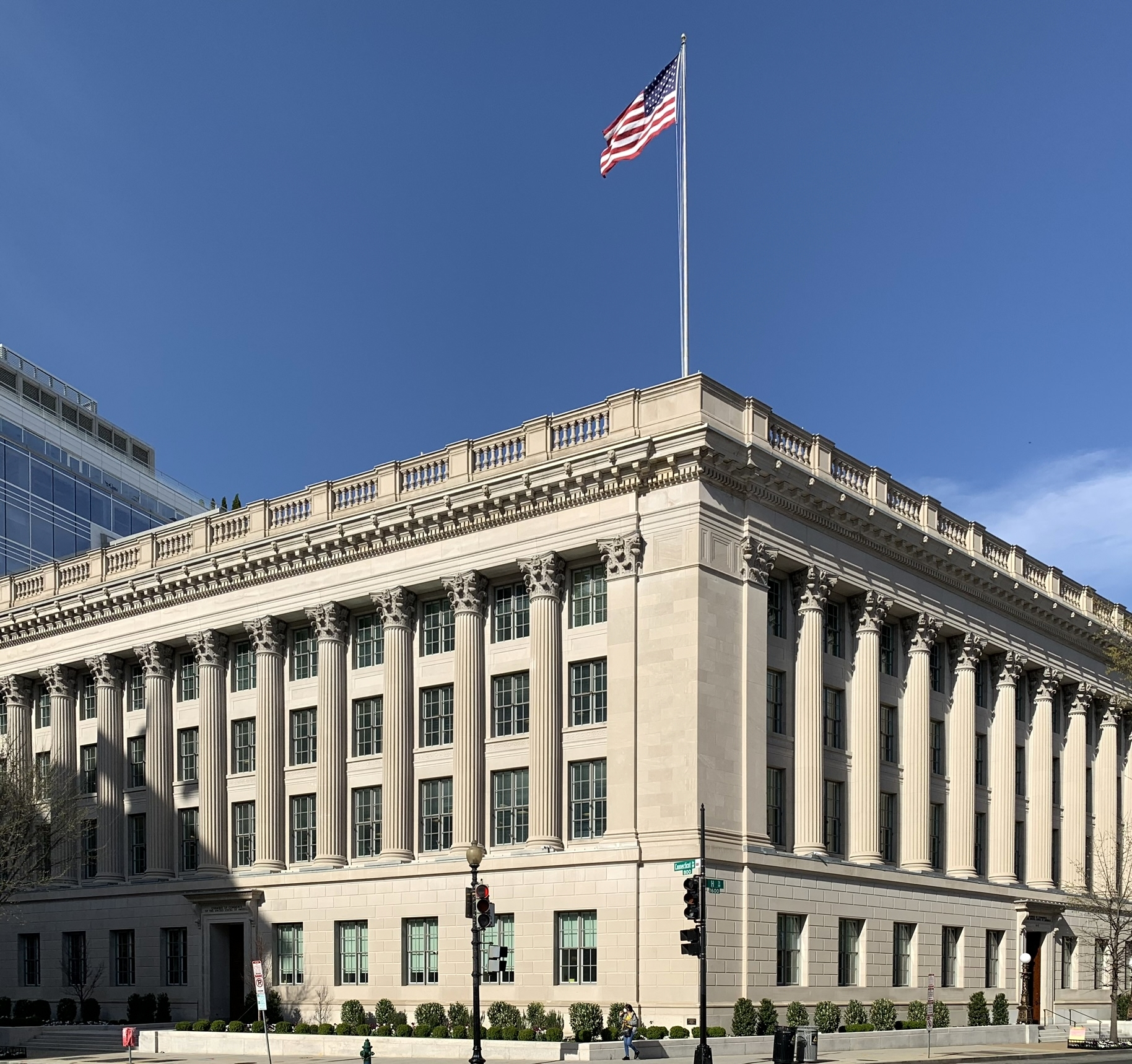
Johnston was president of the United States Chamber of Commerce (here, circa 2008) from 1942 through 1945

As a rising regional businessman, Johnston became active in the national Chamber of Commerce. He was appointed to its tax committee in 1933, elected a director in 1934, and elected vice president in 1941. Johnston became head of the U.S. Chamber of Commerce after a revolt by younger, moderate business executives pushed several older, conservative candidates aside. He refused to antagonize the American Federation of Labor or the Congress of Industrial Organizations, and advocated labor-management cooperation. Johnston persuaded the labor federations to make a no-strike pledge during World War II.

In 1940, Johnston ran in the Republican primary for Senator from Washington state, but placed a distant second place with only 18 percent of the vote.

In 1941, Johnston became the youngest person ever elected as president for its one-year term, re-elected three times. In 1942, Johnston took over as president of the US Chamber of Commerce. He served on several wartime commissions for President Franklin D. Roosevelt, including the Committee for Economic Development, the War Manpower Commission, and the War Mobilization and Reconversion Committee. In 1943, President Roosevelt named him chairman of the United States Commission on InterAmerican Development. He traveled widely in Latin America, reassuring heads of state that the United States intended to protect them in the event of war.

In 1944, Soviet leader Joseph Stalin invited Johnston to tour Russia. Johnston agreed, and Roosevelt appointed him an emissary of the United States. Johnston spent nearly a month in the Soviet Union, and was the first American diplomat to tour the Central Asian Republics of the Soviet Union. He met with Stalin for three hours at a time when Ambassador W. Averell Harriman had yet to present his credentials to the premier.

Johnston retired as Chamber of Commerce president in 1945.

=== MPAA ===
Johnston was named president of the Motion Picture Producers and Distributors Association (MPPDAA), the predecessor of the MPAA, in 1946. He immediately changed the name of the organization to its current title, the Motion Picture Association of America.

==== Hollywood blacklist ====
In September 1947, the motion picture industry came under sharp criticism by the House Un-American Activities Committee for allegedly permitting known communist sympathizers to include pro-communist messages in motion pictures. Spurred by Red-baiting members of the MPAA as well as a fear of government censorship, Johnston agreed to institute a blacklist.

On November 25, 1947, Johnston was part of a closed-door meeting with 47 motion picture company executives at New York City's Waldorf-Astoria Hotel that resulted in the "Waldorf Statement". Johnston issued a two-page press release that marked the beginning of the Hollywood blacklist.

==== Production code ====
During his tenure at the MPAA, Johnston quietly liberalized the production code. He also engaged in major initiatives to secure a significant American share of the overseas motion picture market, and to reduce restrictions on the screening of American films in foreign markets.

=== Government appointments ===
In January 1951, Johnston was appointed administrator of the Economic Stabilization Agency by President Harry S. Truman, replacing Alan Valentine. He lasted only a few months in the job.

In 1953, President Dwight D. Eisenhower appointed Johnston a "Special Representative of the President of the United States" to deal with the water conflict between Israel, Jordan, and Syria. He worked to solve the Middle East's water problems by negotiating the Jordan Valley Unified Water Plan.

In 1958, Johnston traveled to the Soviet Union and met Premier Nikita Khrushchev. In 1959, he hosted Khrushchev in both Washington, D.C., and California during Khrushchev's 18-day visit to the United States.

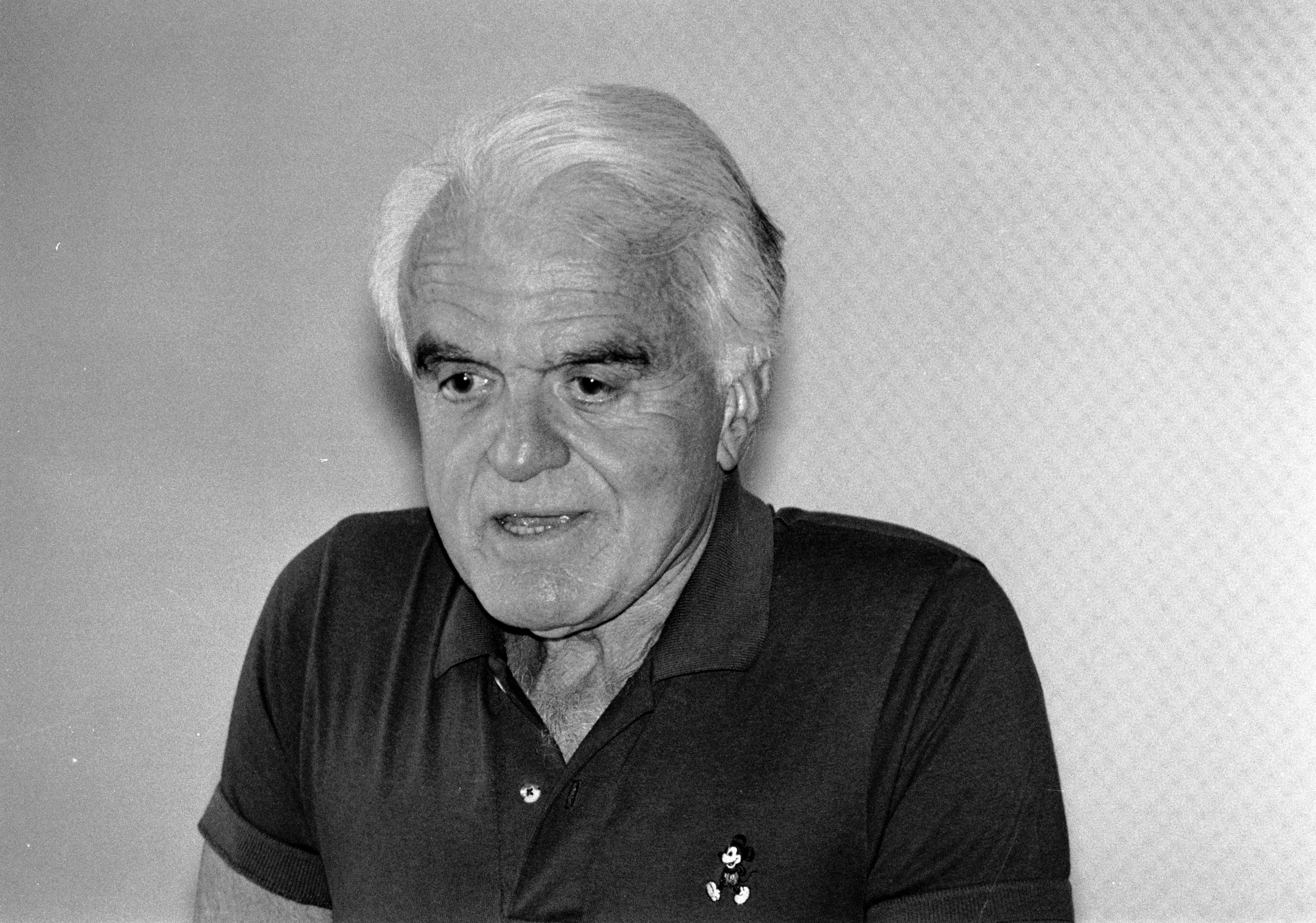
Jack Valenti succeeded Johnston as MPAA president

Johnston continued at MPAA until his death in 1963. He was succeeded at the MPAA by Jack Valenti in 1966 after a three-year search.

== Personal life and death ==
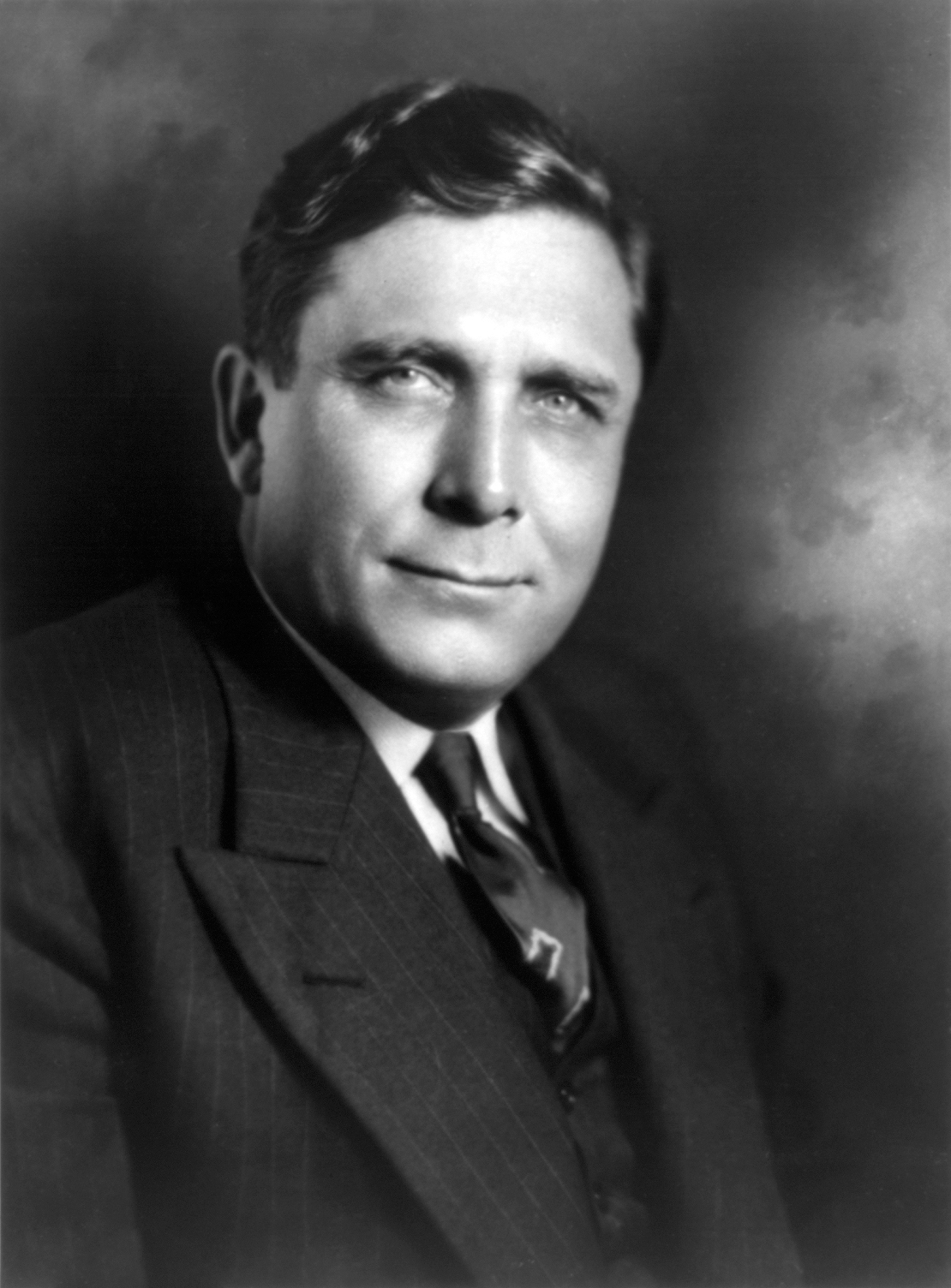
Johnston supported Wendell Willkie (here, 3 March 1940) during the 1940 Republican Party presidential primaries.

Johnston married Ina Harriet Hughes; they had two daughters.

During the 1940 Republican Party presidential primaries, Johnston support Wendell Willkie.

In 1963, while still MPAA president, Johnston suffered a stroke in Washington, D.C., on June 17. He was hospitalized at George Washington University Hospital, where he suffered a second stroke on July 4. He entered a coma on August 5 and died age 66 on August 22, 1963.

== Awards ==
- 1947: Presidential Medal for Merit

== Legacy ==
Johnston appears a key character in the play The Waldorf Conference, written by Nat Segaloff, Daniel M. Kimmel, and Arnie Reisman. The play presents a fictionalized account of the Waldorf Conference of 1947 and the beginning of the Hollywood blacklist.

Non-profit organization positions
Preceded by William H. Hays	Chairman of the Motion Picture Association of America; 1945-1963	Succeeded by Jack Valenti
