= Waldorf Statement =

Press release by MPAA President Eric Johnston (1947)

The Waldorf Statement was a two-page press release issued on 25 November 1947, by Eric Johnston, president of the Motion Picture Association of America, following a closed-door meeting by forty-eight motion picture company executives at New York City's Waldorf-Astoria Hotel. The Statement was a response to the contempt of Congress charges against the so-called "Hollywood Ten".

== Participants ==
The names of the 48 men who attended the meeting at the Waldorf-Astoria Hotel were printed in the Motion Picture Herald and Daily Variety, the film industry's primary trade publications. The principal participants who formulated the Waldorf Statement included:

- Louis B. Mayer: Metro-Goldwyn-Mayer
- Harry Cohn: Columbia Pictures
- Spyros Skouras: 20th Century Fox
- Nicholas Schenck: Loews Theatres
- Barney Balaban: Paramount Pictures
- Samuel Goldwyn: Samuel Goldwyn Company
- Albert Warner: Warner Bros.
- William Goetz: Universal-International
- Eric Johnston: Association of Motion Picture Producers and Motion Picture Association of America
- Mendel Silberberg: lawyer for Association of Motion Picture Producers
- James F. Byrnes: former United States Secretary of State
- Dore Schary: RKO Pictures

== Text ==
Members of the Association of Motion Picture Producers deplore the action of the 10 Hollywood men who have been cited for contempt by the House of Representatives. We do not desire to prejudge their legal rights, but their actions have been a disservice to their employers and have impaired their usefulness to the industry.

We will forthwith discharge or suspend without compensation those in our employ, and we will not re-employ any of the 10 until such time as he is acquitted or has purged himself of contempt and declares under oath that he is not a Communist.

On the broader issue of alleged subversive and disloyal elements in Hollywood, our members are likewise prepared to take positive action.

We will not knowingly employ a Communist or a member of any party or group which advocates the overthrow of the government of the United States by force or by any illegal or unconstitutional methods.

In pursuing this policy, we are not going to be swayed by hysteria or intimidation from any source. We are frank to recognize that such a policy involves danger and risks. There is the danger of hurting innocent people. There is the risk of creating an atmosphere of fear. Creative work at its best cannot be carried on in an atmosphere of fear. We will guard against this danger, this risk, this fear.

To this end we will invite the Hollywood talent guilds to work with us to eliminate any subversives: to protect the innocent; and to safeguard free speech and a free screen wherever threatened.

The absence of a national policy, established by Congress, with respect to the employment of Communists in private industry makes our task difficult. Ours is a nation of laws. We request Congress to enact legislation to assist American industry to rid itself of subversive, disloyal elements.

Nothing subversive or un-American has appeared on the screen, nor can any number of Hollywood investigations obscure the patriotic services of the 30,000 loyal Americans employed in Hollywood who have given our government invaluable aid to war and peace.
