= American Guild of Musical Artists =

Trade union

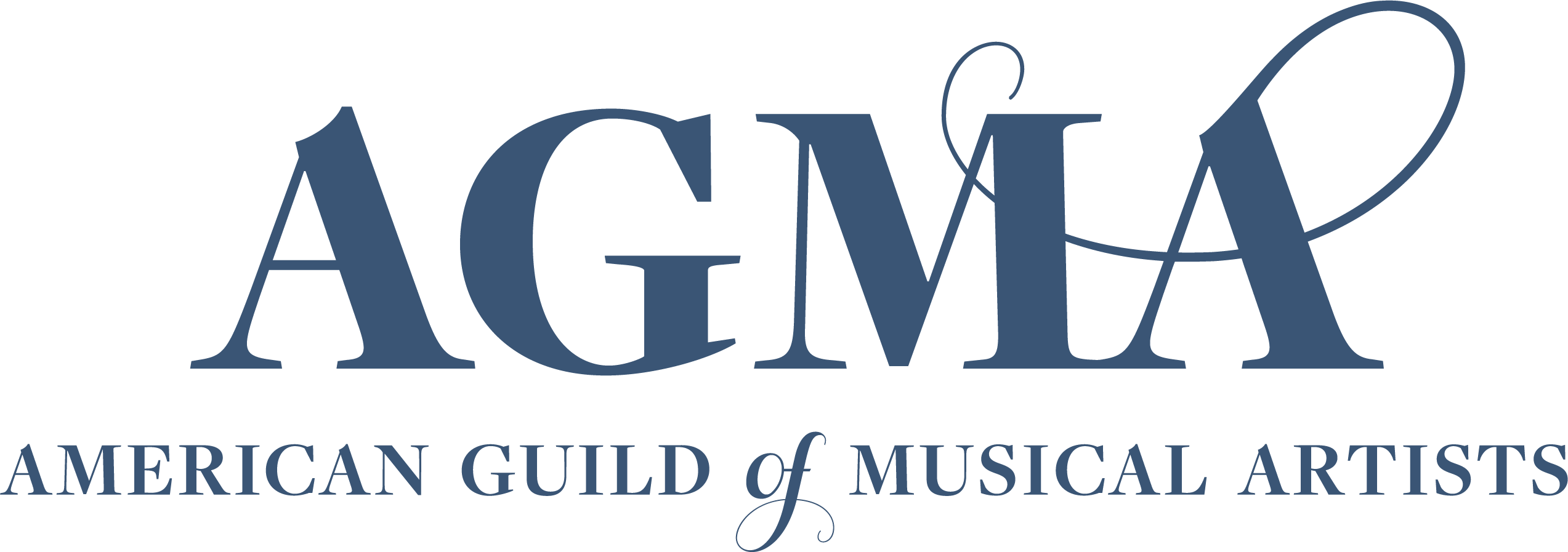
- Abbreviation: AGMA
- Formation: 1936; 90 years ago
- Type: Trade union
- Headquarters: New York City, New York, US
- Location: United States
- Members: 6,500
- President: Ned Hanlon
- Executive director: Jeffrey Boyd
- Affiliations: AFL–CIO
- Website: musicalartists.org

The American Guild of Musical Artists (AGMA) is the labor union of singers, dancers, and staging staff in opera, ballet and contemporary dance, and concert choral performance in the United States. A national union with a membership of over 6,500 artists, AGMA provides forceful advocacy and defense of its members' employment and artistic rights. AGMA negotiates and enforces approximately 70 collective bargaining agreements throughout the country, ensuring fair and safe working conditions and enhancing the quality of life of its members. AGMA has a direct charter from the AFL–CIO and is affiliated with the AFL–CIO Branch of Associated Actors and Artists of America and the Department for Professional Employees (DPE). AGMA is also a part of the Coalition of Broadway Unions and Guilds (COBUG).

== Jurisdiction ==
The American Guild of Musical Artists (AGMA) negotiates and enforces over 65 collective bargaining agreements throughout the country, ensuring fair and safe working conditions and enhancing the quality of life of its members. AGMA claims exclusive jurisdiction over all aspects of the work of its members and shares some Broadway jurisdiction with its fellow union, Actors' Equity Association.

== History ==
AGMA was founded in 1936 in an effort to protect opera singers who were being forced into unfair contracts without benefits or protections. Over the years, the union expanded its jurisdiction to include dancers, choristers, and staging staff.
