= American Guild of Variety Artists =

Entertainment union

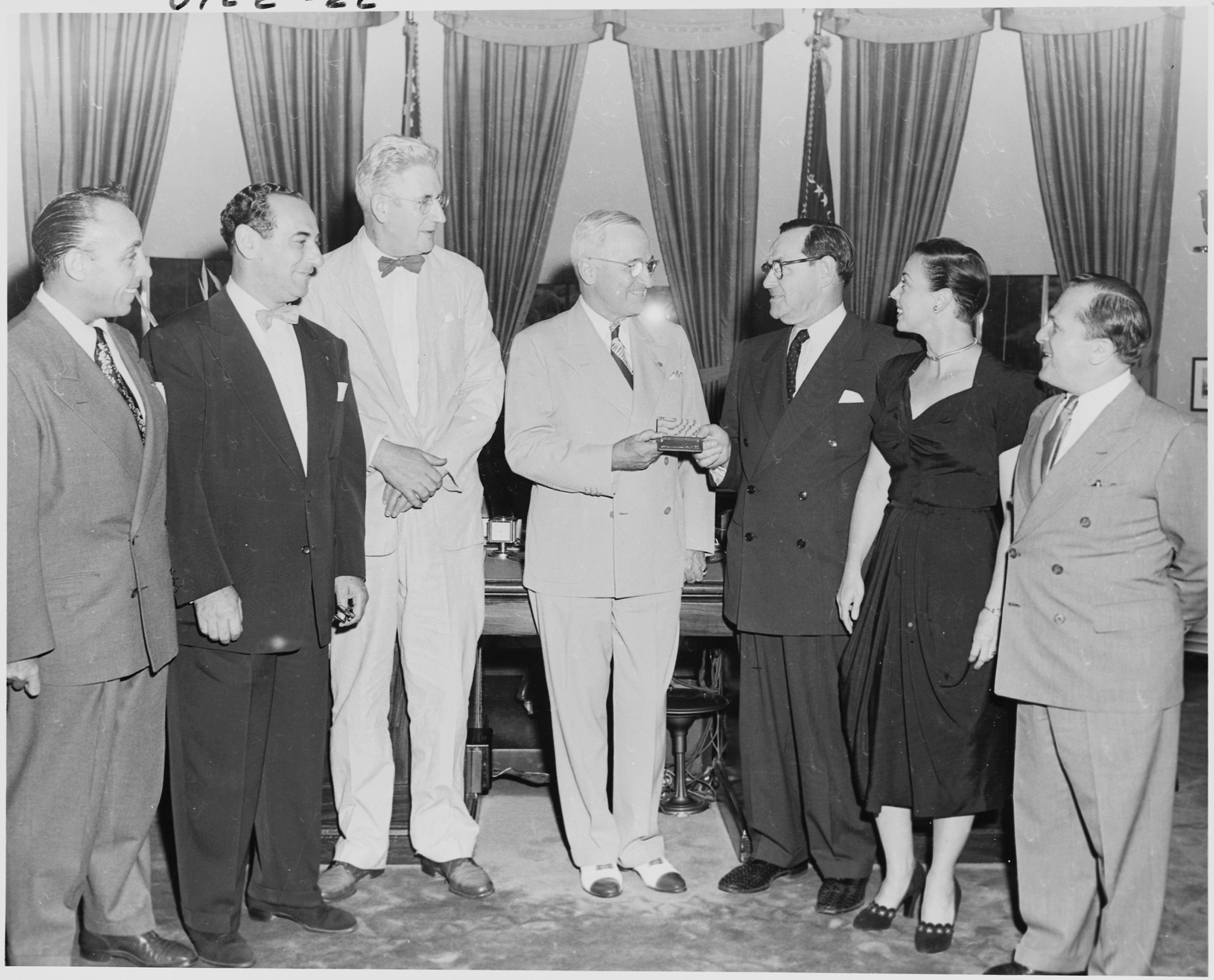
- President Harry Truman receives an honorary AGVA membership card, 1949
- Abbreviation: AGVA
- Predecessor: American Federation of Actors
- Formation: 1939; 87 years ago
- Type: Trade union
- Headquarters: New York City, US
- Location: United States
- Members: 2,624 (2014)
- Affiliations: AFL-CIO; Associated Actors and Artistes of America
- Website: agvausa.com

The American Guild of Variety Artists (AGVA) is an American entertainment union representing performers in variety entertainment, including circuses, Las Vegas showrooms and cabarets, comedy showcases, dance revues, magic shows, theme park shows, and arena and auditorium extravaganzas. There is some overlap between the jurisdictions of AGVA and Actors' Equity.

== History ==
In early August 1940, Dewey Barto was named president of AGVA, succeeding Jay Flippen who had resigned earlier. Barto resigned as president of the AGVA in February 1941, which led to the Associated Actors and Artistes of America (4As) assuming operational control of AGVA.

Barto was again elected to the board of the AGVA to represent the New York local in May 1941. When AGVA achieved independence from the Associated Actors and Artistes of America in November 1948, Barto was unanimously drafted by AGVA's national board to become its National Administrative Secretary. He announced his intention to resign the position in November 1949.

In 1963, then-AGVA president Joey Adams helped to finance and organize an August 5 variety show in Birmingham, Alabama, to raise funds for the August 28 March on Washington for Jobs and Freedom. Sharing the stage with Martin Luther King Jr. were Ray Charles, Nina Simone, Joe Louis, Johnny Mathis, James Baldwin and The Shirelles.

In 1958–59, the actress, singer, and tap dancer Penny Singleton became the first woman elected president of an AFL-CIO union. She was active in supporting the 1967 strike of the AGVA-represented Rockettes against Radio City Music Hall, and was re-elected to the AGVA presidency in 1969. The most recent executive president was poet, songwriter, composer, and singer Rod McKuen, who held the post for 19 years until his death in 2015. As of the September 2021 vote count, the honorary president was Tommy Tune, the honorary vice-president was Barry Humphries, and the executive president was Judy Little.

AGVA was the successor to the American Federation of Actors organized by actress and singer Sophie Tucker and others in the late 1930s, and affiliated with the American Federation of Labor. In 1939 the AFL dissolved the AFA due to financial irregularities, and issued a new charter to AGVA (although some members went to Equity instead).

In 2022, AGVA began organizing performers with Medieval Times, leading to a labor strike in 2023 at the Buena Park, California, location. However, the strike ended without a labor contract, and in March 2024, facing anti-union backlash, the union announced that they would not be representing Medieval Times employees.

AGVA's offices are in New York and Los Angeles.

== Statistics ==
Membership (US records)
View chart definition.
Finances (US records; ×$1000)
View chart definition.

== Georgie Award ==
AGVA Entertainer of the Year Awards, or the "Georgie Award" (after George M. Cohan), for variety performer of the year. Some of the past winners include:

- ABBA – Best Vocal Group of the Year, 1980
- Barbra Streisand – multiple awards
- Sonny & Cher – multiple awards

== See also ==
- Danish Artist Union
- Variety Artistes' Federation
