= Chorus Equity Association =

Marie Dressler, Ethel Barrymore & others during the 1919 strike

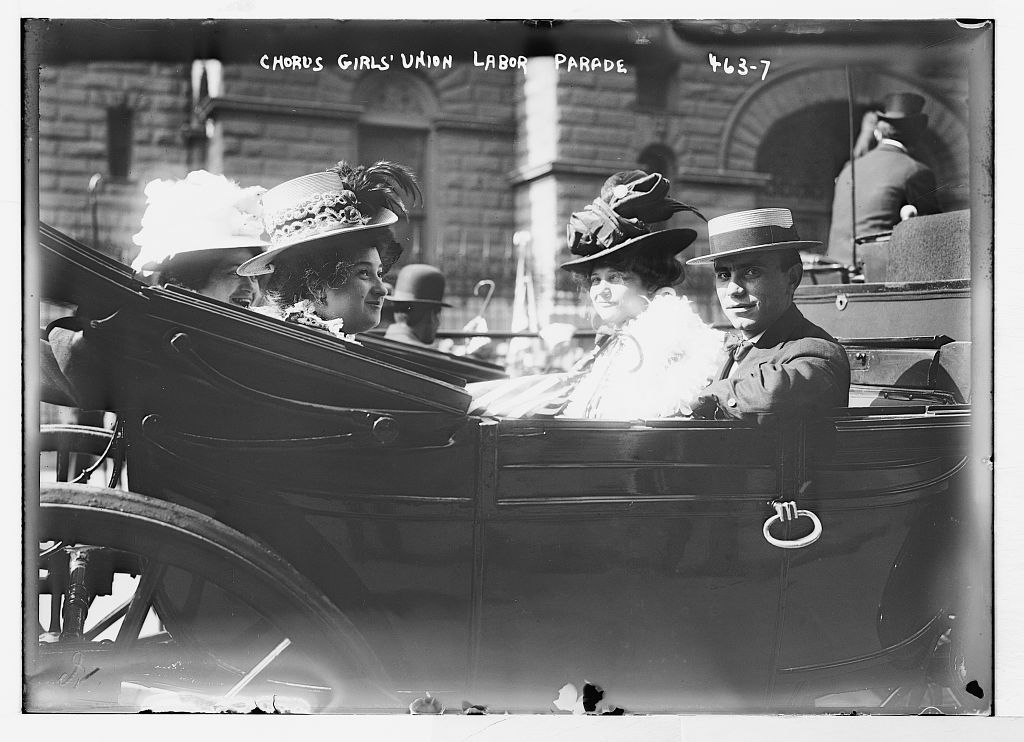
Parade

The Chorus Equity Association was created on August 12, 1919, in New York City during the strike by the Actors' Equity Association. After Florenz Ziegfeld revealed that he was joining the Producing Managers' Association, the chorus girls in his Ziegfeld Follies created their own union, with the help of a substantial donation from the superstar actress and former chorus girl Lillian Russell.

Marie Dressler, another former chorus girl who had gone on to be a major star on the stage, was elected the association's first president. She led them to join the strike, spearheading a march down Broadway in solidarity with Actors' Equity.

The Chorus Equity Association merged into the Actors' Equity Association in 1955.
