= Stage Managers' Association =

The Stage Managers' Association, or SMA, is a professional association for stage managers in the United States. It was founded in 1982 in New York City, with four major regional centers in the East, West, Central and New York metropolitan area. The organization represents more than 1000 American stage managers in dance, theatre, opera, concerts, and other entertainment events. Many of its members are represented by the 4 A's unions. It also represents American Stage Management abroad, with an international cohort which connects its members to stage managers around the globe.

The Stage Managers' Association annually presents the Del Hughes Award as a for lifetime achievement in stage management.
