= Guild of Italian American Actors =

American trade union for actors

- Abbreviation: GIAA
- Formation: December 20, 1937; 88 years ago
- Type: Trade union
- Headquarters: New York City, New York, US
- Location: United States
- Members: 79 (2013)
- President: Carlo Fiorletta
- Affiliations: Associated Actors and Artistes of America
- Website: sites.google.com/view/giaa/
- Formerly called: Italian Actors Union

The Guild of Italian American Actors (GIAA) was founded in 1937 as the Italian Actors Union (IAU) to protect the rights of Italian-American actors in Italian-language theater and was reinvented as GIAA, the Guild of Italian American Actors by then-president Paul Borghese in 1998. Borghese served as president from 1998 to 2002 and currently serves as president emeritus. He took a dying union of 67 members to a membership of 500 actors, directors, and writers. The guild has jurisdiction over Italian-language professional theater, and works to preserve and promote awareness of Italian culture and heritage. GIAA also provides a casting resource to directors and producers seeking Italian-American actors.

== GIAA Festival of Short Films and Videos ==
GIAA Festival of Short Films and Videos was an annual film festival and award ceremony celebrating successful short films and videos, as well as scripts. Winners receive awards including the 'GIAA: Italian American Heritage Award', and awards for the best actor, actress, documentary, and animation. An Audience Favorite award was added in 2008. In 2012 the festival was discontinued after five years and there is no current plan to restart it.

== Controversy ==
GIAA was barred from marching in the Columbus Day Parade in 2002 because it refused to give to parade organizers a list of members who appeared on The Sopranos.

== Membership and finances ==
Membership (US records)
View source data.
Finances (US records)
View source data.

== See also ==
- List of Italian-American actors
