= 2007–08 Writers Guild of America strike =

American media labor dispute

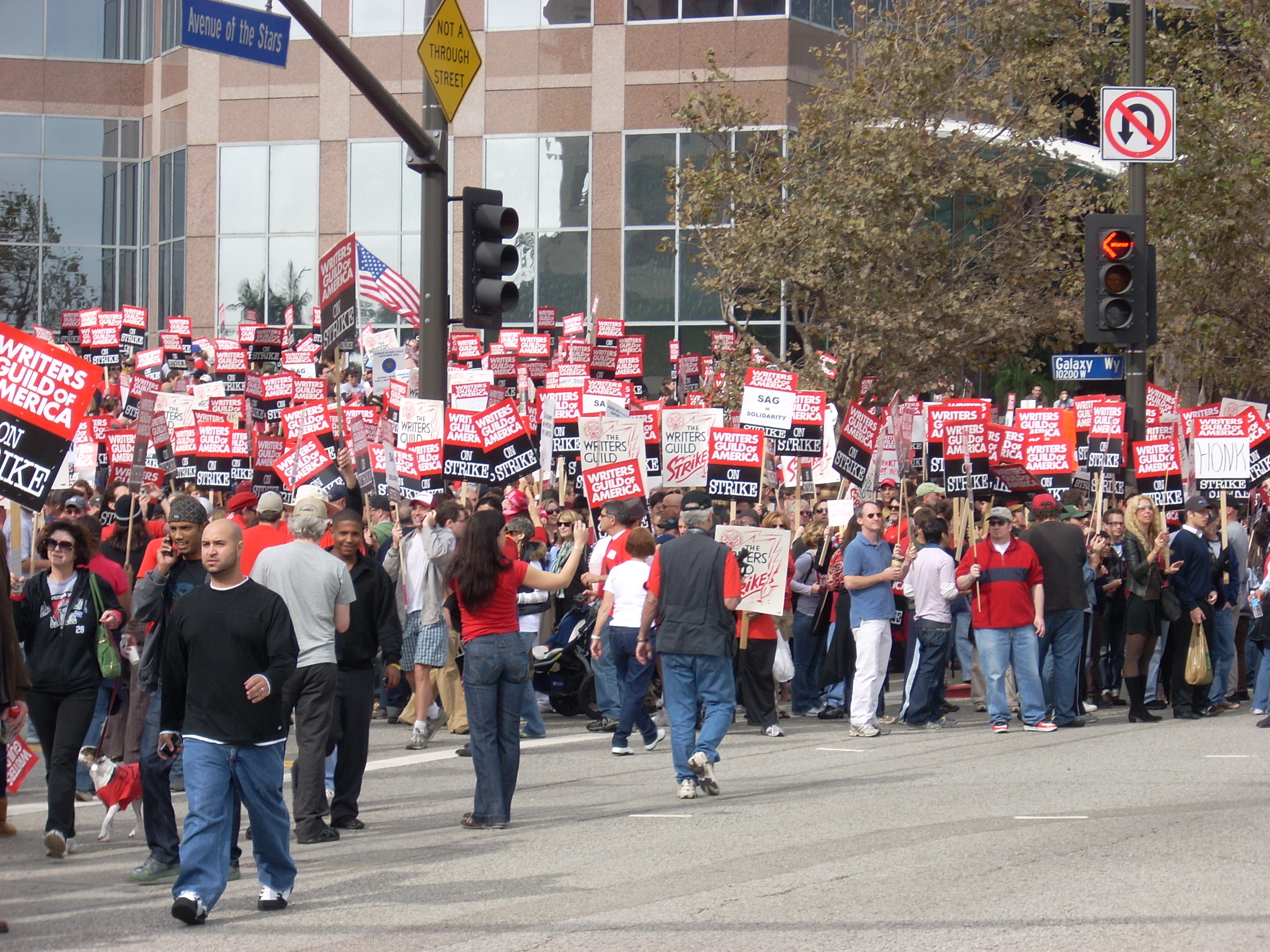
- Striking WGA members at Fox Plaza, Los Angeles, on November 7, 2007
- Date: November 5, 2007 – February 12, 2008 (3 months and 7 days, or 99 days)
- Location: United States
- Caused by: Lack of agreement on a new contract between Writers Guild of America and AMPTP
- Goals: Increased DVD residuals, jurisdiction over, and residuals from, new media
- Methods: Picketing, protest
- Result: Agreement to end strike reached on February 12, 2008

Parties
Writers Guild of America, East; Writers Guild of America West	AMPTP

From November 5, 2007, to February 12, 2008, all 12,000 film and television screenwriters of the American labor unions Writers Guild of America, East (WGAE), and Writers Guild of America West (WGAW) went on strike.

The Writers Guild of America (WGA) strike primarily sought increased residual rates for DVD sales as well as jurisdiction over and residuals from new media. It was targeted at the Alliance of Motion Picture and Television Producers (AMPTP), a trade association representing the interests of 397 American film and television producers. The most influential of these were eleven corporations: CBS (Les Moonves), MGM (Harry E. Sloan), NBCUniversal (Jeff Zucker), The Weinstein Company (Harvey and Bob Weinstein), Lionsgate (Jon Feltheimer), News Corporation (Peter Chernin), Paramount Pictures (Brad Grey), Liberty Media/Starz (Chris McGurk), Sony Pictures (Michael Lynton), The Walt Disney Company (Bob Iger), and Warner Bros. (Barry Meyer).

Negotiators for the striking writers reached a tentative agreement on February 8, 2008, and the boards of both guilds unanimously approved the deal on February 10, 2008. Striking writers voted on February 12, 2008, on whether to lift the restraining order, with 92.5% voting to end the strike. On February 26, the WGA announced that the contract had been ratified with a 93.6% approval among WGA members. The Writers Guild later requested a court order seeking that the agreement be honored and implemented.

The guilds were on strike for 14 weeks and 2 days (100 days). In contrast, the previous strike in 1988, the longest in the history of the Guild, lasted 21 weeks and 6 days (153 days) and cost the American entertainment industry an estimated $500 million. According to a National Public Radio (NPR) report filed on February 12, 2008, the strike cost the economy of Los Angeles an estimated $1.5 billion. A report from the UCLA Anderson School of Management put the loss at $380 million, while economist Jack Kyser put the loss at $2.1 billion. The Milken Institute estimated the losses at $2.1 billion ($20 million per day) and 38,000 jobs.

The big win for the Writers Guild was jurisdiction over new media, which was precedent-setting. Streamers would have to hire WGA writers on shows over certain budgets. Other than that, they received a new percentage payment on the distributor's gross for digital distribution based on the deal that the WGA made during the strike.

== Issues in the strike ==
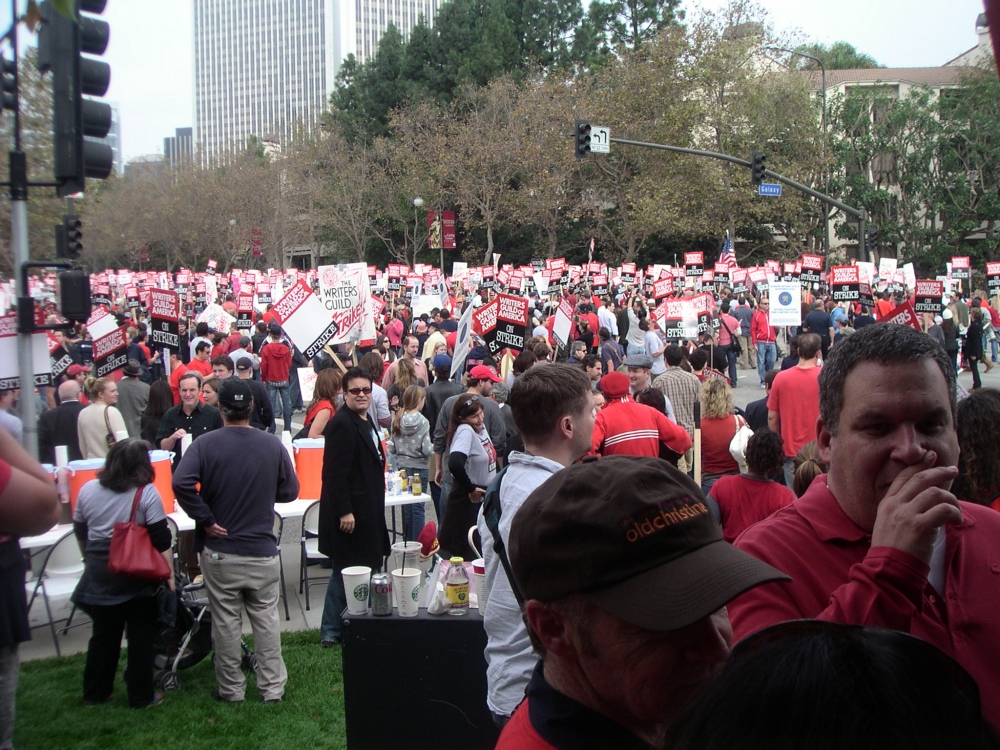
Writer-actor Jeff Garlin of Curb Your Enthusiasm (foreground, right) and others at a WGAW rally outside the Fox Studios in Los Angeles.

We are ready to meet at any time and remain committed to reaching a fair and reasonable deal that keeps the industry working, but the DVD issue is a roadblock to these negotiations.

— AMPTP president Nick Counter

Every issue that matters to writers, including Internet reuse, original writing for new media, DVDs, and jurisdiction, has been ignored. This is completely unacceptable.

— WGA Negotiating Committee

Every three years, the WGA negotiates a new basic contract with the AMPTP by which its members are employed. This contract is called the Minimum Basic Agreement (MBA). In 2007, negotiations over the MBA reached an impasse and the WGA membership voted to give its board authorization to call a strike, which it did on Friday, November 2, 2007; the strike began the following Monday, November 5, 2007.

Among the many proposals from both sides regarding the new contract, there were several key issues of contention including DVD residuals, union jurisdiction over animation and reality program writers, and compensation for "new media" (content written for or distributed through emerging digital technology such as the Internet).

=== DVD residuals ===
==== Background ====
In 1985, the Writers Guild went on strike over the home video market, which was then small and primarily consisted of distribution via video tape. At that time, the entertainment companies argued home video was an "unproven" market, with an expensive delivery channel (manufacturing VHS and Betamax tapes, and to a smaller extent, LaserDisc). Movies were selling in the range of between $40–$100 per tape, and the Guild accepted a formula in which a writer would receive 0.3% of the first million of reported gross (and 0.36% after) of each tape sold as a residual. As manufacturing costs for video tapes dropped and the home video market widened, writers came to feel they had been shortchanged by this deal. DVDs debuted in 1996 and rapidly replaced the more-expensive VHS format, outselling VHS for the first time on the week of June 15, 2003. The previous VHS residual formula continued to apply to DVDs.

Prior to the strike, the home video market had become the major source of revenue for the movie studios. In April 2004, The New York Times reported the companies made $4.8 billion in home video sales versus $1.78 billion at the box office between January and March.

==== Proposals ====
WGA members argued that a writer's residuals are a necessary part of a writer's income that is typically relied upon during periods of unemployment common in the writing industry. The WGA requested a doubling of the residual rate for DVD sales, which would result in a residual of 0.6% (up from 0.3%) per DVD sold.

The AMPTP maintained that studios' DVD income was necessary to offset rising production and marketing costs. They further insisted that the current DVD formula (0.3%) be applied to residuals in other digital media—an area which was also contested by the Writers Guild.

The WGA provisionally removed the increased DVD residual request from the table, in an effort to avert a strike and on the understanding of certain concessions by the AMPTP, the night before the strike began. However, after the strike began, WGAW President Patric Verrone wrote that the membership exhibited "significant disappointment and even anger" when they learned of the proposed removal of the request; and Verrone also wrote that, since the removal of the increased DVD residual request was contingent on concessions by the AMPTP which did not happen, the writers would and should continue to "fight to get our fair share of the residuals of the future."

==== Conclusion ====
There was no change to the calculation of DVD residuals.

=== New media ===
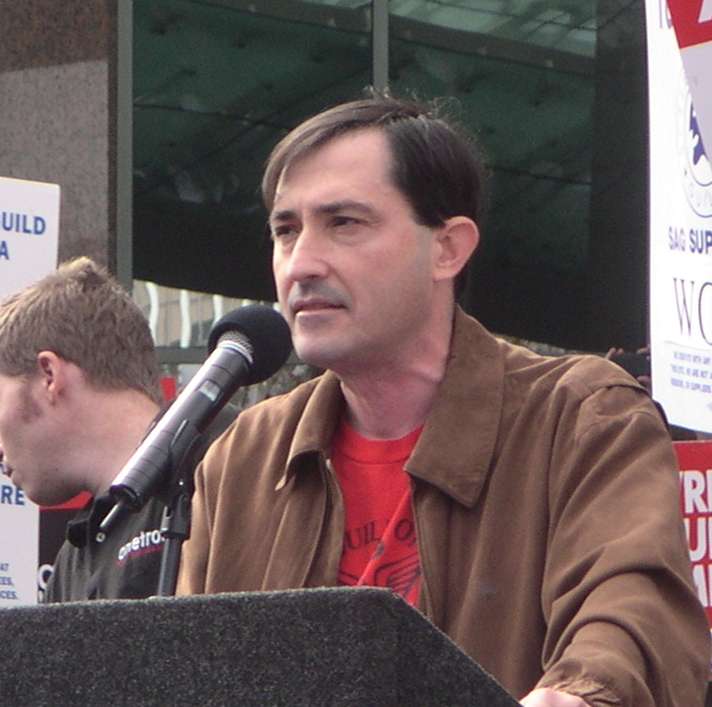
WGA West president and Futurama writer Patric Verrone speaks at a strike rally in Los Angeles.

Driven by the then-recent contract between Viacom and the creators of South Park, one of the critical issues for the negotiations was residuals for "new media", or compensation for delivery channels such as Internet downloads, IPTV, streaming, smartphone programming, straight-to-Internet content, and other "on-demand" online distribution methods, along with video on demand on cable and satellite television.

==== Background ====
Prior to the strike, the WGA had no arrangement with producers regarding the use of content online, and two models of internet distribution were negotiated. The first is "electronic sell-through" (also known as "internet sales" or "digital sell-through"). In electronic sell-through, the consumer purchases a copy of the program and downloads it to a local storage device for subsequent viewing at their convenience. Examples include movies and television shows purchased through the iTunes Store and Amazon Video on Demand. In the second model, "streaming video", the consumer watches a program in real time as it is transmitted to their computer but is usually not saved.

In either case, the program may be viewed directly on a computer or on a traditional television via media distribution devices (e.g. TiVo). The convenience of both these technologies lowers the barriers to entry into the digital distribution marketplace making it more accessible to mainstream consumers.

It was widely expected by industry observers that new media would eventually supplant both DVD in the home video market and television in the broadcasting market as the primary means for distribution. As in the mid-1980s, the companies argued that new media represents an unproven and untested market and asked for additional time for study. However, feeling resentment from the 20-year-old home video deal and unwilling to make similar concessions in a so-called "new market" yet again, WGA members remained adamant that whatever deal they made for new media, it could not resemble the DVD formula.

New media was widely seen by most WGA writers as the central issue for the strike. Writer-director Craig Mazin (Scary Movie 3) has dubbed new media "the One Issue" that matters.

This sentiment was further articulated by a self-described "skeptic", writer Howard Gould, at a meeting of the full WGA membership the night before the strike date was announced. He said, to a standing ovation:

Soon, when computers and your TV are connected, that's how we're all going to watch. Okay? Those residuals are going to go from what they are towards zero if we don't make a stand now. ... This is such a big issue that if they see us roll over on this without making a stand - three years from now, they're gonna be back for something else. ... I might have been the most moderate one up here when we started, but I sat there in the room the first day and they read us those thirty-two pages of rollbacks. And what they wanted us to hear was that "if you don't give us what [we] want on the important thing, we're gonna come after you for all those other things." But what I heard was, if we give them that thing, they'll still come after us for those other things. And in three years, it'll be "we want to revamp the whole residual system," and in another three years, it'll be "y'know what, we don't really want to fund the health fund the way we've been." And then it will be pension. And then it'll be credit determination. And there just is that time when everybody has to see—this is one where we just gotta stand our ground.

==== Conclusion ====
The WGA established the groundwork for Guild-covered writing in streaming, years before the technology changed the business. Once Netflix and Amazon began producing shows, they were obligated to hire Guild writers, because of the rules created in 2008. On back end, the WGA took the DGA's deal: For downloads, writers were granted 1.2% of distributor's gross receipts for rentals and 0.65%-0.7% of gross receipts. For ad supported streaming writers were granted 2% of gross receipts beyond the initial 17 days.

=== Jurisdiction in reality and animation ===
The WGA's membership of approximately 12,000 writers (more than 7,000 in WGAW and more than 4,000 in WGAE) primarily work on live-action, script-driven movies and television programs.

Exactly if and how the WGA's Minimum Basic Agreement (MBA) should apply to other TV and film categories such as reality television and animation had been inconsistent over the years and were an area of much dispute.

The WGA had been pushing for jurisdiction of reality and animation, but dropped these issues as the WGA and AMPTP entered into informal negotiations.

==== Background ====
The negotiations between the AMPTP and the WGA are at an impasse because the WGA has continued to press a series of unreasonable demands that have nothing to do with new media and the real concerns of most working writers.

— AMPTP statement: The State of the Strike: Day 47

Programs such as Real People and That's Incredible!, which were arguably "reality" shows of the 1980s, were covered by the MBA, whereas more recently produced reality shows such as Survivor and America's Next Top Model are not. Many producers of reality programming argue that since these shows are mostly, if not entirely, unscripted, there is no writer. The WGA counters that the process of creating interesting scenarios, culling raw material, and shaping it into a narrative with conflict, character arc, and storyline constitutes writing and should fall under its contract.

In the summer of 2006, the WGAW attempted to organize employees of America's Next Top Model. The employees voted to join the WGA, but then they were fired and production continued without them.

Animated films and TV programs have also been an area of heavy contention. The majority of animated film and television writing is not covered by the WGA's MBA. Most animated feature films have been written under the jurisdiction of another union, the International Alliance of Theatrical Stage Employees Local 839, also known as The Animation Guild. IATSE's jurisdiction stemmed from Walt Disney's tradition of creating an animated feature via storyboards written and drawn by storyboard artists. In the years up until the strike, most studios began hiring screenwriters to write script pages which are then storyboarded. According to the WGA, 100% of animated feature film screenplays in 2005 were written by at least one WGA member. Some animated features, such as Beowulf, were written under the WGA contract. The only animated television programs affected by the strike were Fox's The Simpsons, Family Guy, King of the Hill and American Dad!

The WGA and the IATSE have an ongoing disagreement as to which union should represent animation writers.

==== Proposals ====
Regarding reality programming, the WGA requested contract language clarifying that reality programming does fall under its jurisdiction. They further proposed the adoption of a credit, "Story Producer" and "Supervising Story Producer" to be given to those writers performing story contributions to a reality show.

As for animation, the WGA proposed clarifying its jurisdiction to cover all animation in TV and film that did not encroach on the jurisdiction of another union.

==== Conclusion ====
WGA president Patric Verrone announced that the reality and animation jurisdiction proposals were formally removed from the table.

== Negotiations and strike activity ==
The final negotiations between the WGA and AMPTP before the WGA's contracts expired on October 31, 2007, began on October 25, but the talks broke down due to the issues surrounding new-media royalties. After the contracts expired, the WGAW held a meeting at the Los Angeles Convention Center, which was attended by 3,000 WGAW members, and the negotiating committee formally recommended a strike, after which the WGAE and the WGAW officially announced that the strike would begin at 12:01 AM on November 5. In a last-ditch conciliation to try to avoid the strike, the WGA temporarily withdrew its DVD proposal on November 4, but the companies still insisted on a lack of residual for new media, and the talks subsequently broke down, with both sides accusing the other of walking out. Thus, on November 5, nearly 3,000 WGAW members, plus additional SAG and Teamsters members, picketed or refused to cross the picket lines at 14 targeted studios in Los Angeles, and many more Writers Guild of America, East picketers marched in locations in New York including Rockefeller Center. The picket lines continued, along with various rallies, throughout the strike period in both cities.

Following four days of targeted picketing, a large rally was held outside the Twentieth Century Fox Studios in Los Angeles on Friday, November 9, drawing an estimated 4,000 WGAW members and supporters, including a sizeable number of SAG members. Speakers included WGA West president Patric Verrone, Family Guy and American Dad! creator Seth MacFarlane, civil rights activist Jesse Jackson, and producer Norman Lear. The rally was opened with a two-song performance by Zack de la Rocha and Tom Morello (as The Nightwatchman) of Rage Against the Machine.

On November 16, 2007, both the WGA and the AMPTP made the following announcement: "Leaders from the WGA and the AMPTP have mutually agreed to resume formal negotiations on November 26. No other details or press statements will be issued." The AMPTP then submitted a new proposal to the WGA on November 29, 2007, reportedly worth an additional $130 million in compensation. The WGA responded that it did not understand how the $130 million figure had been calculated, but was pleased the AMPTP was proposing figures in that range. Both sides agreed to a four-day recess at the WGA's request. Talks were resumed on December 4.

Following a renewed push on jurisdiction in reality programming by the WGA, including a rally outside North American headquarters of non-signatory reality producer FremantleMedia, talks again broke off on December 7 when the AMPTP walked away from the table, issuing a press release that they would return only upon the WGA dropping several key proposals, among them the reality proposal. This move had been predicted by reporter Nikki Finke and others, many of whom suspected the AMPTP was intentionally delaying negotiations so that it could terminate unwanted production contracts via force majeure. According to Wall Street, the impact of accepting all of WGA's proposals was "largely negligible" and "financially small", suggesting that the studios were afraid that reaching a favorable settlement with the writers might "embolden directors and actors in their coming renegotiations."

In mid-December, the WGA announced plans to try to negotiate with individual production companies to end the impasse. The AMPTP and WGA agreed to resume informal talks in an effort to organize formal negotiations on January 19, 2008. This was accepted and both parties decided to go back to the negotiating table as of that date, however the president of the WGA had ordered a media black-out, with no WGA employees reporting any news to the media. WGA President Patric Verrone did, however, report on January 22 that the animation and reality jurisdiction proposals had been dropped.

On January 25, it was announced that the WGA had made an interim agreement with Lionsgate and Marvel Studios. However, the AMPTP has commented on these types of agreements as "meaningless", although talks between them and WGA continued and many critics believed the strike could be over within two weeks.

On February 2, 2008, despite a media blackout agreed to by both parties during unofficial negotiations, multiple media reports suggested there had been significant progress involving breakthroughs on key issues in the talks. Further reporting suggested that by the end of the business week starting February 4, 2008, a contract proposal might be announced. Pro-WGA blog UnitedHollywood.com confirmed that "creative solutions to the biggest differences between the AMPTP and the WGA have gotten the tentative and cautious approval of both sides", but cautions that the specific legal language has not yet been drafted. The next day, rumors continued to mount; Deadlinehollywooddaily.com reported that Peter Chernin had told fellow Super Bowl XLII attendees that "the strike is over."

This is not over. Nor is it close. Until the moment it is over, it can never be close. Because if we see the finish line we will flag and they are absolutely counting on us to do that. In the room, reason. On the streets, on the net, I say reason is for the 'moderates'. Remember what they've done. Remember what they're trying to take from us. FIGHT. FIGHT. FIGHT.

— Joss Whedon

On February 5, 2008, the WGA leadership scheduled a meeting for active members on Saturday, February 9, 2008, to discuss and gain feedback on a proposed contract. TV executives had described the deadline as February 15 for new material to be produced for the 2007–2008 television season. On February 9, 2008, WGA President Patric Verrone emailed the membership announcing that the WGA leadership and AMPTP had reached a tentative deal. The tentative contract proposals were provided to the membership, and a meeting to discuss them as well as future process was scheduled the same day on both coasts.

According to reports, the first deal discussion meeting for WGAE's members, ended on an optimistic note.

The WGA started a 48-hour vote for guild members on February 10, 2008, regarding a motion on ending the three-month-old strike. Voting ended for WGAE at 7PM EST, on February 12, 2008. The WGAW voted from 2:00 to 6:00 p.m. PST, and at approximately 6:51 PST, WGA president Patric Verone announced that 92.5% of the membership voted to end the strike. On February 26, about 93.6% of WGA members approved a new three-year contract that would be effective until May 1, 2011, with pay hikes ranging from 3 to 3.5%.

At the beginning of April 2008, about one and a half months after the end of the strike, the Writers Guild of America, East filed lawsuit against the ABC television network and Corday Productions over alleged violations of a strike-termination agreement. The legal basis for the suit was that ABC and Corday continued using strike-replacement writers for the soap operas All My Children and Days of Our Lives rather than allowing the original writers to return to work after the end of the strike.

== Strategies and tactics ==
=== AMPTP ===
The WGA organizers are grasping for straws and have never had a coherent strategy for engaging in serious negotiations. The AMPTP may have different companies with different assets in different businesses, but they are all unified in one common goal – to reach an agreement with writers that positions everyone in our industry for success in a rapidly changing marketplace.

— AMPTP spokesman Jesse Hiestand

Foreseeing the possibility of a strike, production companies accelerated production of films and television episodes in an effort to stockpile enough material to continue regular film releases and TV schedules during the strike period. A list of 300 high-priority film projects reportedly circulated around talent agencies in accordance with this effort.

Following the refusal of many showrunners (writer-producers) to cross the picket line in the first week of the strike, production companies sent breach-of-contract letters and suspended many of them without pay.

There was also speculation the companies were seeking out other sources of writing services, including in the UK. The Writers' Guild of Great Britain attempted to thwart this effort, however, by discouraging British union members from participating. Paul Cornell, a writer for several successful television series in the UK, mentioned in a post on his blog on December 14, 2007, that he had declined an approach to cross the WGA picket line and write for an American series.

The AMPTP announced on December 6 that it had hired the public relations services of Chris Lehane and Mark Fabiani, self-dubbed the "Masters of Disaster", who had previously worked for Democratic politicians (including Bill Clinton, Al Gore, John Kerry, and Gray Davis) and who, according to the San Francisco Chronicle, "earn up to $100,000 a month for pulling their clients out of public relations quicksand." The AMPTP also hired former Arnold Schwarzenegger campaign manager Steve Schmidt of Mercury Public Affairs in Sacramento.

Fabiani & Lehane's strategy appeared to be to try to weaken the WGA membership's resolve and foment resentment and doubt regarding WGA leadership within its ranks and in the film industry at large, especially with below-the-line workers, by framing the strike as "havoc... wreaked... by the WGA's actions" (paraphrased) and by blaming the WGA for "start[ing] this strike". They also appeared to be attempting to recast language in terms more favorable to the AMPTP, such as referring to WGA negotiators as "organizers" and branding the AMPTP proposals as a "New Economic Partnership".

In response to their work for the AMPTP, Fabiani & Lehane's union clients SEIU Local 99 and Change To Win terminated their contracts with the consultants.

=== WGA ===
If they gave us everything we had on the table right now, if they gave us everything we wanted—everything—and they then made a deal with the DGA and matched it, which is what they'll do, and then they made a deal with the Screen Actors Guild and tripled it, which is typically what happens...if they did that—if they gave us everything—on a company-by-company basis they would be giving all of us less than each of their CEOs makes in a year. And in some cases, a lot less.

— WGAW president Patric Verrone

It was initially expected that the strike, if it occurred, would be scheduled for the summer of 2008 to coincide with the expiration of the Screen Actors Guild's contracts. Instead, the strike started shortly after the WGA's contracts expired. This was apparently done to give the AMPTP less time to stockpile scripts and otherwise prepare for a strike in 2008.

During the pre-strike negotiations, the WGA created "contract captains" in order to keep the general membership informed on a person-to-person basis of the latest developments. Once the strike started, these members became "strike captains", tasked with communication duties as well as helping to coordinate pickets.

The WGA assigned picketers to location shoots in an attempt to shut down production, and set up picket lines in front of studio gates to encourage Teamsters, particularly truck drivers, not to cross the line.

For its second week of picketing, the WGA reduced their studio strike list from fourteen to ten, shifted picketing hours to earlier in the day, and scheduled a series of daily strike themes ranging from "Bring-A-Star-To-Picket-With-You" (also called "Cast Day") to "Bring-Your-Kids" special events.

The WGA made a direct appeal to the public to explain the issues behind the strike, including use of online videos and blogs. WGA strike captains also encouraged fans to mail pencils to the film and TV moguls en masse. They also considered unorthodox methods, including performing a mock exorcism against Warner Bros. and holding the last rites for the former MBA.

Additionally, the WGA appealed to members of crew and industry craft unions, including the Teamsters, and IATSE, some of whom may not have been aware that their union also received residuals to pay for health and pension programs, and that they were expected to directly benefit from residual gains made by the WGA.

In late December, the WGA announced a new "divide and conquer" strategy designed to break the solidarity of the AMPTP by negotiating strategic interim deals with individual networks, studios, and production companies who were willing to agree to the WGA's proposals. This was intended to put pressure on the other member companies, especially those who were competing with companies that were then able to return to production. The approach resulted in deals with David Letterman's television production company Worldwide Pants, another with feature studio United Artists, and a third one with film studio The Weinstein Company. The new strategy contained some risk for the WGA, however, as there was a risk that some members may resent a few writers working while others were still on strike.

On January 14, 2008, two additional side deals were announced by the WGA – one with Media Rights Capital, a production company working on both features and television, and the other with Spyglass Entertainment. On January 25, 2008, another side deal was reached; the WGA and Marvel Studios signed an interim comprehensive agreement.

On February 3, 2008, the WGA made a deal with four more filmmakers in New York City.

== Effect on television ==
=== Production employees ===
Because production ceased for all scripted television programming, hundreds of thousands of support staff were laid off by the studios. The AMPTP estimated that WGA writers and crewmembers in the IATSE union lost $342.8 million in wages.

Dale Alexander, the key grip for The Office, wrote to the LA Times, expressing thoughts on the strike from the perspective of a production employee.

=== Shows ===
All scripted Hollywood shows except October Road were expected to shut down by the week of December 19, 2007. Hollywood journalist Nikki Finke reported, "CEOs are determined to write off not just the rest of this TV season (including the Back 9 of scripted series), but also pilot season and the 2008/2009 schedule as well. Indeed, network orders for reality TV shows are pouring into the agencies right now."

Within the first week of the strike, AMPTP-member companies fired writers' assistants, production assistants, and other lower-level staffers working on shut-down programs. Writer-producer Seth MacFarlane called this a "desperate, punitive act" and called on "all show-runners whose assistants are terminated, if you have the means, keep paying your assistants because this strike is about the little guys."

Of the "Big Four" networks—CBS, ABC, NBC, and Fox—NBC had the most severe ad shortfall as its prime time ratings declined sharply; none of its new shows achieved breakout success. Moreover, during 2007, NBC saw its prime time 18-to-49-year-old viewership drop by 11%. CBS dropped the same demographic by 10%, and ABC lost 5%. Fox executive Peter Chernin suggested the strike is "probably a positive" for the network, as he expected its non-WGA reality hit American Idol to do especially well given reduced competition.

Although both are WGA members who pledged support for the writers, Jay Leno and Conan O'Brien announced that following the collapse of negotiations, The Tonight Show with Jay Leno and Late Night with Conan O'Brien would return to air on January 2, 2008, without writers, citing their non-writing staff facing layoffs as the main reason.

Unlike Leno and O'Brien, whose talk shows were produced and owned by NBC, David Letterman owned his own independent production company, Worldwide Pants, which on December 28 announced an "interim agreement" with the WGA. This agreement allowed his talk show and The Late Late Show with Craig Ferguson to return to air with writers during the strike under terms contained in the WGA's previously rejected proposals to the AMPTP.

The guild stated it had no plans to target Leno and O'Brien with protests such as were aimed at non-WGA member Carson Daly, who was accused of setting up a joke hotline as a strike-breaking effort when he returned to air. After being back on air, however, Leno was charged by WGA of strike violation after he penned and delivered monologues, but it is unclear as to what action the guild would take. Later, Jon Stewart and Stephen Colbert announced that their respective shows, The Daily Show and The Colbert Report, would also return without writers on January 7, 2008. The WGA accused Comedy Central and NBC of forcing hosts back on air by threatening the jobs of the staff and crew of their shows, and said it would picket them. To show respect to the writers, The Daily Show was renamed, for the duration of the strike, A Daily Show with Jon Stewart. Similarly, The Colbert Report was rebranded as The Colbert Report (with hard T's) for its first new episode since the strike began. In support of the strike, Screen Actors Guild urged its members to appear on programs that had independent agreements with the WGA, such as the Late Show with David Letterman and The Late Late Show with Craig Ferguson. Katrina vanden Heuvel, editor of The Nation rejected an invitation to appear on The Colbert Report, in solidarity with the writers.

After returning to air, The Daily Show and The Colbert Report experienced an increase in ratings. At the end of January 2008, The Daily Show was up 17% for viewers between 18 and 34 from January 2007 and up 9% for 18- to 49-year-olds in the same period. The Colbert Report was up 21% for 18- to 34-year-olds and 15% for 18- to 49-year-olds over the same time period. By contrast, The Tonight Show with Jay Leno, Late Night with Conan O'Brien, Jimmy Kimmel Live! and The Late Late Show with Craig Ferguson experienced a fall in ratings against the previous year, while the Late Show with David Letterman remained level.

Late night ratings averages for the week of January 21–25, 2008
Show	Viewers	18-49
Jay Leno	5.0 M	1.5 M
David Letterman	3.7 M	1.1 M
Nightline	3.0 M	0.9 M
Conan O'Brien	2.0 M	0.8 M
Craig Ferguson	1.7 M	0.6 M
Jimmy Kimmel	1.4 M	0.5 M
Carson Daly	1.1 M	0.4 M

One reason given for the increase in The Daily Show and Colbert Report ratings was the 2008 presidential election, allowing them a large amount of political humor to use. However, one journalist commented that the raise of ratings in these two shows without the writers, "has to be a big PR setback for the WGA."

After the strike began, more unscripted shows were ordered by networks, most coming from the reality genre. One of those shows was the game show Duel, which was ordered by ABC as a result of the strike; the show initially aired as a six-episode long tournament in December 2007 before being renewed for 10 additional episodes as a weekly series.

=== Entertainment award telecasts ===
The writers' strike also created turmoil for various entertainment awards that were broadcast on television. Many awards were severely curtailed or canceled as a result.

As a result of the Screen Actors Guild's solidarity with the WGA, they gave the SAG a waiver on December 11 granting permission for guild writers to create material for the 14th Screen Actors Guild Awards which was shown on TNT and TBS on January 27. The WGA also issued one nine days later allowing writers to write material for Film Independent's Spirit Awards on February 23.

On December 18, the WGA announced it would not issue waivers for the Golden Globe Awards and Academy Awards (Oscars) ceremonies. In an act of solidarity, SAG also decided not to support the Golden Globes as well. Labor experts stated that this move was "an attempt by the guild to bring the Alliance of Motion Picture and Television Producers back to the bargaining table."

The People's Choice Awards, which was also denied a waiver, stated it would have to revamp the format of the ceremony by releasing a taped ceremony for January 8 telecast on CBS, instead of airing it live as usual. As a result of the changes which were made, the telecast was viewed by just 6 million viewers, the lowest ratings ever in the show's history at the time. This was down from 11.3 million viewers the previous year.

The Hollywood Foreign Press Association (HFPA), which hosts the Golden Globes, tried to reach an agreement with the WGA for a waiver, but it fell through. Striking writers then threatened to picket the event, after which almost all of the celebrities due to attend announced they would skip the ceremony rather than cross the picket lines. Facing the prospect of being left without presenters or accepters, HFPA and NBC were forced to adopt another approach for the broadcast. After NBC canceled its exclusive newscast of HFPA announcing the winners, HFPA took complete control of the awards announcement and opened its press conference to all media. WGA assured HFPA that it would not picket the event, citing HFPA's honesty and its honorable and respectful treatment of the guild as reasons. The NBC telecast plummeted in the ratings from 16.0 for the full ceremony in 2007 to 4.7 for the press conference in 2008, fourth (and last) among major networks that night.

The WGA issued two more waivers for awards telecast. One was issued towards the NAACP on January 15 for the NAACP Image Awards a month later, and one on January 29 to the NARAS for the 50th Grammy Awards held on February 10.

The strike ended twelve days before the Academy Awards were held on February 24. Many blamed the strike for the show's low television ratings, since the writers had less time to prepare. The strike also hindered promotion at ABC, the broadcaster in the United States.

=== Television viewership ===
A white paper released by Nielsen Media Research on April 2, 2008, showed that most television viewers spent more time around alternative forms of entertainment outside of broadcast television, including cable television and online video sites, during the course of the strike. Compared with the same time period from 2006 to 2007, during the months of the strike (November 2007 through February 2008) the average primetime ratings for that time period declined by 6.8%.

== Response ==
=== Actors ===
They claim there's no money in the Internet. That's a shell game.

— Actor Robin Williams

The Screen Actors Guild and American Federation of Television and Radio Artists (AFTRA) contracts with the AMPTP both contain a "no strike" clause, meaning that working members of the acting unions are not supposed to walk off their set in support of another union's strike. However, many actors, backed by their unions, expressed their support and solidarity with the writers' strike, with some marching with writers and even refusing to cross the WGA's picket line. Many actors participated in a series of short PSAs as part of the Speechless Without Writers campaign presented by United Hollywood, which was founded by a group of WGA members.

==== List of actors picketing ====
- Alan Tudyk
- Albert Brooks
- Alex Kapp Horner
- Ali Larter
- Alyson Hannigan
- Amy Acker
- Amy Brenneman
- Amy Poehler
- Angela Kinsey
- Anna Paquin
- Anthony Edwards
- April Matson
- Archie Kao
- Ashley Scott
- BD Wong
- B. J. Novak
- Beau Bridges
- Ben Stiller
- Benjamin McKenzie
- Bianca Kajlich
- Bill Paxton
- Bob Stephenson
- Brad Garrett
- Brenda Song
- Brenda Strong
- Brian McNamara
- Brigid Brannagh
- Bruce Thomas
- C. S. Lee
- Camden Toy
- Camryn Manheim
- Clark Gregg
- Colin Ferguson
- Constance Marie
- Creed Bratton
- Currie Graham
- Dana Delany
- Dana Gould
- Danny Glover
- Danny Pino
- David Berman
- David Boreanaz
- David Duchovny
- David Hyde Pierce
- Debrah Farentino
- Diane Farr
- Donal Logue
- Doug Savant
- Drew Fuller
- Dylan Bruno
- Ed Helms
- Edie Falco
- Edie McClurg
- Eliza Dushku
- Ellen Pompeo
- Enrique Murciano
- Ethan Embry
- Eva Longoria
- Felicia Day
- Fionnula Flanagan
- Frances Fisher
- Garry Marshall
- George Lopez
- Gilbert Gottfried
- Greg Grunberg
- Hamish Linklater
- Harry Groener
- Holly Hunter
- Hugh Laurie
- Ian Hart
- Isaiah Washington
- J. August Richards
- Jack Black
- Jack Coleman
- Jack McBrayer
- Jaimie Alexander
- James Belushi
- James Denton
- James Remar
- Jamie Kaler
- January Jones
- Jason Alexander
- Jeanne Tripplehorn
- Jeremy Ratchford
- Jessica Biel
- Jim Parsons
- John Finn
- John Glover
- John Leguizamo
- John Oliver
- John Stamos
- Jon Cryer
- Jon Wellner
- Jordan Hinson
- Josh Stewart
- Joshua Jackson
- Julia Louis-Dreyfus
- Julianna Margulies
- Julianne Moore
- Juliet Landau
- Justin Chambers
- KaDee Strickland
- Kaley Cuoco
- Kat Foster
- Kate Walsh
- Katherine Heigl
- Kathy Griffin
- Keith Carradine
- Keith Szarabajka
- Ken Jenkins
- Kevin Chapman
- Kim Delaney
- Kristen Bell
- Kristin Davis
- Kunal Nayyar
- Laura Harris
- Lena Headey
- Linda Cardellini
- Lisa Arch
- Lisa Edelstein
- Lisa Kudrow
- Liz Vassey
- Lori Loughlin
- Madison Pettis
- Maiara Walsh
- Marc Vann
- Marcia Cross
- Marg Helgenberger
- Masi Oka
- Matthew Modine
- Matthew Perry
- Maura Tierney
- Megyn Price
- Mekhi Phifer
- Michael Emerson
- Michael Fairman
- Mindy Kaling
- Minnie Driver
- Nancy Lee Grahn
- Nathan Fillion
- Neil Patrick Harris
- Nia Vardalos
- Nicholas Brendon
- Nicollette Sheridan
- Oliver Hudson
- Olivia Wilde
- Oscar Nunez
- Parminder Nagra
- Patricia Heaton
- Patrick Dempsey
- Patrick Warburton
- Patton Oswalt
- Paul Lieberstein
- Paula Newsome
- Pooch Hall
- Poppy Montgomery
- Rachel Dratch
- Rainn Wilson
- Rashida Jones
- Ray Romano
- Rex Lee
- Rich Sommer
- Richard Belzer
- Rob Morrow
- Robin Williams
- Ron Glass
- Ron Howard
- Ron Rifkin
- Rondell Sheridan
- Roseanne Barr
- Sally Field
- Sally Pressman
- Sam Harris
- Sam Trammell
- Sam Waterston
- Sandra Oh
- Sara Ramirez
- Sarah Chalke
- Sarah Silverman
- Scott Grimes
- Sendhil Ramamurthy
- Seth Meyers
- Simon Helberg
- Sterling K. Brown
- Summer Glau
- Susan Savage
- T. R. Knight
- Teri Hatcher
- Thom Barry
- Thomas Dekker
- Tia Mowry
- Tim Robbins
- Tina Fey
- Tom Arnold
- Tom Lenk
- Tracie Thoms
- Tricia O'Kelley
- Tuc Watkins
- Valente Rodriguez
- Valerie Harper
- Vanessa Marcil
- Vincent Kartheiser
- Wallace Langham
- Wanda Sykes
- Wendy Davis
- William Petersen
- Zach Braff
- Zachary Levi

==== List of celebrities expressing support for picketers ====
- Alec Baldwin
- Alicia Keys
- Andreas Stenschke
- Angelina Jolie
- Artie Lange
- Ben Affleck
- Conan O'Brien
- David Letterman
- Eva Longoria
- Glenn Close
- Howard Stern
- Jay Leno
- Jenna Fischer
- Joaquin Phoenix
- Jon Stewart
- Justine Bateman
- Kristen Bell
- Ray Bradbury
- Reese Witherspoon
- Robert Redford
- Stephen Colbert
- Steve Carell
- Tom Hanks
- Tom Morello
- Viggo Mortensen
- Vincent Martella
- William Shatner
- Zack de la Rocha

=== Talk show hosts ===
Ray Bradbury appeared at a WGAW rally at Fox Studios in Century City, Jan. 7, 2008 (writers Diane Doniol-Valcroze (l), Arthur K. Flam (r)).

Ellen DeGeneres stated she supports the strike, but crossed the picket line, though she decided not to do a monologue on her show during the strike, explaining that she did not wish to lay off the 135 employees from her staff. The WGAE issued a statement condemning DeGeneres, stating she was "not welcome in NY." DeGeneres' representatives asserted that she did not violate the WGA's agreement, arguing that she is competing with other first-run syndicated shows like Dr. Phil and Regis and Kelly during the competitive November sweeps period, and that DeGeneres must fulfill her duties as host and producers, lest her show lose its time slot or be held in breach of contract. In addition, a statement defending DeGeneres was subsequently issued by American Federation of Television and Radio Artists (AFTRA), pointing out that DeGeneres also works under the AFTRA TV Code, which bars her from striking. The WGAE then issued a response pointing out that DeGeneres is also a Writers Guild member, and that any writing work she does on her show during the strike constitutes struck work.

Early in the strike, it was rumored that Jon Stewart was continuing to pay his Daily Show writers out of his own pocket, but a spokesman later denied the rumor was true. However, The Daily Show temporarily changed its name to A Daily Show to show its support of the strike. Nikki Finke announced that David Letterman would pay his entire staff's salary out of his own pocket through the end of the year. She later announced that following NBC's firing of eighty staffers on The Tonight Show, Jay Leno would continue paying them out of his own pocket as well. Conan O'Brien also promised to pay the salaries of his non-striking staff through the end of the year.

Some comedy shows have performed live shows in order to provide money for the striking workers in a series of ON STRIKE! performances at the Upright Citizens Brigade Theater. The first two shows to perform were Saturday Night Live on November 17, and 30 Rock on November 19. On December 3, The Colbert Report held a similar performance.

Host Bill Maher vocally criticized the movement as the wrong time to carry out such a strike.

=== Writer-producers ===
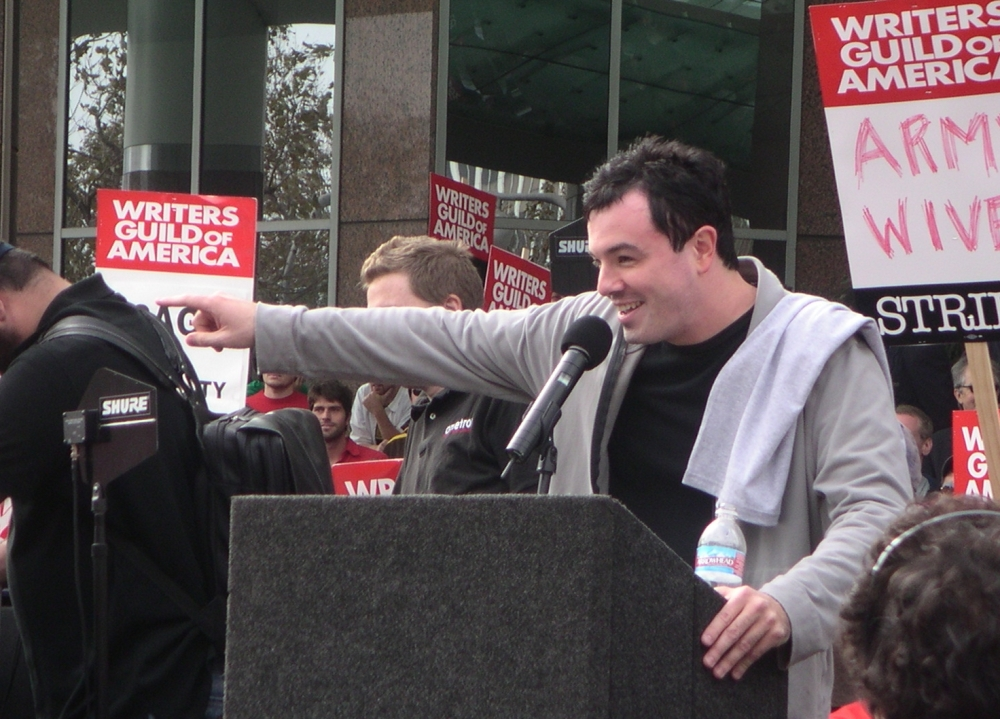
Family Guy and American Dad! creator and actor Seth MacFarlane speaks at a WGAW rally in Los Angeles on November 9, 2007.

Many television writer-producers, also known as "hyphenates" (or "show-runners", if they are in charge of the day-to-day production of a television show) who are WGA members found themselves contractually obligated to continue their production duties while simultaneously barred from performing writing duties during the strike. In a show of solidarity with the writers, approximately 120 show-runners marched in Burbank on November 7, 2007, and many decided to honor the picket lines entirely, refusing to perform even their production duties during the strike.

=== Agents ===
Literary agents stand to lose business when the writers they represent are not working. Some agencies reportedly eliminated assistant positions and others asked their agents to take pay cuts during the strike. A few of the larger and more prominent agencies, including William Morris, CAA, and ICM provided coffee, bagels, and churros for picketing writers. Agents had also reportedly been involved in back-channel efforts to get the two parties to return to the negotiating table before talks resumed November 26.

=== Media executives ===
Two prominent executives, both of whom headed major studios in the 1980s and moved on to Internet-related ventures, voiced their disagreement with the tactics of the WGA.

For a writer to give up today's money for a nonexistent piece of the future — they should do it in three years, shouldn't be doing it now — they are misguided; they should not have gone on the strike.

— Michael Eisner, new-media executive

Former Disney CEO Michael Eisner characterized the writers' strike as "insanity". He addressed a business conference, saying, "I've seen stupid strikes, I've seen less stupid strikes, and this strike is just a stupid strike."

Former Paramount and Fox CEO Barry Diller also stated the strike is "stupid". In comments to Fox Business Channel, he said, "There are no profits for the work that writers do that is then digitized and distributed through the Internet." Diller is currently the CEO of the Internet conglomerate IAC/InterActiveCorp.

Diller also suggested that the Writers Guild should have waited five years to see where the revenues from new-media ventures were coming from. "We want to freeze this area until we can understand the revenues, which aren't going to develop for another few years."

Neither executive, however, expressed support for the AMPTP.

=== Politicians ===
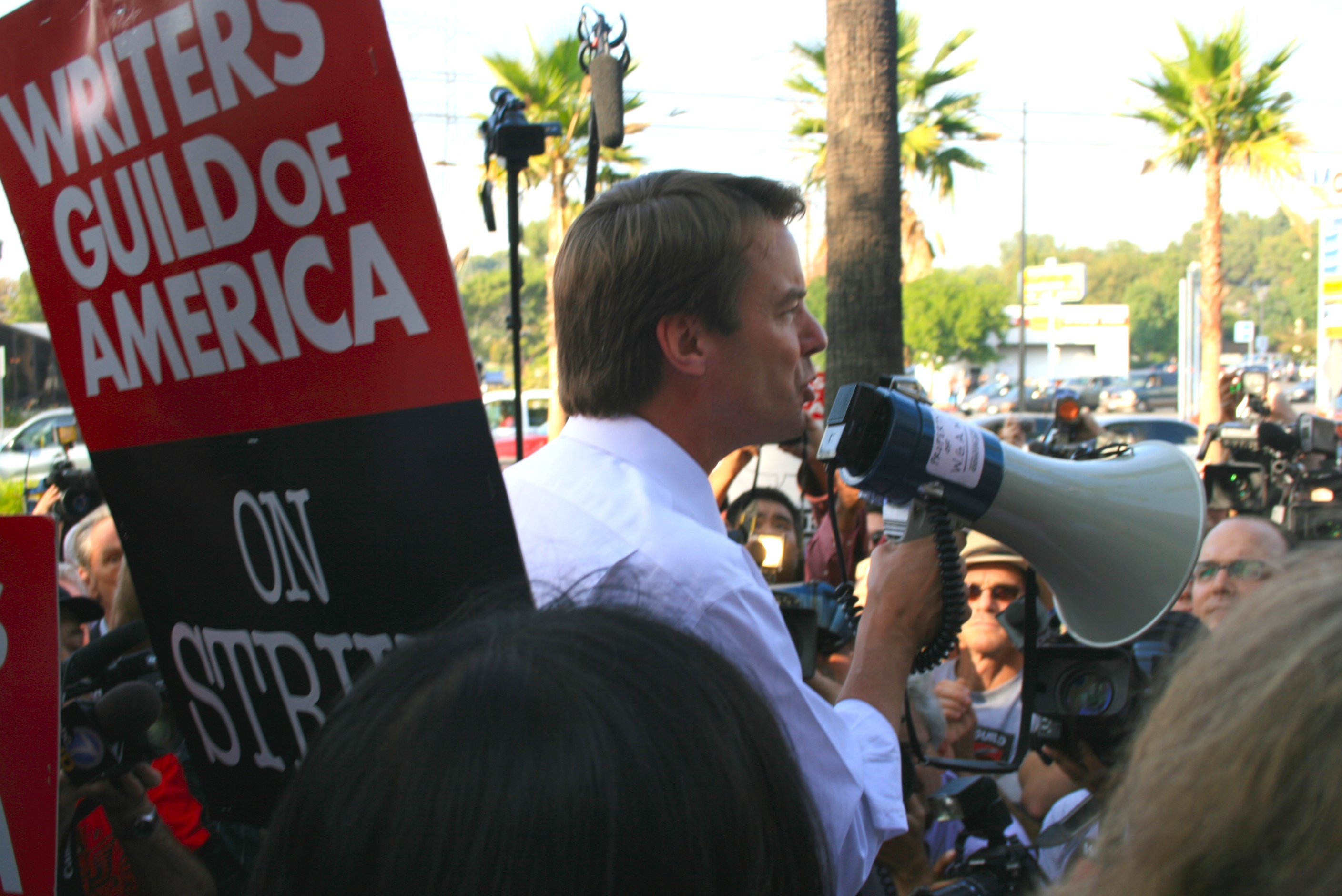
Then presidential candidate John Edwards attends November 16, 2007, rally for striking writers at a WGAW protest at NBC in Burbank.

The California governor at the time, Arnold Schwarzenegger, negotiated with both sides of the dispute "because it has a tremendous economic impact on our state." The 2008 Democratic presidential candidates, Senator and eventual President Barack Obama, Sen. Hillary Clinton, Sen. John Edwards, and Gov. Bill Richardson, each issued statements of support for the WGA. Although 2008 Republican presidential candidate Rudy Giuliani stated that "a candidate for office really shouldn't get involved," he did offer to serve as a mediator between the parties, citing his experience "settl[ing] several difficult labor disputes" as Mayor of New York City. Civil rights leader and former presidential candidate Jesse Jackson marched with the writers and spoke at a WGA rally on November 9, 2007. On November 13, 2007, the Los Angeles County Democratic Party adopted a resolution in support of the WGA. WGAW president Patric Verrone and Screen Actors Guild president Alan Rosenberg traveled to Washington, D.C., on November 14 to meet with legislators and regulators about the unions' position on new media. On November 16, John Edwards appeared in person to picket and speak with the writers outside NBC studios in Burbank, CA. The December 10, 2007, Democratic presidential debate that was to be held in Los Angeles, California, was cancelled on November 28, 2007, due to candidate boycott.

On December 19, 2007, Los Angeles City Council's Housing, Community, and Economic Development Committee held a hearing on the economic impact of the strike on the local and regional economy, allowing the WGA and AMPTP to testify. However, the AMPTP declined to attend, but sent in Motion Picture Association of America to issue a statement to the committee on its behalf. The Los Angeles City Council approved a resolution which urged the two sides to return to the bargaining table. Jerry Nickelsburg, an economics professor at UCLA Anderson School of Management, presented UCLA Anderson Forecast's economic report. He stated that so far, the strike has not affected the economy deeply, citing the network's inventory stockpiling in preparation of the strike and the increase in usage of reality shows. Ultimately, the Forecast predicted an economic impact of $380 million if the strike were to last 22 weeks, which was how long the 1988 strike had lasted. Jack Kyser, an economist of Los Angeles County Economic Development Corporation, predicted that the total amount of the direct loss and indirect loss so far was estimated at $220 million, and revenues generated for the county from the annual Academy Awards would dip if the strike were to continue and actors honored the picket lines. The strike ended twelve days before the awards show.

On January 3, 2008, Republican presidential candidate Mike Huckabee appeared on The Tonight Show. "I support the writers, by the way. Unequivocally, absolutely. They're dead right on this one... I don't think anybody supports the producers on this one. Maybe the producers support the producers, but I think everybody in the business and even the general public supports the writers."

=== Other unions and associations ===
The WGA acknowledged support from several unions, including the Screen Actors Guild, the Teamsters, the Service Employees International Union, the International Longshore and Warehouse Union, the National Writers Union, as well as writers guilds in Canada, Australia, Great Britain, Germany, New Zealand, France, Netherlands, Greece, Ireland, Switzerland, and Belgium. Many of the various genre writers associations also came out in support of the WGA's strike, including the Horror Writers Association, the Mystery Writers of America, and the Science Fiction and Fantasy Writers of America.

The numbers speak for themselves and show that the WGA leadership is totally out of touch with the impact of their foolhardy tactics. Figures don't lie, liars figure.

— IATSE president Tom Short

The International Alliance of Theatrical Stage Employees, which represents most of the below-the-line motion picture employees (over 50,000 members) and has jurisdictional disputes with WGAW in animation, did not join the strike, citing a "no strike" provision in their contracts. IATSE president Tom Short has publicly criticized the tactics of the WGA, arguing that the Writers Guild intended to strike almost a year in advance of the expiration of the writers' contract. In a letter to Verrone made publicly available, Short wrote, "When I phoned you on Nov. 28, 2006, to ask you to reconsider the timing of negotiations, you refused. It now seems that you were intending that there be a strike no matter what you were offered, or what conditions the industry faced when your contract expired at the end of October."

=== General public ===
Several opinion polls gauged the public's response to the strike. One national survey conducted by Pepperdine University from November 7 to November 9 found that 84%, or more than four out of five Americans, were aware the strike was in progress. While 75% of respondents were found to have little to no concern over the strike, nearly two-thirds of the sample sided with the writers, one third was unsure, and only four percent sympathized with the AMPTP (1,000 American adults participated). A second regional poll conducted by SurveyUSA on November 11 among L.A. residents indicated that 8% supported the studios, while 69% supported the writers (550 American adults participated, with 482 identifying as familiar with the strike). According to a USA Today/Gallup Poll conducted six weeks into the strike from December 13 to December 15, 60% of Americans side with the writers, while 14% favor the studios (1,011 American adults participated). Among the viewers, 49% said they were more likely to watch reruns, 40% said they planned to watch reality series and other programming not disrupted by the strike, and 26% were more likely to buy or rent DVDs of television series from past seasons. Viewers of late-night talk shows have already changed their habits: out of 25% of the poll respondents who said they frequently or occasionally watch late-night talk shows, 27% watched another show, 25% went to bed earlier, and 25% read. Only 12% watched reruns, indicated by the shows' decreasing ratings.

Viewers of individual television shows organized to support "their" writers. Fans4Writers, an outgrowth of Joss Whedon's fan base, walked the picket line and provided regular food drops to picketing writers. Additionally, one of the largest fan-based pickets began the morning of January 24, 2008, at NBC Studios in Burbank when fans of the series Xena: Warrior Princess, a popular series which had ceased production in 2001, lined up to march in support of the WGA. Producers and actors from the TV show joined the line, including performers Renee O'Connor, Adrienne Wilkinson, and Timothy Omundson, and producers Robert Tapert, RJ Stewart, Steven L. Sears, Liz Friedman, and others. As with Fans4Writers, Xena fans had been donating food and water to the picket lines for the duration of the strike and an upcoming Xena Convention in Burbank offered the opportunity of a focused show of support from fans worldwide.

The long-term effect on the viewing habits of the general public is difficult to gauge. For reference, estimates suggest that 10% of the overall television-viewing audience was lost as a result of the 1988 writers' strike, a drop-off that has not been reversed.

== Related work stoppages ==
=== Past Hollywood guild walk-outs ===
- 2000 commercial actors strike, almost six months.
- 1988 Writers Guild of America strike, 22 weeks.
- 1987 Director's strike, 3 hours and 5 minutes.
- 1985 Writers strike, two weeks.
- 1981 Writers Guild of America strike, three months.
- 1980 Actors strike, three months.
- 1960 Actors strike, led by SAG President Ronald Reagan, six weeks.
- 1952 Actors strike, two and a half months.
- 1945 Set decorators Hollywood Black Friday strike, six months.
- 1942–44 Musicians' strike, thirteen months plus.
- 1941 Disney animators' strike, five weeks.

=== 2007–2008 CBS News writers strike ===
On November 19, 2007, news writers for CBS News and CBS-owned stations voted to authorize strike action against their employers. Timed closely to the WGA strike, this action has resulted in statements from politicians unwilling to cross picket lines for interview shows and candidate debates. On January 9, the WGAE and CBS News struck a tentative deal. On January 24, 2008, the WGA announced that its members had voted to ratify the contract, which runs to April 1, 2010.

=== Other 2008 industry-wide strike threats ===
Any increase for the benefits of health insurance, pension, or residual gains made by the WGA are also likely to be demanded by other entertainment industry labor unions when their contracts expire. This is a practice known as pattern bargaining — the first union to reach a contract with the AMPTP usually sets the template for the agreement with other unions. The contracts for the Screen Actors Guild (SAG) and Directors Guild of America (DGA) expired on June 30, 2008.

==== Directors Guild of America ====
The Directors Guild of America (DGA), whose members are directors as well as below-the-line workers (1st and 2nd assistant directors), was less focused on the WGA's most contentious issue, new media residuals. The DGA's negotiations with the AMPTP started on January 12, 2008, and on January 17, the DGA announced they had reached a tentative agreement.

Following the DGA announcement, ER executive producer and former WGA president John Wells stated he believes that using the DGA agreement as a template, the strike could be easily resolved within two weeks. Other writers disagreed with Wells' positive assessment.

==== Screen Actors Guild ====
Like the WGA, the Screen Actors Guild (SAG) is very concerned with residuals in new media and were especially supportive of the WGA's strike effort. SAG president Alan Rosenberg suggested that SAG could choose to ignore the tradition of pattern bargaining if terms of the DGA's deal were deemed insufficient to the actors. Thus, if the new media issue was not resolved to their satisfaction by the DGA or WGA by July 2008, SAG was likely to strike when their contract expired, a move which could potentially bring the Hollywood film industry to a near-complete standstill. The previous deal between the SAG and AMPTP expired on June 30, 2008; however, on May 6 both organizations had ended talks without a deal. The SAG scheduled a rally for the morning of June 9 in Los Angeles; the WGA subsequently encouraged its members to support SAG members in that rally.

== Outcomes ==
On November 19, 2008, the Writers Guild of America announced they were filing arbitration against the Alliance of Motion Picture & Television Producers for not honoring the agreement that ended the strike. The matter was resolved with WGA and AMPTP, and a new agreement took effect on May 2, 2011.

== See also ==
- List of Hollywood strikes
  - 1960 Writers Guild of America strike
  - 1981 Writers Guild of America strike
  - 2023 Writers Guild of America strike
- Effect of the 2007–08 Writers Guild of America strike on television
- Financial core – regarding National Labor Board v. General Motors, a 1963 U.S. Supreme Court case
- ABS-CBN franchise renewal controversy
- Impact of the COVID-19 pandemic on television in the United States
- Who Made Huckabee?

Related groups

- AMPTP
- WGAE
- WGAW
