= Emmanuel Schwartz =

Canadian actor and playwright

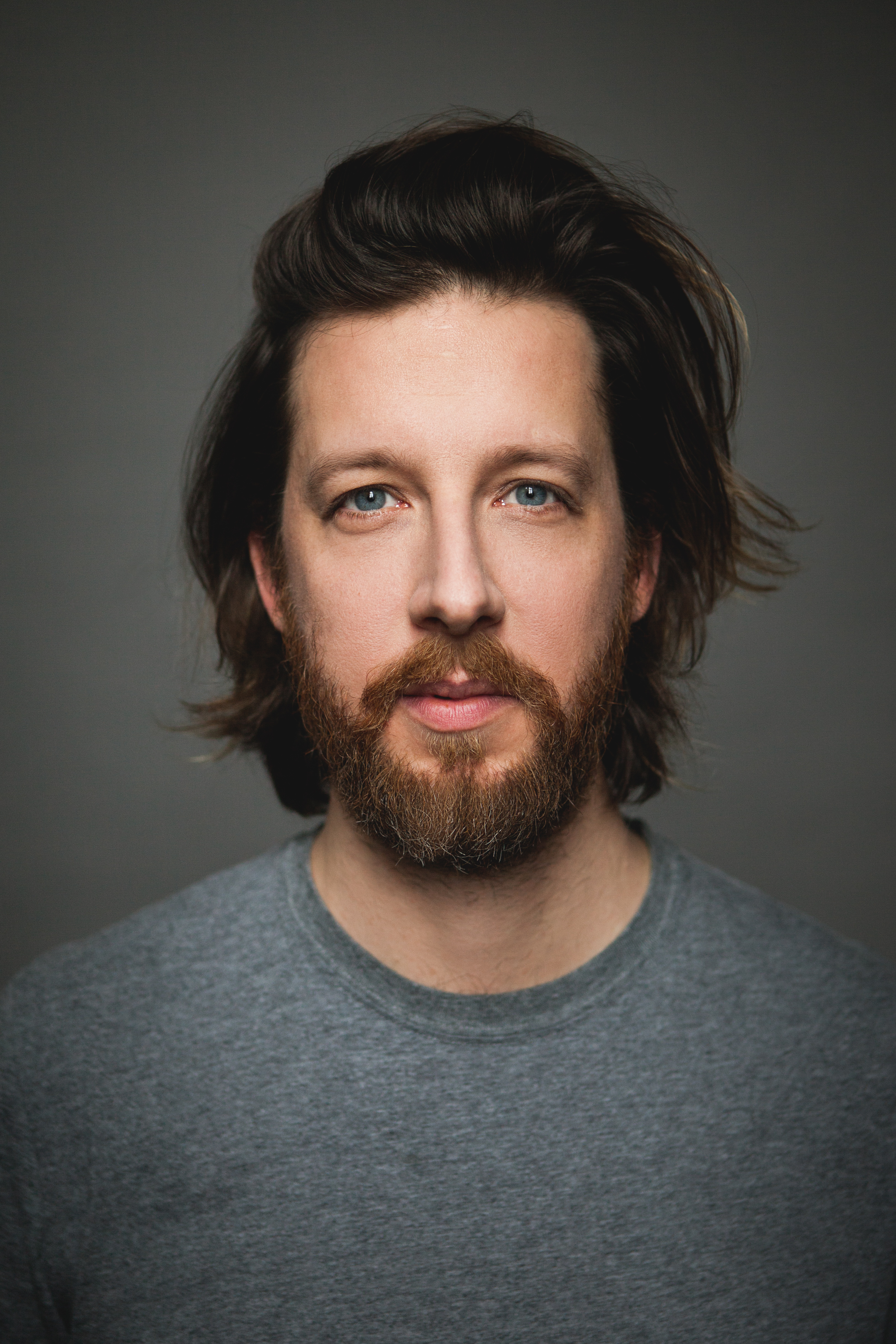
- Occupations: actor, writer
- Years active: 2000s-present
- Notable work: Hochelaga, Land of Souls, La Contemplation du mystère

Emmanuel Schwartz is a Canadian actor and playwright from Montreal, Quebec. He is most noted for his performance as Étienne Maltais in the film Hochelaga, Land of Souls (Hochelaga, terre des âmes), for which he won the Prix Iris for Best Supporting Actor at the 20th Quebec Cinema Awards in 2018.

== Early life and career ==
The fluently bilingual son of a Jewish father and a Québécois mother, he performs in both English and French roles. He has appeared in the films Without Her (Sans elle), Laurence Anyways, Laurentia (Laurentie), L'Affaire Dumont, Nelly, Sashinka, We Are Gold (Nous sommes Gold), The Twentieth Century, Goddess of the Fireflies (La déesse des mouches à feu), La Contemplation du mystère and The Dishwasher (Le Plongeur), and the television series Kif-Kif, Blue Moon, Sylvain le magnifique, L'Écrivain public and Lâcher prise.

In 2014, he was cowriter with Alexia Bürger of the theatrical play Alfred. In 2017, his theatrical piece Exhibition/L’Exhibition, co-created with Benoît Gob and Francis La Haye, premiered at Montreal's Festival TransAmériques. In 2020, he performed the role of the Librarian in a dual stage production of Glen Berger's play Underneath the Lintel, both in English for the Segal Centre for Performing Arts and in a French translation by Serge Lamothe for the Théâtre du Nouveau Monde.

In 2022 he released Projet Pigeons, his debut film as a director. The film was a docufiction created with students in the theatre program at Collège Lionel-Groulx.

He followed up with Le Partage, a filmed version of his own one-man stage show, in 2024, and The Future (L'Avenir), a film again created with students from Collège Lionel-Groulx, in 2025.
