= Underneath the Lintel =

Play written by Glen Berger

- Promotional poster of US actor Richard Schiff in the 2007 West End production
- Original language: English
- Written by: Glen Berger
- Characters: The Librarian
- Genre: Monodrama

Premiere
- Date: 2001
- Place: The Actors' Gang, Los Angeles; Soho Playhouse, New York; Duchess Theatre, London

Underneath the Lintel is a play by Glen Berger. Originally premiering at The Actors' Gang in Los Angeles, CA in May 2001. Directed by Brent Hinkley and starring Brian T. Finney, the production won the Ovation Award for Best Play. The production later transferred Off-Broadway at the Soho Playhouse in October 2001.

Underneath the Lintel was later produced at the George Street Playhouse in New Brunswick, NJ in January 2006. Directed by Maria Mileaf and starring Richard Schiff, this production later transferred to London's West End for a 10-week engagement at the Duchess Theatre. The production was nominated for a WhatsOnStage Award and was subsequently broadcast on BBC Four.

Throughout the play, the sole character—the Librarian—embarks on a quest to find out who anonymously returned a library book that is 113 years overdue. A clue scribbled in the margin of the book and an unclaimed dry-cleaning ticket then take him on a mysterious adventure that spans the globe and the ages.

== Plot synopsis ==
The play begins with the Librarian appearing on stage, which is sparsely furnished with a whiteboard and marker pens, a magnetic bulletin board, and a table. The Librarian carries with him a battered suitcase. He informs the audience that he is giving a lecture for only one day about a discovery he has made.

The Librarian then opens his suitcase and begins to show the audience what he calls his "scraps": pieces of evidence each marked with numbered tags that provide evidence of a person whose identity is gradually revealed over the course of the play.

He starts with a copy of a Baedeker travel guide that was anonymously returned 113 years overdue to the library in the small Dutch town where he used to work. Tracking down the loan records of the book, he finds that the book was borrowed by one "A." who provided a post office box as his address. Inside the book, he finds a 73-year-old dry-cleaning ticket for an unclaimed piece of clothing in a London laundry shop. Intrigued, he takes leave from work to visit London. He finds that the laundry shop is still in business and, using the ticket, redeems a pair of trousers that has not been cleaned because of its poor condition.

Eventually, the audience learns that the person to whom all of the Librarian's items relate may be Ahasuerus the Wandering Jew, a mythical figure from medieval Christian folklore.

== Production history ==
Underneath the Lintel was first produced in 2001 in Los Angeles by The Actors' Gang theatre company. Brent Hinkley directed and Brian T. Finney played the Librarian. It was produced later that same year in New York at the Soho Playhouse with T. Ryder Smith as the librarian. Scott Morfee, Tom Wirtshafter and Dana Matthow were the producers, with Randy White directing. Sets were by Lauren Halpern, lighting by Tyler Micoleau, sound by Paul Adams, costumes by Miranda Hoffman and projections by Elaine J. McCarthy. The play ran for 450 performances, and was voted among the Top Ten Plays of the Year by Time Out NY magazine. T. Ryder Smith played the Librarian, and received a Drama Desk Award nomination that year as Outstanding Solo Performer.

The Canadian premiere was produced in Edmonton by Shadow Theatre in 2002. The play received an Elizabeth Sterling Haynes Award as the outstanding production of the year, as well as awards for actor Andy Curtis and director James DeFelice.

The Seattle premiere was at the Empty Space Theatre in March 2003 starring Todd Jefferson Moore.

The Metropolitan Baltimore-Washington premier was at Round House Theatre in July 2003 directed by Jane Beard starring Jerry Whiddon.

The Lantern Theater Company of Philadelphia presented the play in 2003, with Peter DeLaurier as the Librarian, who won a Barrymore Award as Leading Actor in a Play. He reprised the role at the same venue in 2015.

The Houston premiere of the play was in February 2004 at Main Street Theater, produced by Hero Productions, with Jim Bernhard as the Librarian, directed by Roy Hamlin. The play was subsequently produced in Houston in March 2008 by the Alley Theatre with John Tyson as the Librarian, directed by Alex Harvey.

Orlando Theatre Project presented the US southeastern premiere of this play in May 2004, featuring Kristian Truelsen as the Librarian and directed by Doug Truelsen.

Cesear's Forum, Cleveland's small minimalist theatre at Kennedy's Down Under, Playhouse Square, OH, presented the play in an April/May 2004 production.

The play received a 2005 production at the George Street Playhouse in New Brunswick, New Jersey, with US actor Richard Schiff as the Librarian. It was then staged again at Indiana Repertory Theatre in Indianapolis, Indiana, between 21 March and 6 May 2006. Robert K Johansen played the Librarian, directed by John Green.

Beowulf Alley Theatre in Tucson, Arizona, produced the play in 2005 with Roberto Guajardo in the lead role.

First Presbyterian Theater of Fort Wayne, Indiana produced Lintel at the end of its 2005–2006 season in July 2006 with Joel D. Scribner as the Librarian, directed by Thom Hofrichter.

The Irish premiere was produced by Landmark Productions in September 2006 as part of the Dublin Fringe Festival, directed by Joshua Edelman and starring Philip O'Sullivan, receiving nominations for Best Production and Best Male Performer in the festival. The production subsequently played at the Assembly Rooms as part of the 2010 Edinburgh Festival Fringe.

Schiff reprised the role at the Duchess Theatre in London's West End from 7 February to 31 March 2007. This production was directed by Maria Mileaf. A radio version of the play, performed by Richard Schiff, was broadcast by BBC Radio 4 on 5 January 2008.

The eastern Canadian premiere of the play opened at the 2007 Fringe Festival of Toronto at the Factory Theatre in July 2007. The performance was produced by the Book Productions and Celeste Sansregret and starred Canadian actor John D. Huston as the Librarian.

In the winter of 2013, Kingbaby Productions mounted the play on Bowen Island, British Columbia starring David Cameron as the Librarian.

Original off-Broadway director Randy White directed a new production of the play in Bloomington, Indiana in May 2013 for his company, Cardinal Stage Company, starring Mike Price as the Librarian.

In May 2013, Duncan Henderson played the role of the Librarian in a production directed by D. James Newton in Brighton, UK.

In 2013, Mick Mize played the role of the librarian in a production performed at the Live Oak Theater in Berkeley, CA.

In 2013, the American Conservatory Theater in San Francisco presented David Strathairn as the Librarian.

In 2014, the local theater Vendsyssel Teater in Hjørring, Denmark presented the play under the name of Rejsen ("The travel"). The Librarian was played by local actor Asger Reher, and the show was directed by Peter Schrøder. The play premiered on September 4, 2014.

In 2014, the Triad Stage in North Carolina, presented the play. The Librarian was played by New York-based actor Kate Goehring, and the show was directed by Triad Artistic Director Preston Lane. The play premiered on September 20, 2014.

In 2017, the Godot Cafe Theatre from Bucharest (Romania) presented the play. The Librarian is played by Razvan Vasilescu.

In 2017, Chicago theatre ensemble Theatre Y presented the play 26 times over a 38-day period along the Camino de Santiago. The Librarian was played by Darren Hill.

In 2019 it was presented at the Winnipeg Fringe Festival in July.

In 2020, it was presented at Playmakers Community Theatre in Grove, Oklahoma. The Librarian was played by Jonathan Elmore from January 31 through February 16.

A dual production in Montreal, Quebec was jointly staged in 2020 by both the Segal Centre for Performing Arts in its original English form and the Théâtre du Nouveau Monde as Zébrina, a French translation by Serge Lamothe. Actor Emmanuel Schwartz performed the role of the Librarian in both versions.

In 2021, Milwaukee Chamber Theatre produced it, directed by Brent Hazelton with Elyse Edelman as the librarian. It ran from April 9, 2021, to May 2, 2021.

The Criterion Theatre in Coventry, UK, gave 7 performances in 2021, from 28 August to 4 September. This production was directed by Richard Warren, with Jon Elves as The Librarian.

== Publication ==
Underneath the Lintel is published by Broadway Play Publishing Inc in both the original version and one in which the Librarian is female.
