= Alex Harvey =

Alex Harvey may refer to:

- Alex Harvey (actor), American actor
- Alex Harvey (musician) (1935–1982), Scottish musician
- Alex Harvey (country musician) (1947–2020), American songwriter from Tennessee
- Alex Harvey (curler), Scottish wheelchair curler
- Alex Harvey (skier) (born 1988), Canadian cross-country skier

== See also ==
- Alexander Harvey (disambiguation)
