= Chris Lehane =

American political consultant (born 1967)

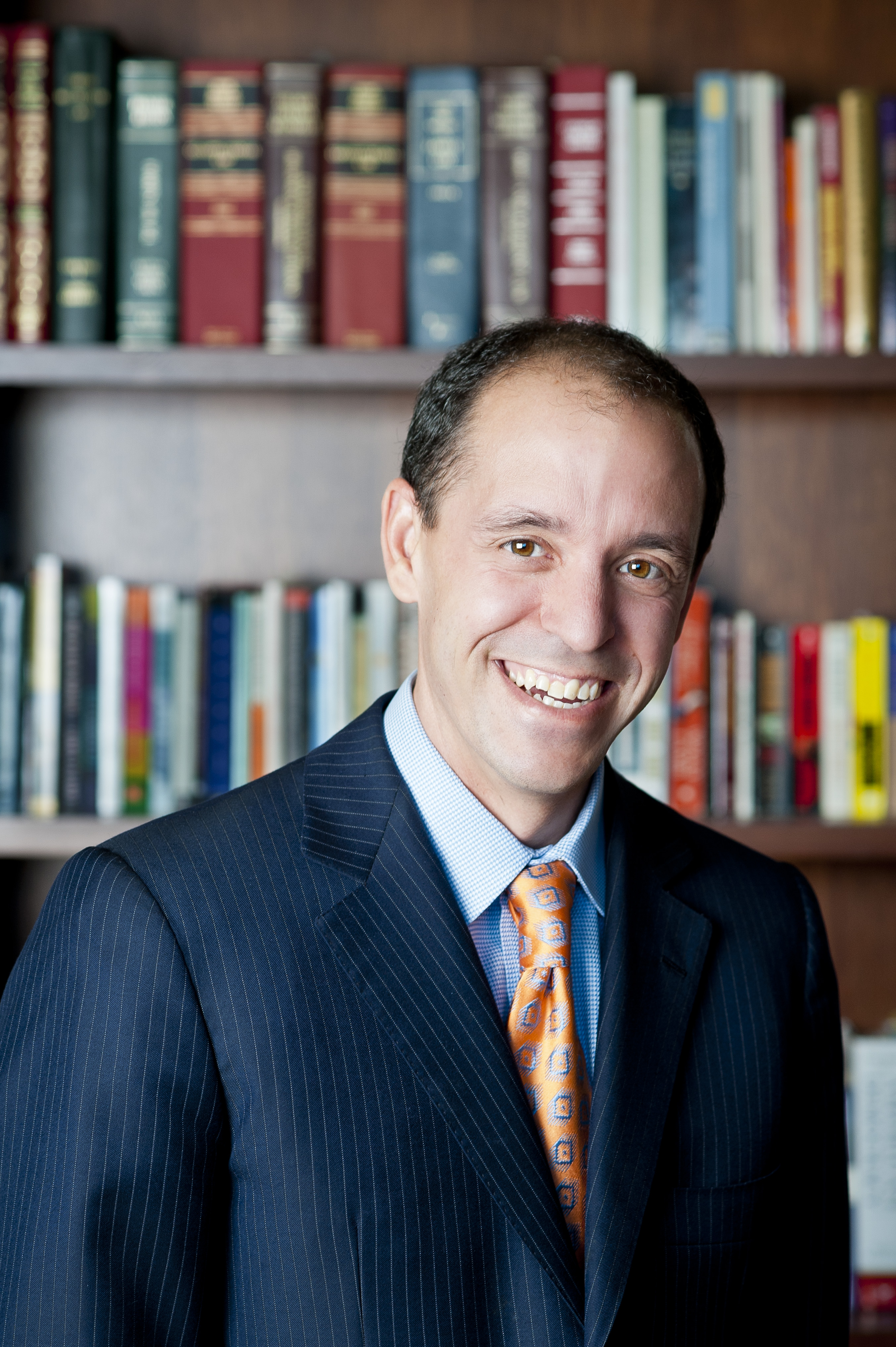
- Born: Christopher Stephen Lehane; June 2, 1967 (age 59)
- Education: Amherst College (BA); Harvard University (JD)
- Employer: OpenAI
- Title: Chief Global Affairs Officer
- Political party: Democratic

Christopher Stephen Lehane (born June 2, 1967) is an American political consultant and cryptocurrency and AI executive who has served as a lawyer, spokesperson, and expert in opposition research for the Bill Clinton administration, Democratic Party candidates for public office, and various business, labor, entertainment, and professional sports organizations.

A graduate of Amherst College and Harvard Law School, Lehane was a lawyer and spokesperson in the Clinton White House where he and his current business partner Mark Fabiani were called the "Masters of Disaster" by Newsweek for their part in a "rapid-response" team employed to respond to the increasing number of investigations of the Clinton administration. In 2012, Lehane co-authored Masters of Disaster, a nonfiction book about damage control with Fabiani and Bill Guttentag. He also co-wrote and produced Guttentag's 2013 political satire film Knife Fight.

From 2015 until 2022, Lehane served as the head of global policy and public affairs for Airbnb. He joined Haun Ventures, a crypto investment firm, in 2022, and is known for his strong support of blockchain technology, and his proposal for a new deal for Web3. In 2024, Lehane was appointed as vice president of global policy at OpenAI, the artificial intelligence company known for developing ChatGPT.

== Political work ==
In 1992, Lehane was the political director of the Clinton-Gore presidential campaign in Maine, and was later brought into the White House where he served as a lawyer in the White House Counsel's Office who worked as part of a small unit responsible for helping the White House manage various scandals throughout the 1990s such as Whitewater and the Monica Lewinsky affair. In 1995, Lehane authored a 332-page memo on a media "conspiracy" against the Clintons, of which only 2 and a half pages are written text; the remainder being newspaper and internet clippings. This report, named "The communication stream of conspiracy commerce", was the origin of the phrase "vast right-wing conspiracy" that is often attributed to Hillary Clinton.

In the 2000 U.S. presidential election campaign, Lehane served as the Press Secretary for Vice President Al Gore. Lehane was credited with improving Gore's press relations with the press corps, his one liners and for his opposition research work. In his 2010 book, President George W. Bush's top political strategist Karl Rove, call him "one of the Democratic Party's best opposition researchers" credited Lehane's making public Bush's driving while intoxicated history just before the election as the basis for Gore winning the popular vote in the 2000 election. Lehane has done work for other leading political figures in the U.S., including New York Attorney General Andrew Cuomo and former California Governor Gray Davis.

The New York Times labeled Lehane the "Master of the Political Dark Arts" for his opposition research work on behalf of the failed Wesley Clark bid for the 2004 nomination when he mounted considerable efforts to derail the Howard Dean bid, portraying him as hypocritical, dishonest, and inconsistent. In 2007, Lehane helped create the Lincoln Brigade, an organization that defeated a Republican sponsored ballot initiative designed to change how California divides up its Electoral College votes. In April 2009, Lehane and Republican political consultant Steve Schmidt opened a ballot initiative political firm. Lehane has served as a strategist on various statewide ballot campaigns, including running the "no" side to a Republican Party sponsored Electoral College initiative; Labor's Proposition 17; and the effort to pass California Proposition 19, or the Regulate, Control and Tax Cannabis Act of 2010 and other statewide and local initiatives.

In 2010, Lehane helped launch Level The Playing Field, an independent expenditure organization backed by labor unions and designed to target Republican gubernatorial candidate Meg Whitman. Also in 2010, Lehane was a lead strategist on No On 23, a successful effort to beat back the oil industry's effort to overturn California's Global Warming Solutions Act of 2006. He was active in the June 2012 campaign to raise the tobacco tax in California and was the lead strategist for Proposition 39, which closes a loop-hole in the California state tax code that provided more favorable tax treatment for out-of-state companies doing business in California compared to in-state companies. He serves on the board of advisors for various high tech companies and non-profit boards, including as member of the Board of Trustees of Amherst College.

Lehane is often cited in discussions of methodologies employed by political campaign consultants, including feeding information to selected media outlets. Lehane often works as a television commentator and a frequent op-ed contributor. In May 2015, Lehane assessed Republican Marco Rubio as a "Dan Quayle without the experience" in the field of potential opponents to Democratic frontrunner Hillary Clinton.

Lehane participated in setting up the cryptocurrency industry super PAC Fairshake and the pro-AI super PAC Leading the Future.

== Business work ==
In 2001, Lehane and his partner Mark Fabiani began a private political communications consultancy called Fabiani & Lehane. They have represented various corporate, labor, entertainment, and sports organizations. Lehane is often quoted as an expert on crisis management. Lehane's firm has represented Southern California Edison during the 2000/2001 California Energy crisis, Goldman Sachs during the 2008 financial crisis, Cisco Systems during the dot-com bubble burst, Lance Armstrong on various matters, Al Gore's Current TV when it fired Keith Olbermann in 2012; Madonna in relation to the Kabbalah Center and her charity in Africa; Rob Reiner and First Five; Hollywood studios, and Indian tribes, among others.

Lehane does significant sports work having represented the National Hockey League, the City of Sacramento in its effort to build a new sports and entertainment complex, the Big East, Marion Jones and the San Diego Chargers. Lehane was hired by Michael Moore to do PR for his 2004 Fahrenheit 9/11 and later by Harvey Weinstein to do PR for Moore's 2007 documentary Sicko; He helped orchestrate the News Corp.-funded Don't Count Us Out campaign against the Nielsen Media Research relating to concerns that minority viewership was being undercounted. Lehane has worked for consumer groups, trial lawyers, and helped lead organized labor's opposition to Governor Arnold Schwarzenegger's agenda in California.

Lehane was hired by Airbnb in 2015, following which he was involved in frequent aggressive campaigns against government officials. In the run-up to the establishment of short-term rental regulations in Boston, Airbnb went after then-city council member Michelle Wu (who became the Mayor of Boston in 2021). Airbnb e-mailed a broad swath of its Boston customers urging them to e-mail City Hall to oppose what they called "unreasonable restrictions" Wu had proposed on short-term rentals. In July 2024, Lehane joined the board of cryptocurrency exchange Coinbase.

== Book and film ==
Lehane is co-author, along with his business partner Mark Fabiani and Stanford Business School Professor Bill Guttentag, of Masters of Disaster: The Ten Commandments of Damage Control. He is also a writer and producer of Knife Fight, a political satire acquired by IFC that consider whether the ends justify the means and stars Rob Lowe as a political fixer dealing with a series of scandals. The film features an ensemble cast that includes Julie Bowen, Eric McCormack, Richard Schiff, Carrie-Anne Moss, and Jamie Chung. The film premiered at the Tribeca Film Festival where the satire was reviewed as "entertaining", "fun", "at once wise, witty, and extremely funny" and “a nostalgic kick” for political junkies, but has received a 28% on Rotten Tomatoes and grossed less than $5,700 in theaters.
