= Knife Fight (film) =

2012 US political thriller film by Bill Guttentag

- Directed by: Bill Guttentag
- Written by: Bill Guttentag; Chris Lehane
- Produced by: Catherine Davila; Daniel Davila
- Starring: Rob Lowe; Carrie-Anne Moss; Jamie Chung; Richard Schiff; Amanda Crew; Julie Bowen; Ryan Alosio
- Cinematography: Stephen Kazmierski
- Edited by: Robert Dalva
- Production company: Divisadero Pictures
- Distributed by: Myriad Pictures; IFC Films
- Release dates: April 25, 2012 (Tribeca Film Festival); January 25, 2013 (United States)
- Running time: 100 minutes
- Country: United States
- Language: English
- Box office: $5,661

Knife Fight is a 2012 American political thriller film starring Rob Lowe, Carrie-Anne Moss, Jamie Chung, Richard Schiff, Amanda Crew, Julie Bowen, and Ryan Alosio. It is directed by Bill Guttentag and co-written by Guttentag and political consultant Chris Lehane. The film was shot in San Francisco, California, and the production participated in the "Scene in San Francisco Incentive Program" administered by the San Francisco Film Commission. The film premiered at the 2012 Tribeca Film Festival and was released theatrically in the United States on January 25, 2013, and released on demand and digitally on January 28, 2013. Davey Havok of the band AFI makes an appearance.

== Synopsis ==
A political strategist juggles three clients while facing the moral issues of his profession.

== Cast ==
- Rob Lowe as Paul Turner
- Julie Bowen as Peaches O'Dell
- Saffron Burrows as Sophia Becker
- Jamie Chung as Kerstin Rhee
- David Harbour as Stephen Green
- Eric McCormack as Larry Becker
- Jennifer Morrison as Angela Anderson
- Lorraine Toussaint as Brenda Davis
- Carrie-Anne Moss as Penelope Nelson
- Richard Schiff as Dimitris Vargas
- Amanda Crew as Helena St. John
- Michelle Krusiec as Shannon Huang
- Chris Mulkey as Roger Fillmore
- Davey Havok as Jimmy McSorley
- Eddie George as Tony Blanchard
- Kurt Yaeger as Oliver Kennedy
- Shirley Manson as Nicole
- Brandon Scott as Max
- Frankie Shaw as Samantha
- Brooke Newton as Tawny Shearson

== Reception ==
The film received negative reviews from critics. On Rotten Tomatoes, the film has an approval rating of 28%. On Metacritic, the film has a score of 34 out of 100, indicating "generally unfavorable" reviews.
