= Richard Schiff =

American actor (born 1955)

- Schiff in 2026
- Born: May 27, 1955 (age 71); Bethesda, Maryland, United States
- Education: City College of New York
- Occupation: Actor
- Years active: 1983–present
- Spouse: Sheila Kelley (m. 1996)
- Children: 2
- Relatives: Clarence B. Jones (stepfather)

Richard Schiff (born May 27, 1955) is an American actor. He is best known for playing Toby Ziegler on The West Wing, a role for which he received an Emmy Award. Schiff made his television directorial debut with The West Wing, directing an episode titled "Talking Points". He is on the National Advisory Board of the Council for a Livable World. He had a recurring role on the HBO series Ballers. He had a leading role in ABC's medical drama The Good Doctor, as Dr. Aaron Glassman, and portrayed Odin in Santa Monica Studio's God of War: Ragnarök, released in 2022.

== Early life and education ==
Schiff was born on May 27, 1955, in Bethesda, Maryland, United States to Edward, a real estate lawyer, and Charlotte, a television and Broadway producer. His brothers are producer Paul Schiff and talent manager David Schiff. His parents divorced, with his mother later marrying Clarence B. Jones, Martin Luther King Jr.'s lawyer. His early jobs before acting included driving a taxi in New York City and cleaning buses in the Greyhound terminal on 11th Avenue. "It was a Teamster job, from 11pm to 7am. ... We cleaned the grease off bus wheels with diesel fuel. I also laid cable for Manhattan Cable Television. I was a Teamster in the International Brotherhood of Electrical Workers". Schiff and his family are Jewish. His grandfather was alleged to have connections to New York's Jewish Mafia, a background that inspired a plot line on The West Wing. He attended the Bronx High School of Science for a time but did not graduate, instead taking night classes at Washington Irving High School while working. He graduated in 1983 from City College of New York after initially dropping out and moving to Colorado. He studied acting at the William Esper Studio. His brother Paul Schiff was college roommates with his future West Wing cast mate Bradley Whitford.

== Career ==
Schiff initially studied directing. He directed several off-Broadway plays, including Antigone in 1983 with a just-graduated Angela Bassett. In the mid-1980s Schiff decided to try his hand at acting and landed several TV roles.

In the early 1990s, Schiff landed numerous small roles in a variety of films, including a train driver in Speed. In 1995, Schiff portrayed a lawyer defending the serial killer in Se7en. In 1996, he guest-starred on the TV series ER (season 2, episode 17), and appeared in NYPD Blue the following year. In 1996, he portrayed a corrupt probation officer in City Hall along with Al Pacino and John Cusack.

Schiff was seen by Steven Spielberg in an episode of the TV drama High Incident and was cast in The Lost World: Jurassic Park (1997) which led to being cast more frequently and eventually to the role of White House Communications Director Toby Ziegler in the television series The West Wing. Schiff became known for his reclusive and intense approach to his craft as well as his low-key delivery style. Schiff portrayed a doctor alongside Eddie Murphy in the 1998 Dr. Dolittle remake. He also portrayed Col./Brig. Gen. Robert Laurel Smith in the 1998 HBO TV movie The Pentagon Wars, based on the real-life development of the US Army's Bradley Infantry Fighting Vehicle. The same year, Schiff appeared in the movie Deep Impact. Schiff appeared in one episode of Becker during its first season.

In 2001, he acted in the movie What's the Worst That Could Happen? starring Martin Lawrence and Danny DeVito. He played the part of the tough lawyer Mr. Turner in I Am Sam opposite Sean Penn and Michelle Pfeiffer and co-starred in People I Know with Al Pacino. Schiff appeared in Ray as Jerry Wexler, shaving his beard for the role. After working on The West Wing for six seasons, Schiff chose to leave the series, fulfilling his contractual obligations by appearing in half of the final season's episodes. That same year, he starred alongside Peter Krause in Civic Duty.

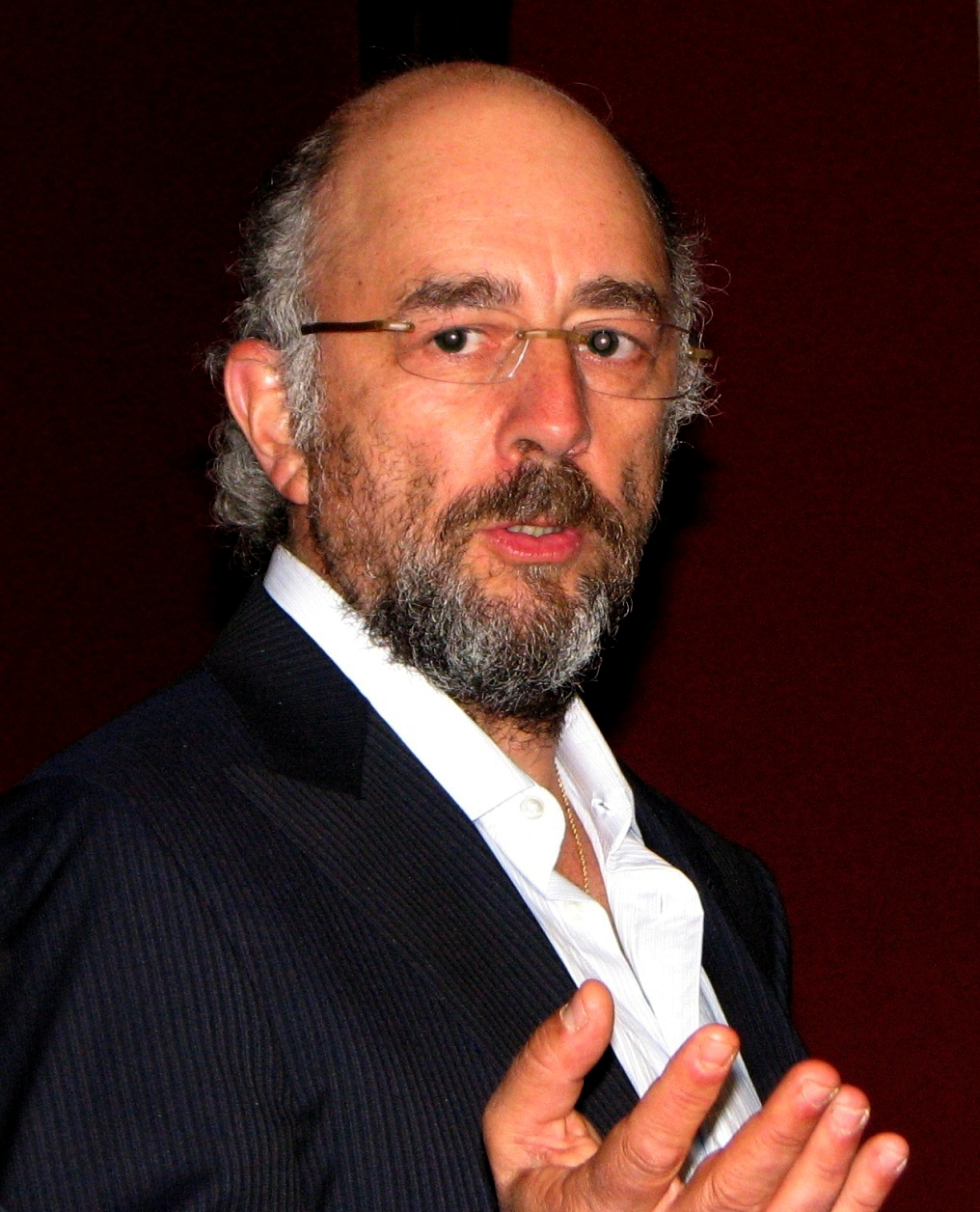
Schiff in May 2009

Schiff had a cameo appearance as himself in the second-season finale of the series Entourage. The scene has Schiff at lunch with his agent Ari Gold, where he declares a desire to act in action movies. He appeared again as a fictionalized version of himself in Entourage (2015). He also starred in the premiere run of Underneath the Lintel, a one-act, single-character play by Glen Berger, at the George Street Playhouse in New Brunswick, New Jersey. In February 2007, he appeared in the West End production of Underneath the Lintel in the Duchess Theatre in London, England, and appeared on BBC Radio 5 Live and talked at length to Simon Mayo about his experiences acting in The West Wing and his new West End production. In 2007, he appeared as Philip Cowen in the season finale of Burn Notice. A radio version of Underneath the Lintel, performed by Schiff, was broadcast by BBC Radio 4 on January 5, 2008. Schiff starred in Lanford Wilson's Talley's Folly at the McCarter Theatre Center in Princeton, New Jersey in fall 2008 as accountant Matt Friedman, opposite Margot White as Sally Talley. Later that year Schiff co-starred in Last Chance Harvey with Dustin Hoffman and Emma Thompson and Another Harvest Moon with Ernest Borgnine and appeared in the season finale of Eli Stone.

Schiff portrayed Charles Fischer in Terminator: The Sarah Connor Chronicles in the Season 2 episode "Complications". The character was a collaborator of Skynet and a traitor to the resistance. He was sent back in time to the present as a reward for his service to Skynet. He played an Orthodox rabbi on an episode of In Plain Sight with former West Wing co-star Mary McCormack. In 2009, he co-starred in the movies Imagine That, with Dr. Dolittle co-star Eddie Murphy, and Solitary Man, with Michael Douglas and Susan Sarandon. Later in 2009, he returned to London to shoot two other movies: The Infidel, in which he starred opposite Omid Djalili, and Made in Dagenham, with Sally Hawkins and Bob Hoskins. Schiff also appeared as a hypnotist in one episode of Monk's seventh season.

Schiff starred in Past Life. He also had a recurring role in Criminal Minds: Suspect Behavior as FBI Director Jack Fickler. Schiff had a recurring role in The Cape. He also has guest-starred on Any Human Heart with Jim Broadbent playing the role of a psychiatrist and on White Collar's second-season episode 15. He also played the role of an ex-CIA agent in a terrorist organization in Johnny English Reborn. In April 2011, Schiff returned to the London West End in the play Smash! He played opposite Rob Lowe in the drama Knife Fight, and starred opposite Josh Duhamel, Rosario Dawson and Bruce Willis in Fire with Fire. Schiff played an important plot character in three episodes of CBS's NCIS, bridging seasons 9 and 10, as Harper Dearing, the replacement for Osama bin Laden on the Most Wanted Wall for attacks against the United States Navy.

Schiff was cast to star in the Showtime series House of Lies, starring Kristen Bell and Don Cheadle. He also starred in the TV movie Innocent with Bill Pullman. He had a recurring guest role in the TV series Once Upon a Time and joined Helen Hunt and former West Wing star Bradley Whitford in the movie Decoding Annie Parker. Schiff starred in the political series Chasing The Hill.

In late 2012 and early 2013, he portrayed George Aaronow in a Broadway revival of Glengarry Glen Ross. He portrayed Erie Smith in a revival of the Eugene O'Neill play, Hughie, at the Shakespeare Theatre Company in Washington, D.C., in February and March 2013, and Dr. Emil Hamilton in Zack Snyder's 2013 Superman film, Man of Steel. In September 2014, Schiff returned to the West End in a revival of Speed-the-Plow by David Mamet, co-starring Lindsay Lohan. In 2015, Schiff appeared as Dwayne Johnson's character's boss on HBO's Ballers. Around the same time, he also had roles in the films Kill the Messenger, The Automatic Hate, and Take Me to the River. Schiff appeared on Mom in the episode "Pure Evil and a Free Piece of Cheesecake", in which he was reunited with his West Wing co-star Allison Janney.

Schiff had a regular role on the TNT's crime drama Murder in the First in 2014 as David Hertzberg. The show also starred Taye Diggs, Kathleen Robertson, and Tom Felton.

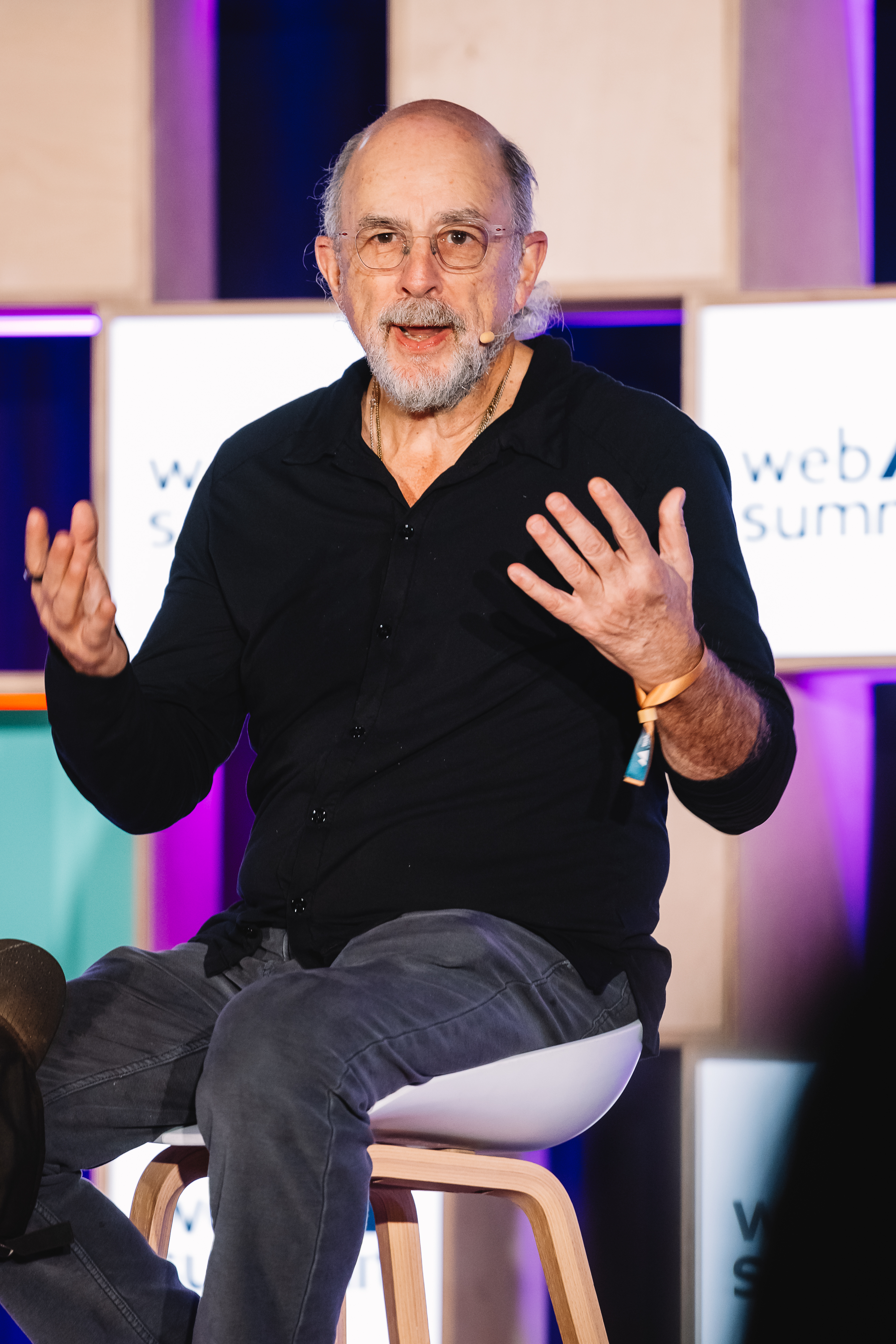
Schiff in 2024

He played Aaron Glassman on The Good Doctor from 2017 to 2024.

He provided the performance capture for Odin in Santa Monica Studio's 2022 video game God of War Ragnarök.

He appeared in the short film Swipe NYC released in 2023, and was the Ambassador of the Arts Recipient honoree at the 2024 North Fork TV Festival on Long Island.

In 2024, he was an executive producer of the documentary film Public Defender.

In spring 2025, he was set to appear on stage off-Broadway in a New York Theatre Workshop production of Becoming Eve based on the memoir by Abby Stein.

== Personal life ==
Schiff's first marriage to Sheryl Noethe ended in divorce. Schiff and actress Sheila Kelley married in 1996. Kelley played Schiff's character's love interest, and later his wife, on The Good Doctor. They have a son born in 1994, and a daughter born in August 2000. In 2024, Ruby portrayed the character of Hannah in the final season of The Good Doctor.

Schiff has supported Democratic candidates, but has said he is not a registered member of the party. He supported Barack Obama in the 2008 U.S. presidential election. Previously, he had endorsed then-Senator Joe Biden, before Biden dropped out. In 2016, Schiff supported Senator Bernie Sanders during the Democratic primaries. He endorsed Cynthia Nixon's bid for Governor of New York in the 2018 election. Schiff supported Joe Biden in the 2020 election. In September 2025 he was one of over 400 artists who signed an open letter from the American Civil Liberties Union in support of Jimmy Kimmel following ABC's suspension of Jimmy Kimmel Live!

On November 10, 2020, Schiff announced that he and his wife had tested positive for COVID-19 on Election Day and were quarantining at their home in Vancouver. The following Monday, he announced he was hospitalized, but "showing improvements" while Kelley was at home "doing better", but still sick. On November 19, 2020, Schiff was released from the hospital.

In 2026, Schiff signed a letter requesting leniency for OneTaste founder Nicole Daedone before her sentencing. Schiff's letter says Daedone "spent her life trying to bring compassion, awareness, and honesty to a part of human experience that is often shamed or misunderstood." Daedone was convicted for participation in a forced labor conspiracy in which she ordered multiple victims to perform uncompensated labor ranging from sex work with investors to menial domestic work. Several journalists have compared OneTaste to a cult and pyramid scheme. Daedone ultimately received a sentence of nine years imprisonment.

== Filmography ==
=== Film ===
Year	Title	Role	Notes
1987	Arena Brains	Deli Clerk	Short film
1988	Medium Straight	Pat Harding	
1990	Young Guns II	Rat Bag	
1992	Stop! Or My Mom Will Shoot	Gun Clerk	
1992	Rapid Fire	Art Teacher	
1992	The Public Eye	Thompson Street Photographer	
1992	Malcolm X	JFK Reporter	
1992	The Bodyguard	Skip Thomas	
1992	Hoffa	Government Attorney	
1993	Skinner	Eddie	
1993	My Life	Young Bill Ivanovich	
1993	Ghost in the Machine	Scanner Technician	
1994	The Hudsucker Proxy	Mailroom Screamer	
1994	Speed	Train Driver	
1994	Major League II	Commercial Director	
1995	Tank Girl	Trooper In Trench	
1995	Rough Magic	Marvin Wiggins	
1995	Se7en	Mark Swarr	
1996	City Hall	Larry Schwartz	
1996	The Arrival	Calvin	
1996	The Trigger Effect	Gun Shop Clerk	
1996	Grace of My Heart	Audition Record Producer	
1996	Michael	Italian Waiter	
1997	Touch	Jerry	
1997	Volcano	Haskins	
1997	The Lost World: Jurassic Park	Eddie Carr	
1998	Dr. Dolittle	Gene Reiss	
1998	Living Out Loud	Phil 'Philly' Francato	
1998	Deep Impact	Don Beiderman	
1998	Heaven	Stanner	
1998	The Pentagon Wars	Colonel R.L. Smith	
1999	Forces of Nature	Joe	
1999	Crazy in Alabama	Norman	
2000	Gun Shy	Elliot	
2000	Whatever It Takes	P.E. Teacher	
2001	I Am Sam	Mr. Turner	
2001	What's the Worst That Could Happen?	Walter Greenbaum	
2002	People I Know	Elliot Sharansky	
2004	Ray	Jerry Wexler	
2004	With It	Virgil LaRocca	Short film
2006	Civic Duty	Tom Hilary	
2007	Waiting	John	Short film
2007	Martian Child	Mr. Lefkowitz	
2008	Last Chance Harvey	Marvin	
2009	Imagine That	Carl Simons	
2009	Solitary Man	Steve Heller	
2009	Another Harvest Moon	Jeffery	
2010	The Infidel	Lenny Goldberg	
2010	Made in Dagenham	Robert Tooley	
2011	Johnny English Reborn	Titus Fisher	
2012	Knife Fight	Dimitris Vargas	
2013	Decoding Annie Parker	Mr. Allen	
2013	The Frozen Ground	Roy Hazelwood	
2013	Man of Steel	Emil Hamilton	
2014	Kill the Messenger	Richard Zuckerman / Walter Pincus	
2014	The Gambler	Jeweler	
2014	Before I Disappear	Bruce Warham	
2015	The Automatic Hate	Ronald Green	
2015	Entourage	Himself	
2015	Take Me to the River	Don	
2016	American Fable	Jonathan	
2017	Alien Code	Miles Driskoll	AKA The Men
2017	Shock and Awe	The Usual	
2017	Geostorm	Senator Thomas Cross	
2019	Clemency	Marty Lumetta	
2019	After Class	Jeff Cohen	
2022	Black Panther: Wakanda Forever	U.S. Secretary of State	

=== Television ===
Year	Title	Role	Notes
1988	Cheers	Tourist	Episode: "One Happy Chappy in a Snappy Serape"
1990	Tales from the Crypt	Lester Middleton	Episode: "Korman's Kalamity"
1992	Picket Fences	Joey Fero	Episode: "Pilot"
1992	L.A. Law	Dog Pound Operator	Episode: "Helter Shelter"
1993	South of Sunset	Bobby Bruck	Episode: "Dream Girl"
1993	Doogie Howser, M. D.	Billy Tishler	Episode: "What Makes Doogie Run"
1994	The John Larroquette Show	Wilson	Episode: "Don't Drink and Drive Nuclear Waste"
1994	Murphy Brown	Mel Woodworthy	Episode: "Anything but Cured"
1994	Saved by the Bell: Wedding in Las Vegas	Deputy Dano	Television film
1994	Thunder Alley	Pat Perkins	Episode: "Blood Suckers"
1994	Love & War	Lester Michaels	Episode: "The Bum"
1995	Maybe This Time	Pearlman	Episode: "Snitch Doggy-Dogg"
1995	NYPD Blue	Vartan Illiescu	Episode: "Bombs Away"
1995	Murder One	Professor Stanley Fletcher	Episode: "Chapter Nine"
1996	ER	Mr. Bartoli	Episode: "The Match Game"
1996	Chicago Hope	Mark Sarison	Episode: "Quiet Riot"
1996	Special Report: Journey to Mars	Eric Altman	Television film
1996–1997	Relativity	Barry Roth	17 episodes
1997	NYPD Blue	Steve Cameron	Episode: "Is Paris Burning?"
1998	The Practice	Bob Show	Episode: "Trees in the Forest"
1998	Brooklyn South	Chris McIntrick	Episode: "Cinnamon Buns"
1998	Ally McBeal	Bernie Gilson	Episode: "These Are the Days"
1998	The Pentagon Wars	Lieutenant Colonel / Brigadier General Robert Laurel Smith	Television film
1998	The Taking of Pelham One Two Three	Mr. Green	Television film
1999–2006	The West Wing	Toby Ziegler	141 episodes Primetime Emmy Award for Outstanding Supporting Actor in a Drama Series (2000); Screen Actors Guild Award for Outstanding Performance by an Ensemble in a Drama Series (2001–02); Nominated—Primetime Emmy Award for Outstanding Supporting Actor in a Drama Series (2001–02); Nominated—Screen Actors Guild Award for Outstanding Performance by an Ensemble in a Drama Series (2003–06)
1999	Becker	Barry	Episode: "Truth and Consequences"
1999	Roswell	Agent Stevens	3 episodes
2005	Entourage	Himself	Episode: "The Abyss"
2007	Burn Notice	Phillip Cowan	2 episodes
2008	Eli Stone	David Green	Episode: "Soul Free"
2008	Monk	Dr. Lawrence Climan	Episode: "Mr. Monk Gets Hypnotized"
2008	Terminator: The Sarah Connor Chronicles	Charles Fischer	Episode: "Complications"
2009	In Plain Sight	Samuel Garfinkel	Episode: "Aguna Matatala"
2010	Past Life	Dr. Malachi Talmadge	9 episodes
2010	Svetlana	Dr. Lawrence	Episode: "Eco-Shlong"
2010	Any Human Heart	Dr. Byrne	2 episodes
2011	The Cape	Patrick Portman	3 episodes
2011	White Collar	Andrew Stanzler	Episode: "Power Play"
2011	Criminal Minds: Suspect Behavior	Jack Fickler	4 episodes
2011	Up All Night	Dr. Dean Chafin	Episode: "Parents"
2012–2016	House of Lies	Harrison 'Skip' Galweather	9 episodes
2012	Once Upon a Time	King Leopold	2 episodes
2012	Fire with Fire	Harold Gether	Television Movie
2012	The Mindy Project	Doctor	Episode: "Pilot"
2012	NCIS	Harper Dearing	3 episodes
2013	Bones	Professor Leon Watters	Episode: "The Spark in the Park"
2014	Murder in the First	David Hertzberg	10 episodes
2014	Key and Peele	Ambassador	Episode: "Sex Addict Wendell"
2014–2015	Manhattan	Occam	9 episodes
2015	Wet Hot American Summer: First Day of Camp	Dean Fairchild	Episode: "Auditions"
2015–2017	Rogue	Marty Stein	22 episodes
2015–2019	Ballers	Brett Anderson	26 episodes
2015–2019	The Affair	Jon Gottlief	12 episodes
2016	The Grinder	Gordon Stutz	2 episodes
2016	Mom	Robert	Episode: "Pure Evil and a Free Piece of Cheesecake"
2016	Dirk Gently's Holistic Detective Agency	Detective Zimmerfield	5 episodes
2017	When We Rise	Judge Vaughn Walker	2 episodes
2017	Chicago Justice	Frank Linden	Episode: "Tycoon"
2017	Jean-Claude Van Johnson	Alan Morris	2 episodes
2017–2024	The Good Doctor	Dr. Aaron Glassman	121 episodes
2018	Castle Rock	Warden Porter's Superior (voice)	Episode: "Harvest"
2018–2019	Counterpart	Roland Fancher	7 episodes
2020	Psych 2: Lassie Come Home	Dr. Hirsch	Television film
2020	A West Wing Special to Benefit When We All Vote	Toby Ziegler	Television special
2022	Super Pumped	Randall Pearson	Episodes: "Grow or Die" and "War"
2026	The Westies	Ruby Stein	3 episodes
TBA	War	Elliott Wyatt	Upcoming series
TBA	The Best of Us		Upcoming series

== Stage ==
Year	Title	Role	Venue	Ref.
2001	Nightfall	Performer	New York Stage and Film, New York	
2006	Underneath the Lintel	The Librarian	George Street Playhouse, New Jersey	
2007	Underneath the Lintel	The Librarian	Duchess Theatre, West End	
2008	Talley's Folly	Matt Friedman	McCarter Theatre, New Jersey	
2011	Smash!	Bebe	Menier Chocolate Factory, Off-West End	
2012	Glengarry Glen Ross	George Aaronow	Gerald Schoenfeld Theater, Broadway	
2013	Hughie	Erie Smith	Shakespeare Theatre Company, D.C.	
2013	The Chosen	Reb Saunders	Barrington Stage Company, Massachusetts	
2013	Parfumerie	Mr. Hammerschmidt	Wallis Annenberg Center for the Performing Arts, Los Angeles	
2014	Speed-the-Plow	Bobby Gould	Playhouse Theatre, West End	
2025	Becoming Eve	Tati	Abrons Arts Center, Off-Broadway	
2026	Copenhagen	Niels Bohr	Hampstead Theatre	

== Video games ==
Year	Title	Role	Notes
2022	God of War Ragnarök	Odin	Facial, motion capture & voice acting
