= Alexander Harvey =

Alexander Harvey may refer to:

- Alexander Harvey II (1923–2017), US federal judge
- Alexander Gordon Cummins Harvey, British cotton manufacturer and merchant
- Alexander Miller Harvey (1867–1928), Kansas lawyer, politician, and author
- Alex Harvey (country musician) (1941–2020), American singer-songwriter

== See also ==
- Alex Harvey (disambiguation)
- William Alexander Harvey (1874–1951), English architect
