= Serge Lamothe =

French-Canadian writer (born 1963)

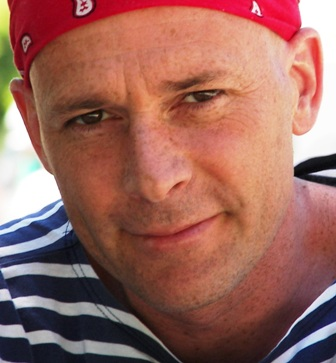
- Born: February 15, 1963 (age 63); Quebec City, Quebec, Canada
- Citizenship: Born Canadian, acquired French citizenship in 2003
- Occupations: Novelist, poet, dramaturg, translator

Serge Lamothe (born February 15, 1963) is a French-Canadian writer.

== Education ==
He holds a master's degree in literature from Laval University in Quebec City.

== Career ==
He was a member of the board and vice president, in 2005, of UNEQ (Quebec Writers Union). From 2006 to 2015, he was a member of the board of the FIL (International Festival of Literature) in Montreal, Canada.

=== Theater ===
- Le Prince de Miguasha, radio play, Radio-Canada, 2003.
- Rapports intimes, translation & adaptation of Intimate Exchanges by Alan Ayckbourn, 2003.
- Le Procès de Kafka, stage adaptation of The Trial, by Franz Kafka, 2004.
- Le fusil de chasse, stage adaptation of The Hunting Gun, by Yasushi Inoue, 2010.
- Kinkaku-ji, stage adaptation of The Temple of the Golden Pavilion by Yukio Mishima, directed by Amon Miyamoto, Kanagawa Arts Theatre, Tokyo, and Lincoln Center, NYC, 2011.
- Waiting for Godot, by Samuel Beckett, dramatist, directed by François Girard, Théâtre du Nouveau Monde, Montreal, 2016.
- Underneath the Lintel, by Glen Berger, dramatist and translation to French (Zebrina – Une pièce à conviction), directed by François Girard, Théâtre du Nouveau Monde and Segal Centre, Montreal, 2020.

=== Circus ===
- 2008 Zed, dramatist, Cirque du Soleil, directed by François Girard, Tokyo.
- 2011 Zarkana, dramatist, Cirque du Soleil, directed by François Girard, Radio City Music Hall (NYC), Madrid Arena (Spain), State Kremlin Palace (Moscow) and Aria Resort, Las Vegas.

=== Opera (with director François Girard) ===
- 2006 The Seven Deadly Sins & Lindbergh's Flight, dramaturg, libretti by Bertolt Brecht, music by Kurt Weill, Opéra National de Lyon, France.
- 2010 Émilie, dramaturg, libretto by Amin Maalouf, music by Kaija Saariaho, Opéra National de Lyon, France.
- 2012 Parsifal, dramaturg, libretto and music by Richard Wagner, Opéra national de Lyon, France, Metropolitan Opera, New York (2013).
- 2019 The Flying Dutchman, (Der Fliegende Holländer), dramaturg, libretto and music by Richard Wagner, Grand Théâtre de Québec.
- 2020 The Flying Dutchman, (Der Fliegende Holländer), dramaturg, libretto and music by Richard Wagner, Metropolitan Opera, New York.
- 2022 Lohengrin (opera), dramaturg, libretto and music by Richard Wagner, Bolshoi Theatre, Moscow.
- 2023 Lohengrin (opera), dramaturg, libretto and music by Richard Wagner, Metropolitan Opera, New York.

== Bibliography ==
- La longue portée, novel, L'instant même, Quebec, (1998). ISBN 2-89502-103-1
- La tierce personne, novel, L'instant même, Quebec, (2000). ISBN 2-89502-135-X
- L'ange au berceau, novel, L'instant même, Quebec, (2002). ISBN 2-89502-172-4
- Les Baldwin, novel, L'instant même, Quebec, (2004). ISBN 2-89502-196-1
- The Baldwins, novel, (English translation by Fred A. Reed & David Homel), Talonbooks, Vancouver, (2006). ISBN 0-88922-544-3
- Tu n'as que ce sang, poetry, Mémoire d'encrier, Montreal, (2005). ISBN 2-923153-44-8
- Le Procès de Kafka et Le Prince de Miguasha, theater, Alto, Quebec, (2005). ISBN 2-89518-222-1
- Tarquimpol, novel, Alto, Quebec, (2007). ISBN 978-2-923550-04-6
- Métarevers, novel, Coups de tête, Montreal, (2009). ISBN 978-2-923603-12-4
- Projet Perfecto, short story, Alto, Quebec, (2010). ISBN 978-2-923550-39-8
- Les Urbanishads, poetry, Le lézard amoureux, Quebec, (2010). ISBN 978-2-923398-17-4
- Le nid de l'aigle, short stories, (photos by Sébastien Cliche) J'Ai Vu, Quebec, (2010). ISBN 978-2-922763-30-0
- Les Enfants lumière, novel, Alto, Quebec, (2012). ISBN 978-2-89694-078-3
- Ma terre est un fond d'océan, poetry, Mémoire d'encrier, Montreal, (2016) ISBN 978-2-89712-417-5
- Mi tierra es un fondo de océano, poetry, (Spanish translation by Evelio Miñano Martinez), La Lucerna, Palma de Mallorca, (2023) ISBN 978-84-124036-3-3
- Mektoub, novel, Alto, Quebec, (2016). ISBN 978-2-89694-290-9
- Oshima, novel, Alto, Quebec, (2019) ISBN 978-2-89694-439-2
- Oshima, novel, (Spanish translation by Evelio Miñano Martinez) Editorial Verbum, Madrid, (2021) ISBN 978-84-1337-706-3
- Des nouvelles de la posthistoire, short stories, Le Lys Bleu, Paris, France, (2021) ISBN 979-10-377-2491-5
- Les Urbanishads et autres poèmes, poetry (with drawings by the author) Stellamaris, Brest, France (2021) ISBN 978-2-36868-761-1
- Quand tu pars, poetry, Les éditions Mains libres, Montreal, (2024) ISBN 978-2-925197-64-5

== Awards ==
- 2003 Yves-Thériault Award from Radio-Canada for The Prince of Miguasha, author
- 2006 Herald Angels Award for Best production Edinburgh International Festival, pour Die sieben Todsünden
  The Seven Deadly Sins, directed by François Girard, dramaturg
- 2008 Prix des libraires du Québec for the novel Tarquimpol, finalist
- 2011 Kinokuniya Theatre Prize for Hunting Gun, Japan, stage adaptation
- 2011 Yomiuri Prize for Hunting Gun, Japan, stage adaptation
- 2012 Prix du Syndicat de la critique, Prix Claude Rostand, for Parsifal, Lyon, France, dramaturg
- 2014 Diapason d'or from Diapason for the DVD of Parsifal at the MET, dramaturg
- 2016 Prix littéraire des collégiens for the novel Mektoub, finalist
- 2019 Prix Opus, Concert of the year for Richard Wagner's Der Fliegende Holländer, Opera Festival of Québec, dramaturg
- 2020 Prix des Horizons imaginaires for the novel Oshima, finalist
