= Mark D. Fabiani =

American writer and politician

- Born: 1957 (age 68–69)
- Citizenship: United States
- Education: University of Redlands (BA.), Harvard University (JD.)
- Occupations: Political strategist, Crisis management expert
- Known for: Co-founder of Fabiani & LeHane LLC
- Title: Principal, Fabiani & LeHane LLC
- Website: Fabiani & Associates

Mark D. Fabiani (born 1957) is an American political strategist, crisis management expert, former Deputy Mayor of Los Angeles and chief of staff to Mayor Tom Bradley, and former White House lawyer and spokesman. He is recognized for his work as special counsel to President Bill Clinton and legal spokesperson for the Clinton White House from 1994 through 1996, as well as for his work as head of communications for the Gore presidential campaign in 2000. He also served in senior positions at the Department of Housing and Urban Development and at the Department of Justice.

Fabiani and his business partner, Chris Lehane, were dubbed the "Masters of Disaster" by Newsweek as a result of the rapid-response strategy the pair employed throughout the Clinton Administration. In 2004, San Francisco Mayor Gavin Newsom described Fabiani as "the best the Democrats have got." The pair operate the California-based strategic communications firm Fabiani & Lehane LLC.

Since 2002, Fabiani has served as special counsel to San Diego Chargers president Dean Spanos.

== Education ==
Fabiani graduated Phi Beta Kappa with a Bachelor of Arts in philosophy from the University of Redlands. He earned his Juris Doctor from Harvard University, graduating cum laude in 1982. While at Harvard, Fabiani served as an editor of the Harvard Law Review and as the lead research assistant for Professor Alan Dershowitz. Fabiani was top speaker at the (collegiate) National Debate Tournament in 1979.

== Career ==
=== Los Angeles Mayor's chief of staff ===
Fabiani became Los Angeles Mayor Tom Bradley's chief of staff in 1989. The LA Times reported that friends and rivals alike described Fabiani, who was 32 years old at the time, as a "boy wonder" within the Los Angeles political scene. The Los Angeles Times also reported that Fabiani received credit for restoring the Mayor's popularity, which had previously been at an all-time low. Prior to his appointment as chief of staff, Fabiani had served as legal advisor to the mayor since 1985.

=== Los Angeles Deputy Mayor ===
In 1989, Fabiani was also appointed Deputy Mayor of Los Angeles. During that period, he managed the political strategy and media relations of the Office of the Mayor, and was involved in preparing and negotiating the city's $3.9 billion annual budget. Fabiani's tenure coincided with reform efforts at the Los Angeles Police Department (LAPD), and it was during this time that police chief Daryl Gates agreed to resign over concerns raised about the LAPD in the wake of the Rodney King beating, including allegations of mismanagement and racism in the department.

=== US Department of Justice and Department of Housing and Urban Development ===
Fabiani served as a deputy assistant attorney general at the Justice Department, and as deputy assistant secretary at the Department of Housing and Urban Development (HUD). He helped develop policy for Attorney General of the United States Janet Reno at the Justice Department and implemented the federal government's Empowerment Zone Initiative for urban revitalization while serving at HUD.

=== White House legal spokesman and special counsel to President Clinton ===
From 1994 through 1996, Fabiani was special counsel to President Bill Clinton. He provided legal and political counsel to the President and First Lady of the United States on various controversies of the era, including Whitewater, the White House travel office, and campaign fundraising. It was during this time that Newsweek called him and his now-business partner Chris Lehane the "Masters of Disaster" owing to their quick-response media strategy.

=== Deputy campaign manager for communications and strategy, "Gore for President 2000" campaign ===
In June 2000, Vice President Al Gore asked Fabiani to serve as the deputy campaign manager for communications and strategy for the "Gore for President 2000" campaign. During the campaign, Fabiani coordinated the campaign's media and communications daily tactics and overall strategy, and was the campaign's chief spokesperson. Fabiani was also involved in the aftermath of the Florida election recount.

=== Strategic communications ===
Fabiani and business partner Chris Lehane founded the strategic communications firm Fabiani & Lehane in 2001. The California-based company specializes in crisis management, image management, and strategic guidance for public companies, trade groups, and political candidates. In addition to its headquarters in San Francisco, Fabiani & Lehane has offices in Los Angeles and San Diego.

In 2010, Lance Armstrong announced that he had hired Fabiani to help manage fallout from doping allegations against the cyclist.

In 2017, Fox News Channel lead anchor Bill O'Reilly hired Fabiani as O'Reilly faced fallout from multiple charges of sexual harassment on the job, settlements paid to five accusers by Fox and a new complaint from Wendy Walsh, a former guest on O'Reilly's show.

=== San Diego Chargers ===
Fabiani has served as special counsel to San Diego Chargers president Dean Spanos since 2002. Fabiani was paid millions to be involved with the team's failed attempts to replace Qualcomm Stadium with a state-of-the-art facility, which would have been largely publicly financed.

== Bibliography ==
Fabiani co-wrote the book Masters of Disaster: The Ten Commandments of Damage Control with Chris Lehane and Bill Guttentag. The book was published by Macmillan in December 2012.
