= Alex Harvey (director) =

- Born: Denver, Colorado, United States
- Education: BA in directing and ethnomusicology
- Alma mater: Northwestern University
- Occupations: Film director; theater director; writer; producer; musician
- Years active: 2003â€“present

Alex Harvey is an American filmmaker and musician. He has directed several films, including Walden: Life in the Woods which screened at numerous festivals and released on digital platforms. He has also directed numerous regional theater productions including Underneath the Lintel and I Am My Own Wife.

Harvey is a mandolin player and was in GEICO's nationwide "Happier than" ad campaigns. He is a member of The ReMemberers, a folk trio he founded in 2022. He is also a member of the ragtime band Flophouse Follies and the old world folk project Shinbone Alley. Harvey serves as the arts and music programmer at Race Brook Lodge and is the programmer for the annual Down County Jump Music Festival.

== Early life and education ==
Alex Harvey was born and raised in Denver, Colorado. He attended Graland Country Day School there as a child and East High School as a teenager. He ultimately graduated high school from Colorado Academy in 1999. Growing up, he acted in numerous high school and community theater productions. After high school, he attended Northwestern University, earning degrees in directing and ethnomusicology. He also directed stage productions while at Northwestern.

== Career ==
=== Theatre director ===
One of Harvey's first professional stage credits after graduating from Northwestern was as the director of General Desdemona, which was staged during the Edinburgh Festival Fringe in August 2004. Harvey later relocated to New York City. In 2007, he directed a production of I Am My Own Wife which was staged in both Des Moines, Iowa (at the Civic Center of Greater Des Moines) and Houston, Texas (at the Stages Repertory Theatre). This would lead to him directing several other plays in the Houston area in 2008, including Underneath the Lintel (Alley Theatre) and Mr. Marmalade (Stages).

In 2009, when Harvey was the artist-in-residence at the University of California, Berkeley's Arts Research Center, he co-wrote an operatic adaptation of Michael Pollan's 2001 book, The Botany of Desire. He worked with both Pollan and fellow artist-in-residence John Gromada to devise the musical. A reading of the adaptation was performed at Berkeley in April 2009. In March 2010, Harvey directed the students of the American Conservatory Theater's MFA program in a production of O Lovely Glowworm, or Scenes of Great Beauty at San Francisco's Zeum Theater.

In January 2011, Harvey returned to the Stages Repertory Theater in Houston where he directed a production of Oh, the Humanity. Later that year, he co-directed (with Melissa Kievman and Brian Mertes) a production of Balm in Gilead, which was staged for one night in an empty warehouse in Industry City in Brooklyn's Sunset Park neighborhood.

In August 2013, Harvey directed Waiting for Waiting for Godot which was staged during the New York International Fringe Festival. It went on to be honored with the Overall Excellence Award by the festival and was given a brief extended run of three nights the following month. Throughout this time, Harvey taught at New York University's Tisch School of the Arts, directing and writing productions for graduate students including stagings of an adaptation of Vladimir Nabokov's Pale Fire and an adaptation of Henrik Ibsen's Peer Gynt called Peer@Me.

=== Musician ===
Beginning in 2012, Harvey started appearing in a variety of GEICO insurance ads for the nationwide "Happier than" campaign in which he played the mandolin. He would later appear as the featured mandolin and tenor guitar player on the Michael Cerveris & Loose Cattle album, North of Houston (2014), and other subsequent recordings.

In 2022, Harvey founded The ReMemberers, a folk trio where he serves as the mandolinist. The group, which also includes Violet Southard and John de Kadt, focuses on mythological and folkloric storytelling through music.

Harvey also serves as the arts and music programmer at Race Brook Lodge in Sheffield, Massachusetts, where he programs concerts and music events. He serves as the artistic programmer for the Down County Jump Music Festival and has produced the venue's annual DÃa de los Muertos celebration since 2023.

Harvey is a member of Flophouse Follies, a Berkshire-based ragtime band he formed with Heather Fisch that performs ragtime-era pop songs. He also leads Shinbone Alley, an old world folk project focused on street ballads and songs of the sea.

=== Filmmaker ===
In 2016, Harvey began filming for Walden: Life in the Woods supported in part by an incentive grant from the Colorado Economic Development Commission. Walden is loosely based on the Henry David Thoreau book of the same name. Harvey had been devising the film with a group of other Colorado natives as far back as 2009. Demián Bichir and T.J. Miller were added to the cast in August 2016. The film was shot and set entirely in Colorado and had its premiere at the Denver Film Festival in November 2017. It went on to appear at numerous film festivals in 2017 and 2018 including the Whistler Film Festival, RiverRun International Film Festival, and Oaxaca FilmFest. It received a wide release on various digital platforms in October 2019.

Harvey also co-directed (with director Brian Mertes) the film, I Am a Seagull, a hybrid narrative film and documentary that follows the Lake Lucille Chekhov Project as it stages its annual production of Anton Chekhov's The Seagull. It premiered in March 2018 in New York City. Harvey also directed a black-and-white silent film called, The Unsilent Picture, which stars Bill Irwin. It was screened throughout October 2018 in a tent theater at the Philipsburg Manor in Sleepy Hollow, New York, and each showing was accompanied by a live soundtrack.

In 2023, Harvey released space//space, a film he wrote and directed. In 2024 he produced the documentary The Last Ecstatic Days.

== Credits ==
=== Film ===
Year	Title	Role	Notes
2017	Walden: Life in the Woods	Director	Wide release in October 2019
2018	I Am a Seagull	Co-director, creative producer	
2018	The Unsilent Picture	Director	Silent film
2023	space//space	Director and writer	Appeared in Anthology Film Archive's Special Screening Program

=== Theatre ===
Year	Title	Role	Dates	Venue	Notes
2004	General Desdemona	Director	August 9–27, 2004	Rocket@DeMarco Roxy Art House	Edinburgh Festival Fringe
2006	The Bird and Mr. Banks	Director	? – May 13, 2006	Live Bait Theatre (Chicago)	World Premiere play by Keith Huff
2007	I Am My Own Wife	Director	March 23 – April 7, 2007	Civic Center of Greater Des Moines	Regional; StageWest Theatre Company
2007	I Am My Own Wife	Director	April 13 – May 10, 2007	Stages Repertory Theatre (Houston)	Regional
2008	Underneath the Lintel	Director	March 21 – April 20, 2008	Alley Theatre (Houston)	Regional
2008	Mr. Marmalade	Director	May 16 – June 1, 2008	Stages Repertory Theatre	Regional
2009	The Botany of Desire	Co-writer	April 24, 2009	Wheeler Auditorium (University of California, Berkeley)	Reading of a musical adaptation
2010	O Lovely Glowworm, or Scenes of Great Beauty	Director	March 4–20, 2010	Zeum Theatre (San Francisco)	American Conservatory Theater MFA program
2011	Oh, the Humanity	Director	January 26 – February 20, 2011	Stages Repertory Theatre	Regional
2011	Balm in Gilead	Co-director	June 5, 2011	Warehouse in Industry City, Sunset Park, Brooklyn	
2013	Waiting for Waiting for Godot	Director	August 21–25, 2013	The Kraine Theater	New York International Fringe Festival
2013	Waiting for Waiting for Godot	Director	September 14–16, 2013	The Players Theatre	New York International Fringe Festival
