= Orlando Theatre Project =

Former theatre company

The Orlando Theatre Project was a nonprofit professional theatre company based in Sanford, Florida, near Orlando. The company was founded in 1985 and operates under an Actors' Equity Association contract.

The company was in residence at Seminole Community College and produced some of its plays with the college, enabling students to work with the company. The company also staged some of its shows at Orlando Repertory Theatre (now Orlando Family Stage) in Orlando's Loch Haven Park.

Most of the Orlando Theatre Project's productions were contemporary plays which had been previously produced on Broadway, Off-Broadway, in the United Kingdom or in regional theatres in the United States.

Orlando Theatre Project closed in 2009 after 23 years of operation citing the poor economy.
