= Glen Berger =

American playwright and scriptwriter

Glen Berger is an American playwright and scriptwriter. He has received commissions from the Children’s Theater of Minneapolis, Berkeley Repertory Theatre, the Alley Theatre, and the Lookingglass Theater.

In 2010, he co-wrote the book for Spider-Man: Turn Off the Dark, a musical adaptation of Spider-Man, directed by Julie Taymor with music and lyrics by Bono and The Edge of U2. The show had a famously troubled production, and in 2013, Berger wrote an account of his experiences, Song of Spider-Man - The Inside Story of the Most Controversial Musical in Broadway History.

Berger has also written scripts for animated children's TV shows, including Arthur, Peep and the Big Wide World, Time Warp Trio, Fetch! with Ruff Ruffman, Big & Small, Octonauts, Molly of Denali, and Curious George. Berger won two Daytime Emmy Awards for Fetch! with Ruff Ruffman and Peep and the Big Wide World, and was nominated twelve times for various series.

He is an alumnus of New Dramatists. He is currently working on a trilogy about America, psychedelics, and agriculture.

== Awards ==
- Two Emmys (twelve Emmy nominations), writing over 100 episodes for children’s television series.
- 1998 Ovation Award for Best Play, for Great Men of Science, Nos. 21 & 22
- A.S.K. Playwriting Award

== Works ==
- Underneath the Lintel, produced Off Broadway, 2003. Published by Broadway Play Publishing Inc.
- The Wooden Breeks, produced at the Lucille Lortel Theatre, New York, 2006 (World Premier production at Annex Theatre, Seattle, 1991. Published by Rain City Projects 1991.)
- O Lovely Glowworm, published by Broadway Play Publishing Inc.
- Great Men of Science, Nos. 21 & 22, published by Broadway Play Publishing Inc.
- I Will Go... I Will Go...
- On Words and Onwards (book & lyrics; music by Frank London)
- A Night in the Old Marketplace (book & lyrics; music by Frank London)
- Trepidation Nation, Humana Festival, Actors Theatre of Louisville, KY, 2003
- Max & Ruby, Lucille Lortel Theatre, NY, 2007
- Tales From The Faucet, And Other Stories, Soho Playhouse, NY, 2009
- Darwinii: The Comeuppance of Man, with Brett Keyser. Nightjar Apothecary, 2009
- Spider-Man: Turn Off the Dark, Foxwoods Theatre, Broadway, 2010
- Song of Spider-Man - The Inside Story of the Most Controversial Musical in Broadway History by Glen Berger published by Simon & Schuster 2013
