= Effect of the 2007–08 Writers Guild of America strike on television =

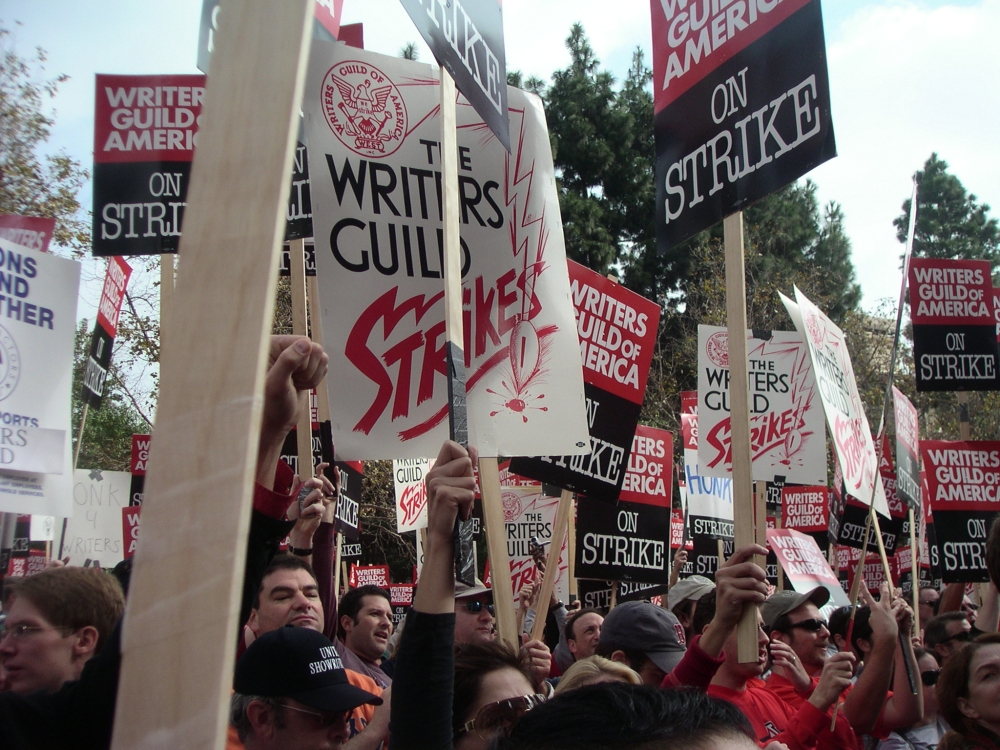
November 2007 striking writers and supporters rally in Los Angeles

The 2007–08 Writers Guild of America strike, which began on November 5, 2007, was a labor conflict that affected a large number of television shows that were due to be broadcast in the United States during the 2007–2008 television season. Negotiators for the striking writers reached a tentative agreement on February 8, 2008, and the boards of both guilds unanimously approved the deal on February 10, 2008. Striking writers voted on February 12, 2008, to end the strike immediately, and on February 26, the WGA announced that the contract had been ratified with a 93.6% approval among WGA members.

== Effect on shows ==
=== Shows with increased number of episodes ===
Some shows, especially unscripted or reality shows, benefitted from the strike by providing the networks with new material.

Show	Network:	Notes
The Amazing Race	CBS	Originally only one season (The Amazing Race 12) was planned for the 2007–2008 season. A second season of the show (The Amazing Race 13) was greenlit shortly after the start of the strike, although it did not air till the following TV season with the premiere airing on September 28, 2008. The season finale aired on December 7, 2008.
Big Brother	CBS	Originally only one season was planned for the show's traditional summer slot in 2008. Due to the writer's strike, a second season for 2008 was ordered. Big Brother 9 aired in the winter-spring period and premiered Tuesday, February 12, 2008, with three episodes per week. Big Brother 10 aired during the summer and premiered Sunday, July 13, 2008, with three episodes per week.
Good News Week	Network Ten (Australia)	Meant to be a one-off special, new episodes were made for the first time in 7 years to fill gap left by lack of US product. The new run lasted until 2011, with a final special in 2012.
The Price Is Right, Power of 10	CBS	In response to the strike, CBS ordered 10 primetime The Price is Right $1,000,000 Spectacular specials, the first to feature then-new host Drew Carey. They aired on Friday nights beginning February 22, 2008. CBS also ordered additional episodes of the Carey-hosted quiz show Power of 10.

=== Unaffected shows ===
Some shows were not affected by the strike, being unscripted, not using union writers, or completing their production before the strike began. Some shows made in Canada use mainly or solely Canadian writers and were thus unaffected by the US strike.

Show	Network	Notes
Eureka	Sci Fi	All 13 episodes of season 2 were shown. Season 3 was produced over a longer period due to the strike.
Jericho	CBS	All 7 episodes for season 2 were completed before the strike
All My Children	ABC	Scripts were completed through January 2008.
Duel	ABC	Only Big Three network game show to premiere whole series during the strike. Second season as weekly series premiered on April 4, 2008, and ended on July 25, 2008, for 10 episodes.
The Bold and the Beautiful	CBS	Scripts were completed through January 2008.
Days of Our Lives	NBC	Scripts were completed through January 2008.
Guiding Light	CBS	Scripts were completed through February 2008.
One Life to Live	ABC	Scripts were completed through January 2008.
Passions	The 101 Network	Scripts were completed through February 2008
The View	ABC	Continued, with a statement by the network that "contingency plans have been made in the event of a strike."
Carpoolers	ABC	All 13 ordered episodes were completed.
The Closer	TNT	All 15 episodes of season 3 made
Curb Your Enthusiasm	HBO	Had not been renewed for a seventh season until after the strike
Dexter	Showtime	All episodes completed of Season 2 before strike. Production started early in anticipation. Season 1 re-purposed on CBS due to lack of new content.
Eli Stone	ABC	All 13 ordered episodes were completed. Premiered January 31, 2008.
Everybody Hates Chris	The CW	All 22 episodes completed, returned on March 3.
Kyle XY	ABC Family	All 23 episodes completed. New episodes began January 14, 2008. 10 more episodes ordered in October, before the strike.
Lincoln Heights	ABC Family	Was not renewed for a third season until after the strike
Mad Men	AMC	Lionsgate side deal made, production resumed on scripts for summer airing.
Monk	USA	All 16 episodes completed.
New Amsterdam	FOX	All 8 episodes completed. Premiered March 4, 2008.
October Road	ABC	All 13 ordered episodes for season 2 were completed.
Psych	USA	All 16 episodes completed.
The Shield	FX	All 13 ordered episodes were completed.
South Park	Comedy Central	Show creators Trey Parker and Matt Stone were not members of the union, and continued writing and producing the show at the beginning of the strike with the final two episodes of season 11 airing as planned. The show was on a scheduled hiatus for the rest of the strike's duration.
Stargate Atlantis	Sci Fi	All of Season 4 was completed. Most writers are members of the Writers Guild of Canada. It was reported that the broadcast schedule would potentially be affected because of the broader effects of the strike.
The Wire	HBO	All 10 episodes were completed for the final season.

==== Unscripted shows ====
Show	Network	Notes
Poker After Dark	NBC	Continued production airing original episodes; unaffected by the strike.

==== Shows with writing completed before strike ====
Show	Network	Notes
10 Items or Less	TBS	All 8 ordered episodes were completed.
About a Girl	The N	All 13 episodes were completed.
American Dad!	Fox	All 22 ordered episodes had been written.
Cane	CBS	All 13 ordered episodes were completed.
Jericho	CBS	All 7 ordered episodes were completed.

==== Shows that switched to non-union writers ====
Show	Network	Notes
All My Children	ABC	On January 15, 2008, the soap was written by Julie Hanan Carruthers and Brian Frons replacing James Harmon Brown and Barbara Esensten who returned on January 31
As the World Turns	CBS	Entire writing staff was on strike. Material written by non-union writers airing as of January 25, 2008 until the end of the strike.
General Hospital	ABC	Using financial core and strikebreaker material as of January 4, 2008. Writing led by non-striking guild member Garin Wolf. Head writer Robert Guza Jr. and his staff returned after the strike.
One Life to Live	ABC	As of February 15, 2008, Gary Tomlin took over as head writer for the soap replacing Ron Carlivati who returned on May 2.
Power Rangers	ABC/Toon Disney	Much of the remainder of Power Rangers Jungle Fury was written by former Power Rangers writer Judd Lynn, who was not a WGA member at the time, using various pseudonyms. The final three episodes (plus a fourth episode, written out of order) were written by longtime series writer Jackie Marchand and John Tellegen upon the strike's end. A fifth episode, "Maryl and the Monkeys," was originally credited in released synopses to a writer named Sal N. Mitchell but when it aired, the episode was credited to executive producer Bruce Kalish.
The Young and the Restless	CBS	Writing taken over by non-striking guild members Josh Griffith and Maria Arena Bell (the daughter-in-law of the show's creator William J. Bell), among others. Griffith/Bell material aired starting December 26, 2007. Lynn Marie Latham and three of her writers were terminated as of February 13, 2008.

==== Shows airing off-season ====
Show	Network	Notes
Burn Notice	USA	Season 2 premiered unaffected. The full season of 16 episodes were aired.
Miss Guided	ABC	Writing was halted, but all 7 planned episodes aired.
Weeds	Showtime	Weeds was not scheduled to start filming until April 2008 for a summer debut, however, Lionsgate made a side deal to avert a production halt and remained unaffected, airing as planned in August.
It's Always Sunny in Philadelphia	FX	Renewed for a fourth season was composed of 13 episodes that aired in fall 2008.
Canterbury's Law	Fox	All 6 ordered episodes were completed. Premiered on March 10, 2008.

=== Shows delayed or interrupted by the strike ===
Some shows ran out of episodes, but caught up to their ordered amount after the strike. Some other shows, such as talk shows, were interrupted, but made arrangements to return to screens early.

Show	Network	Date stopped	Date restarted	Episodes made before strike	Episodes made after strike	Notes
According to Jim	ABC	March 11, 2008		11 of 18	7	Most of the actors in this show, including James Belushi, struck with the writers.
South of Nowhere	The N	September 8, 2008	September 2008	16 of 16		Initially set to air final episodes starting in February. The April 2008 airing of the remaining episodes from the third season were pushed back to September.
Women's Murder Club	ABC	January 4, 2008	April 2008	10 of 13	3	
The Colbert Report	Comedy Central	Reruns began on November 5, 2007.	January 7, 2008 (without writers).	N/A	N/A	Pronunciation of show title changed for the length of the strike.
The Colbert Report	Comedy Central	Reruns began on November 5, 2007.	February 13, 2008 (with writers)	N/A	N/A	Pronunciation of show title changed for the length of the strike.
The Daily Show with Jon Stewart	Comedy Central	Reruns began on November 5, 2007.	January 7, 2008 (without writers)	N/A	N/A	The show was briefly renamed A Daily Show with Jon Stewart in honor of the strike.
The Daily Show with Jon Stewart	Comedy Central	Reruns began on November 5, 2007.	February 13, 2008 (with writers)	N/A	N/A	The show was briefly renamed A Daily Show with Jon Stewart in honor of the strike.
The Late Late Show with Craig Ferguson	CBS	Reruns began on November 5, 2007.	New episodes began on January 2, 2008.	N/A	N/A	David Letterman's production company, Worldwide Pants, successfully negotiated a new collective bargaining agreement, so the show returned with its full complement of writing staff.
Late Night with Conan O'Brien	NBC	Reruns began on November 5, 2007.	New episodes began without writers on January 2, 2008.	N/A	N/A	
Late Night with Conan O'Brien	NBC	Reruns began on November 5, 2007.	February 15, 2008 with writers.	N/A	N/A	
Late Show with David Letterman	CBS	Reruns began on November 5, 2007.	New shows began on January 2, 2008.	N/A	N/A	Letterman's production company, Worldwide Pants, successfully negotiated a new collective bargaining agreement, so the show returned with its full complement of writing staff.
Real Time with Bill Maher	HBO	Reruns began on November 9, 2007.	The sixth season premiered without writers on January 11, 2008.	N/A	N/A	
Real Time with Bill Maher	HBO	Reruns began on November 9, 2007.	February 15, 2008 with writers.	N/A	N/A	
Greek	ABC Family	September 10, 2007	March 24, 2008	18 of 22	4	
Saturday Night Live	NBC	Reruns began November 10, 2007.	February 23, 2008.	N/A	N/A	In mid-November, most of the production staff was laid off.
The Tonight Show with Jay Leno	NBC	Reruns began on November 5, 2007.	January 2, 2008 (no writers).	N/A	N/A	
The Tonight Show with Jay Leno	NBC	Reruns began on November 5, 2007.	February 15, 2008 with writers.	N/A	N/A	

=== Shows with shortened seasons ===
Even though production began again on some shows, they were unable to complete the full season originally ordered.

Show	Season	Network	Date stopped	Restart	Episodes made before strike	Episodes made after strike	Notes
30 Rock	2	NBC	January 10, 2008	April 10, 2008	10 of 22	5	The cast performed a live show at the Upright Citizens Brigade theater in New York City which later resulted in the airing of a live broadcast episode entitled "Live Show" in 2010.
Back to You	1	Fox	February 27, 2008	April 16, 2008	9 of 24	5	
The Big Bang Theory	1	CBS	November 12, 2007	March 17, 2008	8 of 22	9	
Bones	3	Fox	December 11, 2007	April 14, 2008	13 of 23	2	
Boston Legal	4	ABC	February 19, 2008	April 8, 2008	14 of 22	6	
Breaking Bad	1	AMC	March 9, 2008	March 8, 2009	7 of 9	0	Hank Schrader (Dean Norris) was planned to be killed off at the end of Season 1, but his character was spared since the episodes weren't written due to the strike. Season 2 premiered on March 8, 2009.
Brothers & Sisters	2	ABC	February 17, 2008	April 20, 2008	12 of 23	4	
Cold Case	5	CBS	February 17, 2008	March 30, 2008	13 of 24	5	
Criminal Minds	3	CBS	January 23, 2008	April 2, 2008	13 of 25	7	
CSI	8	CBS	January 10, 2008	April 3, 2008	11 of 24	6	
CSI: Miami	6	CBS	January 14, 2008	March 24, 2008	13 of 24	8	
CSI: NY	4	CBS	February 6, 2008	April 2, 2008	14 of 24	7	
Desperate Housewives	4	ABC	January 6, 2008	April 13, 2008	10 of 23	7	
Dirt	2	FX			7 of 13	2	
ER	14	NBC	January 17, 2008	April 10, 2008	13 of 22	6	
Family Guy	6	Fox	February 17, 2008	April 27, 2008	9 of 22	3	Show runner Seth MacFarlane said (Lois Kills Stewie) was the last episode produced under his watch and no more new episodes were ready after that. However, Fox completed the three episodes written, voiced and animated for the production cycle without MacFarlane's final approval.
Frank TV	1	TBS	December 18, 2007		5 of 8	0	
Friday Night Lights	2	NBC	February 8, 2008		15 of 22	0	
The Game	2	The CW	February 4, 2008	March 23, 2008	11 of 22	9	
Ghost Whisperer	3	CBS	January 18, 2008	April 4, 2008	12 of 22	6	
Gossip Girl	1	The CW	January 9, 2008	April 21, 2008	13 of 22	5	
Grey's Anatomy	4	ABC	January 10, 2008	April 24, 2008	11 of 23	6	
Heroes	2	NBC	December 3, 2007	September 22, 2008	11 of 24	0	
House	4	Fox	February 5, 2008	April 28, 2008	12 of 24	4	
How I Met Your Mother	3	CBS	December 10, 2007	March 17, 2008	11 of 22	9	
iCarly	1	Nickelodeon	July 25, 2008	September 27, 2008	25 of 40		
King of the Hill	12	Fox			21 of 22		
Las Vegas	5	NBC	February 15, 2008		19 of 22	0	
Law & Order: Special Victims Unit	9	NBC	January 22, 2008	April 15, 2008	14 of 22	5	
Lipstick Jungle	1	NBC	March 20, 2008		7 of 13	0	
Lost	4	ABC	March 20, 2008	April 24, 2008	8 of 16	6	Two episodes lost to the strike added to season 5 and 6 respectively.
Medium	4	NBC			9 of 22	7	
My Name is Earl	3	NBC			13 of 25	9	
NCIS	5	CBS	January 15, 2008	April 8, 2008	11 of 24	7	
The New Adventures of Old Christine	3	CBS	March 17, 2008	March 24, 2008	8 of 13	2	
Nip/Tuck	5	FX			14 of 22		
Numb3rs	4	CBS	January 18, 2008	April 4, 2008	12 of 24	6	
The Office (US)	4	NBC	November 15, 2007	April 10, 2008	8 of 25	6	
One Tree Hill	5	The CW	March 18, 2008	April 14, 2008	12 of 22	6	
Prison Break	3	Fox	February 18, 2008		13 of 22	0	Returned for the fourth season.
Reaper	1	The CW	December 4, 2007	March 13, 2008	13 of 22	5	
The Riches	2	FX			7 of 13	4	
Rules of Engagement	2	CBS	November 19, 2007	April 24, 2008	9 of 22	4	
Samantha Who?	1	ABC	December 10, 2007	April 7, 2008	12 of 22	3	
Scrubs	7	NBC	December 6, 2007	April 10, 2008	11 of 18	2	Two episodes were produced after the strike — as indicated by production codes — that aired as part of the eighth season when the show moved to ABC. One of those two episodes, "My Nah Nah Nah", made use of unused footage from the incomplete twelfth episode of the seventh season that had its filming halted as a result of the strike.
Shark	2	CBS	January 22, 2008	April 29, 2008	12 of 22	4	
The Simpsons	19	Fox			22 of 23		
Smallville	7	The CW	March 27, 2008	April 17, 2008	15 of 22	5	
Supernatural	3	The CW	February 21, 2008	April 24, 2008	12 of 22	4	As a result of the strike, Supernatural's third season was reduced from its usual twenty-two episode count to only sixteen episodes.
'Til Death	1	Fox	November 28, 2007	March 25, 2008	12 of 22	3	
Terminator: The Sarah Connor Chronicles	1	Fox	March 3, 2008	September 8, 2008	9 of 13	0	The second season was announced on April 22, 2008, and premiered on September 8, 2008.
Two and a Half Men	5	CBS	November 26, 2007	March 17, 2008	10 of 24	9	
Ugly Betty	2	ABC	January 24, 2008	April 24, 2008	13 of 23	5	
The Unit	3	CBS	December 18, 2007		11 of 22	0	
Without a Trace	6	CBS	January 17, 2008	April 3, 2008	12 of 24	6	

=== Shows postponed ===
The production on some shows was halted completely, to be restarted, in the 2008–2009 season.

Show	Network	Date stopped	Restart	Episodes made and ordered	Notes
24	Fox	N/A	January 2009.	8 of 24	The seventh season was originally scheduled to air in January 2008, but was delayed until January 2009. FOX announced a two-hour movie, 24: Redemption, that was shown on November 23, 2008, to bridge the year and a half gap between season 6 and season 7.
Battlestar Galactica	Sci Fi	N/A		10 of 21	Only the front half (first ten) were planned to be aired in Spring 2008 season with an indefinite time (now more so) for the back half.
Chuck	NBC	January 24, 2008	Fall of 2008.	13 of 22	The season was cut short.
Damages	FX	October 23, 2007	January 2009.	13 of 13	No episodes were written because the show was renewed the day after the strike began.
Dirty Sexy Money	ABC	December 5, 2007	Fall of 2008	13 of 22	It was renewed for 2008–2009 season with no new episodes set to air until then. The last three episodes were pushed to the beginning of the next season.
Entourage	HBO				Start delayed from June to Sept 2008.
Hannah Montana	Disney Channel				Season two wrapped filming before the strike began, with season three's production delayed until summer.
Jonas	Disney Channel				Originally scheduled for June 2008 under a different concept, the original pilot featured the Jonas Brothers working as spies was filmed before the strike, due to their increasing popularity, the series was retooled after the strike and premiered on May 2, 2009.
Law & Order: Criminal Intent	USA	December 13, 2007	Summer of 2008	10 of 24	Repurposed on NBC during the strike. Originally scheduled for April, second half (12 episodes) delayed until summer.
Life	NBC	December 5, 2007	Fall of 2008.	11 of 22	The season was cut short.
Prison Break: Cherry Hill	Fox	N/A		N/A	No status reports for the spin-off were ever announced, and the project quietly ended before production began.
Private Practice	ABC	December 5, 2007	Fall of 2008	9 of 22	The season was cut short.
Pushing Daisies	ABC	December 12, 2007	Fall of 2008.	9 of 22	The season was cut short.
Rescue Me	FX		July 1, 2008		No episodes were written because the show was renewed the day after the strike began.

=== Shows cancelled during strike ===
Some shows cancelled during the strike were under threat of cancellation anyway. In other cases, shows were cancelled, or had their seasons shortened, because of the financial damage of the strike. Several television shows, including Journeyman, K-Ville, Big Shots, and Cavemen, were "quietly" cancelled, in part due to the writer's strike, and in part due to low ratings.

Show	Network	Unaired Episodes Left	Episodes made and ordered
Men in Trees	ABC	6	19 of 27 ordered episodes were completed (5 left over from Season 1 and 14 from Season 2).
Big Shots	ABC	11 of 13.	First cancelled in December 2007, the series was later announced on the mid-season schedule, but was ultimately cancelled for good on May 13, 2008.
Bionic Woman	NBC	8 of 13	Although rumored to have been cancelled following its eighth episode, media reports suggested that NBC-Universal intended to produce the remaining episodes of the 13-episode order. In March 2008, producer David Eick announced the series had been cancelled.
Cavemen	ABC	7 of 13	Only 6 episodes aired; the show was then cancelled.
Cashmere Mafia	ABC	7 of 13	
Cory in the House	Disney Channel	13	Production on season 2 was suspended shortly after the strike began, series canceled upon completion of the strike.
Girlfriends	The CW	13 of 22	Season 8 was announced as final before strike, no proper final episode to be produced.
Journeyman	NBC	All 13 episodes completed.	The series was not renewed by NBC.
Just Jordan	Nickelodeon	3 of 13	Production suspended, only 3 episodes produced for a planned 3rd season, later aired as a part of season 2, series cancelled upon completion of the strike.
K-Ville	Fox	11 of 13	Production shut down and not present on Fox's spring schedule.
Life is Wild	The CW	13 of 13	Series cancelled after the strike, production was filmed in South Africa so it was not under WGA purview.
Out of Jimmy's Head	Cartoon Network	All 20 episodes completed.	Post-production affected by the strike, Laugh tracks were featured starting with its 8th episode, series cancelled upon completion of the strike.
The Return of Jezebel James	Fox	7 of 13	Due to low ratings, cancelled after 3 episodes
Tell Me You Love Me	HBO	Season one completed before the strike	Although initially renewed for a second season, it was later canceled.
Welcome to The Captain	CBS	6 of 6	Only 5 episodes aired.
Notes From the Underbelly	ABC	N/A	5 episodes (from the first season) were shot, only 10 of the planned 13 new episodes were made. Only 2 of the 10 were shown.
The 4400	USA Network	N/A	Cancelled despite the fourth season's cliff-hanger.

=== Unknown post-strike effects ===
There is still not enough known information about the following shows to categorize the effects on them.

Network	Show	Unaired Episodes Left	Notes
Disney Channel	Wizards of Waverly Place	N/A	Writing halted.
HBO	Big Love	N/A	Writing halted.
HBO	True Blood	N/A	Started airing first season on September 7, 2008.
Lifetime	Army Wives	N/A	Writing halted. The show aired for 7 seasons beginning in 2007.
Lifetime	Blood Ties	N/A	Writing halted.
Lifetime	Cheerleader Nation	N/A	Status is currently unknown.
Lifetime	Side Order of Life	N/A	Writing halted.
Lifetime	State of Mind	N/A	Writing halted.
The N	The Best Years	0	Season one completed its run during the summer. Season 2 aired in 2009.
The N	Beyond the Break	N/A	Season 3 eventually aired in 2009.
Nickelodeon	SpongeBob SquarePants	N/A	Several writers fired. Speed of scripting slowed.
TBS	The Bill Engvall Show	N/A	10 episodes were to be produced, unknown how many were written.
TBS	My Boys	N/A	8 episodes were to be produced, unknown how many were written.

== Strike effect by type of show ==
=== Prime-time series ===
- Mid-season shows, such as Dirt and The Riches, began production after most other TV shows, so they had completed fewer episodes; although some shows were produced early, knowing a strike was possible. 24, also airing mid-season, was postponed due to the serial nature of the show.
- For some shows without full-season pickups such as Moonlight, production on the first batch of shows was completed.
- Scrubs creator Bill Lawrence responded to concerns that a proper series finale may not air, as only 11 of its 18 ordered episodes were filmed at the time. Lawrence stated he would either release the finale on DVD or post what would have happened in episodes 13 through 18 on the internet. However, it was announced in May 2008 that ABC picked up Scrubs for an eighth season for 2008–2009.
- During the strike, ABC's Dirty Sexy Money was given a full season order. NBC also gave full season orders to Life, and Chuck and also announced that, contrary to recurring rumor, Bionic Woman would also continue production after the strike.
- FX Network's The Shield is one of the few shows that was able to air the entire season, as it was mostly wrapped before the strike started. Similarly, CBS's returning series, Jericho, aired midseason. Production of the full season was completed prior to the strike and was not affected by the work stoppage.
- Some networks such as CBS, due to the financial effects of the strike, ordered a reduced number of pilots.
- CBS aired a Canadian series, Flashpoint. NBC similarly aired the Canadian series The Listener, but pulled the show after one episode due to low ratings.

=== Talk shows ===
Late night comedy shows such as The Tonight Show with Jay Leno, Late Night with Conan O'Brien, Jimmy Kimmel Live!, Late Show with David Letterman, The Late Late Show with Craig Ferguson, The Daily Show with Jon Stewart, and Saturday Night Live began airing reruns immediately. Last Call with Carson Daly resumed airing on December 3, with host Carson Daly explaining that if he did not do so, his staff would have been fired. On January 2, 2008, The Tonight Show and Late Night returned on NBC with new episodes. Conan O'Brien stated, "An unwritten version of 'Late Night,' though not desirable, is possible -- and no one has to be fired."

On November 12, 2007, instead of a recent episode, NBC aired an episode of The Tonight Show from November 17, 2003. Beginning the week of November 26, The Tonight Show began continuously airing "vintage" episodes. The Tonight Show was reportedly planning to air new episodes beginning November 19, having guest hosts to fill in for Jay Leno. This did not occur, however.

Several talk show hosts who refused to do their shows announced that they would pay non-striking staff members out of their own pockets through the end of the year, including David Letterman and Conan O'Brien. Jay Leno was chided when NBC fired his non-striking staff, after he promised them they would not have to worry about their jobs. Leno later announced that he would also pay his staff for the next 2 weeks starting December 2, 2007.

David Letterman and his Worldwide Pants, Inc. production company broke ranks with the networks and negotiated its own independent contract with the WGA in late 2007. The deal was independent and only between the production company and the union, and allowed the company to start new shows in 2008.

=== Other ===
Although many animated series employ union writers, there is no requirement to do so. For instance, the writers of South Park, Trey Parker and Matt Stone, were not union members, and the show remained in production during the strike. The episode "Canada on Strike" was written as a parody of the WGA strike.

Movies, such as High School Musical 3: Senior Year, were directly affected by the strike, including those filmed on location. However, the strike did not affect reality shows such as American Idol, whose episodes are unscripted, or news programs, whose writers belong to a different guild. Nevertheless, newswriters at CBS News and at local CBS owned-and-operated television stations (as well as CBS Radio news entities) were subject to the threat of a different strike action by the WGA. CBS News writers under the WGA had been without a contract with the network since April 2005 until a contract was agreed to on January 9, 2008.

Similarly, some game shows, such as Are You Smarter Than a 5th Grader? and The Price Is Right, were not affected because they are unscripted, other than the questions and the prize descriptions (and in Price's case, Showcase skits); by contrast, Sony Pictures' Jeopardy! and Wheel of Fortune, and Disney's Who Wants to Be a Millionaire had their quiz questions researched and written by WGA writers under deals with their producers. The first season of the game show Duel premiered on December 17, 2007, and ended on December 23, 2007; the first season of the show was the only game show, and thus the only strike-replacement program, that was affected by the strike. The second season premiered on April 4, 2008, and ended on July 25, 2008, with an 8-week break between May 2 and June 27. A revival of American Gladiators was launched sooner than originally scheduled, with taping in November 2007 that aired in January 2008. Other game, contest and reality shows launched sooner than originally scheduled in order to minimize the amount of scripted-program reruns, and CBS commissioned an order of six episodes of The Price Is Right $1,000,000 Spectacular, the first in the primetime series with new host Drew Carey (who took over hosting duties that season), which later resulted in four additional episodes later in the season. This resulted in drastic mid-season set changes that allowed the show to switch to high-definition television, initially with these episodes, and the daytime show switched for the start of the next season.

While the strike had no effect on sporting events (which are unscripted), the strike also did not affect scripted professional wrestling, as both World Wrestling Entertainment (WWE) and Total Nonstop Action Wrestling had in-house ununionized writers. WWE, which had a contract with NBC Universal and aired the biennial Saturday Night's Main Event on the parent network, offered up additional wrestling shows for NBC if needed.

Nightline was the only late-night network program to benefit in the Nielsen ratings from the writers strike. As well, many ABC, and some Fox, affiliates won their late news timeslots as a result of the strike, with most ending winning streaks of the local CBS or NBC affiliates. Among these ABC and Fox affiliates were KABC-TV in Los Angeles, WCVB in Boston, WFAA in Dallas, WTTG in Washington, KSTU in Salt Lake City, KMSP in Minneapolis, KTVI in St. Louis, KOMO-TV in Seattle and WXYZ-TV in Detroit.

== See also ==
- List of Hollywood strikes
  - 1960 Writers Guild of America strike
  - 1981 Writers Guild of America strike
  - 1988 Writers Guild of America strike
  - 2023 Writers Guild of America strike
- Impact of the COVID-19 pandemic on television in the United States
- Alliance of Motion Picture and Television Producers
- Writers Guild of America, East (WGAE)
- Writers Guild of America, west (WGAW)
- ABS-CBN franchise renewal controversy
- Who Made Huckabee?
