= Writers Guild of America =

US TV and film writer labor unions

Writers Guild of America East logo

Writers Guild of America West logo

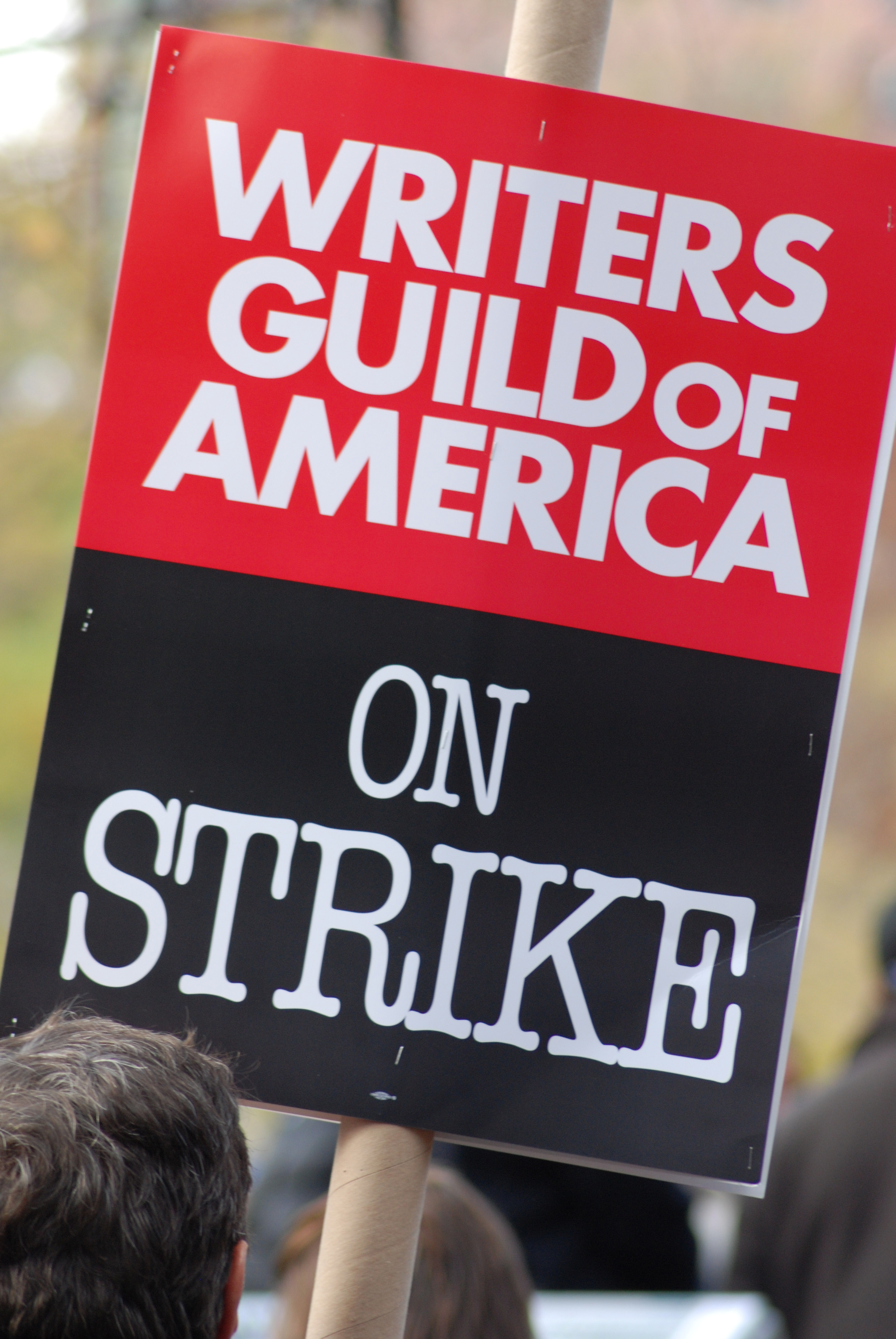
A Writers Guild of America strike sign, 2007

The Writers Guild of America (WGA) are two independent American sister labor unions, each representing writers in film, television, radio, and online media:

- The Writers Guild of America East (WGAE) is headquartered in New York City and is affiliated with the AFL-CIO national trade union center
- The Writers Guild of America West (WGAW) is headquartered in Los Angeles and is unaffiliated with any larger national trade union.

While both organizations operate independently, each performs some common activities, including negotiating contracts, launching strike actions, maintaining the American database of writing credits, and arbitrating between writers when conflicts arise. Generally, writers initially join the East Guild if they are east of the Mississippi River, and those west of the river first join the West Guild. Members are not required to transfer between the two organizations if they relocate across the river.

== History ==
=== Background and founding ===
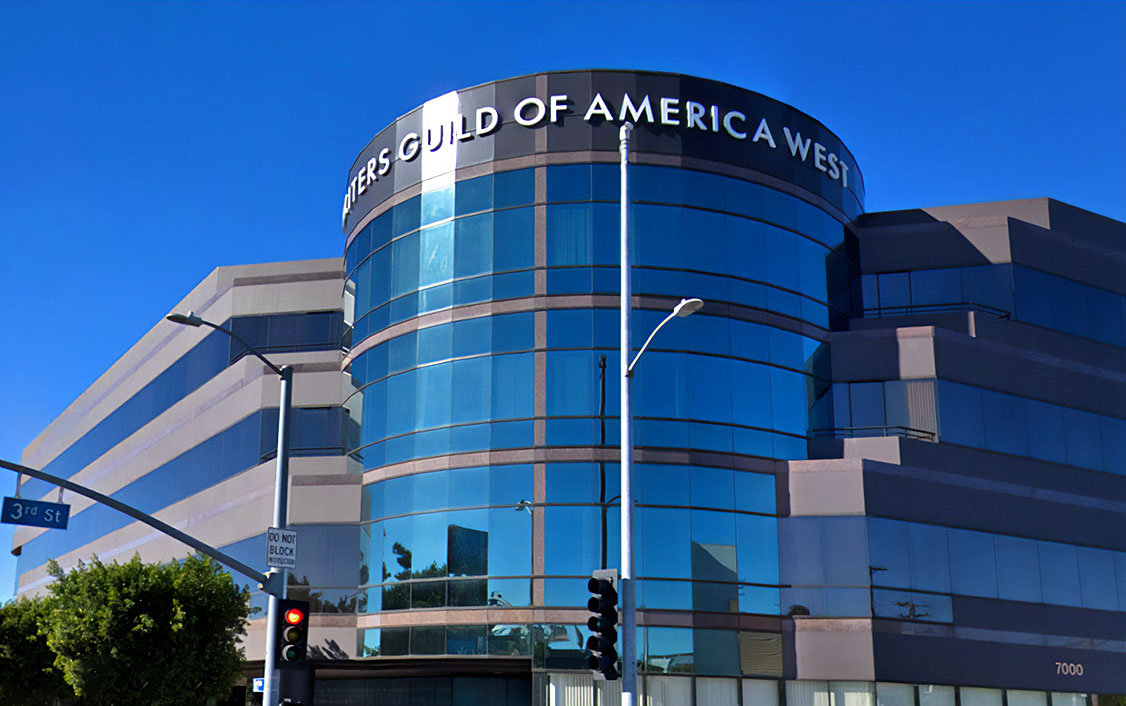
The Los Angeles headquarters of the Writers Guild of America West at 3rd & Fairfax.

Both organizations of the Writers Guild of America were established by 1954 after the merging of groups from other writers labor unions. The Authors Guild (AG) was originally founded in 1912 as the Authors' League of America (ALA) to represent book and magazine authors, as well as dramatists. In 1921, the Dramatists Guild of America split off as a separate group to represent writers of stage and, later, radio drama. That same year, the Screen Writers Guild (SWG) was formed to represent film screenwriters, but operated primarily more as a social organization until 1933 when the group affiliated with the AG and took on a more active role in labor negotiations. With the emergence of the television industry by 1948, the SWG and a Television Writers Group within the AG began to represent TV writers. In recognition of the growing complexity of representing members in many different fields of entertainment writing, the unions reorganized in 1954. Both the Authors Guild and the Dramatists Guild would continue to represent writers in print media, the SWG would fold, and those working in motion pictures, TV, and radio would be represented by two new guilds, headquartered on both coasts: the WGAE and the WGAW.

=== 21st century ===
East and West Guild leaders approved a tentative four-year contract with studios and streamers on April 4, 2026, with a ratification vote by members to ensue by April 24.

== East and West Guilds ==
Membership in either WGAE or WGAW is generally contingent on geography. If a writer is eligible for union membership, and the job that grants them eligibility has them work on the western side of the Mississippi River, they are represented by the Writers Guild of America West. If the job is on the east side of the river, similarly, they are represented by the Writers Guild of America East. If a writer joins one union at the start of their career, and they move across the Mississippi River, they are not required to transfer to the other guild. They must remain in good standing (pay all outstanding dues, pay off any loans taken out, etc.) with their original guild, and requesting a transfer between the unions is then optional.

WGAW is the larger of the two unions, both in membership and support staff, and this is due to the history of film and television in the United States. At the time of the dissolution of the Screen Writers Guild in 1954, most television and film writing was done in Los Angeles. While this is still largely true, the Californian film industry has begun to shrink in recent years due to the collapse of the streaming business model, and the rising cost-of-living in California. Writers have been forced to either leave the industry or move to areas outside of Los Angeles they can afford. Some of these new production hubs, like Albuquerque, New Mexico, are still within the jurisdiction of the Writers Guild of America West, but the growing production hubs like Chicago, Atlanta, and New Orleans are all under the jurisdiction of the Writers Guild of America East.

== Common activities ==
Although the WGAE and the WGAW run independently of each other, they jointly perform some regular activities, including the following:

- The Writers Guild of America Awards are presented annually by both guilds in recognition of excellence in film, television, and radio writing, including both fiction and non-fiction. The 1st Writers Guild of America Awards were held in 1949 to honor the best film writers of 1948. The annual awards show includes simultaneous presentations on both coasts.
- The WGA screenwriting credit system is used to determine who receives credit for writing a film, television, theatrical, or other media work written under the WGA's jurisdiction. The guilds are the final arbiters on who and how writers are listed in the credits. The credit a writer receives is directly tied to their percentage of initial compensation and residuals for that project.
- The WGA script registration service is run by both guilds to establish the date of creation of literary property.
- Both guilds are members of the International Affiliation of Writers Guilds.

== Strikes ==
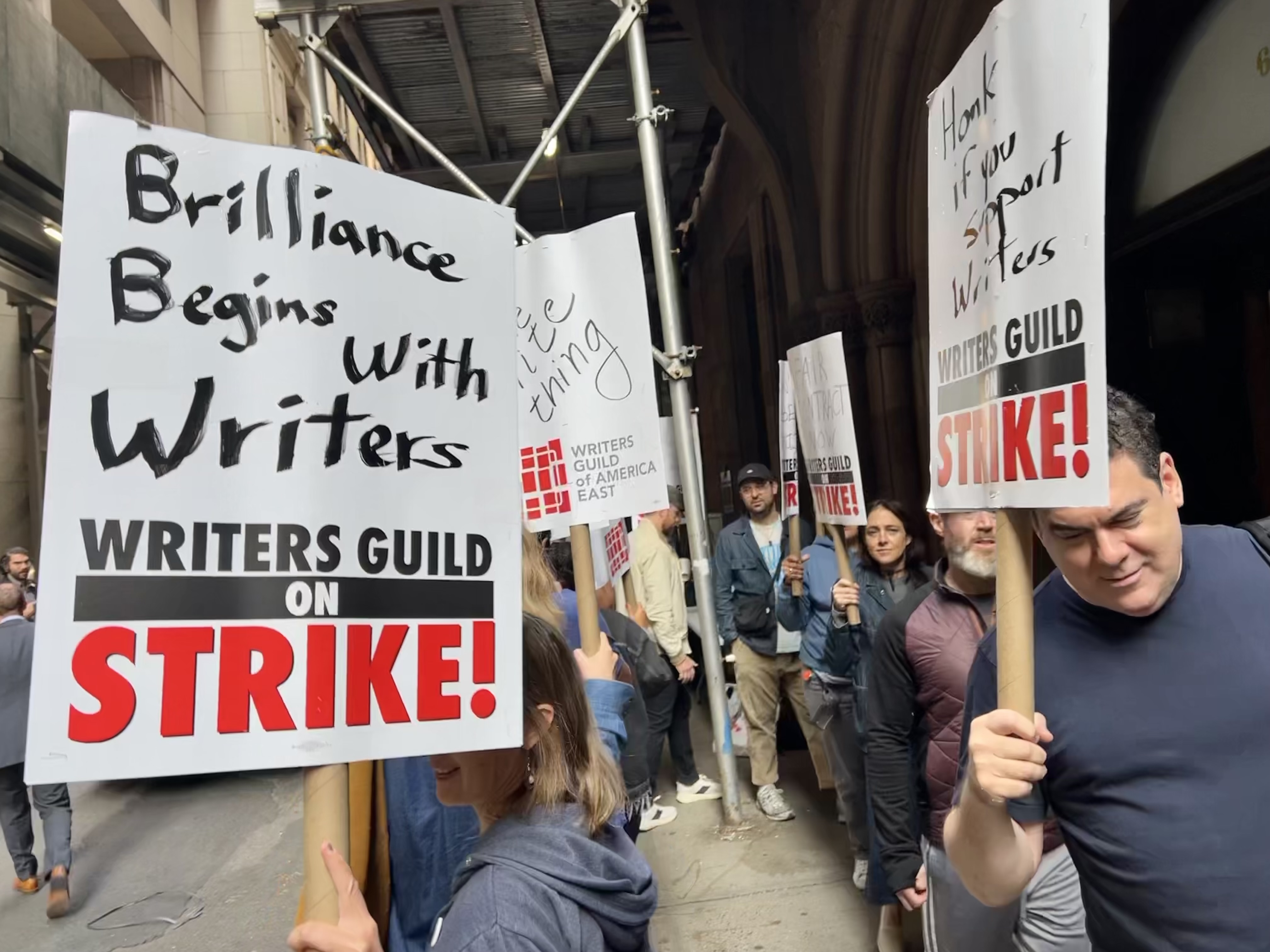
Picket line formed by writers that are on strike in New York City. Outside on location of the Marvel Studios Disney+ TV show, Daredevil: Born Again (working title Out the Kitchen), 2023.

The WGAE and WGAW negotiate contracts in unison as well as launch strike actions simultaneously.

- The 1960 Writers Guild of America strike lasted for 22 weeks. The negotiated contract included the first residuals for theatrical films, and the improved pensions.
- The 1981 Writers Guild of America strike lasted for 13 weeks. The negotiated contract included establishing payment terms for "pay TV" cable programs.
- The 1985 Writers Guild of America strike lasted two weeks. At dispute was the formula for paying home video residuals.
- The 1988 Writers Guild of America strike lasted from March 7 to August 7, 1988. Among the disputes were residuals from syndicated reruns of hour-long shows.
- The 2007–08 Writers Guild of America strike lasted from November 5, 2007, to February 12, 2008. Among the disputes were residuals from content made for new media and programs on DVD. The production of several television shows were affected by the strike.
- The 2023 Writers Guild of America strike lasted from May 2 to September 27, 2023. Among the disputes were residuals from the use of AI and streaming media. Many productions were impacted by the strike.

== See also ==
- National Writers Union
