= Head writer =

Person who oversees the team of writers on a television or radio series

A head writer is a person who oversees the team of writers on a television or radio series. The title is common in the soap opera genre, as well as with sketch comedies and talk shows that feature monologues and comedy skits. In fictional comedy or drama TV shows, this is generally performed by an executive producer, who is usually also the showrunner.

== Overview ==
The head writer conceives and outlines the long-term story of a scripted television or radio series.

In daytime television, the over-arcing storylines are broken out into daily episodes, which are individually outlined by particular writers, and fleshed out with dialogue by others.

In prime-time series, individual staff or freelance writers briefed with any long-term storylines generally pitch their episode ideas to the head writer/executive producer. The writer develops their ideas into an outline and a script, which is subsequently edited and revised by the series' entire writing team during the production process.

Sometimes head writers also hold the role of story editor, though at other times the roles are separate.

In Japanese animation, the role that is given to a writer who leads a team of individual episode scriptwriters (脚本, kyakuhon) is credited as series composition (シリーズ構成, shirīzu kōsei).

== Writing awards ==
There are several awards for which a head writer can be eligible. They include:

- Daytime Emmy Award (Daytime Emmy Award for Outstanding Drama Series Writing Team)
- Primetime Emmy Award (Outstanding Writing for a Comedy Series, Outstanding Writing for a Drama Series, Outstanding Writing for a Limited Series, Movie, or Dramatic Special, Outstanding Writing for a Variety Series)
- Writers Guild of America Awards
- Gemini Awards
- Satellite Awards
- Golden Globe Award (Golden Globe Award for Best Screenplay)
- British Academy Television Awards
- TCA Awards

== Membership ==
Head writers may be members of the following groups: WGA, Writers Guild of Canada, Authors Guild, Dramatists Guild of America, American Screenwriters Association, Australian Writers' Guild, and International Affiliation of Writers Guilds.

== See also ==
- Executive producer
- Television crew
- Showrunner
