= Spec script =

Script written without prior request

A spec script, also known as a speculative screenplay, is a non-commissioned and unsolicited screenplay. It is usually written by a screenwriter who hopes to have the script optioned and eventually purchased by a producer, production company, or studio.

Spec scripts which have gone on to win Academy Awards include Thelma & Louise (sold by Callie Khouri to Metro-Goldwyn-Mayer for US$500,000 in 1990), Good Will Hunting (sold by Matt Damon and Ben Affleck to Miramax for US$675,000 in 1994), and American Beauty (sold by Alan Ball to DreamWorks Pictures for US$250,000 in 1998), which all won the Academy Award for Best Original Screenplay.

A spec script reads differently from a shooting script or production script in that it focuses more on the storytelling itself, while focus on cinematography and other directing aspects should rarely, if ever, be used. Videographic and technical directions are often added in the later drafts. The sole purpose of a spec script, also called a selling script, is to showcase a screenwriter's talent of telling a story through action and dialogue.

Spec scripts are often written by unknown screenwriters looking to prove their storytelling ability and make a name for themselves in the film industry.

== History ==
In 1933, Preston Sturges is believed to have sold the first spec script in Hollywood history. Fox bought The Power and the Glory for US$17,500 plus back-end revenue. The movie did poorly at the box office. However, in 2014 the film was selected for preservation in the National Film Registry.

Spec scripts have not always held as much cachet in the business as they do now. Ernest Lehman describes how his original script for the 1959 film North by Northwest was unusual at that point in his career:

Originals were not smiled upon in those days, believe it or not. There was very little interest in originals in those days. [...] Studios, distributors wanted the assurance of someone else having thought a property worth publishing [...] In those days, if you went to a party in the Hollywood community and somebody would ask, "What are you working on, Ernie?" and you replied, "I'm doing an original now," the response would be "Oh." [...] Like they were a little embarrassed [...] If you were working on something that you were going to create all by yourself, they'd secretly think, "He's in bad shape. Working on an original." That definitely was the climate at one time in this town.

In the late 1960s, William Goldman sold his spec script Butch Cassidy and the Sundance Kid to 20th Century Fox for US$400,000 in a studio bidding war. The script went on to win the Academy Award for Best Original Screenplay. This event precipitated a rise in screenwriters writing on spec.

== Attracting producers ==
If the writer of a spec script has an agent, the agent will identify a number of prospective buyers who may range from small independent producers to executives working in the major studios, and attempt to build up "heat" under the script. The script may be sent out simultaneously to all the prospective buyers in the hope of attracting a bidding war.

If the script sells, the writer may receive a payment of anything from a few tens of thousands of dollars to several million. The script may then be developed even further until it is "greenlit" – meaning it goes into production. If not, the script is sometimes dead in the water because it is now in the databases of the studios and development executives, and has been marked as having been "passed" on. There is the chance, however, a film that has not been greenlit could make The Black List – "a list of the ten best unproduced specs."

If a spec script is not picked up, but the writing is good, the screenwriter may be offered a writing assignment. This could be a "development deal" – where a studio or producer asks a screenwriter to write another original script or adapt an idea or book into a screenplay.

Outside of the traditional route of finding an agent, there are a number of competitions that a screenwriter can enter, such as the Nicholl Fellowship or Final Draft's Big Break Contest, among others. Another way a screenwriter could attract a producer is by paying a small fee and posting their screenplay on an "online posting." When using this service, a screenwriter posts their screenplay and after receiving feedback, if the screenplay is good, it will be posted to the service's main web site.

== See also ==
- Screenwriter's salary
- Shooting script
- Storyboard
- WGA script registration service
- Dreams on Spec, a 2007 documentary on screenwriting
