= WGA screenwriting credit system =

Credit system for motion pictures and television programs in the United States

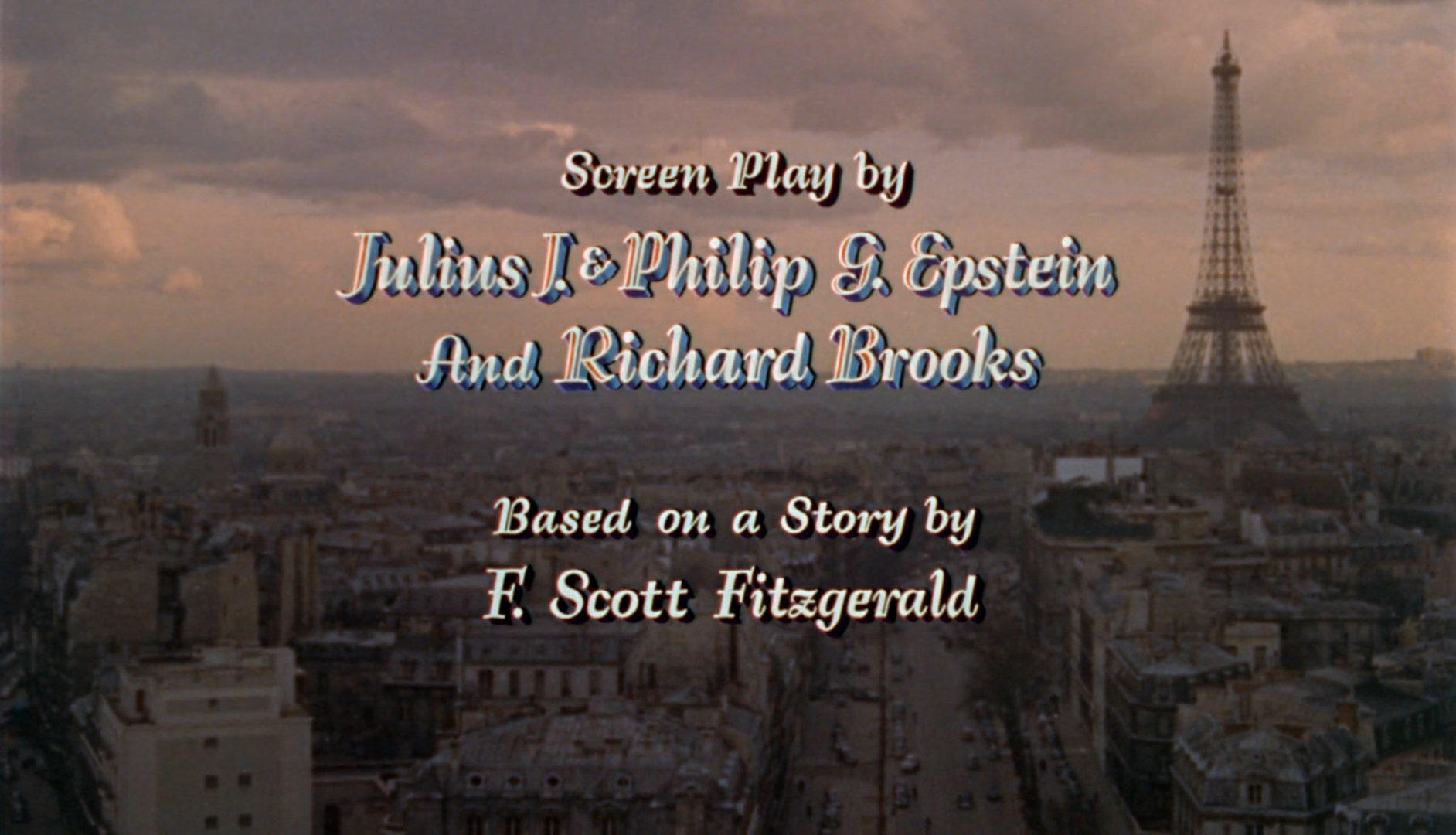
Writing credits for The Last Time I Saw Paris. The ampersand joins Julius J. and Philip G. Epstein as a writing team; "and" separates Richard Brooks, who worked independently.

The Writers Guild of America (WGA) screenwriting credit system determines the official writing credits for theatrical films, television programs, and streaming productions made under WGA jurisdiction. It is jointly administered by the Writers Guild of America, East (WGAE) and the Writers Guild of America West (WGAW). The Guild's Credits Department determines final credits, conducts arbitrations, and helps enforce the credit provisions of the Minimum Basic Agreement (MBA). The WGA and its predecessor, the Screen Writers Guild, have been the final arbiters of writing credits under their contracts since the 1940s.

The rules distinguish writing teams from writers who work separately and define credits such as "Written by", "Story by", "Screenplay by", and "Teleplay by". For theatrical films, contribution thresholds vary according to whether a screenplay is original, whether the writer is the first or a subsequent writer, and whether the writer is also a production executive. Dramatic television uses no numerical thresholds; credits are based on contributions to dramatic construction, scenes, characterization or character relationships, and dialogue.

The credit process begins with a production company's proposed credits. A participating writer may leave them unchallenged, ask the Guild to arrange a discussion among the writers, or file a protest, which usually triggers arbitration. Writing credits can affect a writer's compensation, residuals, professional reputation, and prospects for future work. Writers and filmmakers have long criticized some arbitration decisions.

== Background ==
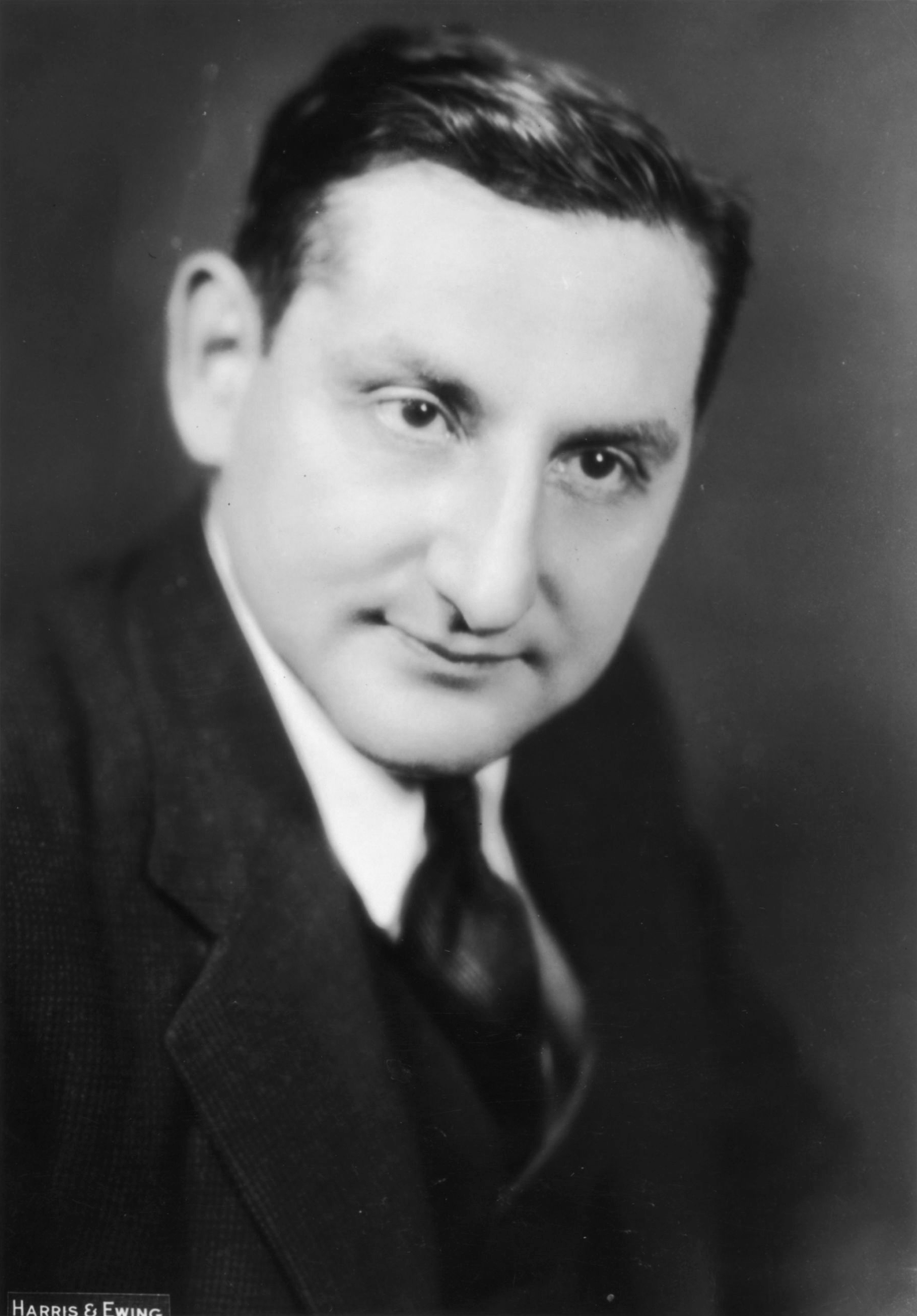
John Howard Lawson, the first president of the Screen Writers Guild.

=== Rationale ===
Writing credits affect a writer's professional reputation, compensation, residuals, and prospects for future work. John Howard Lawson, the first president of the Screen Writers Guild (SWG), described a writer's name as their "most cherished possession" and the symbol of their creative identity. A production may involve more writers than eventually receive screen credit, while those credited may qualify for bonuses and residuals tied to credit.

On the 1994 film The Flintstones, thirty-two writers took part in round-table brainstorming as the story passed through successive drafts, a method then common in television comedy but less common in films. The final writing credit named only three people: Tom S. Parker and Jim Jennewein as a team, and Steven E. de Souza.

Work covered by WGA contracts can also count toward eligibility for union membership. Under the WGAW Constitution, an applicant may qualify for Current membership by earning 24 units in the preceding three years through covered employment, sales, or options with a signatory company; different kinds of literary material and services earn different numbers of units. The MBA is the collective agreement between the WGA and signatory studios and production companies. It establishes minimum compensation, residuals, benefits, working conditions, and credit rules; the current agreement runs from May 2, 2026, through May 1, 2030.

=== Screen Writers Guild credit system ===
Although the SWG reorganized as a labor union in 1933, the early film industry resisted writers' efforts to unionize. During the 1930s, studios controlled writing credits. Losing a credit could make it harder for a writer to find another job or secure a raise, while studios sometimes credited producers, writers with marquee value, or friends and relatives of studio chiefs who had not worked on the script. Fair attribution therefore became one of the SWG's central bargaining demands. In 1938, the National Labor Relations Board held that screenwriters were employees covered by federal labor law, and the Guild won the ensuing representation election. Producers recognized it as the writers' bargaining representative in 1939.

The Guild and the studios reached their first negotiated contract in 1941 and signed it in 1942. The agreement guaranteed writer control of screen credits through the Guild, written contracts, dispute arbitration, and minimum compensation. It replaced a system in which producers made the final decision with one in which a company proposed credits and Guild writers arbitrated disputes. The agreement chiefly covered lower-paid writers, and compulsory collaboration and writing by committee continued to make credit contentious; prominent, highly paid writers could more often insist on working alone.

The Screen Credits Manual has used a 33 percent contribution standard since 1948, and the 1953 television agreement put television credits under Guild control. The SWG then merged with unions representing radio and television writers to form the WGAE and WGAW in 1954; the screen and television contracts were combined into one MBA in 1970. In 1980, the theatrical rules gave the first writer of an original screenplay added protection by requiring a subsequent writer to contribute more than half of the final script, while guaranteeing the original writer at least shared story credit. The Guild has remained the final arbiter of writing credits under its contracts since the 1940s.

=== Blacklist and credit restoration ===
During the Hollywood blacklist, writers who could no longer work under their own names sometimes used pseudonyms or fronts, people whose names appeared in their place, while others lost screen credit altogether. The Guild initially challenged the studios' power to deny credit, but in 1953 it accepted an MBA clause allowing producers to withhold it from Communist Party members and writers who refused to answer legislative questions about Communist affiliations. Guild panels continued to determine what credit a blacklisted writer had earned even when the studio would not put that name on screen.

Friendly Persuasion was one such case. Allied Artists proposed screenplay credit for Jessamyn West and Robert Wyler, but after Michael Wilson protested, a 1956 Guild arbitration awarded him sole screenplay credit and treated West's book as source material. Wilson had refused to answer questions from the House Un-American Activities Committee and was blacklisted, so the studio invoked the MBA clause and released the film without a screenplay or adaptation credit. In 1986, the WGA began reviewing blacklist-era credits. Its committee used documents and first-hand evidence to identify writers hidden by pseudonyms or fronts. The Guild's list records Wilson's restored credit for Friendly Persuasion in July 1996.

== Credits process ==
For purposes of the credit system, the WGAE and WGAW are jointly referred to as the Guild. Its Credits Department determines final credits, conducts arbitrations, and helps enforce the MBA's credit provisions. The Screen Credits Manual applies to theatrical motion pictures, while the Television Credits Manual applies to non-theatrical motion pictures, including programs made for streaming services.

A company must tell each assigned writer who else is or has been employed on the same material. Writers, in turn, must learn the names of any simultaneous writers and notify them of their own assignment, file their employment contracts with the Guild, and retain dated, labeled copies of literary material submitted to the company. Television uses the same basic obligations and requires written notice of subsequent writers on television motion pictures of at least 90 minutes.

After principal photography, the company sends the Guild and each participating writer a Notice of Tentative Writing Credits and the final shooting script, or the latest revised script if a final script is unavailable. Participating writers include writers employed on the story or script, qualifying professional writers whose literary material was sold or licensed, and, for a remake, writers credited on an earlier produced version. Television follows the same process.

A writer who agrees with the tentative credits need not respond. After reading the final script, a writer may instead ask the Guild to facilitate discussion or file a protest. Before arbitration, all participating writers may unanimously agree who should receive credit and in what permitted form; the company may not suggest or direct that agreement. If no agreement is reached, the Guild determines the credits through arbitration, and it may itself protest a company's proposal even if no writer does.

The manuals distinguish "literary material" — including stories, treatments, screenplays, teleplays, dialogue, and outlines — from "source material" on which a story or script is based. Previously published or exploited works and material written outside Guild jurisdiction can be source material; prior participating writers' work and research material are not. Source credits may identify the relationship to the finished work with wording such as "From a Novel by", "Based upon a Story by", or "Based upon a Screenplay by". Under generative artificial intelligence provisions adopted in 2023 and preserved in the 2026 MBA, artificial intelligence is not a writer, and its output is not literary material. Previously unpublished and unexploited AI-generated material furnished to a writer is not treated as source material when determining credit and cannot disqualify the writer from separated rights.

== Credit forms ==
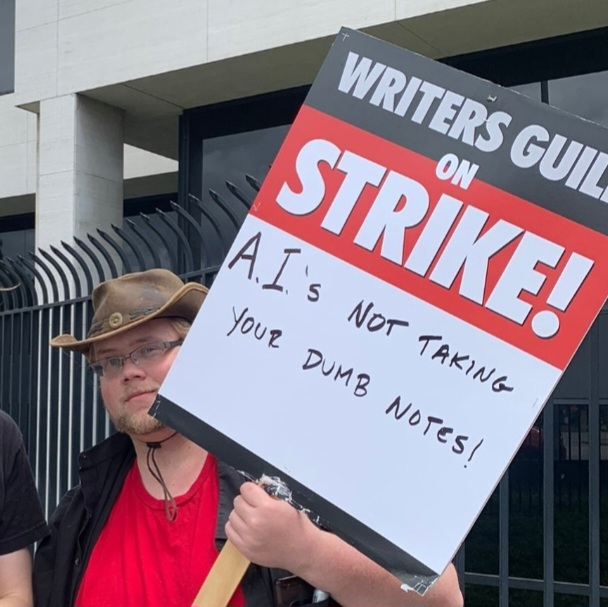
David James Henry carries a sign opposing AI replacement of writers during the 2023 WGA strike.

=== Teams ===
For theatrical films, a writing team consists of two or more writers who collaborate on a particular piece of literary material; a team of more than three requires a Guild waiver. For television, a team is ordinarily two writers assigned at about the same time who work together on the same material for approximately the same period. For credit purposes, a team counts as one writer. An ampersand joins team members' names, while "and" separates writers who worked independently, usually in sequence.

=== Written by ===
"Written by" is used when the same writer or writers are entitled to both story and screenplay or teleplay credit. It is generally unavailable when the script is based on source material of a story nature, although factual sources do not necessarily preclude it. The credit is normally limited to two writers; in unusual cases, and only through arbitration, three writers or writing teams may share it.

=== Screenplay by and Teleplay by ===
"Screenplay by" is appropriate when there is source material of a story nature or when the writers entitled to story and screenplay credit differ. A screenplay credit is normally shared by no more than two writers; arbitration may, in an unusual case, award it to three individual writers or three writing teams. For an original theatrical screenplay, the first writer receives screenplay credit when their contribution is more than 33 percent of the final shooting script. A subsequent non-production-executive writer or team must contribute 50 percent; a subsequent production executive or team that includes one must contribute more than 50 percent. For a non-original screenplay, any writer must contribute more than 33 percent. These proportions are not calculated by counting lines or pages. Arbiters assess dramatic construction, original and different scenes, characterization or character relationships, and dialogue, weighing their effect on the screenplay as a whole.

The television counterpart is "Teleplay by", but dramatic television uses no numerical thresholds. The first writer is entitled to at least shared teleplay credit unless a later writer essentially eliminates the first writer's contribution in all four teleplay elements. A later writer may share credit by contributing substantially more than the first writer to one or more of those elements.

=== Story credits ===
The MBA defines story as writing distinct from the screenplay or teleplay that supplies the basic narrative, idea, theme, or outline of character development and action. "Story by" may be awarded for a covered story written under employment, purchased from a professional writer by a signatory, or written as a sequel story under Guild jurisdiction. It may be shared by no more than two writers. "Screen Story by" or "Television Story by" applies when a writer uses only a limited element of source material — such as a character or incident — and creates a substantially new and different story. These credits can be awarded only through arbitration and may be shared by no more than two writers.

=== Separated rights ===
In television, the writer of a series format, or a writer credited for the story or the story and teleplay from which a series derives, may qualify for separated rights. The writer or writers awarded those rights receive "Created by" credit on each episode and specified sequel payments.

"Developed by" is not automatic and carries no MBA benefits. On an episodic series with separated rights, the company must propose it and the Guild determines its appropriateness through automatic arbitration. On a series without separated rights, continuing credits are contractual rather than Guild-awarded.

=== Other forms ===
Other approved forms include "Narration Written by", "Adaptation by", and "Based on Characters Created by". "Adaptation by" is reserved for unusual cases in which a writer shaped the screenplay or teleplay without qualifying for the corresponding script credit, and it can be awarded only in arbitration. Since January 1, 2022, a participating theatrical writer who does not receive a traditional authorship credit may be offered an "Additional Literary Material" (ALM) credit. A writer may decline it or use a pseudonym. The credit acknowledges covered writing services but is not an authorship credit, does not alter the traditional credit determination, and carries no residuals.

=== Structure and exceptions ===
In a shared credit, the most substantial contributor generally receives first position. If the arbiters find equal contributions or cannot agree on order, writers are listed chronologically.

Writers meeting the Guild's eligibility rules may request a registered pseudonym. Except for the sole participating writer on a project, a participating writer may seek, before arbitration, to withdraw from credit for personal cause, such as a violation of the writer's principles or mutilation of their material. If the other writers disagree, arbiters decide whether personal cause exists. Withdrawal forfeits rights flowing from the credit, whereas use of a pseudonym does not.

== Arbitration ==
"[O]ur writing credits should be a true and accurate statement of authorship as determined by the rules and procedures."

— WGA Screen Credits Manual

For credit purposes, the theatrical rules classify anyone credited as a producer or director as a production executive; the television rules also include story editors, story supervisors, and others who represent management in dealings with writers. Production executives are subject to additional rules. Arbitration is automatic when a production executive is proposed for writing credit and another participating writer is not a production executive. It is also automatic when three writers are proposed for "Written by" or screenplay or teleplay credit, or when a company proposes a screen or television story or adaptation credit. Television requires automatic arbitration for a proposed "Developed by" credit on a series with separated rights.

Three Guild members with no interest in the outcome decide each case. Participating writers receive the relevant arbiters list and may strike a reasonable number of names before the panel is chosen. The Guild keeps the arbiters' identities confidential, including from one another.

The company supplies the literary and source material, and each participant may choose which of their own verified drafts to submit. The last writer is generally represented by the final shooting script. If the finished work diverges from that script, a theatrical writer can request a cutting continuity and a television writer can request an "as broadcast" script. Disputes over the material's authenticity, classification, sequence, authorship, or completeness are resolved before the credit arbitration.

Writers may submit confidential statements explaining how their work meets the manual's credit criteria, but arbiters decide authorship from literary and source material. Statements cannot identify the writer or include contingent-compensation claims, outside endorsements, or irrelevant development history.

Each arbiter reads the material independently. If the three do not initially agree, they confer anonymously with a Credits Committee consultant; if they still cannot reach unanimity, the majority decides. A participating writer may ask an internal Policy Review Board to examine serious procedural or policy deviations, but the board does not reweigh the writers' contributions. It may affirm the result, return it to the original panel, or order a new panel.

Courts can review whether the Guild materially departed from its procedures, but they generally uphold the result rather than reconsider the writers' relative contributions. In Ferguson v. Writers Guild of America, West, Inc., screenwriter Larry Ferguson sought sole screenplay and story credit for Beverly Hills Cop II. The California Court of Appeal declined to compare the scripts itself, found no material and prejudicial departure from the Credits Manual, and affirmed the judgment for the Guild.

Between 1993 and 1997, arbitration decided the writing credits on 415 films, more than one third of those submitted for credit determination. Critics have focused in part on adaptations. Journalist Michele Willens reported that a first adapter may create the cinematic structure, while later writers can draw independently from the same underlying work. This can make it difficult to distinguish inherited source material from a prior writer's contribution.

== Notable conflicts ==
Writer-director Phil Alden Robinson said that "no one can trust the writing credit" because "nobody knows who really wrote the film".

When Hunter S. Thompson's Fear and Loathing in Las Vegas was adapted for film, Alex Cox and Tod Davies wrote the initial adaptation before director Terry Gilliam and Tony Grisoni rewrote it. The WGA initially denied Gilliam and Grisoni credit, although Gilliam maintained that none of the earlier adaptation remained. The Guild later credited all four writers; Gilliam resigned over the dispute and compared the process to a Star Chamber.

A similar dispute arose over Ronin. Director John Frankenheimer said the film should have been credited "Story by J. D. Zeik, screenplay by David Mamet" and asserted that the production used none of Zeik's script. The final credit instead named Zeik and "Richard Weisz", Mamet's pseudonym. Following his earlier dispute over Wag the Dog, Mamet reportedly decided to use his name only on films for which he was the sole writer.

A 2–1 arbitration decision denying George Clooney a writing credit for Leatherheads led him to become a financial core member of the WGA rather than an active member. Variety reported that Clooney said he had overhauled nearly the entire script, while the Guild credited Duncan Brantley and Rick Reilly, who originated the project.

== See also ==
- Billing (filmmaking)
- Credits
- WGA script registration service
- Writers Guild of America Award
