= Writers Guild of America East =

Labor union formed in 1951

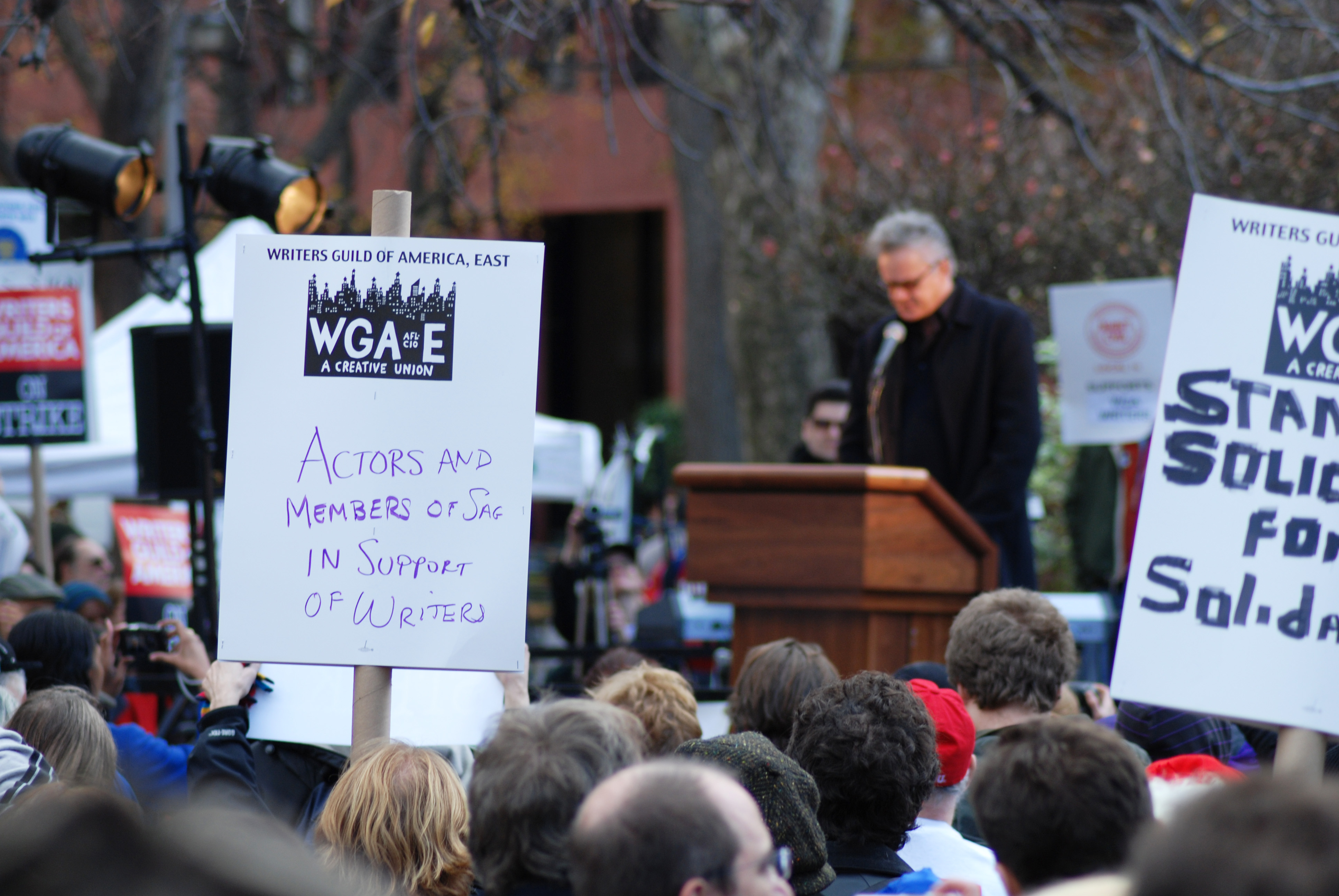
- Solidarity rally in Washington Square, 2007
- Abbreviation: WGA East; WGAE
- Predecessor: Screen Writers Guild
- Founded: 1951
- Headquarters: 250 Hudson Street, New York City, U.S.
- Location: United States
- Members: 7,398 (2026)
- President: Lisa Takeuchi Cullen
- Vice President: Erica Saleh
- Affiliations: AFL–CIO; IAWG; WGA
- Website: www.wgaeast.org

The Writers Guild of America East (WGA East or WGAE) is a labor union representing writers in film, television, radio, news, and online media.

The WGAE and the Writers Guild of America West (WGAW), though independent entities, jointly brand themselves together as the Writers Guild of America (WGA), and cooperate on activities such as launching coordinated strike actions, and administering both the Writers Guild of America Awards and the WGA screenwriting credit system. Generally, members initially join the East Guild if they are east of the Mississippi River, and are not required to transfer between the two organizations if they relocate across the river.

The WGAE is an affiliate of the AFL–CIO and the International Affiliation of Writers Guilds.

== History ==
Membership (US records)
View source data.
Finances (US records; ×$1000)
View source data.

WGAE had its beginnings in 1912, when the Authors' League of America (ALA) was formed by some 350 book and magazine authors, as well as dramatists. In 1921, this group split into two branches of the League: the Dramatists Guild of America for writers of stage and, later, radio drama and the Authors Guild (AG) for novelists and nonfiction book and magazine authors.

That same year, the Screen Writers Guild came into existence in Hollywood, California, but was "little more than a social organization", according to the WGAE's website, until the Great Depression of the 1930s and the growth of the organized labor movement impelled it to take a more active role in negotiating and guaranteeing writers' contractual rights and protections.

In 1933, the AG and SWG joined forces, and two years later, with passage of the National Labor Relations Act of 1935, called for an election to represent writers of films in collective bargaining agreements; the first such agreement was signed in 1942. Meanwhile, the Radio Writers Guild was formed in New York and became part of the ALA.

A Television Writers Group within the AG and a separate group, the Television Writers of America, each began representing writers for the nascent television industry beginning in the late 1940s. In 1951, the AG reorganized into the Writers Guild of America East and West, in recognition of the growing complexity of representing members in many different fields of entertainment writing. Writers working in motion pictures, TV and radio would be represented by these two new guilds, while the Authors Guild and the Dramatists Guild continued to represent print-media writers. The WGAW and WGAE have bargained for writers in movies, TV and radio since 1954.

The conservative anti-communist faction of WGAW and WGAE, initially collaborated with the Hollywood movie studio/network heads and the U.S. government when they drove most writers (who originally formed the Screen Writers Guild and the Writers Guild East unions) out of the domestic entertainment industry during the McCarthy Era.

The WGAE became affiliated with the AFL-CIO in 1989, although its sister group WGAW did not join and has not since.

=== 2007–2008 strike ===
On November 5, 2007, both branches of the guild, East and West, called a strike against all television networks and cable channels over writers' share of revenues from DVD releases, Internet, cell-phone network, and other new-media uses of programs and films written by members. The strike vote followed the expiration of the guild's then-current contract with the Alliance of Motion Picture and Television Producers. The strike ceased on February 12, 2008.

=== Packaging deal ban ===
In early-2019, ahead of the expiration of its franchise agreements with the Association of Talent Agents (ATA) on April 6, the WGA announced an intent to enforce a new Code of Conduct prohibiting talent agents from holding any financial stake in the producer of a work written by its members or deriving "any revenue or other benefit from a Writer's involvement in or employment" in a covered work, besides a percentage commission. The latter clause was intended primarily to prohibit the practice of movie packaging deals.

On April 12, 2019, the WGA failed to renew its franchise agreement with the ATA (which attempted to compromise by proposing that writers receive 0.8% of gross profits from packaging deals); its executive director Karen Stuart stated that "despite our best efforts, today's outcome was driven by the Guild's predetermined course for chaos", and that the Code of Conduct "will hurt all artists, delivering an especially painful blow to mid-level and emerging writers, while dictating how agencies of all sizes should function." Many major talent agencies, including the four dominant Hollywood agencies (William Morris Agency, Creative Artists Agency, United Talent Agency and ICM Partners) refused to sign the Code of Conduct. Nevertheless, the WGA stated that effective April 13, WGA members would be prohibited from working with agents that have not signed the Code of Conduct, and would be obligated to fire them.

On April 17, 2019, WGA East and WGA West filed a lawsuit in Los Angeles Superior Court against WMA, CAA, UTA, and ICM, citing that the practice of movie packaging represented kickbacks that were illegal under the Taft-Hartley Act. Approximately 95 percent of Guild members voted "in favor of a code of conduct that would cease packaging fees." During the week following its lawsuit filing; en masse, over 7,000 Guild members fired their talent agents (as ordered by the Guild), as "not just drastically out-earning them, but preventing them from receiving better pay." WGA West president David Goodman stated that "in a period of unprecedented profits and growth of our business ... writers themselves are actually earning less".

In June 2019, the WGA and ATA resumed talks. The WGA rejected its offers (which once again included a revenue sharing proposal), with Goodman stating that "we will not counter on revenue sharing because it suggests the answer is somewhere in the middle. It is not". He stated that the WGA planned to bypass the ATA and negotiate individually with nine individual agencies that represented a "significant" number of WGA members, and that "this fight has shown the Guild's strength and sense of purpose."

After Endeavor and the UTA filed lawsuits against the WGA accusing it of engaging in an "illegal group boycott", the WGA sent a cease and desist notice to the ATA stating that "the ATA and its members have continued to collusively impose packaging fees on programs written by WGA-represented writers", and that "following news that Verve had negotiated a Code of Conduct and Franchise Agreement with the WGA, the ATA, and its leading members closed ranks and threatened to retaliate against Verve and, implicitly, against any agency that subsequently reached an agreement with the guild."

All four major agencies later signed franchise agreements with the WGA, which include mandating compliance with the Code of Conduct by prohibiting them from holding more than a 20% interest in an affiliated production company.

== See also ==
- Writers Guild of America Award
- 1960 Writers Guild of America strike
- 1981 Writers Guild of America strike
- 1988 Writers Guild of America strike
- 2007–08 Writers Guild of America strike
  - Effect of the 2007–08 Writers Guild of America strike on television
- 2023 Writers Guild of America strike
  - List of productions impacted by the 2023 Writers Guild of America strike
- WGA screenwriting credit system
- WGA script registration service
