= Screenwriters Association =

Indian Labor union

- Screenwriters Association
- Founded: 1954
- Headquarters: Mumbai, India
- Location: India
- Key people: Robin Bhatt, President; Preeti Mamgain, Vice President; Mitesh Shah, Vice President; Zaman Habib, General Secretary; Danish Javed, Treasurer
- Affiliations: International Affiliation of Writers Guilds
- Website: www.swaindia.org

The Screenwriters Association (formerly Film Writer's Association) is a labour union based in Mumbai, India. Members are authors, novelists, playwrights, and journalists who work in films, TV, and digital media. Members of SWA can register their scripts, screenplays and lyrics with the organisation, and seek recourse in case of a dispute. SWA has a legal officer on board and the dispute settlement committee handles cases pertaining to writers' rights regarding credit and payments.

The Screenwriters Association is an autonomous body, for writers and run by writers of India. On 27 September 2020 the Screenwriters Association held its first ever award ceremony.
