= Writers Guild of America West =

Labor union formed in 1954

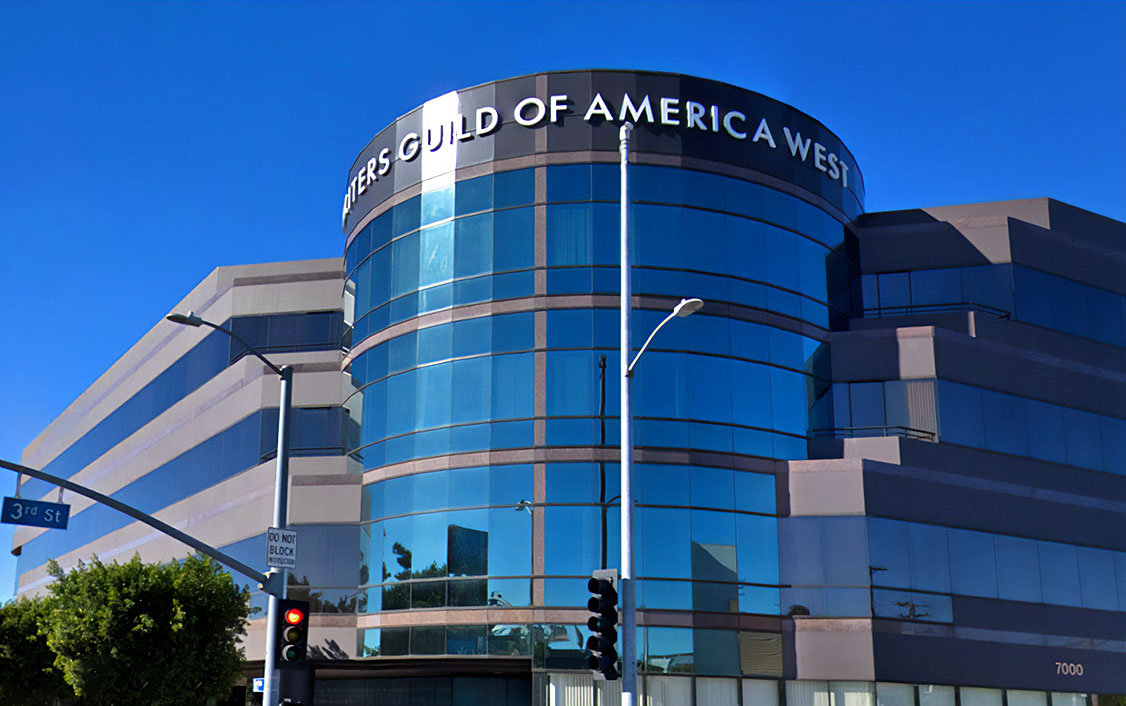
- Writers Guild of America West - 7000 W 3rd St, Los Angeles, California
- Abbreviation: WGA West; WGAW
- Predecessor: Screen Writers Guild
- Founded: 1954
- Headquarters: Los Angeles, California, U.S.
- Location: United States
- Members: 10,338 (full members); 3,375 (other members) (2026)
- President: Michele Mulroney
- Vice President: Travis Donnelly
- Key people: Peter Murrieta, Secretary/Treasurer
- Affiliations: IAWG; WGA
- Website: www.wga.org

The Writers Guild of America West (Note: Writers Guild of America, West until 2017.) (WGA West or WGAW) is a labor union representing film, television, radio, and new media writers. It was formed in 1954 from five organizations representing writers, including the Screen Writers Guild. It has around 14,000 total members as of 2026.

The WGAW and the Writers Guild of America East (WGAE), though independent entities, jointly brand themselves together as the Writers Guild of America (WGA), and cooperate on activities such as launching coordinated strike actions, and administering both the Writers Guild of America Awards and the WGA screenwriting credit system. Generally, members initially join the West Guild if they are west of the Mississippi River, and are not required to transfer between the two organizations if they relocate across the river.

== Governance ==
The WGAW is governed by its membership. Elections for a board of directors are held annually by secret mail-in ballot. Half of the board is elected each year to a two-year term of office, and a board member may not serve more than four consecutive terms. In 2022 the officers are:

- President: Meredith Stiehm
- Vice President: Michele Mulroney
- Secretary-Treasurer: Betsy Thomas
- Board of Directors: Liz Hsiao Lan Alper, Raphael Bob-Waksberg, Angelina Burnett, Robb Chavis, Adam Conover, Marjorie David, Travis Donnelly, Ashley Gable, Justin Halpern, Dante W. Harper, Eric Haywood, Deric A. Hughes, Zoe Marshall, Dailyn Rodriguez, John Rogers, and Nicole Yorkin.

David Young is employed as the Guild's executive director and Tony Segall is general counsel. Young served as the Guild's chief negotiator during the 2007 contract negotiations and subsequent 100-day strike. On November 3, 2023, the guild announced that Young will be stepping down from his role and will be replaced with Ellen Stutzman.

According to WGAW's Department of Labor records since 2006, over half of the guild's total membership is ineligible to vote, comprising the guild's "post current", "emeritus", and "associate" members.

=== Past presidents ===
Since the formation of the Writers Guild of America West (WGAW) in 1954 there have been 33 presidents. The first President was screenwriter Richard L. Breen, followed by:

Edmund L. Hartmann, Curtis Kenyon, Ken Englund, Charles Schnee, James R. Webb, Nate Monaster, Christopher Knopf, Michael Blankfort, Melville Shavelson, Ranald MacDougall, John Furia Jr., David W. Rintels, Daniel Taradash, Frank Pierson, Ernest Lehman, George Kirgo, Del Reisman, Brad Radnitz, Daniel Petrie Jr., John Wells, Victoria Riskin, Charles D. Holland, Patric M. Verrone, Christopher Keyser, Howard A. Rodman and David A. Goodman.

The current president is screenwriter and producer Meredith Stiehm.

== History ==
Membership (US records)
View source data.

The Screen Writers Guild (SWG) was formed in 1921 by a group of ten screenwriters in Hollywood angered over wage reductions announced by the major film studios. The group affiliated with the Authors Guild in 1933 and began representing TV writers in 1948. In 1954, the SWG was one of five groups who merged to represent professional writers on both coasts and became the Writers Guild of America, East (WGAe) and West (WGAW). Howard J. Green and John Howard Lawson were the first two presidents during the SWG era. Daniel Taradash was president of the WGAW from 1977 to 1979.

In 1952, the Guild authorized movie studios to delete onscreen credits for any writers who had not been cleared by Congress, as part of the industry's blacklisting of writers with alleged communist or leftist leanings or affiliations.

From March to August 1988, WGAW members were on strike against the major American television networks in a dispute over residuals from repeat airings and foreign/home video use of scripted shows and made-for-TV movies. The 22-week strike crippled American broadcast television and drove millions of viewers, disgusted with the lack of new scripted programming, to cable channels and home video, a blow to ratings and revenues from which, some industry watchers argue, the networks have never fully recovered.

In 2004, Victoria Riskin resigned as WGAW President after being accused by her opponent Eric Hughes during the 2003 election of using a sham writing contract to maintain her membership status. She was replaced by vice-president Charles Holland, who resigned a few weeks later when questions arose about statements he had made about his college football career and his claim of having secretly served in combat as a Green Beret, a claim his army records did not support. After Riskin's resignation, the U.S. Department of Labor investigated the sham contract and concluded that Riskin was indeed ineligible to run. The WGAW entered into a settlement by offering to re-run the election under DOL supervision. A new election was held in September 2004 between Eric Hughes and Daniel Petrie Jr. which Petrie won.

On April 17, 2019, WGA West and WGA East filed a lawsuit in Los Angeles Superior Court against the four dominant Hollywood talent agencies, William Morris Agency, Creative Artists Agency, United Talent Agency and ICM Partners, citing movie packaging fee practices, which the WGA asserts are a violation of state and federal laws. Approximately 95 percent of Guild members voted "in favor of a code of conduct that would cease packaging fees."

During the week following its lawsuit filing; en masse, over 7,000 Guild members fired their talent agents, as "not just drastically out-earning them, but preventing them from receiving better pay." WGA president David A. Goodman was then quoted as stating to NPR "that in a period of unprecedented profits and growth of our business ... writers themselves are actually earning less".

== Reality United ==
In June 2005, WGAW started a "reality rights" campaign to allow writers of reality television shows to qualify for guild rights and benefits. The union maintained that the storytellers who conceive the tests and confrontations on such shows were bona fide writers. The Guild also expressed concern the 1988 strike showed that lack of representation in the genre would weaken their future bargaining position. Studio executives maintained that these employees were primarily editors, not writers, and that the shows needed to appear to be unscripted in order for viewers to feel they were "real."

As part of this campaign, on September 20, 2006, the WGAW held a Los Angeles unity rally in support of the America's Next Top Model writers' strike. President Patric Verrone said, "Every piece of media with a moving image on a screen or a recorded voice must have a writer, and every writer must have a WGA contract."

On November 6, 2006, the WGAW filed an unfair labor practice complaint with the National Labor Relations Board after Top Model producers said the show's next season would be produced using a new system that would not require writers. In response, Verrone said, "as they demanded union representation, the company decided they were expendable. This is illegal strikebreaking."

== Work stoppages ==
=== 2007–2008 Writers Guild of America strike ===
On November 2, 2007, the Guild again went on strike, this time over writers' share of revenues from DVD releases and from Internet, cellphone shows, and other new media uses of programs and films written by members. The strike vote followed the expiration of the guild's contract with the Alliance of Motion Picture and Television Producers.

=== 2023 Writers Guild of America strike ===
Since March 2023, the Writers Guild of America had been in contract negotiations with the Alliance of Motion Picture and Television Producers (AMPTP). The current contract ended at 11:59 PM PDT on May 1, 2023.

Since an acceptable new contract was not negotiated, WGA members officially voted for a strike commencing on May 2, 2023. The vote by WGA members was: 9,020 (97.85%) in favor and 198 (2.15%) opposed. Total ballots cast was 9,218 (78.79% of eligible WGA members). The vote set a new record for both turnout and the percentage of support in a strike authorization vote.

On April 22, 2023, the SAG-AFTRA National Board voted unanimously to pass a resolution in support of WGA negotiations with the AMPTP.

In preparation, the WGA published its strike rules. The WGA Negotiating Committee is led by Ellen Stutzman (chief negotiator), David A. Goodman (co-chair) and Chris Keyser (co-chair).

On May 1, 2023, negotiations between WGA and AMPTP concluded without a deal. Hollywood trade publication Deadline reported that as of May 2, 2023 at 12:01 am PDT the Writers Guild of America was on strike. On September 23, 2023, news outlets reported that the WGA and Alliance of Motion Picture and Television Producers were close to a final resolution and expected a resolution to be had by the end of the weekend. On September 24, 2023, it was announced that the writers and the studios reached a tentative agreement.

== Staff discontent & internal labor disputes ==
On February 17, 2026, the staff of the Writers Guild of America West, organized under Pacific Northwest Staff Union (PNWSU), walked off the job on an Unfair Labor Practice (ULP) strike. PNWSU members picketed outside of the WGA West offices in Los Angeles, CA, and at the Writers Guild Theater in Beverly Hills. Their local, the Writers Guild Staff Union (WGSU) organized in the spring of 2025, and they had been negotiating their first contract with management (WGAW), intermittently, since September 2025. On March 31, 2026, the staff union discovered, and publicly shared, that their members were set to lose their health insurance coverage as this internal strike entered its sixth week. This came after the WGAW amended the eligibility requirements for health coverage, and citing that as an administrative justification for booting the staff from their healthcare. On April 17, 2026, two months into the strike, the WGSU held an election to determine whether or not to continue the strike. Of those who voted, 85% voted in favor of staying on strike.

On May 8, 2026, on the 83rd day of the strike a tentative deal was reached between PNWSU and the WGAW. This was the longest strike by a staff union against a labor union employer in American history. The staff union voted to ratify the contract the following day, and staff returned to work on May 11, the following Monday.

== Magazine ==
Written By, the WGAW's official journal since 1997, is published six times a year.

== Writers Guild Theater ==
Writers Guild Theater, on South Doheny Drive, in Beverly Hills, is a 473-seat theater, with 2,000 square feet of "flexible space".

== Writers Guild Foundation ==
In 1966, the Writers Guild Foundation was founded by Writers Guild members to raise money for writers to attend the International Writers Guild conference in Los Angeles. The Writers Guild Foundation is a 501(c)(3) non profit organization that is affiliated with, but independent of, the WGAW.

== See also ==
- Writers Guild of America East (WGAE)
- International Affiliation of Writers Guilds (IAWG)
- Writers Guild of America Award
- 1960 Writers Guild of America strike
- 1981 Writers Guild of America strike
- 1988 Writers Guild of America strike
- 2007–08 Writers Guild of America strike
  - Effect of the 2007–08 Writers Guild of America strike on television
- 2023 Writers Guild of America strike
- WGA screenwriting credit system
- WGA script registration service
