= Screen Writers Guild =

Defunct union of screenwriters

The Screen Writers Guild was an organization of Hollywood screenplay authors, formed as a union in 1933. A rival organisation, Screen Playwrights, Inc., was established by the film studios and producers, but after an appeal to the National Labor Relations Board and a vote by eligible screenwriters, the Screenwriters Guild won out as the sole representative body. Its house publication was The Screen Writer. In 1954, it became two different organizations: Writers Guild of America, West and the Writers Guild of America, East.

== Background and establishment ==
Screenwriters' earliest attempts at organizing date back to the 1910s, when film scenarists participated in The Authors League of America (now the Authors Guild). However, screenwriters soon identified a need to form their own organization, since they had different work products and challenges than literary writers. Another attempt at representation was the Photoplay Authors’ League, founded in 1914 in Los Angeles, but it disbanded after two years.

In Summer 1920, twelve writers announced the formation of the Screen Writers Guild. They published an open letter in Variety, defining six objectives of the organization, and inviting all industry writers to apply for membership. Members had to derive income from some form of film writing, and to receive nominations from two existing members.

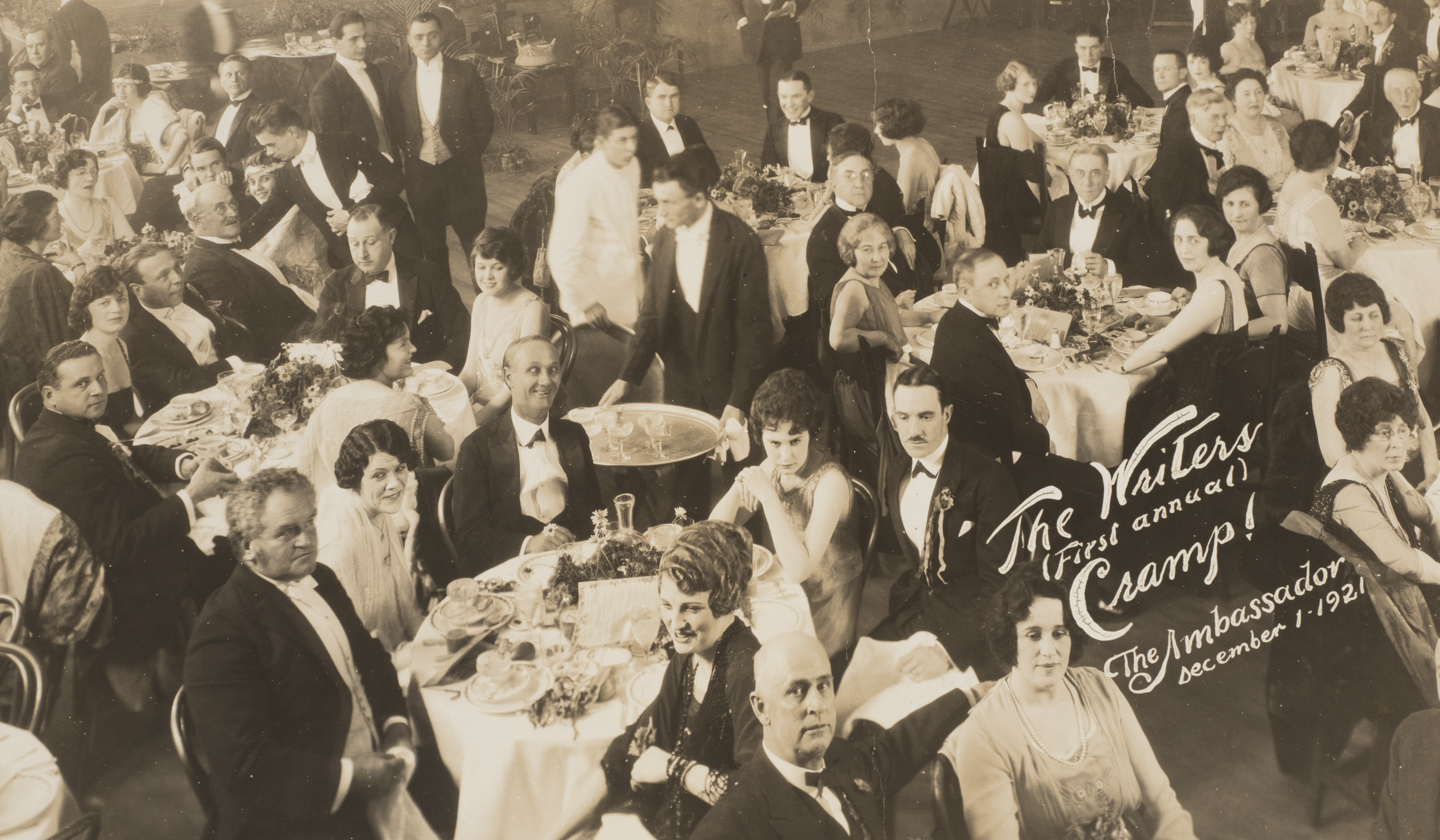
Inaugural dinner party for The Writers social club at the Ambassador Hotel, December 1, 1920

In 1921, The Guild also formed a social arm, The Writers' Club. The club purchased a mansion at 6700 Sunset Boulevard and converted it to a clubhouse, which became a gathering place for SWG members. The Writers held numerous dinners, WAMPAS Baby Stars Candidates Parades, parties, and presentations of one-act plays through the mid-1930s.

Starting in 1927, several historic trends caused the SWG's organizing and representation efforts to become nearly inactive. Louis B. Mayer founded the Academy of Motion Pictures Arts and Sciences as a means of bypassing union negotiations. Warner Brothers released the first commercial sound film, The Jazz Singer, bringing fundamental changes to screenwriting. And the Great Depression began taking a toll on all aspects of filmmaking economics.

In 1933, ten writers met to discuss revitalizing the SWG as union under the protection of laws governing unions under consideration by Congress and eventually embodied in the Wagner Act of 1935. They included Donald Ogden Stewart, Charles Brackett, John Bright, Philip Dunne, Dorothy Parker and Howard J. Green; the union's first president. Others active in the 1930s included Lillian Hellman, Dashiell Hammett, Ogden Nash, Frances Goodrich, Albert Hackett, and Maurice Rapf. John Howard Lawson was also a co-founder, who was also a key player in resurrecting it in 1937. Gladys Lehman became the organization's first official amanuensis and secretary, as no one else wanted the job. She continued as a screenwriter until 1953 and the House Un-American Activities Committee (HUAC).

SWG sought to establish criteria for crediting authors for creating or contributing to a screenplay, known as "screen credits." Its house publication was The Screen Writer.

== Screen Playwrights Inc. (1938) ==
The film studios responded by refusing to hire Guild members and forming a rival organization called the Screen Playwrights Inc. When the Guild appealed to the National Labor Relations Board (NLRB), the NLRB certified the Guild as the "exclusive bargaining agency" for screenwriters employed by 13 of 18 Hollywood studios, based on elections in 1938 which writers chose the Guild over the Screen Playwrights. At that time, Screen Writers Guild Inc. had 502 members, and Screen Playwrights Inc. had only 132. Screen Writers Guild received 271 out of a possible 342 eligible writers. The film producers acceded to the NLRB ruling in March 1939.

== HUAC (1940s) ==
Beginning in 1940, the Guild came under attack by the House Committee on Un-American Activities for the "radical communist leanings" of many of its members. The attacks escalated in 1947, when more than a dozen writers were called to testify. Screenwriter Jack Moffitt, an ardent anti-Communist, who had been a member of Screen Playwrights, Inc. and had been embittered by its demise, testified against many screenwriters, including Frank Tuttle, Herbert Biberman, Donald Ogden Stewart, and John Howard Lawson.

Lillian Hellman responded with an essay in The Screen Writer, the Guild's publication, attacking the Committee for its investigation and the film industry's owners for submitting to the Committee's intimidation. It described the committee's hearings:

A sickening, sickening, immoral and degraded week. And why did it take place? It took place because those who wish war have not the common touch. Highly placed gentlemen are often not really gentleman, and don't know how to go about these things. Remember that when it was needed, in Europe, they had to find the house painter and the gangster to make fear work and terror acceptable to the ignorant. Circuses will do it, and this was just such a circus; hide the invasion of the American Constitution with the faces of movie actors; pander to ignorance by telling people that ignorance is good, and lies even better; bring on the millionaire movie producer and show that he too is human, he too is frightened and cowardly. Take him away from his golden house and make him a betrayer and a fool and for those who like such shows and enjoy such moral degradation.

== Split (1954) ==
In 1954, the members of the Screen Writers Guild backed the formation of a national union of a broader organization of writers working in motion pictures, television and radio, divided into two geographical bodies: Writers Guild of America, West and the Writers Guild of America, East.

== See also ==
- Writers Guild of America
