= My Nah Nah Nah =

- Scrubs episode
- Episode no.: Season 8 Episode 11
- Directed by: John Putch
- Written by: Kevin Biegel
- Production code: 712
- Original air date: March 18, 2009

Guest appearances
- Josh Elliott as Himself; Hannah Storm as Herself; Tim DeKay as Rich Hill; Robert Maschio as Dr. Todd Quinlan; Christa Miller as Jordan Sullivan; Phoebe Dorin as Mrs. Jensen; Kit Pongetti as Ladinia "Lady" Williams; Robert Clendenin as Dr. Paul Zeltzer

Episode chronology
← Previous "My Comedy Show"	Next → "Their Story II"
- Scrubs season 8

"My Nah Nah Nah" is the eleventh episode of the eighth season and 161st overall episode of the American television sitcom Scrubs. Written by Kevin Biegel and directed by John Putch, it originally aired on March 18, 2009 on ABC.

== Plot ==
Turk hears about a risky therapeutic hypothermia procedure while watching SportsCenter, and he considers using it in an attempt to restore a paralyzed teenager's ability to walk. When he asks Carla for advice, she tells him to do what he would do if the patient were one of their children. Turk administers the treatment and later the patient moves his index finger, indicating that the treatment has worked, and Carla is proud of him, despite her anger after finding out Turk learned about the treatment from SportsCenter.

Jordan gets mad at Dr. Cox when he wears their wedding ring while Lady refuses to hold Janitor's hand, and this upsets and confuses the Janitor, to the amusement of J.D. Janitor begins avoiding Lady, fearing that she plans to break up with him. Elliot offers unsolicited advice to both Jordan and the Janitor, telling them not to be afraid of being vulnerable. Janitor sits down to talk with Lady, and is surprised to learn that Lady is simply a germophobe; Janitor learns that it can be fun to "steer" Lady away from germs with an affectionate hand on her shoulder. Jordan begins wearing her wedding ring as well, but forbids Dr. Cox to discuss it.

== Production ==
According to Bill Lawrence, this episode reused some material of the never shown and only partly produced episode from season seven, "My Commitment", mainly that of Turk and SportsCenter, which was shot during the 2007–2008 Writers Guild of America strike.

During the end credits, Dr. Cox hurls J.D. onto a hospital bed, and claims that it is "Involuntary Luge". This can also be found on the Season 5 DVD set, on the first DVD, as a hidden extra.

== Reception ==
The TV Critic commented that this episode featured lazy writing and poor comedy, particularly since it did not feature the new interns, who "really gave this show a new lease of life", and also noted that as the finale approaches the stories become happier and happier.

Alan Sepinwall of The Star-Ledger also noted that he found himself wishing for some of the absent recurring characters and said this episode felt like the "flattest episode of the season".

Seth Amitin of IGN believed that Scrubs took its tie-in with SportsCenter too far, saying that it felt as though Scrubs was trying too hard to appease their new channel. However, he felt this led to an interesting episode, which ended on a hopeful note, which, Amitin added, he hopes the series as a whole will do.
