= 1988 Writers Guild of America strike =

American strike action, March–August 1988

- Date: March 7 – August 7, 1988 (5 months, or 153 days)
- Location: United States
- Caused by: Lack of agreement on a new contract between Writers Guild of America and AMPTP
- Methods: Picketing, protest
- Result: Agreement to end strike reached on August 7, 1988

Parties
| Writers Guild of America, East; Writers Guild of America West | AMPTP |

The 1988 Writers Guild of America strike was a strike action taken by members of both the Writers Guild of America, East (WGAE) and the Writers Guild of America, West (WGAW) against major United States television and film studios represented by the Alliance of Motion Picture and Television Producers (AMPTP). The strike, which ran from March 7 to August 7, 1988, affected production on movies and TV shows. At 153 days, it remains the longest strike in the history of the WGA, surpassing the 1960 strike and the 2023 strike by 5 days each.

== Summary ==
Formal negotiations between the writers guilds and producers began in January 1988. The main disagreements included:

- Residuals for hour-long shows (producers, claiming syndicated reruns of these shows were performing poorly, wanted a softened, percentage-based formula; writers wanted a residual hike)
- Expanded creative rights (the writers wanted consultation on the choice of actors and directors for some projects)
- Cost cuts in other areas (a producers' demand)

The guilds' previous deal with producers expired on February 29, 1988. One day later, 96% of guild membership authorized a strike. On March 7, 1988, one day after rejecting a softened final offer from producers, 9,000 movie and television writers went on strike. Negotiations took place during March and April under a federal mediator but broke off before resuming on May 23, again with a federal mediator.

After intensive bargaining, producers made a "strike settlement offer" on June 16, 1988; the offer included an extended contract term (to four years) and expansion of creative rights, but still included the percentage-based residuals studios demanded and not a foreign residual increase writers demanded. The offer was turned down by the guilds' membership by a 3–1 margin.

During July 1988, the Guild devised an interim contract. Membership approved it, and more than 150 smaller producers signed it. Major studios and outlets including Fox, Paramount, and the "Big Three" television networks refused projects from the independents who signed the deal, leading to the Guild filing an antitrust suit accusing 18 studios and networks of mounting an illegal boycott. Twenty-one dissident Guild members who still favored the June 16 offer filed a charge with the National Labor Relations Board to seek invalidation of Guild rules that barred them from returning to work during a strike; some dissidents threatened to resign Guild membership and return to work if the strike was not settled by July 28.

On July 23, 1988, formal bargaining resumed, again under the auspices of federal mediators; by July 30 talks collapsed, with studios threatening to not bargain any further and to concentrate on producing work with non-union scripts. Behind-the-scenes "shuttle diplomacy" involving Guild negotiators, studio heads, and emissaries began on July 31 in an effort to revive talks. Guild officials and studio representatives met on August 2 to discuss the proposals, and on August 3 announced a tentative deal. While the new deal gave studios the sliding residual scale they sought for hour-long reruns, writers won a modest financial gain when hour-long shows were sold internationally. The writers also gained creative rights regarding original screenplays and TV movies. The Guild board approved the deal by a 26–6 vote; Guild membership also approved the deal (2,111 in favor, 412 against), and the strike formally ended on August 7, 1988.

== Effects of the strike ==
=== Television ===
The writers' strike forced the major TV networks to hold off the start of their fall 1988 schedule later than usual; rather than the traditional late-September/early-October start, new and returning TV series' debuts were delayed until late October and into November (one NBC series, In the Heat of the Night, and two ABC series, Moonlighting and Thirtysomething, did not start their second seasons until early December). In the interim, the networks had to rely on a hodgepodge of programming, including reruns, movies, entertainment and news specials, program-length political advertising, and unscripted original series (e.g. CBS' High Risk). Networks also benefited from sports programming, including NBC, which relied on the Summer Olympics in September and the World Series in October, and ABC, which in addition to its postseason baseball coverage, moved up the start time for the early weeks of Monday Night Football from 9 p.m. ET to 8 p.m. ET (MacGyver, which normally aired at 8 p.m., was not yet ready with new episodes). The 1988–89 television season was the first of four television seasons to have its start delayed due to issues outside of the control of the major networks; the next two instances occurred in the 2001–02 season (due to the networks' news coverage of the September 11 attacks), the 2020–21 season (due to the suspension of television productions as a result of the COVID-19 pandemic), and the 2023–24 season (due to the 2023 Hollywood labor disputes).

While waiting for their fall seasons to begin, the networks still had access to scripted original series. Despite refusing earlier in the summer to accept new projects from independents who settled with the Guild, TV networks gained a benefit from the Guilds' decision to offer independent contracts to producers, with the offers beginning in late May 1988. The agreements would allow producers and writers of such shows as The Cosby Show, A Different World, The Tonight Show Starring Johnny Carson, and Late Night with David Letterman to resume work. Johnny Carson actually resumed work on The Tonight Show before the agreement, returning with the Guild's blessing on May 11, 1988 (after Tonight was in reruns since the strike's start), without writers and with his own material; David Letterman would follow suit, returning to Late Night on June 29.

The strike coincided with Fox's latest relaunch of The Late Show. Following the cancellation of The Wilton North Report, the program returned on March 10, 1988, four days after the strike began, with comedians Jeff Joseph and John Mulrooney as hosts. Fox continued production during the strike because the two hosts wrote their own material. After Ross Shafer became the permanent host on April 15, the program continued production for the duration of the strike, relying in part on unscripted segments and theme shows until the strike ended on August 7, 1988.

The strike also led to a revival of Mission: Impossible; ABC, in search of original content for Fall 1988, used reworked scripts from the original version of M:I and filmed them in Australia (where production costs at the time were lower than that in the Hollywood area), making the new M:I one of the first American commercial network programs to be filmed there. NBC took a similar approach with its new sitcom Dear John, using some reworked episodes that were from the original version that aired on Britain's BBC. CBS revived The Smothers Brothers Comedy Hour, nearly 20 years after throwing the duo off the air for poor taste, and gave them carte blanche to perform their own existing material.

Soap operas continued to air during the strike; however, without experienced script writers many suffered in quality. At first most stories were dragged out for as long as possible, then plots lurched forward that did not leave shows in the best of shape, including Santa Barbara, which was already struggling in ratings as a result of Bridget and Jerome Dobson being fired. Saturday morning programming for the 1988–1989 season was mostly unaffected, as animation writers were not part of the strike; a notable exception was CBS' live-action series Pee-wee's Playhouse, which only had two new episodes and a prime-time Christmas special that season. The animation exemption also led to several animated specials being aired, including a new Peanuts miniseries (This Is America, Charlie Brown) and an adaptation of a Garfield book, Garfield: His 9 Lives.

The strike significantly shrunk average television audiences, and had a lasting effect.

The strike did not, as some later claimed, lead to the advent of reality television (which did not rise to its current level of popularity until over a decade later), mainly due to the fact that it began in the traditional summer "offseason" when little new scripted programming was being produced anyway. One notable exception was COPS on the Fox television network, which was commissioned as the result of a strike and remained on Fox's Saturday night lineup until 2013 before moving to Spike, the current Paramount Network.

The cancellation of Moonlighting was attributed in part to audience loss stemming from the shows' long hiatuses due to the writers' strike.

=== Films ===
The horror film Halloween 4: The Return of Michael Myers narrowly avoided the strike. Writer Alan B. McElroy had only 11 days in which to come up with the film's story and subsequently write the script. McElroy did just this and managed to turn the script in just hours before the strike commenced.

The 1988 movie Earth Girls Are Easy was filmed during this strike; co-writer Charlie Coffey did not appear in the movie due to being on the picket lines. The 1988 horror film Child's Play, the first installment in the Chucky franchise, was also filmed during the strike. As a result, the screenwriter Don Mancini was minimally involved in the film beyond the writing and pre-production phase.

According to the Ultimate James Bond DVD Collection, the movie Licence to Kill, starring Timothy Dalton, lost one of its co-writers, Richard Maibaum, so his partner Michael G. Wilson elected to finish the screenplay on his own.

Sam Hamm turned in his script for 1989's Batman just days before the writer's strike began, and was unable to write further drafts due to his involvement. Director Tim Burton and others liked the script, but thought "something" was missing. As such he brought in Beetlejuice co-writers Warren Skaaren and Charles McKeown for rewrite work. Jonathan Gems did a few weeks worth of rewriting as well. Gems and McKeown were British as just about every single writer in America was on strike. Their draft introduced the Joker's role as the killer of Bruce Wayne's parents, a revelation Burton wanted from the beginning. Hamm, staying true to the source material, had refused to use the idea. One of the primary reasons as to why the filmmakers brought in McKeown was that they felt he could come up with more creative jokes for The Joker.

The 1988 work stoppage laid the foundation for the next decade's "spec-script boom," as documented by Thom Taylor in The Big Deal: Hollywood's Million-Dollar Spec Script Market (HarperCollins, 1999). The reasons for this were primarily two-fold: (1) striking writers returned home from picket-lines to write screenplays on speculation that they would someday sell them after the strike ended; and (2) studio development pipelines had dried up, requiring buyers to often participate in bidding-wars for completed feature scripts. With regularity, literary agents were able to drive sale prices into million-dollar deals.

== See also ==
- List of Hollywood strikes
  - 1960 Writers Guild of America strike
  - 1981 Writers Guild of America strike
  - 2007–08 Writers Guild of America strike
  - 2023 Writers Guild of America strike
