= Writers Guild of Canada =

Trade union

- Abbreviation: WGC
- Founded: 1943
- Headquarters: Toronto, Ontario
- Location: Canada
- Members: 2600
- Key people: Victoria Shen, executive director; Bruce Smith, president
- Affiliations: IAWG
- Website: www.wgc.ca

The Writers Guild of Canada (WGC) is a trade union representing professional writers working in film, television, radio, and digital media production in Canada. Members of the WGC write dramatic TV series, feature films, Movies of the Week, documentaries, animation, comedy and variety series, children's and educational programming, radio drama, as well as corporate videos and digital media productions. The organization administers the annual WGC Screenwriting Awards.

On behalf of its members, the WGC negotiates, administers and enforces collective agreements, setting out minimum rates, terms, and working conditions for all English-language productions in Canada. The central collective agreement, the Independent Production Agreement (IPA), is negotiated between the WGC and the Canadian Media Production Association (CMPA), the association representing independent producers in Canada. In addition to the IPA, the WGC also has agreements in place with the APFTQ, CBC Radio, CBC Television, CTV, the NFB and TVOntario. The WGC is formally recognized as the official bargaining agent for English-language professional screenwriters under the federal Status of the Artist Act and Quebec's Status of the Artist Legislation.

The WGC is also a member of the International Affiliation of Writers Guilds. Its current president is Bruce Smith.

== History ==
The Association of Canadian Radio Artists was established in 1943 to advocate for better working conditions and wages for radio performers. Over time, writers also joined the organization, leading to its transformation into the Association of Canadian Television and Radio Artists (ACTRA) in the following decade.

In 1984, the Alliance of Canadian Cinema, Television and Radio Artists (ACTRA) was formed to encompass other areas of the broadcasting industry. From ACTRA, several guilds emerged and developed, notably the ACTRA Performer's Guild, Writers Guild of Canada, and ACTRA Media Guild. In 1993, the Writers Guild of Canada left ACTRA to become an independent union.

In February 2023, Victoria Shen was named as the WGC's executive director, replacing executive director and CEO Maureen Parker. During the 2023 Writers Guild of America strike, the WGC expressed its support for the WGA and urged its members not to accept work on struck projects.

== Governance ==
The WGC is governed by a seven-member council of its members, which receives input from a fifteen-member national forum. Members of council and the national forum are elected from five regions (Atlantic, Quebec, Central, Western and Pacific), and serve two-year terms. The national forum meets annually with the council and the executive staff.

== See also ==
- Lists of Canadian writers
