= WGA script registration service =

The WGA script registration service is a service run by both the Writers Guild of America, East (WGAE) and the Writers Guild of America West (WGAW) to establish the date of creation of literary property, typically a motion picture screenplay, useful in the often-contentious US entertainment field.

The service supports the WGA screenwriting credit system but is also available for non-members to use. This is one of the distinctions that makes the WGAE and WGAW true guilds and not simply a trade union bargaining for existing members.

Registration with the guilds has become important in lawsuits for copyright infringement, especially where the degree of copying is very loose or vague or conceptual: invoking a guild itself as registrar indicates that the guilds' standard concept of property rights in literary works were expected to be followed by at least the registrant.

Although registration is an important part of assisting in protecting a writer's rights to his or her work and determining compensation, registration is not the same as a US copyright. Although a registration may constitute evidence in a copyright dispute, registration is not proof of copyright registration or ownership. Additionally, an official copyright registration with the US Library of Congress is required to invoke the jurisdiction of US federal courts, where most copyright infringement claims are adjudicated.

== See also ==
- Screenwriter
- Writers Guild of America Award
