= International Affiliation of Writers Guilds =

International trade union

IAWG
- International Affiliation of Writers Guilds
- Abbreviation: IAWG
- Founded: 1986
- Location: International
- Website: iawg.org

The International Affiliation of Writers Guilds is an international trade union federation representing guilds of professional screenwriters and playwrights.Some affiliates also belong to national trade union federations.

== Activities ==
The IAWG strives to ensure that fair royalties and residuals are collected by enforcement of copyrights. If a member of one guild emigrates to another country or the movie or play is exported, member guilds automatically recognize their membership through reciprocal agreements.

A core function is the registering of scripts to verify original authorship. Most affiliates also have annual award ceremonies to celebrate accomplishments in the craft.

== History ==
The International Writers' Guild was founded in 1966 by unions from the United Kingdom, United States, and Yugoslavia. It gradually grew, but in 1986 it was replaced by the "International Affiliation of Writers' Guilds", with its founding members all being in English-speaking countries. It has since expanded, with affiliates from several other countries. In 2007, it organised an International Day of Solidarity with the Writers Guild of America strike. Since 2009, it has worked closely with the Federation of Screenwriters in Europe. There are 50,000 writers in the IAWG.

== Affiliates ==
- ALMA (Spain)
- La Guilde Française des Scénaristes (France)
- New Zealand Writers Guild
- Screenwriters Association (India)
- Scriptwriters' Guild of Israel
- Société des Auteurs de Radio, Télévision et Cinéma (Canada)
- Verband Deutscher Drehbuchautoren (Germany)
- Writers Guild of America, East
- Writers Guild of America, West
- Writers Guild of Canada
- Writers' Guild of Great Britain
- Writers' Guild of Ireland
- Writers' Guild of South Africa

== Chairs ==
2005: Carl Gottlieb
2009: Michael Winship

== See also ==
- Federation of Scriptwriters in Europe
- Union Network International
