= American Star (rowing boat) =

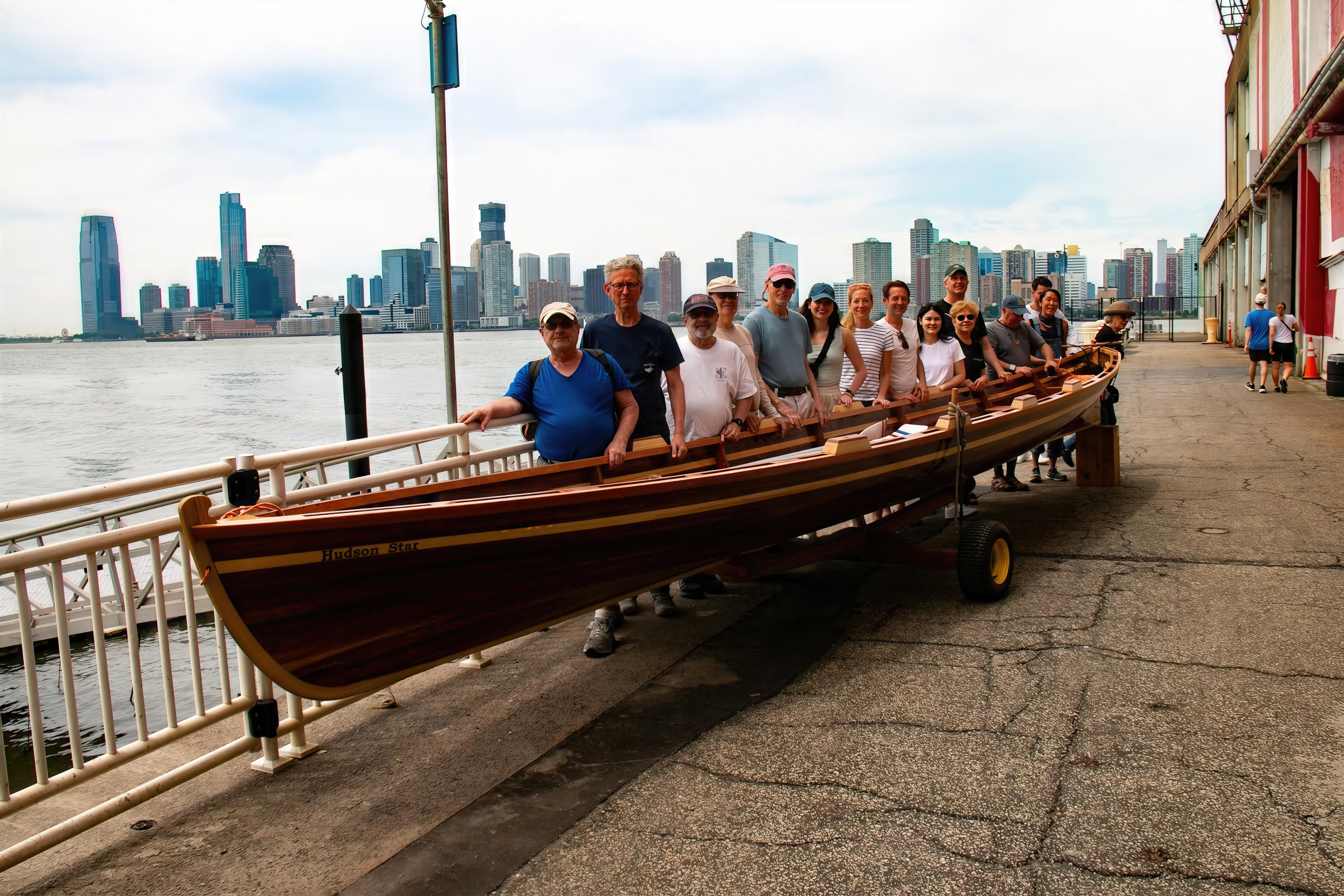
The Hudson Star and her builders in NYC at the Village Community Boathouse. Replica of the 1824 boat American Star

The American Star is the Whitehall gig that won a famous rowing race across the Hudson River in 1824. In 1825 it was gifted to General Lafayette who was visiting New York at that time.

== History ==
Late in the fall of 1824, twelve years after the War of 1812, the captain of a British warship anchored off the Battery issued a friendly challenge, offering $1,000 (about $30,000 today) to any local crew that could defeat his four best oarsmen in a race to Hoboken and back. On December 9, a crowd of 50,000 people, one-third of the city's population, gathered at the Battery to watch the showdown, “by far the largest crowd up to that time, and for some time after, to view an American sporting event,” marine historian John Gardner wrote. The local entry, the American Star, defeated Sudden Death (or Certain Death), the British gig, by a few hundred yards in the impressive time of 22 minutes. The crew and their 14-year old coxswain, John Magnus, were paraded through the streets and feted as heroes.

Less than a year later, General Lafayette, the French nobleman and naval commander who had intervened decisively in the Revolutionary War fifty years earlier, visited New York City again. After rowing Lafayette to New Jersey and back for a dinner party, the crew of the American Star impulsively offered the boat to him, “in the hope,” John Magnus said, “that you will take it back to France where it may occasionally remind you of your grateful friends that you have left behind, the ingenuity of the mechanics of a country you helped to liberate, and also our great naval motto, ‘Free Trade and Sailors’ Rights.’ “ The American Star resides in France to this day, in a special pavilion on Lafayette's estate.

== Replicas ==
Several replicas of the famous 27' American Star were made over the years since John Gardner had taken measurements of the original in France and built the first one for the Mystic Seaport Museum in 1975. The Salish Star was built in 1998, followed by the Island Star in 2010. Two more replicas–the Bronx Star and the Hudson Star–were finished just in time for the 200 year anniversary of the race by the New York City non-profit boatbuilders Rocking the Boat and the Village Community Boathouse.
