= Orri (given name) =

Given name

Orri is a masculine given name of Icelandic origin. It is used primarily in Icelandic, though variants or similar forms can be found in other cultures. In Old Norse, orri can mean "black grouse" (a bird species common in Northern Europe).

The name is relatively uncommon outside Iceland, but has been borne by several notable individuals in sports, politics, and music.

== Notable people with the name ==
- German-American soccer goalkeeper nicknamed "Orri", see Orest Banach.
- Orri Gunnarsson (born 2003), Icelandic basketball player, member of the Iceland men's national basketball team.
- Orri Páll Dýrason (born 1977), Icelandic musician and former drummer of Sigur Rós.
- Orri Vigfússon (1942–2017), Icelandic entrepreneur and environmentalist known for his work in salmon conservation.
- Orri Óskarsson (born 2004), Icelandic footballer, member of Iceland national football team and Real Sociedad

== See also ==
- Icelandic names
- Sigur Rós
