= Salmon (book) =

2020 book by Mark Kurlansky

Salmon: A Fish, the Earth, and the History of a Common Fate
- Author: Mark Kurlansky
- Language: English
- Genre: History
- Publisher: Oneworld Publications
- Pages: 336
- ISBN: 9781786078520

Salmon: A Fish, the Earth, and the History of a Common Fate is a 2020 non-fiction book, written by Mark Kurlansky and published by Oneworld Publications, about the economic and natural history of salmon. It is a follow-up to Kurlansky's 1997 book, Cod: A Biography of the Fish That Changed the World. The book is dedicated to Icelandic environmentalist Orri Vigfússon.

== Content ==
Salmon presents the history of salmon, both pertaining to its life cycle and presence in the animal food chain, as well as its impact on humans. The book details how salmon has been used across various countries and cultures, including Japan, Colombia, and Scotland, where it has been fished, and used as food and currency. The book also features various recipes to show how salmon has been historically prepared, and how this has changed over time.

Salmon assesses the environmental damage of industrialisation and overfishing, and notes that they have contributed to a reduced population of salmon. Additionally, the book describes how some solutions to these problems, such as the construction of fish hatcheries, are often counterproductive. In Salmon, Kurlansky argues that the Native American method of fishing with spears and weirs is the only sustainable option of fishing for salmon.

== Reception ==
Foreword Reviews called Salmon a "fascinating mosaic of history and science", praising its ability to talk about multiple subjects – "the real beauty of the book is in its subtle transformation of a species often thought of in terms of food into one that needs to be considered with care and even championed. Its historical aspects are not easier to read once these connections are made." Riptidefish called Kurlansky "one of the literary geniuses of our time", and said that Salmon was a "must read for anyone that loves fishing anywhere on the Pacific Coast or beyond for salmon." Similarly, Venturing Angler said that "In Salmon, Kurlansky writes a book that anyone can read because it is a book that everyone ought to read", and praised the book for being easy to understand: "while Kurlansky’s writing leaves no question about his mastery as an academic, he makes the book readable and digestible to all readers". Venturing Angler also noted the book's depth, calling it an "impressively thorough history". Salmon received the 2020 John Avery Award, (part of the Andre Simon Awards), and the silver award for Ecology and Environment by Foreword Reviews.
