= Billion Oyster Project =

Citizen science project

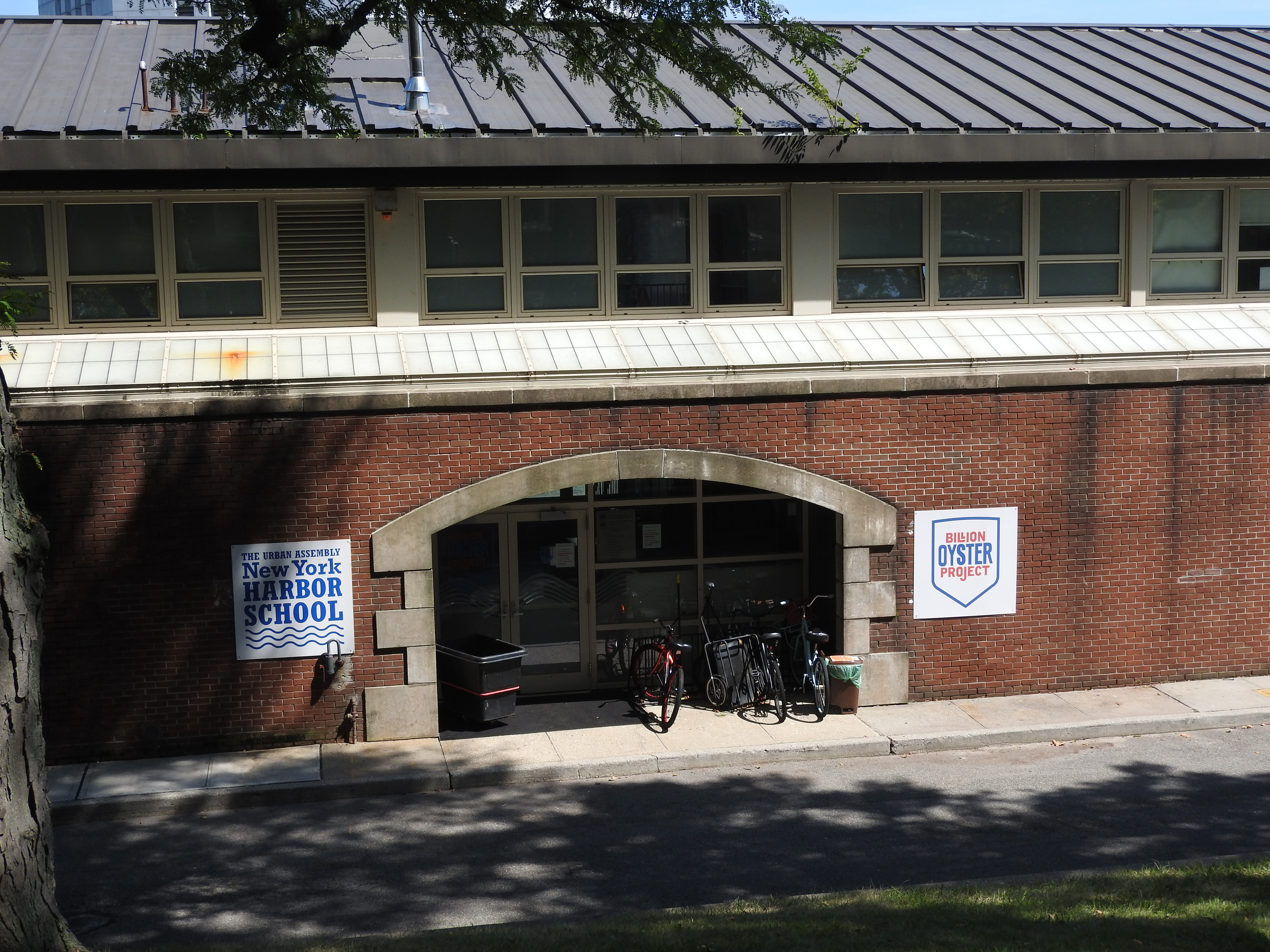
- Formation: 2008; 18 years ago
- Founder: New York Harbor School
- Location: New York, USA
- Key people: Murray Fisher, Peter Malinowski
- Website: billionoysterproject.org

The Billion Oyster Project is a New York City-based nonprofit organization with the goal of engaging one million people in the effort to restore one billion oysters to New York Harbor by 2035. Because oysters are filter feeders, they serve as a natural water filter, with a number of beneficial effects for the ecosystem. The reefs they form increase habitat and subsequent marine biodiversity levels, and help protect the city's shorelines from storm surges.

The Billion Oyster Project believes that engaging community members—especially young people—in reef restoration will lead them to become more environmentally aware in the future. The project aims to engage hundreds of thousands of students, teachers, and community scientists in marine restoration-based STEM educational programming. It involves 80 restaurants in an oyster shell recycling program, which provides the project with shells for building new reefs.

The project grew out of the activities of students at the New York Harbor School, as of 2025 located on Governors Island, who started growing and restoring oysters in New York Harbor in 2008. The school continues to be the project’s main educational partnership, involving students through internships and waterfront experience in seven Career and Technical Education (CTE) programs. Along with Harbor School, the Billion Oyster Project is stationed on Governors Island and the scope of their work is confined to the five boroughs of New York City.

== History ==
Oyster reefs in New York City are thought to have covered more than 220,000 acres (890 km^{2}) of the Hudson River estuary and filtered water, provided habitat for other marine species, and attenuated wave energy, but are now functionally extinct in the Harbor due to overharvesting, dredging, and pollution.

The initiative was the brainchild of Murray Fisher and Pete Malinowski, and grew out of the Urban Assembly New York Harbor School in 2014. A $5 million National Science Foundation grant allowed the program to spread to thousands of public middle school students starting in 2015.

=== Achievements ===
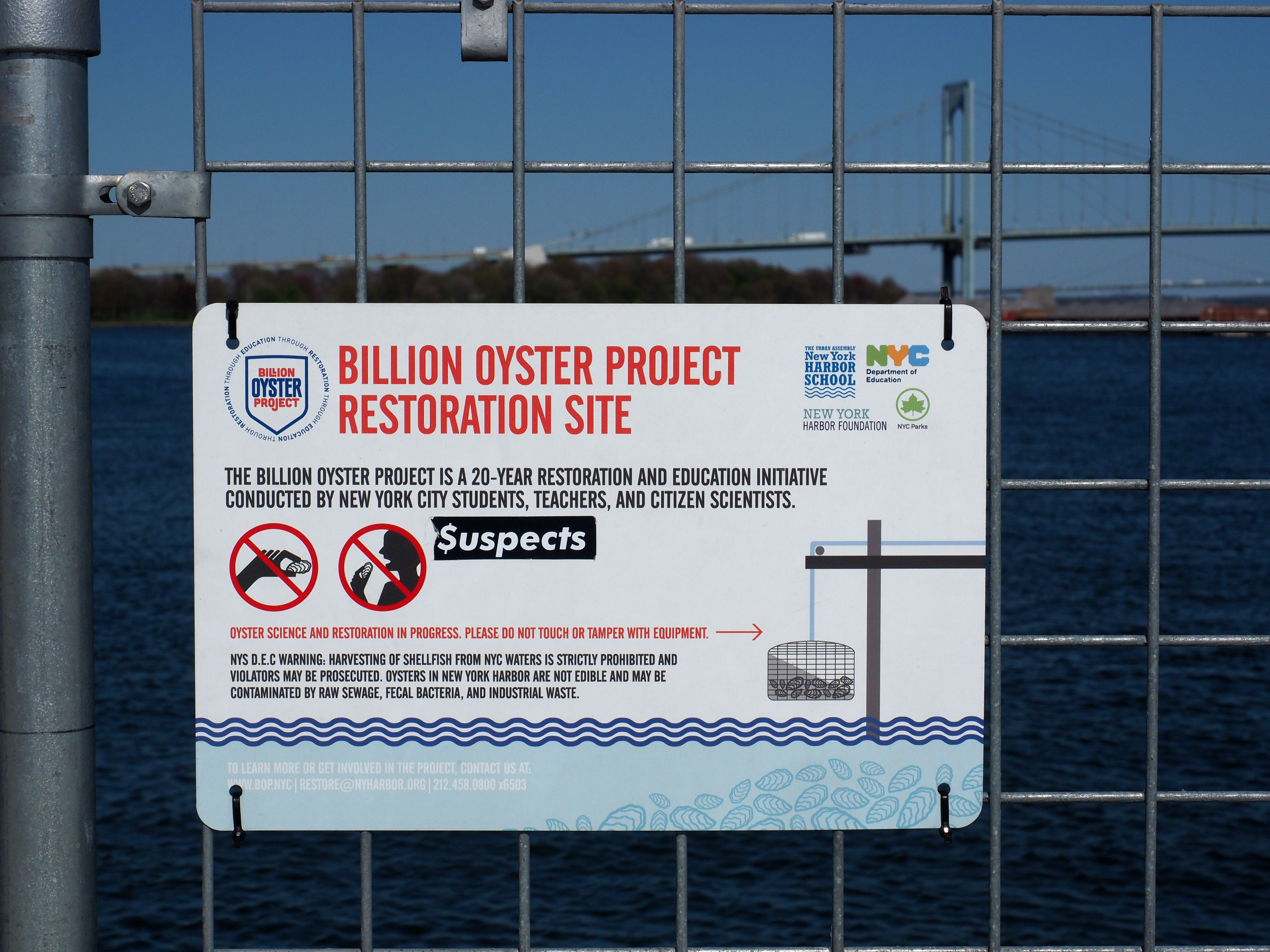
Sign at the Soundview ferry terminal, Bronx, New York, United States. Location is the Bronx side of the East River, approximately 1 mile west of the Whitestone Bridge (visible in background).

As of December 2025, more than 150 million oysters had been restored to New York Harbor, with 17 acres (69,000 m^{2}) of reef area restored. More than 11,000 high-school and middle-school students have taken part in the project. Approximately 2,000,000 pounds (910 metric tons) of oyster shell have been recycled. In 2020, expansion into mobile spawning tanks at Red Hook, Brooklyn, allowed for significant increases in capacity.

== Projects ==
=== Living Breakwaters ===
Living Breakwaters is a project overseen by the Billion Oyster Project in Staten Island intended to reintroduce oysters while also protecting against storm surge, increasing biodiversity, improving water quality, and creating educational opportunities. This project is funded in part by the United States Department of Housing and Urban Development, which contributed $60 million partly for the purpose of disaster recovery from Hurricane Sandy, but also to prevent similar disasters in the future. Staten Island was greatly affected by erosion and flooding from the 2012 storm, particularly along the south shore.

The project started in Tottenville, a neighborhood once famous for its oyster population. As part of the strategy, discarded oyster shells from over 70 New York restaurants are collected and left outside for a year to be naturally cleansed of organic matter. Baby oysters are then placed on the shells by students at New York Harbor School, a maritime-focused public high school located on Governors Island. The oyster larvae are of the currently existing population, rather than introducing those of other populations, which runs the risk of also introducing invasive species. The oysters will be placed onto several walls in the water made of low-acidity permeable concrete.

The oysters on the walls will create 13,000 feet (4,000 m) of natural breakwaters one-quarter mile (0.40 km) off the shore of Tottenville as part of a risk-management effort against climate change, in light of an expected rise in both storm frequency and sea levels. The oysters are intended to naturally filter the water, making it more attractive to marine life and thus restoring biodiversity. The construction of the project is an opportunity for local classrooms and the community to get involved and see marine biology in action. The Living Breakwaters citizens advisory committee was established in 2015 and looks to gather opinions of the locals on decisions through the project. Project construction was originally planned to start in late 2019, but ultimately began in 2021.
