= American Star =

American Star may refer to:

- SS American Star, a mid-20th century ocean liner originally named the SS America
- American Star (ship), a small cruise ship launched in 2007
- American Star Bicycle, a brand
- American Star (film), a 2024 thriller film
- American Star (novel), a 1993 romance novel by Jackie Collins
- "American Star", a 2010 song by Lil Wayne from the album Rebirth
- American Star (rowing boat), a historic gig donated to General Lafayette in 1824
