= Modern Library Chronicles =

Series of short books

The Modern Library Chronicles are a series of short books published by the American publisher, Modern Library. Most of the books are under 150 pages in length and intended to introduce readers to a period of history.

A partial list includes:

1. The Renaissance, by Paul Johnson
2. Islam: A Short History, by Karen Armstrong
3. The Balkans, by Mark Mazower
4. The German Empire: 1870-1918, by Michael Stürmer
5. Küng, Hans (2001). The Catholic Church: A Short History. New York. ISBN 0-679-64092-4., by Hans Küng
6. Peoples and Empires, by Anthony Pagden
7. Communism, by Richard Pipes
8. Hitler and the Holocaust, by Robert S. Wistrich
9. The American Revolution, by Gordon S. Wood
10. Law in America, by Lawrence Friedman
11. Inventing Japan: 1853-1964, by Ian Buruma
12. The Company: A Short History of a Revolutionary Idea, by John Micklethwait and Adrian Wooldridge
13. The Americas: A Hemispheric History, by Felipe Fernandez-Armesto
14. The Boys' Crusade, by Paul Fussell
15. The Age of Shakespeare, by Frank Kermode
16. The Age of Napoleon, by Alistair Horne
17. Evolution: The Remarkable History of a Scientific Theory, by Edward J. Larson
18. London: A History, by A.N. Wilson
19. The Reformation: A History, by Patrick Collinson
20. Nazism and War, by Richard Bessel
21. The City, by Joel Kotkin
22. Infinite Ascent: A Short History of Mathematics, by David Berlinski
23. California: A History, by Kevin Starr
24. Storm from the East: The Struggle Between the Arab World and the Christian West, by Milton Viorst
25. Baseball: A History of America's Favorite Game, by George Vecsey
26. Nonviolence: Twenty-five Lessons from the History of a Dangerous Idea by Mark Kurlansky
27. The Hellenistic Age: A Short History, by Peter Green
28. A Short History of Medicine, by F. Gonzalez-Crussi
29. The Christian World, by Martin Marty
30. Prehistory, by Colin Renfrew
31. Dangerous Games: The Uses and Abuses of History, by Margaret MacMillan
32. Uncivil Society: 1989 and the Implosion of the Communist Establishment, by Stephen Kotkin
33. The Korean War: A History, by Bruce Cummings
34. The Romantic Revolution: A History, by Tim Blanning
