= Wherry =

English river/canal boat

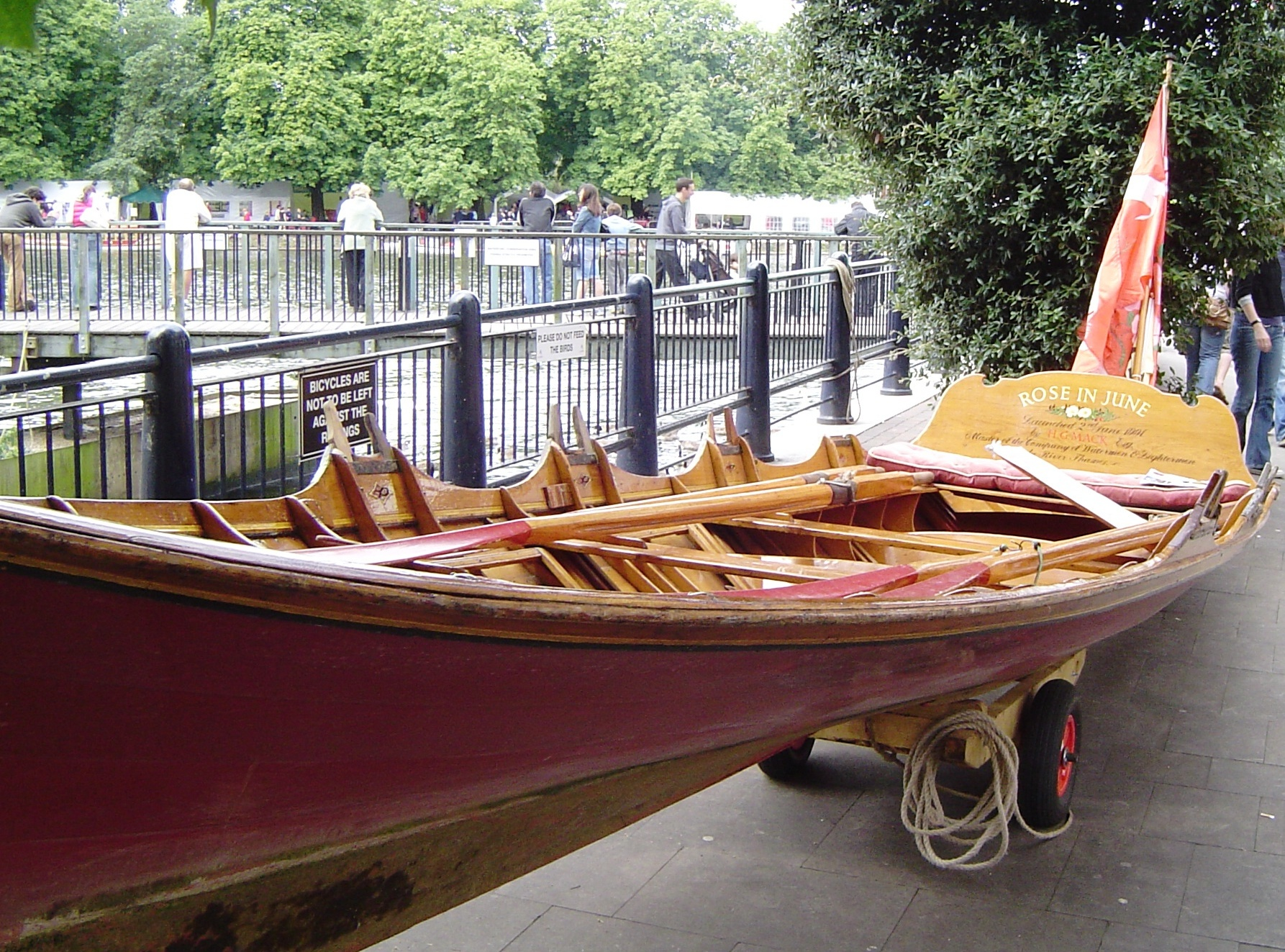
Thames wherry built to 18th-century design at Kingston upon Thames

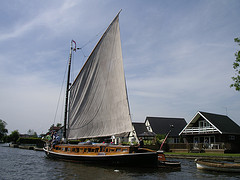
A Norfolk wherry on the River Bure.

A wherry is a type of boat that was traditionally used for carrying cargo or passengers on rivers and canals in England, and is particularly associated with the River Thames, the River Cam and the Broadland rivers of Norfolk and Suffolk.

== Regional usage in Great Britain ==
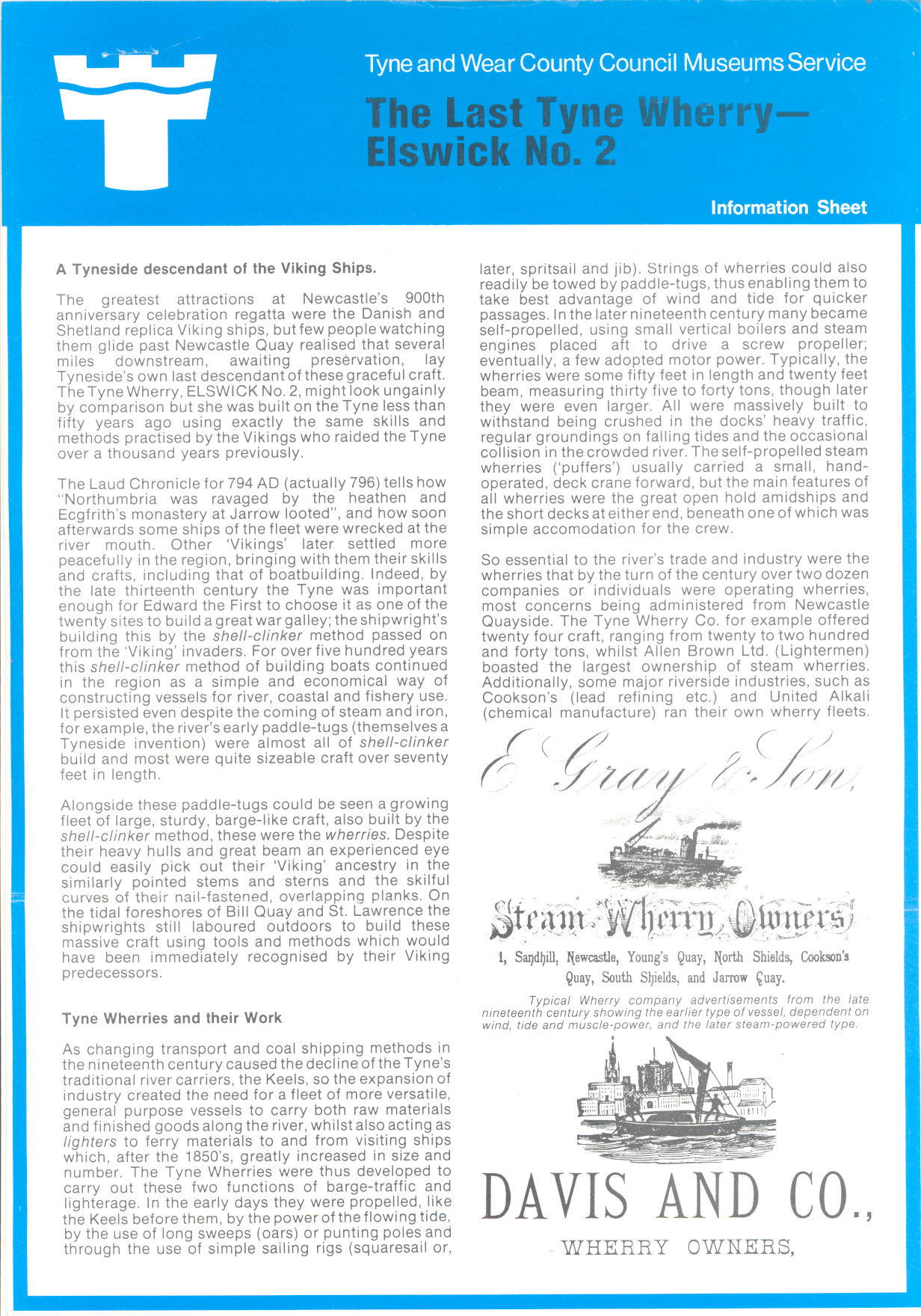
Tyne Wherry information sheet from Tyne & Wear Archives & Museums collections

London passenger wherries evolved into the Thames skiff, a gentleman's rowing boat. Wherries were clinker-built with long overhanging bows so that patrons could step ashore dryshod before landing stages were built along the river. It is the long angled bow that distinguishes the wherry and skiff from the gig and cutter which have steeper bows following the rise of the Royal Navy, and the building of landing stages.

The use of wherries on the River Cam in Cambridge was common and is described by Daniel Defoe in his journey through England. The use of wherries on the River Cam preceded the popularity of punting by Cambridge University students. By the late 18th century, a name was given to the Norfolk wherry, a kind of sailing barge with large sails which was developed to replace an earlier cargo boat, the Norfolk Keel.

The term wherry is also associated with a particular type of lighter used on the River Tyne largely in connection with the coal trade. The last complete example Elswick No. 2 is owned by Tyne & Wear Archives & Museums service. There is a well documented study of the last surviving wrecked examples as surveyed in 2009.

There is firm attestation that the term was used in the Irish Sea. Vessels like "Manx wherries" and "shell wherries" (the latter evidently based in Kirkcudbright for the shell fishery) are recorded in the early 19th century. Three shell wherries at least were active in 1810 and known to be of 10–12 tons and clinker built.

== Regional usage in Ireland ==
Wherries were used by the fishermen of Skerries and other ports of the Irish sea north of Dublin in the 18th and 19th century. These wherries generally had two or three masts with a mainsail on the aft mast, and a foresail on the forward mast. Due to the lower height of the rig, they were more manageable in strong winds. The east coast Wherries from Rush, Skerries and Balbriggan were famously decked, clincher built, and schooner rigged. Many of them travelled as far as Scotland and some were even employed in the smuggling trade.By 1866 they had been replaced by more efficient boats of carvel construction.

== Thames history ==
The term "wherry" or "wherrie" was a regular term used for a boat as the Coverdale Bible of 1535 speaks of "All whirry men, and all maryners vpo the see..." in the Book of Ezekiel.

Wherries along the tideway in London were water taxis operated by watermen and in Elizabethan times their use was widespread. A wherry could be rowed by two men with long oars or by a single waterman using short oars or 'sculls'. An Act of Parliament in 1555 specified that a wherry should be "22 1/2 feet long and 4 1/2 wide 'amidships'" (6.9 by 1.4 m). and could carry up to five passengers. During Shakespeare's time, patrons often crossed the River Thames to Southwark's theatre district, including the Globe Theatre, using 'wherry boats' operated by watermen. Estimates suggest that around 3,000 such boats were in operation, providing transportation including to the theatre district.

During the eighteenth century rowing competitions for watermen became established on the Thames, and the prize was often a new wherry. The Sporting Magazine describes an event on 6 August 1795 as "the contest for the annual wherry given by the Proprietors of Vauxhall by six pairs of oars in three heats". In 1822 Bell's Life reported on a contest on 30 June between eight watermen belonging to the Temple Stairs for "a prize wherry given by the gentlemen of the Inns of Court" and on 31 July "the anniversary of the Grand Aquatic Regatta of the inhabitants of Queenhithe", when "a handsome Wherry" and other prizes were contended for by "six of the free watermen belonging to those stairs". In 1820 there were still 3,000 wherries plying on the Thames, while in the same year there were only 1,200 hackney coaches. As late as 1829, the usual means of crossing the river from Westminster to Vauxhall was by boat, but the wherryman's trade came to an end when new bridges were built and cheap steamboats were put on the river.

== North American usage ==
In North America, particularly in the Penobscot Bay region of the Gulf of Maine, wherries became the preferred boat for the longshore Atlantic salmon fishery. The Lincolnville Salmon Wherry, the Rhodes Wherry, the Duck Trap Wherry, and the Christmas Wherry are still being built for recreational use. They are generally long and narrow, with a straight stem, a wineglass stern and usually carvel planked (smooth sides). John Gardner writes that the single characteristic that distinguishes a wherry is its flat bottom that allows the boat to ground out in an upright position and serves as a shoe for dragging the boat up and down the beach. The boat usually has two seats, one for the rower, and one in the stern sheets for the passenger, although longer ones can have a third seat forward. The term "shell wherry" was recognised in 19th-century America.

== See also ==
- Norfolk wherry
