= Mike Davis (boat builder) =

American boat builder and advocate (1939–2008)

Mike Davis (December 6, 1939 – November 3, 2008) was a boat builder who was a hands-on advocate for making recreational boat usage available on the Hudson River from New York City and New Jersey.

Michael Kincaid Davis was born in Baltimore on December 6, 1939. He was one of three children. While his father was a captain in the United States Coast Guard, it was his experience as an anthropologist and archeologist that triggered his nautical interests. He graduated from Beloit College in 1964 and was awarded a master's degree at the University of Oklahoma in anthropology. He worked with archeological teams from the University of Chicago, and spent several years working on an archeological dig in Turkey at Diyarbakır, near the Euphrates River. The dig was interrupted by guerrilla activity. After spending time in Istanbul and seeing how individuals could easily rent a boat and take it out rowing on the Bosporus, he came to the conclusion that the same thing should be available on the Hudson River. Davis noted that "as late as 1933 there were 41 boathouses in Manhattan, while now there is just one."

After reading articles in boating journals, Davis created an organization called Floating the Apple in March 1994 to help provide boating opportunities on the Hudson River. With financial assistance from the Open Space Institute, Davis decided that the group should build boats and make them available for public use. A design was developed for a boat that could accommodate ten passengers, and the boats were constructed using donated tools in space made available to Davis by the 42d Street Development Corporation. The boats that Davis constructed were Whitehall gigs, a longer version of the traditional Whitehall Rowboat that dates back to a 250-year-old design that was the type of boat George Washington used to get his troops across the East River during the Battle of Long Island.

As of 2008, Floating the Apple was located at Pier 84 in Hudson River Park. Other spinoff groups, such as the Village Community Boathouse, are now located at Pier 40, the East River Crew on East 96th Street, Rocking the Boat in the South Bronx, in Weehawken, New Jersey and at five other locations north of New York City.

Davis was a resident of Manhattan and died at age 68 on November 3, 2008. The cause of death was not immediately determined.
