= Whitehall rowboat =

American lapstrake-built rowboat

A Whitehall rowboat

A Whitehall rowboat is a style of lapstrake-built rowboat developed in the United States in the 19th century. The basic design is much older and of European ancestry. It strongly resembles a sailing ship's gig or a Thames river wherry used by watermen as a taxi service. They were first made in the U.S. at the foot of Whitehall Street in New York City to ferry goods, and people to ships in New York Harbor.

The boats range from 14 to 22 ft in length, the larger requiring two people to row them. The 25 ft Whitehall gig requires four rowers and a coxswain for a crew of five.

== History ==
The Whitehall rowboat was the first boat to be constructed in an inverted-hull set-up to speed up the manufacturing process.

The hull shape is characterized by a nearly straight stem, and slight flare to the bow, rounded sides, with a keel running the entire length of the bottom and a distinctive wine glass transom with a full skeg. Speed was the issue with these boats, as the first to the ship with the goods generally received most of the sales. Later the shore patrol used these boats for customs, police issues, water taxi, and newspaper reporting.

Whitehalls in the early 20th century were a popular recreational boat and were known as the "bicycle of the sea". A beginning rower finds it easier to row this design in a straight line because of the tracking type keel. Turning requires stronger strokes on one side, and by braking with one oar and pulling with the other the boat can be turned in its own length.

== Today ==
Whitehall designs are currently being built in wood, and also manufactured fiberglass usually with wood trims, and more recently thermoformed in co-polymer plastic. These boats are either traditional fixed seat row boats or slide seat rowing boats. Some models or also including sailing rigs. Many designs are mistakenly being called Whitehalls when they are not actually true to the design criteria. The Mystic Seaport Maritime Museum has a comprehensive collection of authentic Whitehall lines.

The Village Community Boathouse in New York City has dedicated its boatbuilding program to almost exclusively building and restoring wooden Whitehall Gigs. They have built dozens over the last decade, most of which are available for free public use at their boathouse on Pier 40 while others have been loaned or donated to sister organizations.

== See also ==
- Watercraft rowing
