= Nonviolence: The History of a Dangerous Idea =

2006 book by Mark Kurlansky

- First edition
- Author: Mark Kurlansky
- Language: English
- Genre: Non-Fiction
- Publisher: Modern Library Chronicles, division of Random House
- Publication date: 2006
- Media type: Print
- ISBN: 0-679-64335-4

Nonviolence: The History of a Dangerous Idea, first published as Nonviolence: Twenty-Five Lessons from the History of a Dangerous Idea, is a book by Mark Kurlansky. It follows the history of nonviolence and nonviolent activism, focusing on religious and political ideals from early history to the present.

== The Τwenty-Five Lessons ==
Kurlansky summarizes the Twenty-Five Lessons as follows:

1. There is no proactive word for nonviolence [in English].
2. Nations that build military forces as deterrents will eventually use them.
3. Practitioners of nonviolence are seen as enemies of the state.
4. Once a state takes over a religion, the religion loses its nonviolent teachings.
5. A rebel can be defanged and co-opted by making him a saint after he is dead.
6. Somewhere behind every war there are always a few founding lies.
7. A propaganda machine promoting hatred always has a war waiting in the wings.
8. People who go to war start to resemble their enemy.
9. A conflict between a violent and a nonviolent force is a moral argument. If the violent side can provoke the nonviolent side into violence, the violent side has won.
10. The problem lies not in the nature of man, but in the nature of power.
11. The longer a war lasts, the less popular it becomes.
12. The state imagines it is impotent without a military because it can not conceive of power without force.
13. It is often not the largest, but the best organized and most articulate group that prevails.
14. All debate momentarily ends with an enforced silence once the first shots are fired.
15. A shooting war is not necessary to overthrow an established power, but is used to consolidate the revolution itself.
16. Violence does not resolve; it always leads to more violence.
17. Warfare produces peace activists. A group of veterans is a likely place to find peace activists.
18. People motivated by fear do not act well.
19. While it is perfectly feasible to convince a people faced with brutal oppression to rise up in a suicidal attack on their oppressor, it is almost impossible to convince them to meet deadly violence with nonviolent resistance.
20. Wars do not have to be sold to the general public if they can be carried out by an all-volunteer professional military.
21. Once you start the business of killing, you just get deeper and deeper without limits.
22. Violence always comes with a supposedly rational explanation, which is only dismissed as irrational if the violence fails.
23. Violence is a virus that infects and takes over.
24. The miracle is that despite all of society's promotion of warfare, most soldiers find warfare to be a wrenching departure from their own moral values.
25. The hard work of beginning a movement to end war has already been done.

== Awards ==
This book was the 2007 non-fiction winner of the Dayton Literary Peace Prize.
