= Thomas Downing (restaurateur) =

American restaurateur and abolitionist (1791–1866)

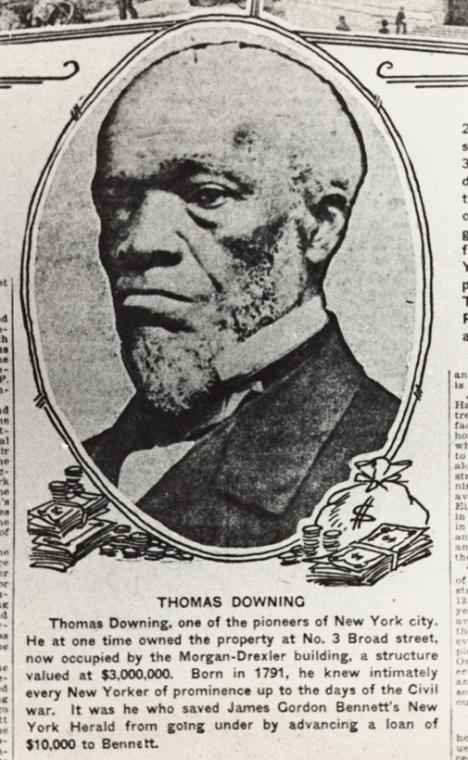
An illustration of Thomas Downing from a newspaper clipping

Thomas George Downing (January 27, 1791 – 1866) was an American restaurateur and abolitionist active in New York City during the Victorian era. He was nicknamed the "New York Oyster King". He was one of the wealthiest people in New York City at the time of his death. He spent his life prohibited from acquiring U.S. citizenship, until the Civil Rights Act of 1866 was passed, the day before he died.

== Early family life ==
Thomas Downing was born on Chincoteague Island, Virginia. His parents were owned, but eventually freed, by Sea Captain John Downing after learning that owning slaves was not condoned by the Methodist Church. They adopted the name "Downing" as their own and began working as paid caretakers of Captain Downing's Methodist Meeting House.

Eventually, they bought some property on the Island and the family began earning extra money by gathering and selling oysters, as well as other seafood, such as clams and fish. Thomas was raised alongside his wealthy neighbors and shared the same tutor as their children. One of his tutors was Henry A. Wise, who went on to become the Governor of Virginia (1861–1865).

At the end of the War of 1812, Thomas joined the United States Army and followed it to Philadelphia. There he met and married his wife, freeborn Rebecca West. They had five children: George, Thomas, Henry, Jane, and Peter. Thomas worked as a valet, continued oystering, and, wanting more out of life than oyster digging, he eventually opened his first oyster bar. This allowed him to keep ties with his family's roots while establishing his new career as an esteemed businessman. Thomas used his knowledge of oystering to his advantage and used his connections to the fisherman to sell the best oysters around.

== Career ==
Thomas moved to New York City where, in 1820, he continued as an oysterman, selling his oysters on the street. At the time, oysters were inexpensive and considered common food. Thomas was an innovative businessman who knew how to set his oyster sales apart from the rest. One of the tactics he used to keep a competitive edge was purchasing the best oysters from the captains before any of the other oyster caterers arrived for the auction. When the others showed up to bid on the day's catch, he would pay the favor back to the captains by placing bids on the oysters with no intention of winning them, just to bump up the bidding price among the rest of Thomas's competitors.

Another tactic he used was catering to the rich and elite of New York City. When Downing opened the Thomas Downing Oyster House in 1825, it was considered upscale compared to any of the other oyster cellars at that time. By using expensive linens and decorating with fine dining ware and chandeliers, he created an atmosphere that was both welcoming and comfortable for his rich clientele. His restaurant was strategically placed in the heart of New York's Business District.

The 5 Points area, an African-American neighborhood a few blocks away from 5 Broad Street where the Thomas Downing Oyster House was located, housed many oyster cellars. The competition at the time were known to be dive bars and paled in comparison to the lavish food that was served at the Thomas Downing Oyster House. His menu raised the bar for oysters in fine dining. Some of the dishes he served included roast turkey stuffed with oysters, boned and jellied turkey, creamy oyster stew, pan fried oysters, roast duck and ham, scalloped oysters, and oyster pie. Aside from being more upscale, Thomas's oyster bar was unique because women and children were encouraged by Thomas to dine there, as long as they were accompanied by their husbands or fathers. This was unusual, as the only females that were generally allowed entry to oyster cellars at that time were prostitutes.

By 1835, Downing expanded his business to 3 and 7 Broad Street. He further innovated by adding catering and mail-order options to his restaurant. During the height of its success in 1842, Thomas's catering business was chosen by the City of New York to cater for the Boz Ball, an event which welcomed famous British author Charles Dickens to America. Internationally known, Thomas would ship his Oysters pickled, fried, or live to customers far and wide.

One of the most notable recipients was Queen Victoria. The queen enjoyed her oysters so much, that she wrote Thomas a letter thanking him, and gifted him a gold chronometer watch, which became a Downing family heirloom. As Queen Victoria never travelled outside Europe, this story may not in fact be true. When Thomas died in 1866, his son George continued to run the restaurant until 1871. In 1910, the oyster population in New York had declined due to overfishing and pollution. By 1927, the last New York oyster bed was shut down, as a result of untreated sewage being dumped into the New York City water every day.

== Contributions as an abolitionist ==
In addition to his success in oyster sales, Thomas Downing was known for his role as an abolitionist during the American civil rights movement of the 1860s. As a founding member of the community group The Committee of the Thirteen, he helped protect free African-Americans from being kidnapped and sold back into slavery. His restaurant was used as a stop on the Underground Railroad. Downing allowed run-away slaves to hide there while they travelled North to safety.

In addition to wanting to establish the first upscale oyster cellar, Thomas wanted to use the opportunity that the wealth and power he gained with his success in business to help the black community. The restaurant's clientele consisted mainly of wealthy white people, who were most likely unaware that the money that they used to pay for their meals were helping fund the escape of enslaved African-Americans.

== See also ==
- Oysters in New York City
