= Oysters in New York City =

Regional aspect

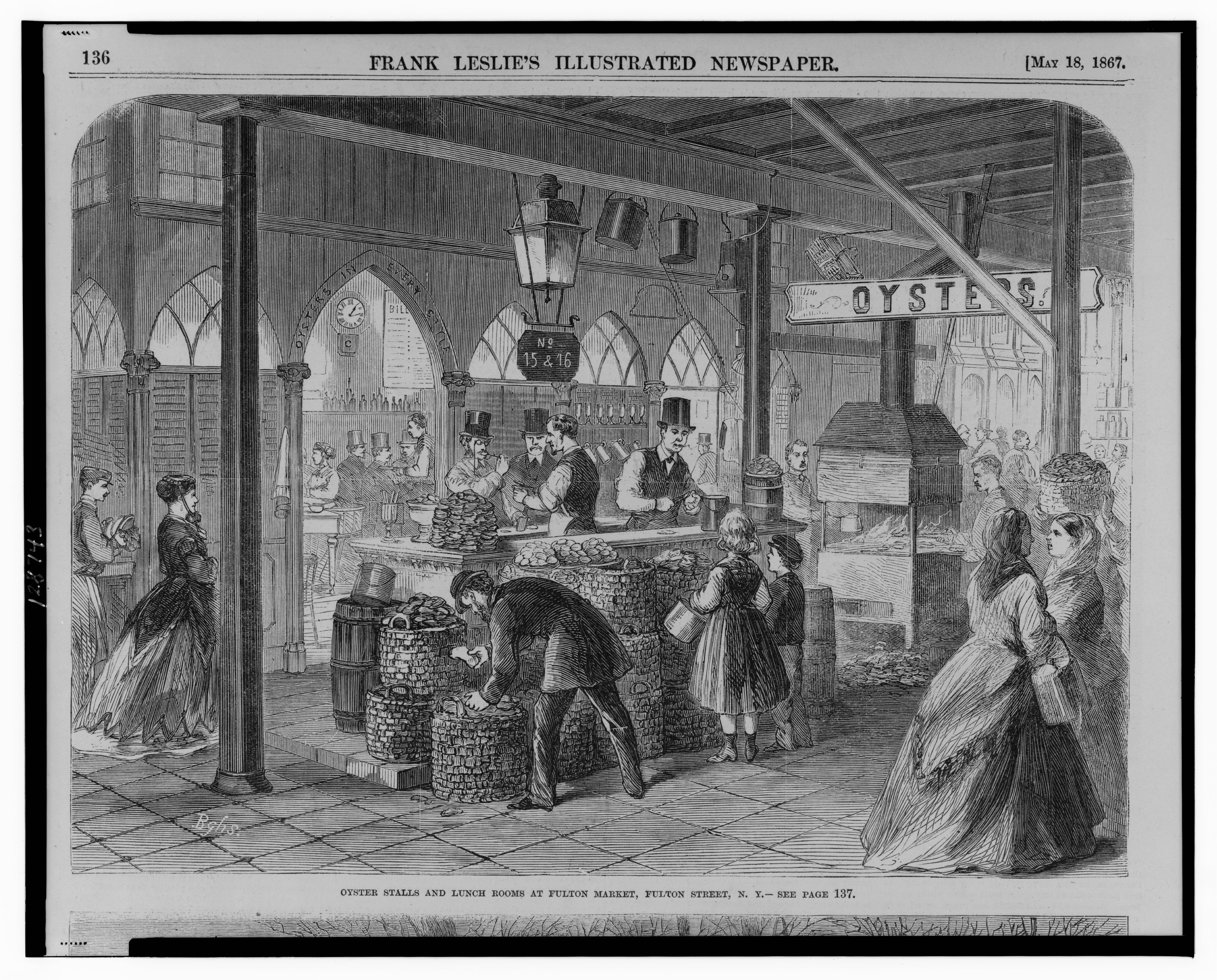
"Oyster stalls and lunch room at Fulton Market", 1867

Oysters in New York City have a long history as part of both the environmental and cultural environment. They were abundant in the marine life of New York–New Jersey Harbor Estuary, functioning as water filtration and as a food source beginning with Native communities in Lenapehoking. The "Oyster Islands" of Upper New York Bay were Ellis, Liberty and Black Tom.

In colonial New York, oysters were sold on the street, and also pickled and exported to other colonies, and the Caribbean. These pickled oysters were typically seasoned with nutmeg and black pepper.

== Industrial history ==
The oyster's local history is documented in the 2006 book The Big Oyster: History on the Half Shell, focusing on the height of the oyster harvesting and restaurant industry in the 19th century. A leading restaurateur of the early 19th century was African American Thomas Downing.

City Island, Bronx was a major source of harvesting among other places, but severe overfishing led to devastation of the oyster population. By 1916, most of the five borough's oyster beds had been closed. New York lost its status as an oyster capital in 1927 when its final remaining local oyster beds closed.

== Modern era ==
=== Restaurants ===
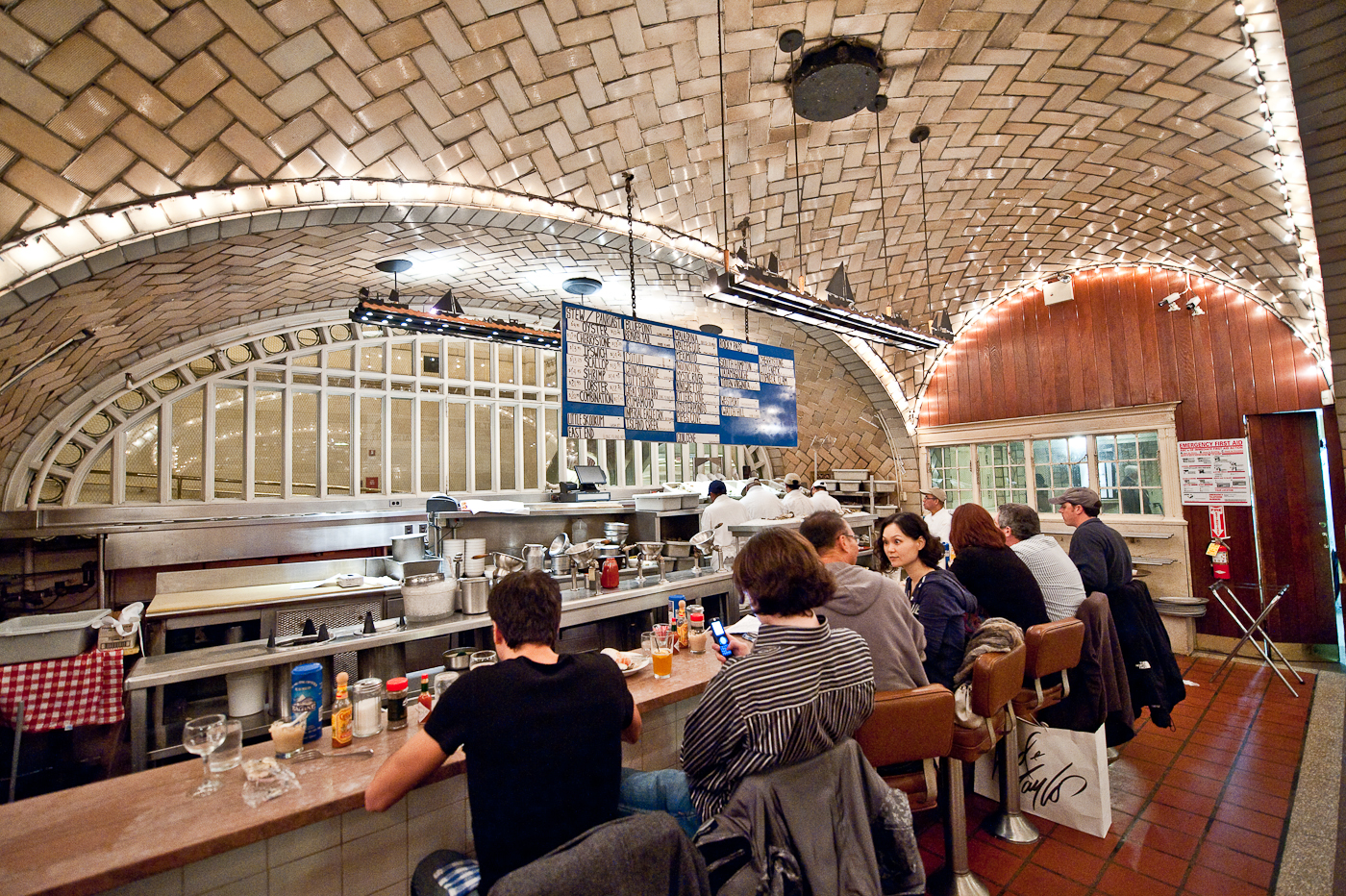
The lunch counter at the Grand Central Oyster Bar in Grand Central Terminal.

The most famous oyster bar in New York City is the Grand Central Oyster Bar. Opened in February 1913, the 440-seat eatery was popular among travelers making their way to and from the city. It originally operated until 1972 when the original location declared bankruptcy and closed. In 1974, the MTA had the approached restaurateur Jerome Brody to reopen the original location, bringing the restaurant - and oysters - back to Grand Central Station. The location remains open today, even despite COVID-19 closures and restrictions, and undergone many restorations and remodels.

Another historical oyster restaurant was the Downing's Oyster House, owned and operated by Thomas Downing. Downing, the child of former slaves from Virginia, moved to New York City in 1820 after being discharged from the Army following the War of 1812 and opened the Thomas Downing Oyster House in 1825. He would go on to be one of the richest men in New York, nicknamed the "Oyster King," operating not only the restaurant, but a catering, take out, and international mail order business all centered around locally harvested oysters.

A notable contemporary oyster bar is Maison Premiere in Williamsburg, Brooklyn, opened in 2011 and recognized for its extensive absinthe program and oyster selection.

== Restoration projects ==
=== Billion Oyster Project ===
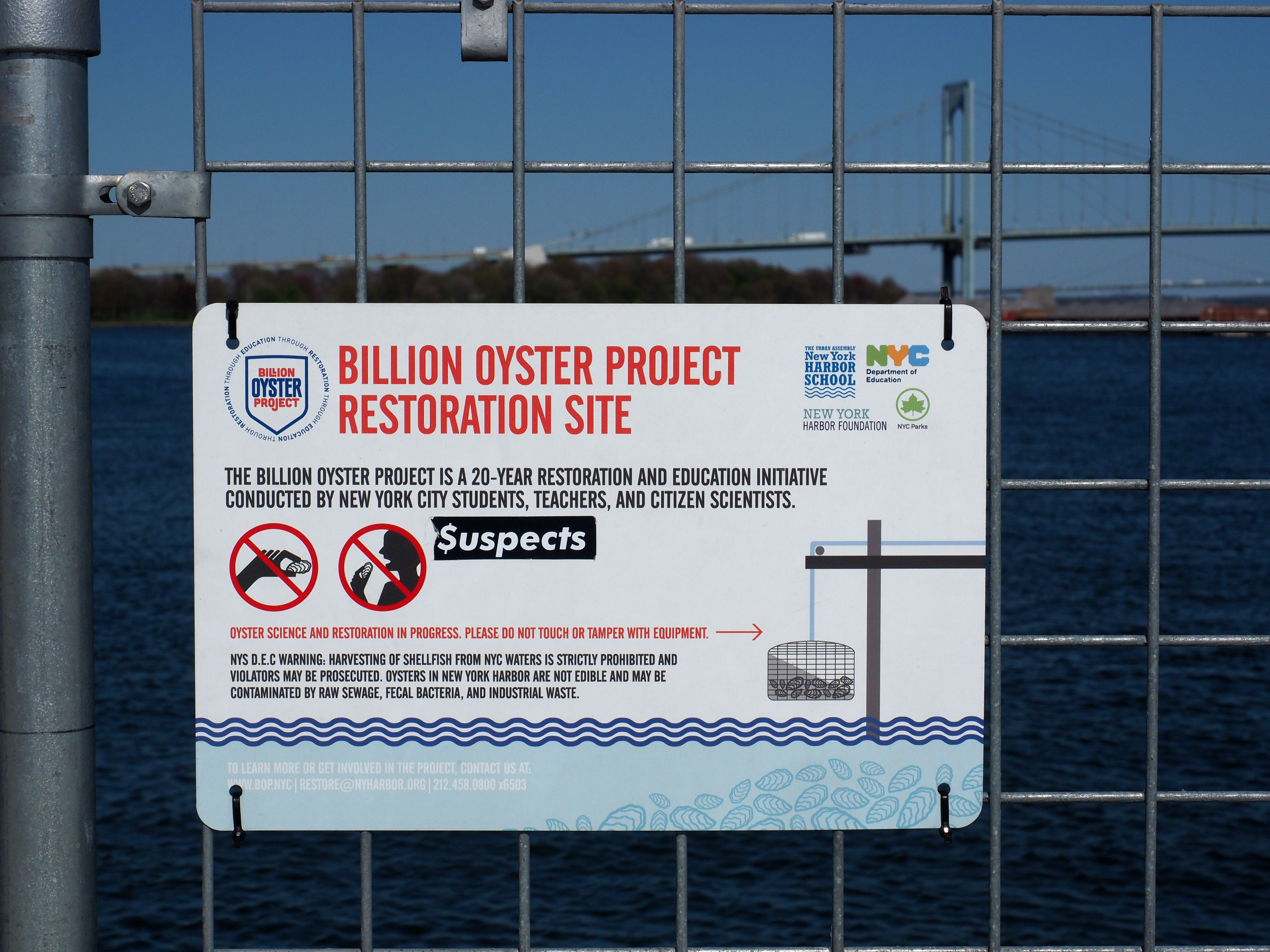
Sign advertising the Project at a ferry terminal the Bronx, New York

Started in 1994 by Murray Fisher and Pete Malinowski, the Billion Oyster Project set to return oysters back to New York Harbor. The program was designed to, at first, use artificial reefs to let young oysters - or spat - attach to and grow. In 2015, the Project started the Shell Collection Program, collecting used shells from oyster, clams, and scallops donated by restaurants in New York City. The shells provide hard surface and are rich in calcium carbonate, a perfect environment for the baby oysters to grow.

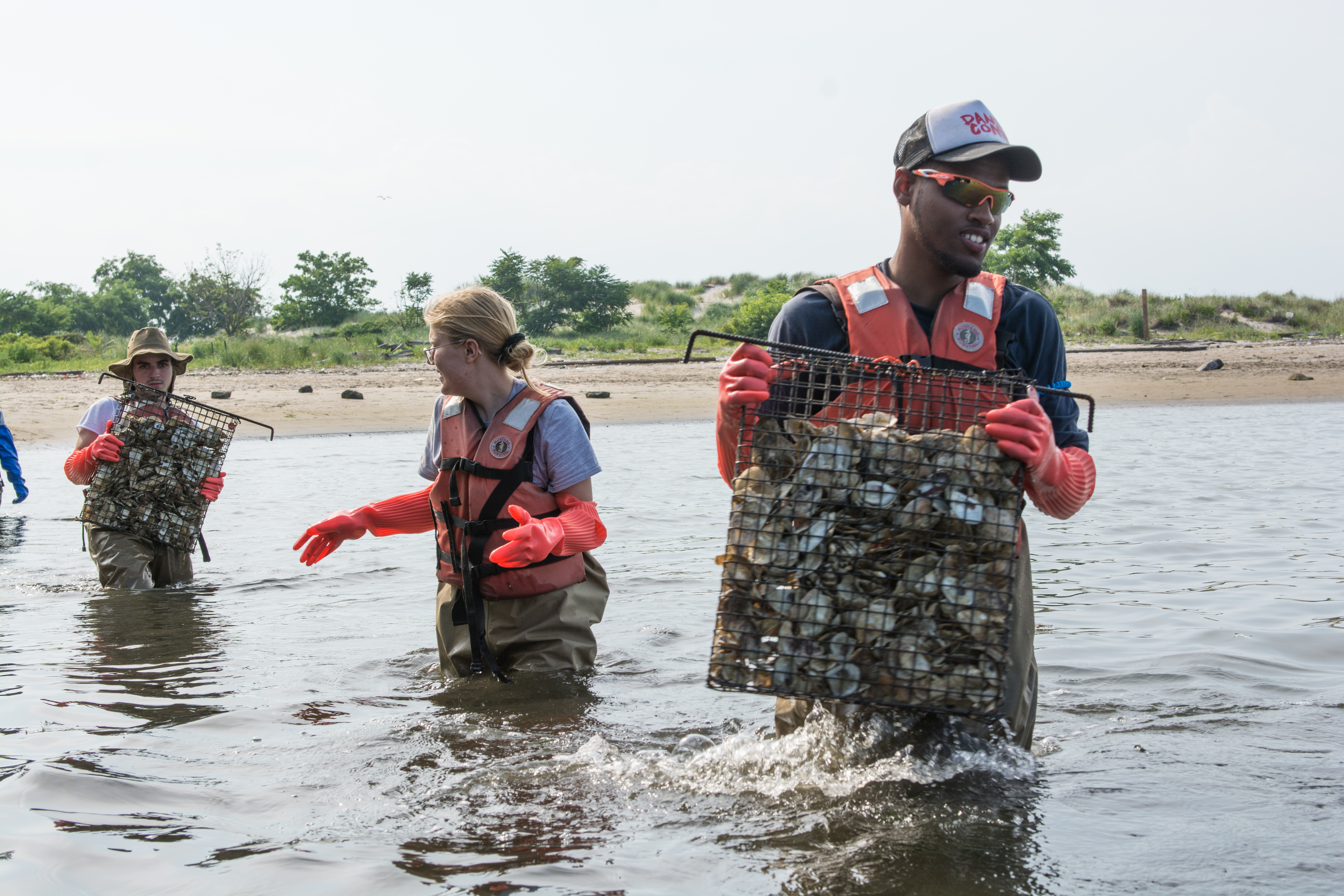
Community oyster reef installation in Coney Island Creek, Brooklyn.

The Project has fifteen locations around the Five Boroughs where they've established “field stations" where the Project or partner organizations bring in students or community programs to educate the public about their efforts. Locations include Bayswater Point State Park, Brooklyn Bridge Park, Governors Island, and Soundview Reefs at the mouth of the Bronx River. They also have restoration sites at Lemon Creek Park, Mario Cuomo Bridge, and SUNY Maritime College.

=== City Island Oyster Reef Project ===
City Island Oyster Reef is conducting a similar effort in the western Long Island Sound near City Island. City Island Oyster Reef is attempting to restore the oyster population, not for consumption but to improve harbor water quality. Edible oysters will not be available for about a century.
