= The Big Oyster: History on the Half Shell =

2006 book by Mark Kurlansky

- Author: Mark Kurlansky
- Language: English
- Genre: Non-Fiction
- Publisher: Penguin Group
- Publication date: 2006
- Media type: Print (Hardback and Paperback)
- ISBN: 0-345-47638-7
- OCLC: 60550567
- Dewey Decimal: 641.6/94 22
- LC Class: TX754.O98 K87 2006

The Big Oyster: History on the Half Shell is a book by Mark Kurlansky. It follows the history of New York City and the renowned oyster beds in the New York–New Jersey Harbor Estuary. The subject of the book is the history of oysters in New York City.

== Errors ==
- The book states that "an Oyster has a brain", but they do not. (pp. 50).
- George Washington never had children, but the book states Philip, the son of Washington, was put in charge of redistributing Loyalist-held properties in New York City after the Revolutionary War (pp. 92).
- The book states that Robert Fulton invented the submarine (p. 98), but this statement distorts the history of submarines; various people had envisioned submarines in earlier eras, and a few had been built (such as the Turtle).
- The book states that the 3477 deaths at the Battle of Shiloh during the Civil War was almost equal to the number who died in all eight years of the Revolutionary War (pp. 201). However about 8000 American Revolutionaries died in battle, with 25,000 dead from all causes over the course of that war.
