= Islam: A Short History =

Non-fiction book by Karen Armstrong

- Cover
- Author: Karen Armstrong
- Subject: History of Islam
- Publisher: Modern Library Chronicles
- Publication date: 2000
- Publication place: United Kingdom
- Media type: Print
- Pages: 272
- ISBN: 0-8129-6618-X
- Followed by: The Battle for God

Islam: A Short History is a 2000 book by the British writer Karen Armstrong, a former Roman Catholic nun and author of popular books about the history of religion. Armstrong condemns the West for being prejudiced about Islam since the Crusades, yet writing about present-day Muslims. Armstrong says that when they look at Western society, "they see no light, no heart, no spirituality." She writes in the preface, on Muslims:

Their chief duty was to create a just community in which all members, even the most weak and vulnerable, were treated with absolute respect. The experience of building such a society and living in it would give them intimations of the divine, because they would be living in accordance with God’s will.
