= Village Community Boathouse =

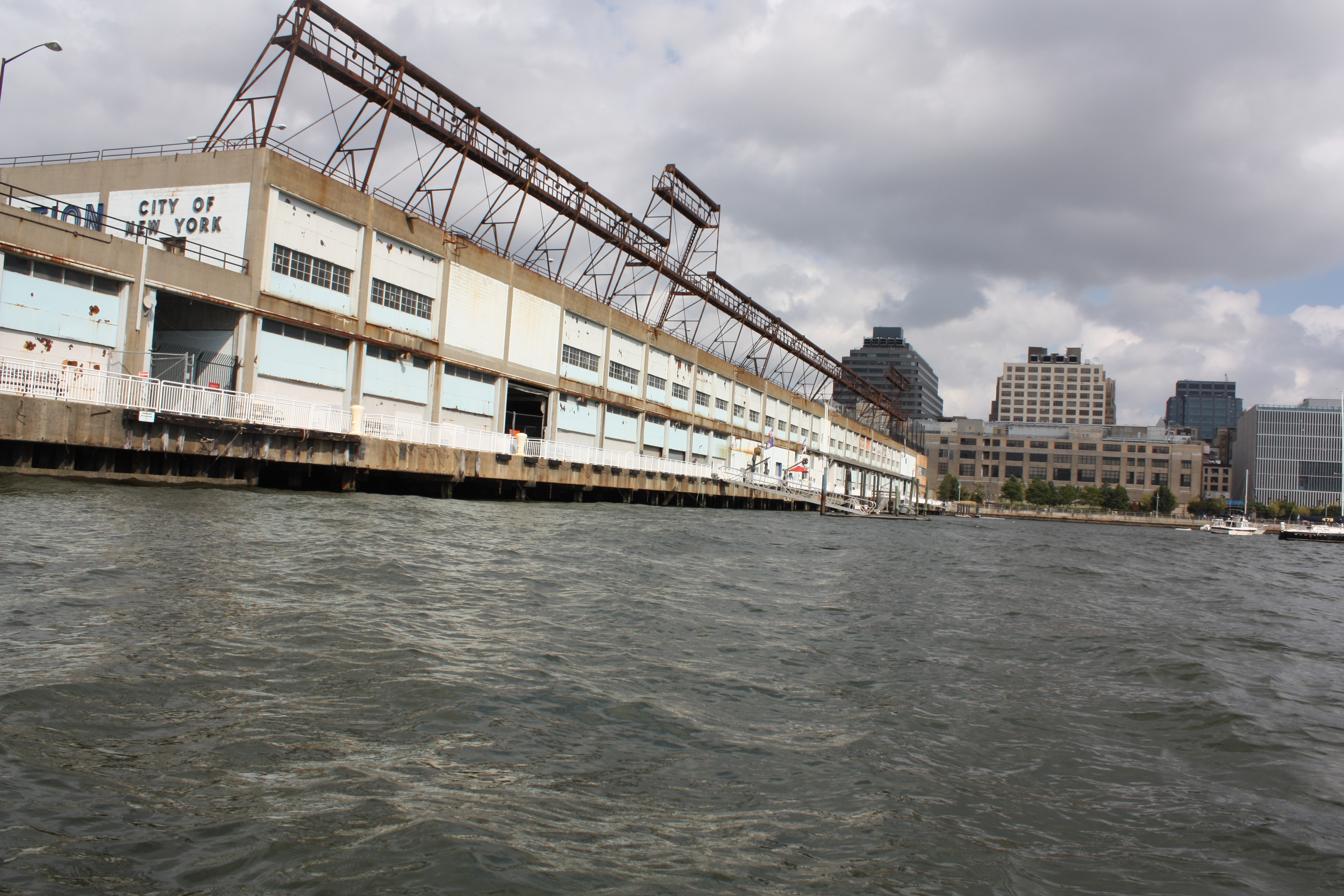
- Boathouse and dock on Pier 40's south walkway
- Abbreviation: VCB
- Founded: 2008
- Founder: Mike Davis
- Purpose: Environmentalism, Education, Boat Building and Boating
- Location: Pier 40, Manhattan, NY
- Coordinates: 40.7284°N 74.0134°W
- Origins: Floating the Apple
- Region served: Soho, Greenwich Village, Tribeca, Prospect Park, Brooklyn, and Brooklyn Heights
- Members: Over 100
- Key people: Rob Buchanan, Sally Curtis, Dave Clayton, Frank Cervi
- Website: villagecommunityboathouse.org

The Village Community Boathouse (or VCB) is a Manhattan-based nonprofit dedicated to promoting rowing, boat building, environmental stewardship and human-powered recreational boating on the Hudson River and the New York Estuary.

VCB is entirely run by volunteers and financed by donations and modest membership fees.

The organization is the only one in New York City providing public rowing in the Hudson River. Free rowing session are offered usually two or three times a week, mostly in the warmer months from April to October, weather permitting. VCB is located within the Hudson River Park at the south side of Pier 40, which is at the intersection of West Houston and West Street.

The boathouse also organizes and attends, chiefly for and with its members, rowing competitions and races. Youth and alumni races are held yearly in the fall. Once a year there is a Row Around Manhattan where most of their boats get launched and members and sponsors set out to circumnavigate the 30 miles around Manhattan. That events doubles as the annual fundraiser.

== History ==
Mike Davis was the founder of Floating the Apple, the first organisation dedicated to making the waters around New York City accessible to the public. The boathouse along with a few others grew out of his efforts. One of the leading members of the boathouse, Rob Buchanan, is quoted in Mr Davis obituary as saying: “Mike had a kind of Johnny Appleseed vision in which Floating the Apple would spawn a series of spinoff boathouses ....”

== Programs ==
Among several youth and education related programs are the rowing and navigation classes that the boathouse offers in cooperation with the New York Harbor School for their students.

In addition to Pier 40, VCB also runs a public rowing branch in Prospect Park lake and since 2016 boatbuilding classes at Brooklyn Bridge Park during the summer months. In 2016 a 14-foot-long Whitehall rowboat was built in bi-weekly and weekend boatbuilding sessions.

== Recognition ==
The organization has been recognized with the 2014 Village Award by the Greenwich Village Society for Historic Preservation for “connecting us to the waterways – those vital waterways that are so important to the history and development of Greenwich Village and all of New York City. The Village Community Boathouse is awarded a Village Award for its unique and accessible way of connecting the Village to the Hudson River, and New Yorkers with our maritime history".
