= Orri Vigfússon =

Icelandic entrepreneur and environmentalist

- Orri in conversation with Silver Donald Cameron about his work
- Born: 10 July 1942
- Died: 1 July 2017 (aged 74); Reykjavík, Iceland
- Occupations: Entrepreneur and environmentalist
- Awards: Goldman Environmental Prize

Orri Vigfússon (10 July 1942 – 1 July 2017) was an Icelandic entrepreneur and environmentalist. His stated objective was to "restore the abundance of wild salmon that formerly existed on both sides of the North Atlantic".

In 2004 Time magazine named Orri a "European Hero". He was awarded the Goldman Environmental Prize in 2007 for his efforts on saving endangered species. In 2008, he was elected as a Senior Global Fellow to the Ashoka Fellowship.

Orri died on 1 July 2017 in Reykjavík of lung cancer at the age of 74.

Mark Kurlansky dedicated his 2020 book, Salmon, to the memory of Orri Vigfússon.
