= Gig (boat) =

Type of boat

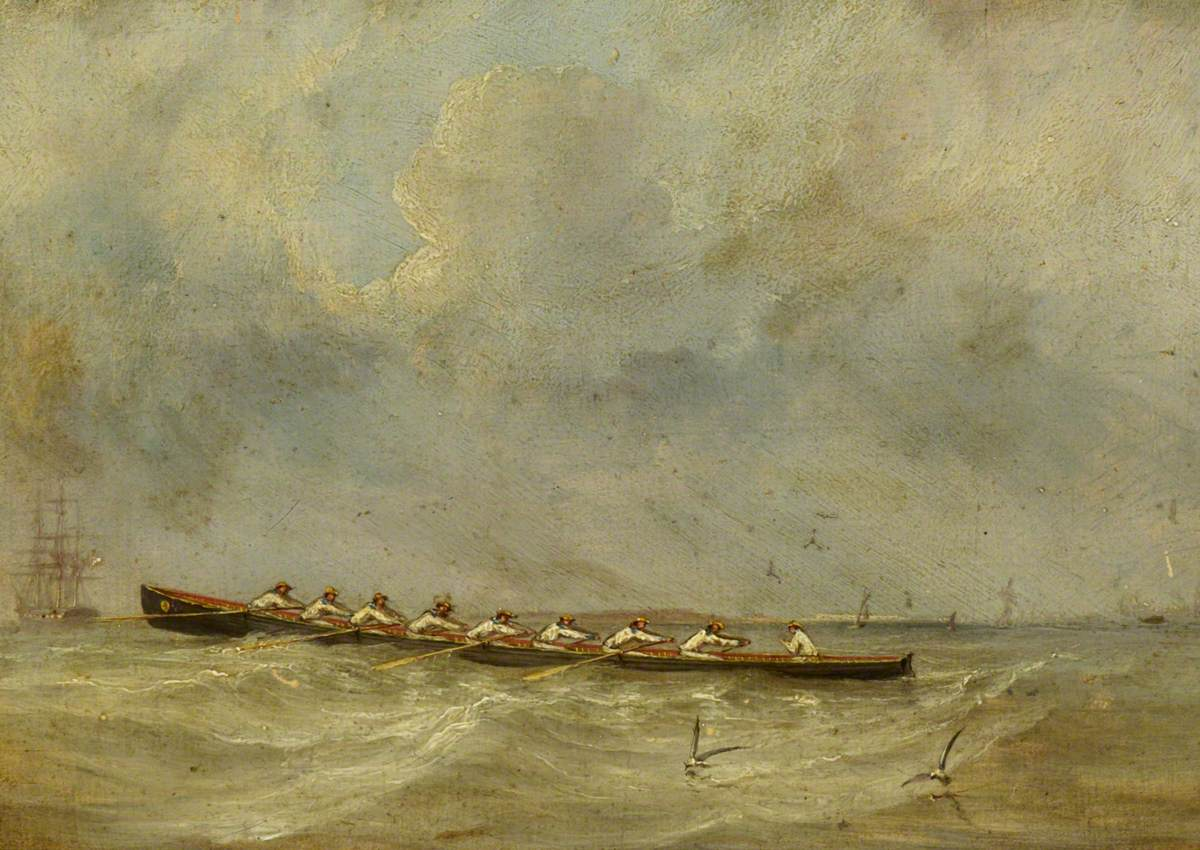
A painting of HMS Pique's gig in 1835

A gig /ˈɡɪɡ/ is a type of boat. It was optimised for speed under oar, but usually also fitted with a sailing rig for appropriate conditions. The type was in use by Deal boatmen in the 18th century. It first occurred as a naval ship's boat after Deal boatbuilders recommended a different design to boats ordered from them by the Royal Navy to equip the cutters purchased in the 1760s to combat smuggling. The captains of larger warships soon sought permission to substitute a gig for one of the heavier boats which were then used; some even had a gig built at their own expense. The gig therefore became part of the usual complement of ship's boats used in warships.

Gigs also had civilian uses, being employed to take pilots to and from ships, carrying mail and people for vessels waiting at anchor for favourable winds, salvage and lifesaving – and for smuggling. They could be found in places like the Mersey, as one of the faster and lighter boat types providing communication with ships anchored off the Norfolk and Suffolk coasts, and also from Deal to the Downs. The West Country is well known for its pilot gigs, with surviving and new-built examples now being raced at a large number of clubs in the region.

Gigs were lightly built, usually of clinker construction. They were narrow for their length. Typically, in naval gigs a beam of 5 feet 6 inches (1.68 m) was used for hull lengths from 20 to 28 feet (6.1 to 8.5 m) – propelled by between four, six or eight oars. Exceptions included gigs pulling ten oars. Oars were always single-banked (Note: "Single-banked" oars are where each thwart (seat) has a single crewmember handling a single oar. The oars alternate between each side of the boat, along the boat's length. This contrasts with a "double-anked" arrangement, where two crewmembers sit side by side on a thwart and each operate their own oar on their side of the boat.) in a gig.

Some would describe larger gigs as a galley, with regional variation on this terminology for civilian craft. Others regard the galley as a similar but different type. In Royal Navy usage of the latter half of the 19th century, the captain's gig was always referred to as "the galley". This contrasts with the US Navy usage: here the "captain's gig" was originally the traditional wooden boat, but in recent times a fibre-glass hulled powerboat which provided transport for the captain to and from their ship.

== History ==
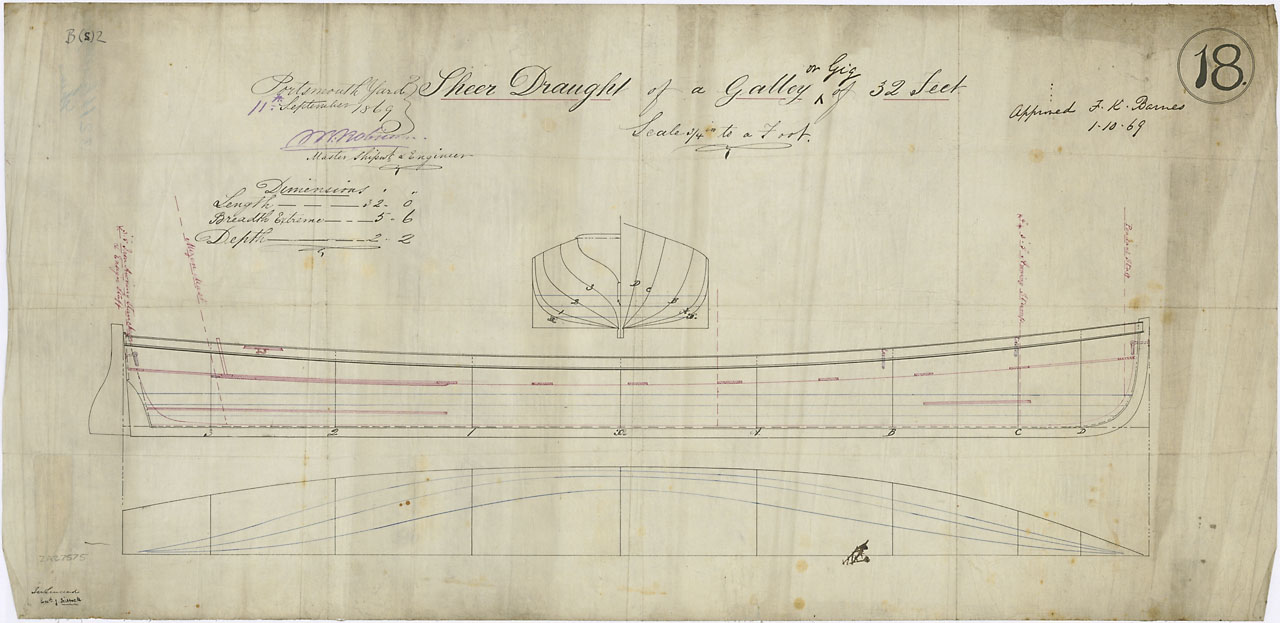
Lines plan of a 32 ft Royal Navy gig of 1869

The Royal Navy had, by the middle of the 18th century, a long-standing relationship with the boat builders of Deal. The Navy bought their clinker-built yawls and cutters – which contrasted with the carvel hulls of boats built in the Navy yards. The working boats of Deal were well known to all in the Navy when they came out to warships anchored in the Downs. In 1763, the Navy bought thirty cutters – cutter in the sense of the small warship or revenue protection vessel. These were to combat smuggling. To ensure they were properly equipped with boats, a dozen cutters (in the ship's boat meaning of the word) were ordered from Deal boatbuilders. A discussion with four of the local boatbuilders ensued, and they gave the firm advice that the ordered boats were not suitable for catching smugglers. (The Deal boatmen had a reputation for involvement in a substantial amount of smuggling at the time.) What was recommended instead was the gig, a type of boat used locally. The Navy accepted the recommendation.

When war started with France again in 1793, naval captains came to prefer smaller, lighter boats than the barges that they were issued with. The barge was meant to match the status of the officer they carried, but something that could be launched quickly and achieve a good speed was much more useful. Some brought on board boats that were their own property. Others just ignored the barges carried and used one of the cutters out of their ship's selection of boats. Gigs were the most popular of the private boats; Nelson had one on HMS Elephant in 1801. By 1808 it is clear that the Navy had accepted the gig on vessels other than the anti-smuggling cutters. By the end of the Napoleonic Wars Royal Navy gigs were available in six different lengths (18 ft to 26 ft) for issue to British warships.

== Characteristics ==
The gigs generally had a high wineglass transom, full keel, straight stem and somewhat rounded sides. There was in general very little rocker in the keel. The gunwales on many were nearly straight from bow to stern.

Howard Chapelle mentions the belief of W.P. Stephens that the gig was the precursor to the Whitehall rowboat – being built (in New York) by former apprentices in the Navy Yard. (Note: Chapelle does not make clear if he agrees with Stephens on this point. His description of the Whitehall rowboat states that in most of this type, each rower handled a pair of oars, unlike the single-banked gig.)

== Today ==
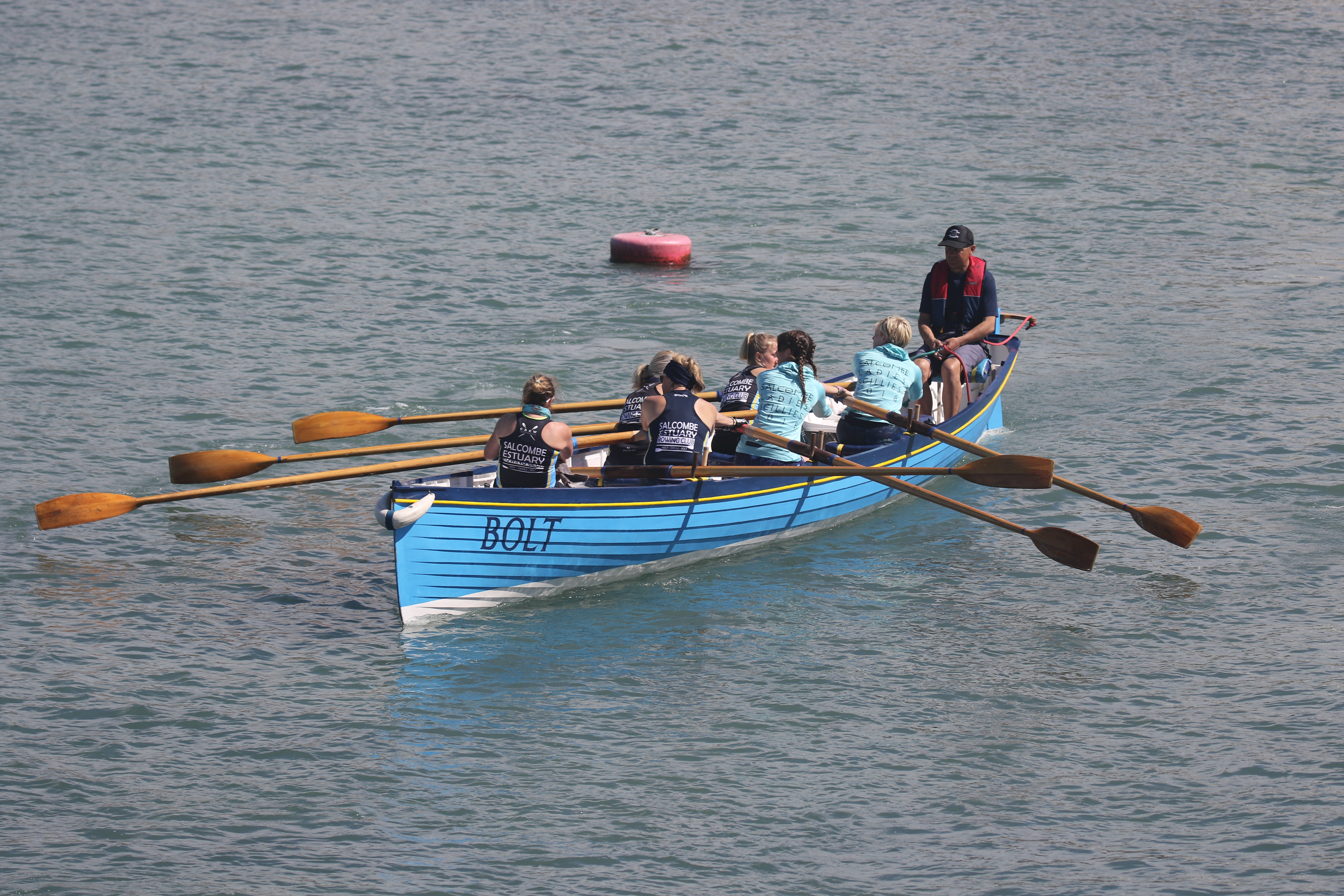
A gig that was built in 2007 (and then replaced with a newly built boat), in St Mary's Harbour

Gigs are still built for racing, with five builders who build this type of boat. The Cornish Pilot Gig Association has 88 clubs and more than 8,000 active members. Regular competitive events are held.

== U.S. Navy ==
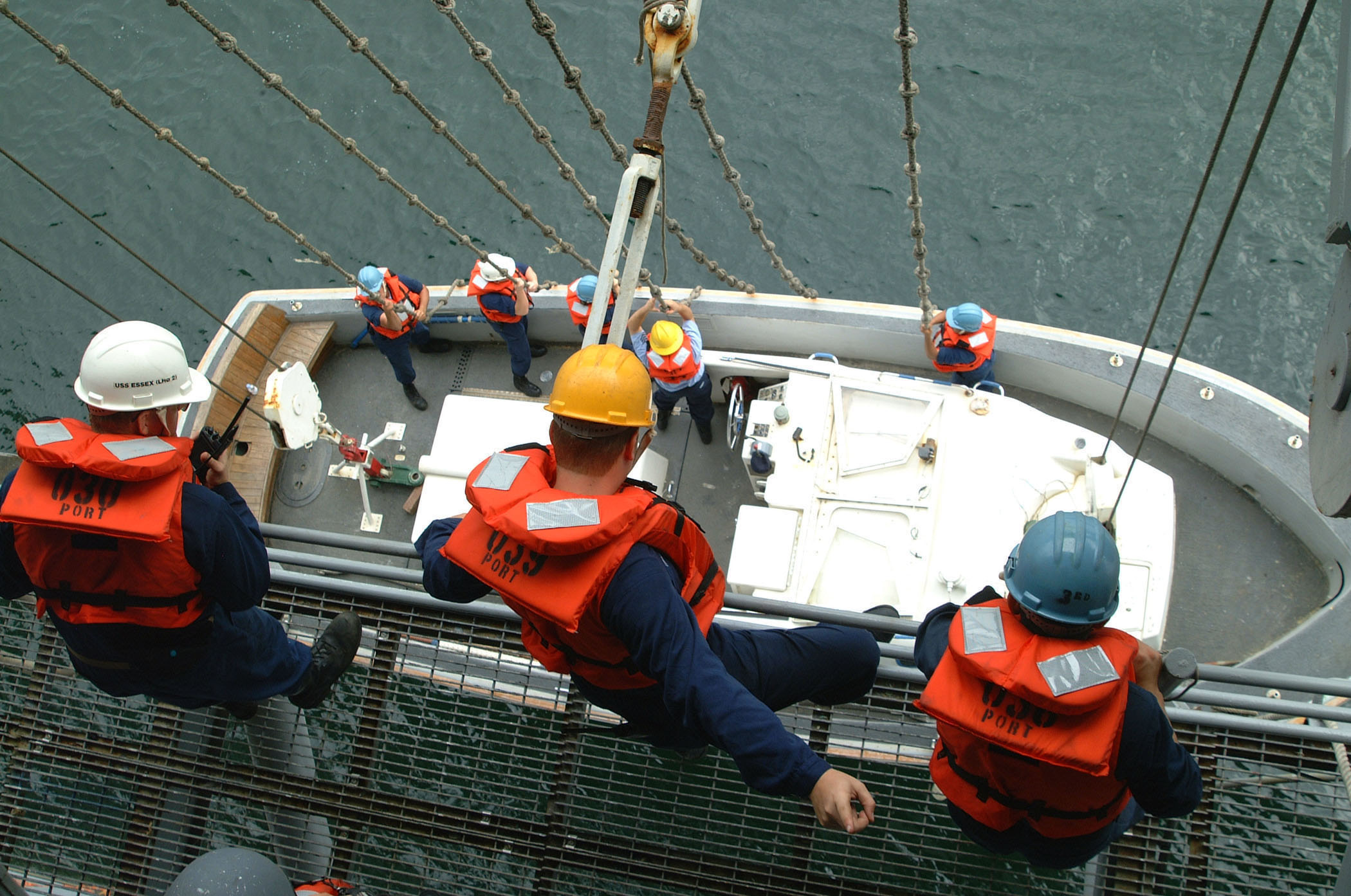
U.S. Navy sailors on the USS Essex (LHD-2) raise their captain's gig aboard (2002).

In the U.S. Navy, the boat provided for the transport of the captain is termed the captain's gig. Whilst this used to be a wooden, oared vessel of the traditional type, the term was retained as boats powered with engines took over this role.

These powered vessels varied by the size of the ship, with aircraft carriers and, until the mid-1990s when they were decommissioned, battleships, typically assigned a double cabin cruiser that was 33 to 35 feet (10 to 11 m) in length. These boats were typically painted with a white superstructure and gray hull with a red waterline stripe and black hull below the waterline. Because these capital ships also held a dual function as flagships for an embarked admiral, an identical vessel, albeit painted with a black hull and green waterline stripe, functioned as an admiral's barge.

Captain's gigs were eliminated from all U.S. Navy ships in early 2008 in an economy move.

== In popular culture ==
- In science fiction, the term is often used to refer to a small auxiliary spacecraft. In Star Trek, the craft is referred to as a "captain's yacht".

== See also ==
- Cornish pilot gig, which was to transport pilots out to ships and is now raced by many clubs
