= Pier 40 =

Pier in Manhattan, New York

- Pier 40 at Hudson River Park, The Pier
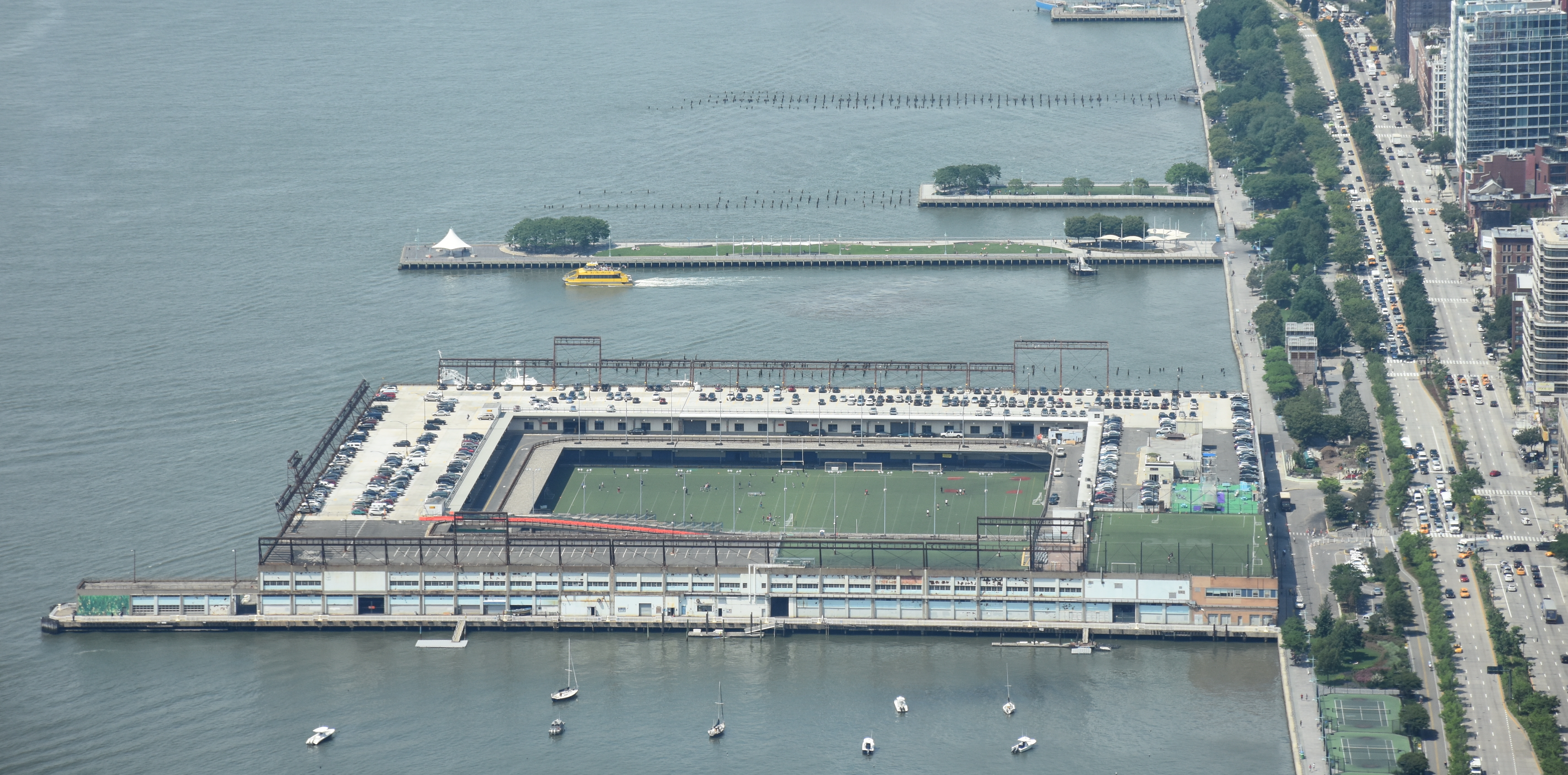
- Pier 40 (front) and piers 45 and 46, as seen from One World Observatory
- Interactive map of Pier 40
- Address: 353 West Street, Manhattan, New York 10014
- Location: Greenwich Village
- Coordinates: 40°43′45″N 74°00′45″W
- Owner: State of New York; City of New York
- Operator: Hudson River Park Trust
- Seating type: Movable bleachers
- Type: Multi-purpose
- Surface: Turf
- Field size: 400 × 400 feet
- Field shape: Square
- Acreage: 15
- Public transit: Subway: 1 train to Houston Street; Bus: M21

Construction
- Groundbreaking: July 31, 1958
- Opened: October 24, 1962 (as ship terminal); May 12, 2005 (as Hudson River Park)
- Renovated: 1998–2005
- Cost: $19 million

Tenant
- New York Knights

Pier 40 (officially known as Pier 40 at Hudson River Park) is a parking garage, sports facility, and former marine terminal at the west end of Houston Street in Manhattan, New York, within Hudson River Park. It is home to the New York Knights of the USA Rugby League, though it is primarily used by youth and high school athletics.

Pier 40 was originally one of five "finger" piers numbered 37 through 41, which were owned by the government of New York City, and were used by various transport companies. In 1956, the city announced a plan to consolidate the five piers into a single large passenger and cargo terminal serving the Holland America Line. Construction began in 1958 and the terminal was opened in 1962. When the Holland America Line moved to the New York Passenger Ship Terminal in 1974, the pier continued to be used by ships until 1983. Afterward, the New York State Department of Transportation purchased the pier as part of its failed Westway expressway proposal, with plans to use the pier for parking. Pier 40 was redesignated as parkland in 1998; several options for the structure were proposed, including redevelopment as a soccer stadium or an entertainment complex. It reopened in 2005 as a sporting complex within Hudson River Park.

The former cargo terminal is the largest structure in Hudson River Park, with an area of 14.5 acres (5.9 ha), and houses the Hudson River Park Trust's offices. Various park tenants host activities in Pier 40 as well. Sports include baseball, football, soccer, boat building, rowing, flying trapeze, and rugby among others. Despite its popularity, the terminal is dilapidated and sinking into the Hudson River, and was previously proposed for closure due to its deteriorated condition.

== History ==
=== Cargo terminal and parking lot ===
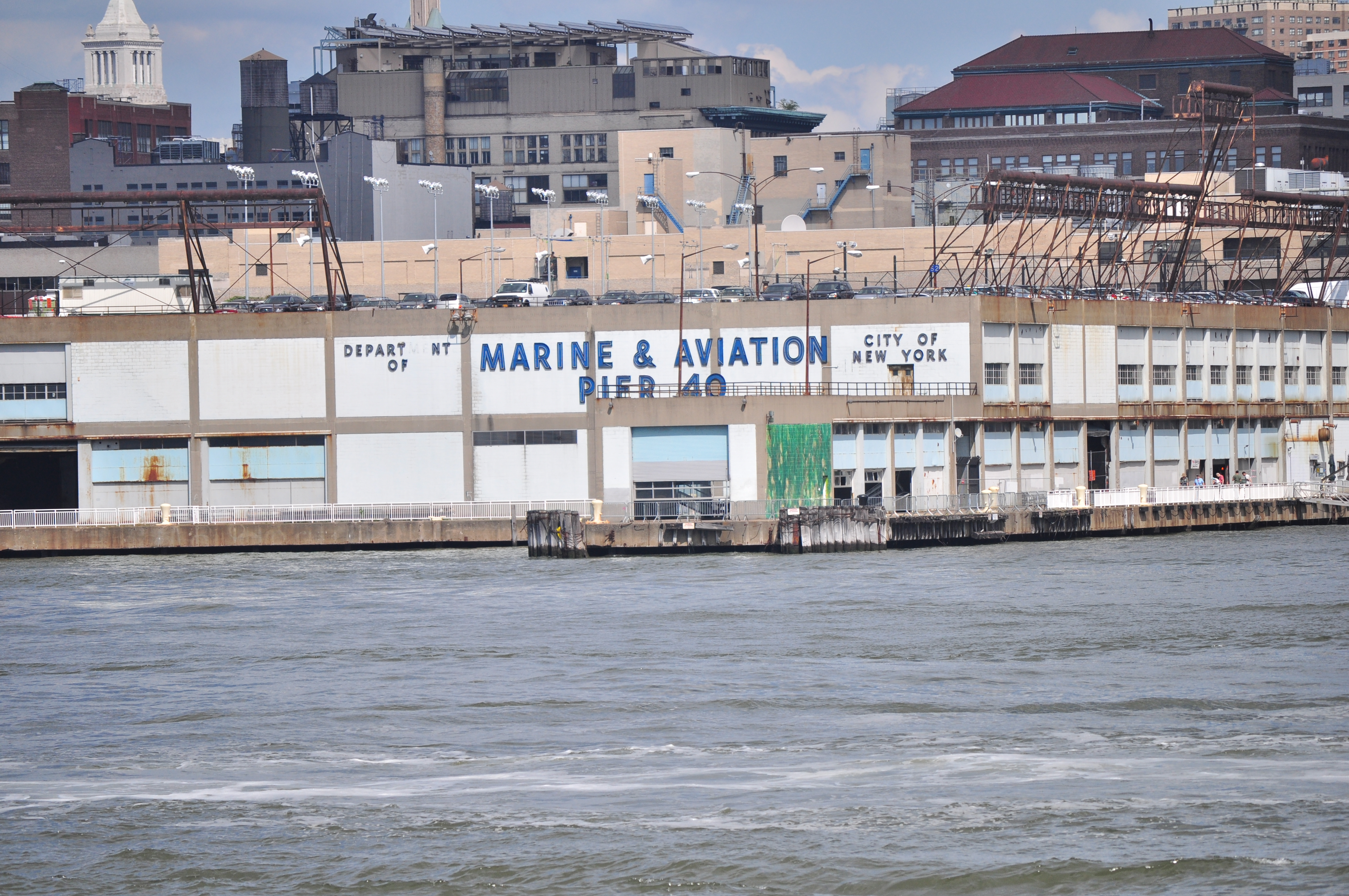
The side of Pier 40.

Prior to the construction of Pier 40, five city-owned "finger" piers were located at the site. From south to north, these were Pier 37 (at Charlton Street), Pier 38 (at King Street), Pier 39 (at West Houston Street), Pier 40 (at Clarkson Street), and Pier 41 (at Leroy Street). Companies using the piers in the early 20th century included the Southern Pacific Transportation Company, the Delaware, Lackawanna and Western Railroad (DL&W), and the Atlantic Transport Line. By the 1950s, the piers were used by the DL&W and the Baltimore and Ohio Railroad.

The current Pier 40 was proposed as a passenger and cargo terminal in February 1956 by the city's Marine and Aviation Department. The plan was put forward to allow the Holland America Line to move its area operations from Hoboken, New Jersey on the other side of the Hudson River, where the company was based for 73 years. It was the first terminal of its kind to be built by the city, and was designed as a "massive hollow square" with three levels to accommodate cars, taxis, and commercial trucks. The massive four-block structure replaced the five smaller "finger" piers. Construction began on July 31, 1958, at a projected cost of over $18 million. The pier began operations in 1962, with Holland America signing a 20-year lease for over $1.2 million in annual rent. Holland America also moved its offices from the Financial District to Pier 40. In its first year in operation, Pier 40 served over 2,000 passengers daily. In 1971, the Pier was taken over by the Port Authority of New York and New Jersey. Holland America moved their operations to the New York Passenger Ship Terminal in Hell's Kitchen in 1974. Pier 40 ceased serving ships at that time, and ended all operations around 1983.

Following the cessation of maritime operations, in 1982 the Pier was purchased by the State of New York for the failed Westway project. Under the New York State Department of Transportation's operations, its primary use was as a parking complex for cars, buses and trucks, as well as commercial warehousing. Bus, truck, and warehousing activity ended in 2004.

=== Park use ===
The facility was rededicated under the Hudson River Park act of 1998. At this time, two small athletic fields opened on the pier's roof. Between 1998 and 2003, several plans abound for the redevelopment of the site. One was an entertainment complex featuring movie theaters and Cirque du Soleil performances. Another plan sought to construct a public high school along with swimming pools and retail space, in addition to conventional sports fields. Additional plans called for a branch of the Guggenheim Museum, and a big-box store. Ultimately, a plan backed by the community won out, and the pier currently serves the dual purpose of commercial parking garage (located in the outer perimeter of the pier) and a multi-purpose sports facility (encompassing the center of the facility and small sections of the upper level). The main field, occupying the former cargo level, began construction in 2004, and opened in May 2005 with Governor George Pataki and professional soccer player Eddie Johnson in attendance. The sports fields were intended as an interim solution, until a major development would take place. According to the Hudson River Park Trust, the facility generates $6 million in operating revenue and 40 percent of the entire park's annual operating budget.

Following Hurricane Sandy in 2012, the pier was closed after being engulfed by more than 12 feet (3.7 m) of water. The fields reopened on December 19 following a $50,000 donation to fix the damaged turf surface, while full power was restored by spring 2013.

== Condition and use ==
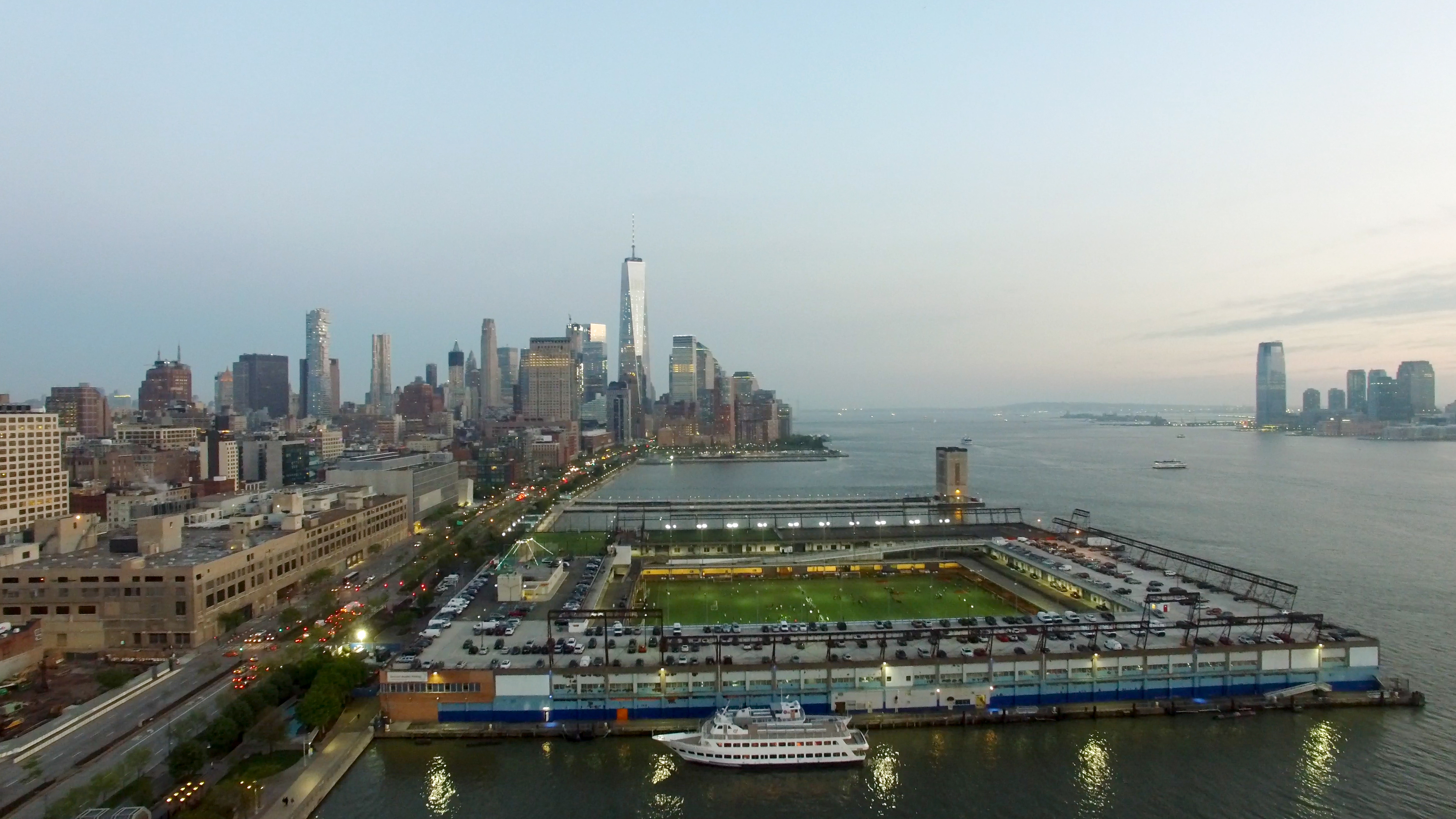
Drone photograph of Pier 40

Pier 40's design resembles a square donut, with the three decks hollowed in the center by the central courtyard. The outer facade consists of tan brick and blue-grey enamel. The outer decks, also referred to by the Hudson River Park Trust as the pier's "shed", are 175 feet (53 m) wide. The pier's base is made of concrete. Extending 810 feet (250 m) west out of Manhattan island over the Hudson River, the pier is held up by more than 3,500 steel H-pile girders reinforced by concrete sunk into the river. At the southwest corner of the site is a "finger pier" extending a further 142 feet (43 m) west.

According to several reports, the Pier is severely dilapidated and gradually sinking into the Hudson River. Sections of the roof have fallen in, and portions of the garage, a stairwell, bathrooms, and one of the upper fields, have been closed since 2012. A 2014 report found that over half of the facility's 3,500 steel girders that hold it above the river are severely deteriorated, possibly due to the electrical rust-protection system being shut down during the 1970s fiscal crisis. The turf field is also subject to flooding and warping after heavy precipitation, even though turf fields are typically designed to optimize drainage. In spite of the revenue the facility generates, Hudson River Park officials have discussed closing the park due to the $7 million annual financial burden required to maintain it.

=== As a marine terminal ===
The pier's three decks were used for the loading and unloading of cars, taxis, and trucks, which alleviated congestion on local streets. The ground floor was dedicated to cargo operations, with the central courtyard utilized for the parking and loading of up to 350 trucks simultaneously. The second floor was used for passenger operations, serving taxis picking up arriving passengers, and featuring a furnished waiting room. The roof served as parking for over 700 cars, and ramps connected the three levels.

=== As Hudson River Park ===
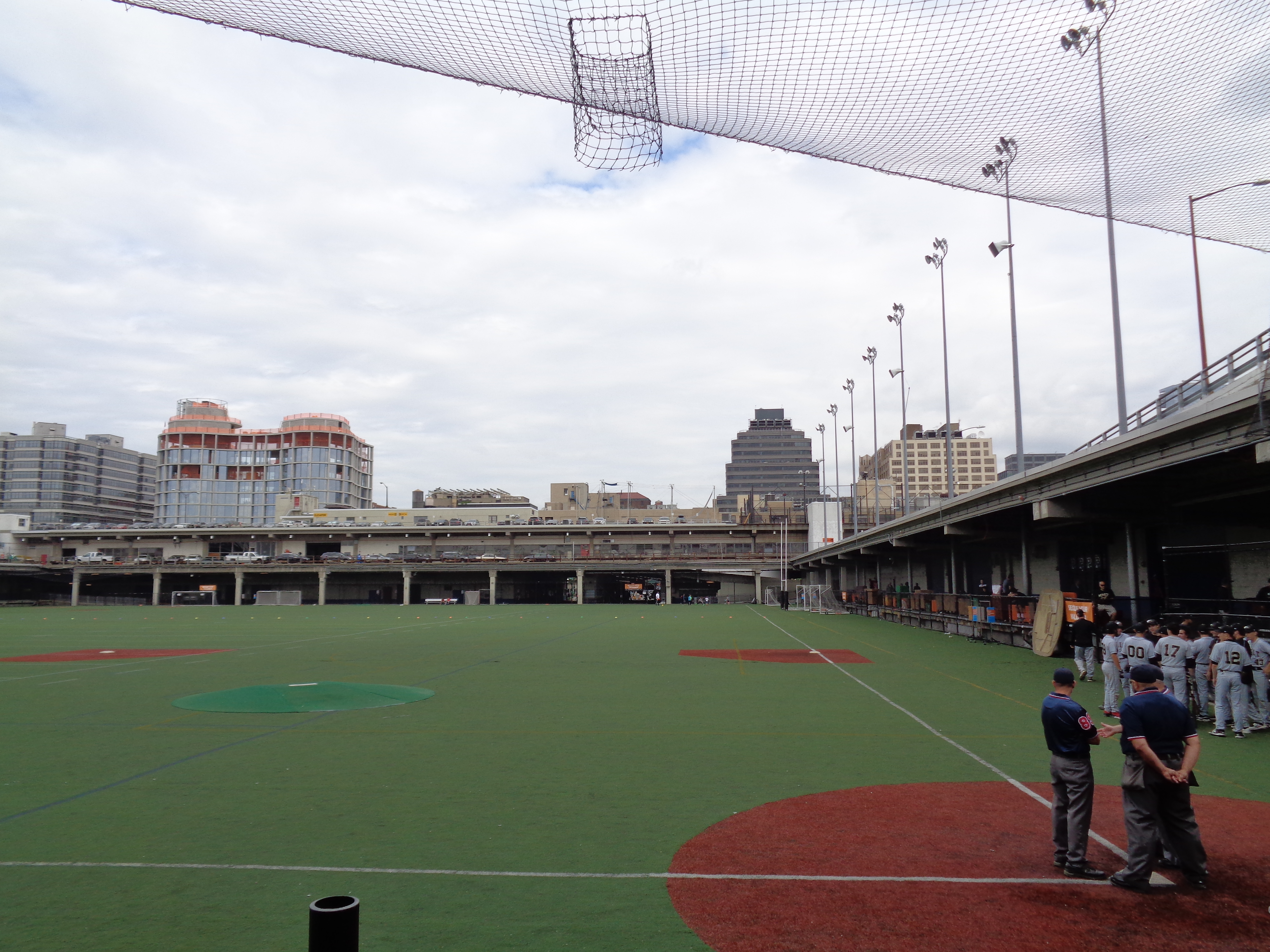
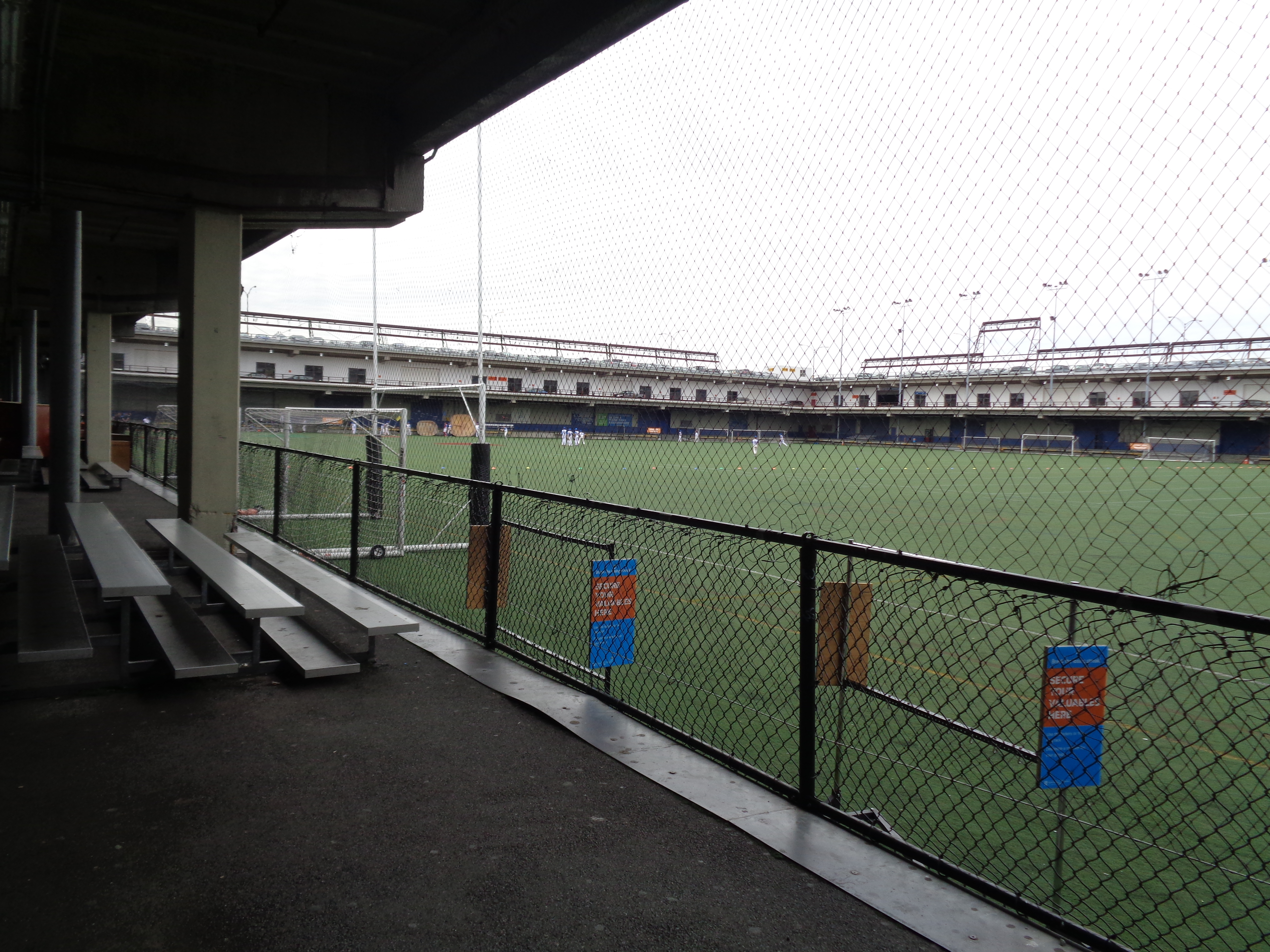
Pier 40's adult baseball field (top), and the walkway and netting circumscribing the field (bottom).

The pier's outer decks now act as a parking garage. The car park, a self-parking facility, has a 1,700-car capacity (formerly accommodating approximately 2,000) and serves over 1,500 drivers.

The upper-level recreational area, opened in 1998, features two fields (one small field and one soccer field) and a "flying trapeze" operated by the Trapeze School of New York. The fields were resurfaced in 2004. The rooftop field measures 120 by 210 feet (37 by 64 m).

The 400-by-400-foot (120 by 120 m) main athletic field at ground level (called the courtyard field) is constructed of modern artificial turf manufactured by FieldTurf, consisting of plastic grass blades submerged in recycled rubber pellets. Construction of the field began in 2004, and the field was opened in May 2005. The regulation-size baseball field is located at the southwest corner of the park, while the Little League/softball field is located at the northeast corner. Both fields feature imitation-dirt turf cut-outs, base anchors, dugout, and synthetic turf pitching mounds. Indoor batting cages are located near the baseball field. The center of the park (east-to-west) is marked up for football, with movable goal posts and practice sleds. Several movable soccer goals are also located around the ground floor field, which can be set up into two or four soccer pitches covering each half or each corner of the field respectively. At some point, black nets were installed around the field to prevent balls from flying into the asphalt walkway that surrounds the perimeter of the sports field. The facility also features twelve stadium lighting fixtures, allowing night games to be played.

Prior to 2008, Public Schools Athletic League (PSAL)-sanctioned high school baseball games could not be played at Pier 40. This was because the portable mounds owned by the facility, which were 13 feet (4.0 m) in diameter, did not meet the specifications of the league. The portable mounds (as opposed to a permanent dirt mound) were required to maintain the multi-purpose status of the field. In 2008, after lobbying by the nearby Stuyvesant High School, a new mound was purchased from an Iowa-based company that was 18 feet (5.5 m) in diameter. The new mound, consisting of a center and two side pieces, was the first mound of its kind, and allowed for PSAL league games to be played.

Spaces on the southern side of the pier are occupied by several nonprofit organizations such as the Village Community Boathouse, the River Project, and New York Outrigger, as well as a commercial a kayak shop. The Village Community Boathouse builds and stores traditional wooden rowboats there. During the summer months these boats, called Whitehall gigs, are launched at least twice weekly for free public rowing trips up and down the Hudson River. There is also a mooring field, maintained by the Hudson River Park Trust, that offers seasonal and daily moorings for recreational sail and motor boats.

== Future development ==
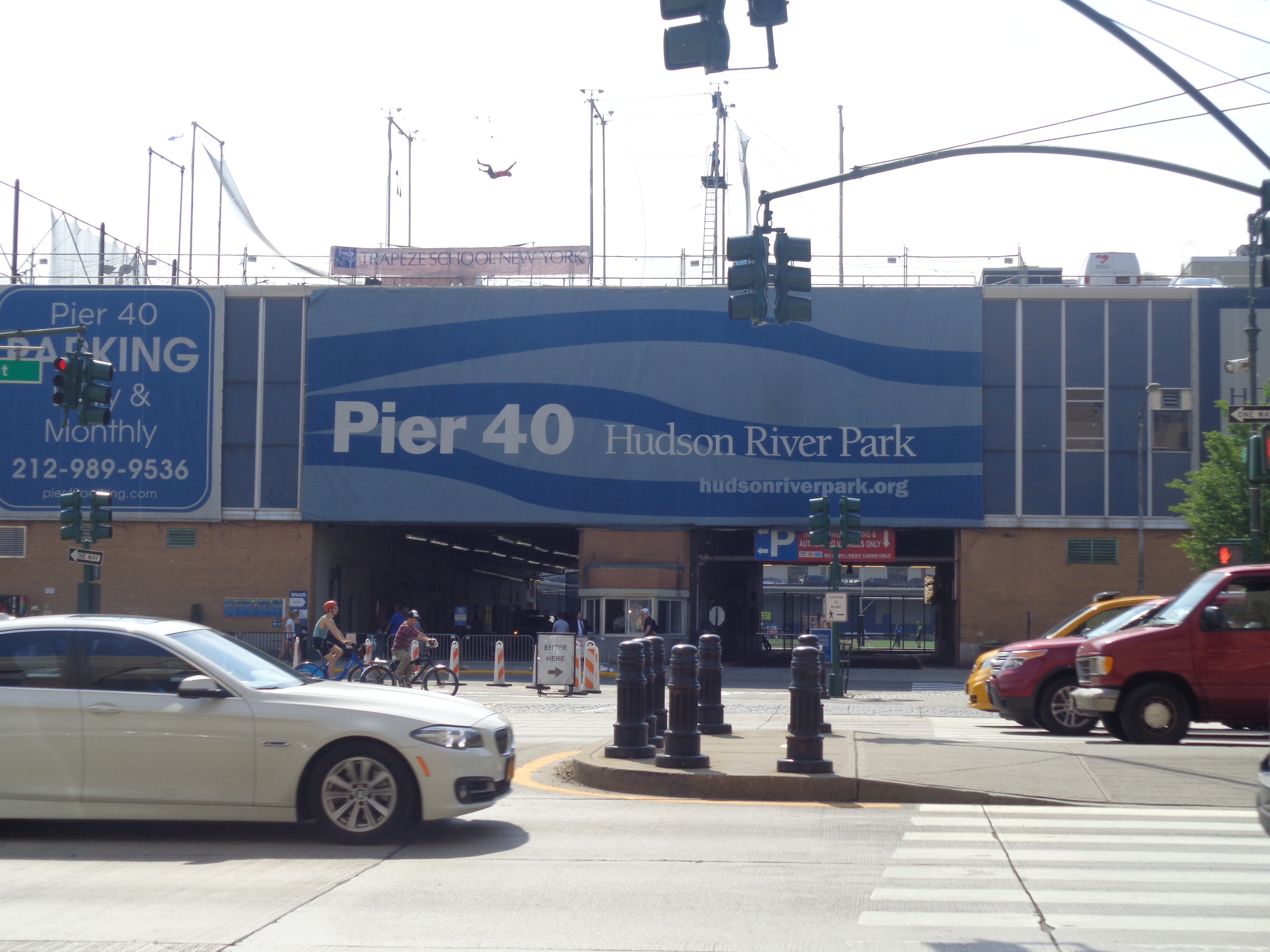
Pier 40's entrance

When established as a park in 1998, Pier 40 was zoned for exclusively entertainment and retail purposes, with half of the pier required to be set aside for recreation. Because of the facility's condition, several proposals have been made to increase revenue to the park for repairs, which were estimated to cost anywhere between tens and hundreds of millions of dollars. A 2012 proposal from local real estate developer and former Friends of Hudson River Park chairman Douglas Durst would consolidate the current parking facilities from a self-park to three-level stacked parking, freeing up 500,000 square feet on the roof for commercial space. The plan did not gain support. A 2014 proposal would demolish and redevelop the building across the street into a residential and retail facility over the course of 10 years, which would require the sale of Pier 40's air rights but would generate an estimated $100 million in revenue. This plan was reportedly canceled following public and political opposition.

In 2012, reports surfaced that the then-new Major League Soccer team New York City FC, which plays at Yankee Stadium in the Bronx, were seeking to develop a new soccer stadium at the Pier 40 site. Renderings of this proposed stadium were leaked online. The plan was scrapped in 2015 due to local opposition.

== Tenants ==
=== Professional ===
- New York Knights – USA Rugby League

=== Amateur and youth ===
- New York University - soccer (practice only)
- ASA College – baseball (practice only), lacrosse (practice only)
- Stuyvesant High School – football, baseball
- Greenwich Village Little League (GVLL), Downtown Little League, Pier40Baseball – youth baseball
- Downtown United Soccer Club & Gotham Girls FC – youth soccer
