= New York Harbor School =

Public school in New York City

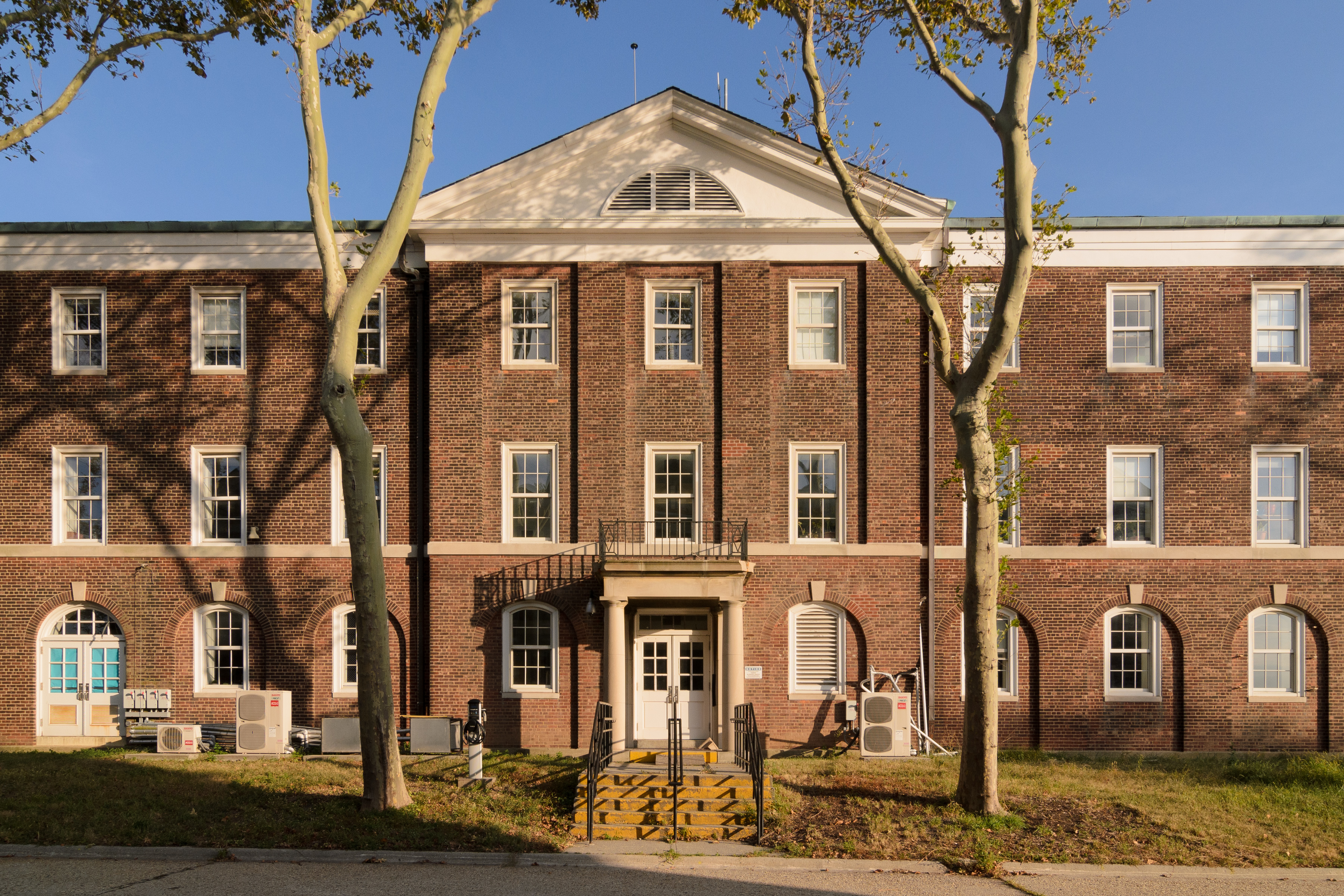
- Governors Island Building 550, the main school building.

Location
- 550 Wheeler Avenue; New York, NY 10004; United States; 40°41′27″N 74°01′14″W

Information
- Type: Public
- Established: 2003
- Founder: Murray Fisher
- Principal: Michael Hojnacki
- Grades: 9–12
- Enrollment: approx. 430
- Colors: Blue and White
- Mascot: Sharks
- Website: www.newyorkharborschool.org

The Urban Assembly New York Harbor School, also called the Harbor School, is a public high school located on Governors Island. This school is unique in New York City, which has 538 miles (866 km) of waterfront, in that it attempts to relate every aspect of its curriculum to the water. The school is part of the Urban Assembly network of 21 college-prep schools in New York City.

A stated focus of the school is to continue to work with organizations such as Waterkeeper Alliance and the Governors Island Alliance to ensure the improvement and restoration of New York City's harbor.

== History ==
The NYHS officially opened in 2003. The school was founded with the help of three organizations: the Urban Assembly, the South Street Seaport Museum, and Waterkeeper Alliance. Before moving to its own building on Governors Island, the school was located within the Bushwick Campus in Bushwick, Brooklyn, first in the Annex and then, in 2004, on the building's fourth floor.

Bushwick High School, built in 1911, was one of the first public high schools in that area, on the former Union Cemetery used by Methodist churches of Manhattan and Brooklyn. As part of the New York City's Department of Education's effort to close large high schools and replace them with much smaller schools, Bushwick High School began to be phased out in 2003. In that year, three new high schools were founded on the Bushwick campus. One was the Harbor School, under founding principal, Nathan Dudley. The other two schools were the Academy of Urban Planning and the Bushwick School for Social Justice. At the close of Bushwick High School in 2006, the Academy of Environmental Leadership, a fourth high school, was added to the campus.

Since its founding, the Harbor School worked to secure a site on the water so that the school could better fulfill its mission. After several years and several proposals, the Governors Island Preservation and Education Corporation (GIPEC) announced in November 2006 that the Harbor School would be moving to Governors Island. The NYHS left Bushwick in July 2010 and moved to a new academic building on Governor's Island, formerly Building 550.

== Programs ==
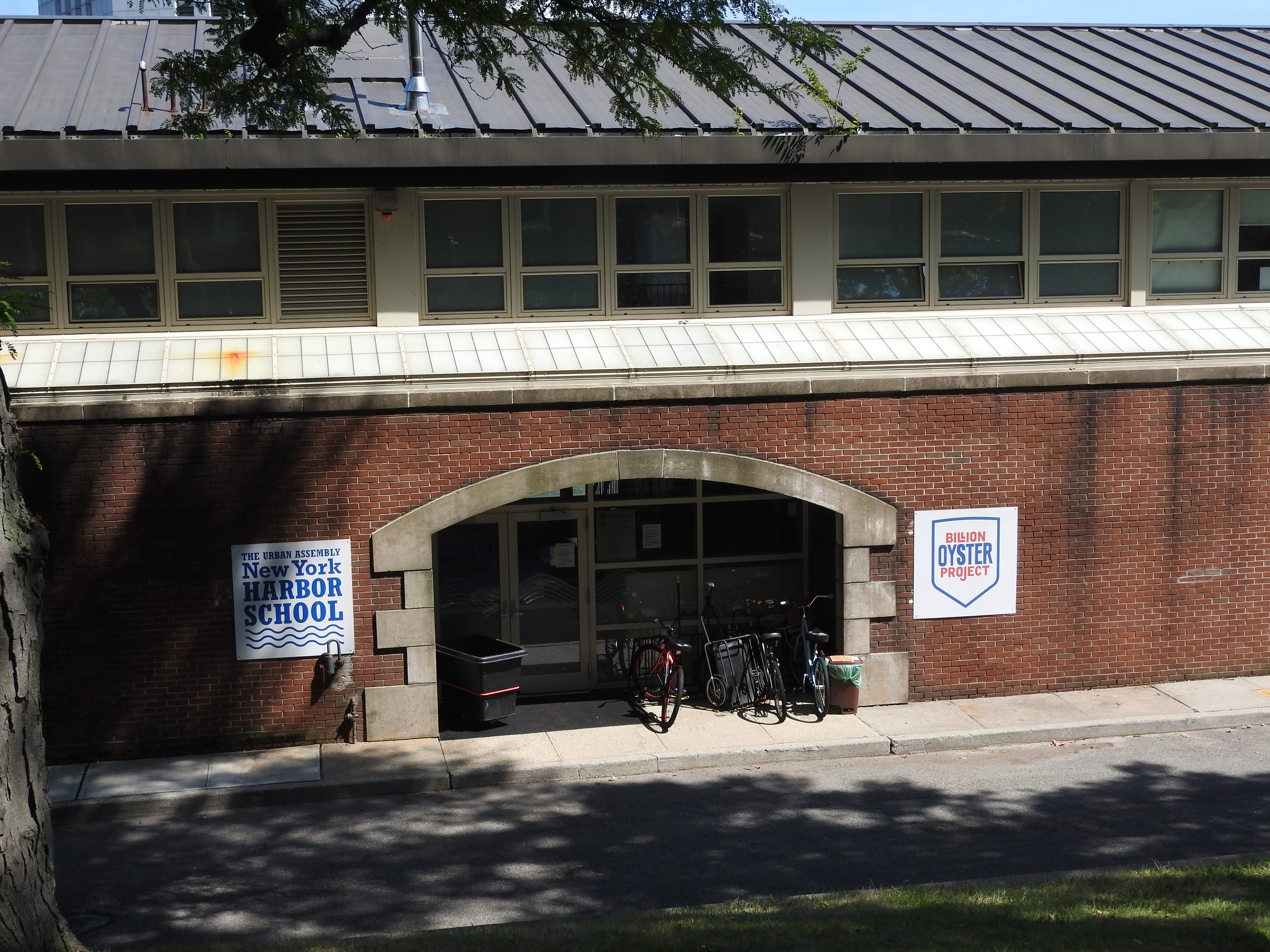
Building 134, serving as Harbor School's MAST Center and boathouse.

The Harbor School runs various programs related to New York's maritime experience. Private and public funding support the programs.

The Harbor School terms the harbor their "outdoor laboratory" and revolves their pedagogy around environmental education. Students regularly study New York City's two major rivers, the Hudson River and the East River. Activities include sampling and measuring water quality, attending lectures on marine science and river history, studying the river's benthic zone, and more. Many students have the opportunity to learn how to sail (and can pursue further licensing, if desired) and navigate on schooners such as the Lettie G. Howard and Pioneer. As the curriculum focuses on environmentalism and water conservation, students also care for aquatic organisms and study animals that inhabit both aquatic and land-based ecosystems.

The Harbor School offers both water-related and traditional after-school programs. Examples of the former include The Harbor SEALs Citizen Science Monitoring program, rowing, sailing, aquabatics, vessel operations, among others.

=== Career and Technical Education ===
The New York City Department of Education classifies the UA New York Harbor School as a Career and Technical Education high school. CTE is the new term for vocational education. The New York City DOE has rethought CTE training based on the growing need for college-educated people who are also trained in technical fields. The Harbor School is part of this effort to prepare students for college with a regular New York State Regents Diploma and for a technical career.

Starting sophomore year, students may choose one out of seven programs (vessel operations, ocean engineering, marine systems technology, professional/scientific diving, Marine Biology Research Program, marine policy and advocacy, and aquaculture) to focus on for the rest of their high school career. Depending on their chosen field, students may obtain industry certification in marine science or technology. However, there are a few restrictions. For example, students who choose professional diving must pass a series of aquatic and endurance-related tests before being accepted into the program. Students in the Marine Biology Research Program, perform scientific monitoring and work on long-term restoration projects around the Hudson-Raritan Estuary. CTE coursework includes a continuum of work-based learning experiences that extend student learning from the school classroom into a real-world, work-related context.

=== New York Harbor Regatta ===
The Harbor School hosts an annual regatta to support their environmental education program.

Past events have included attendees such as NBC's Willie Geist and Savannah Guthrie, Martha Stewart, the United States Coast Guard, and sailing Olympian professionals such as Dawn Riley and Hannah Swett. The Harbor School is also supported by corporate sponsors such as Nautica, Conde Nast, Credit Suisse, Goldman Sachs and Rolex.
