= John Gardner (boat builder) =

Historian of water craft, labor organizer, and boat builder

- Born: Calais, Maine
- Died: Haverhill, Massachusetts
- Education: Calais Academy, Maine; 1923; Maine Normal School;Teacher's College at Columbia University; MA, 1932
- Occupations: Sailor, boat builder and book author

John Gardner (1905–1995) born in Calais, Maine, USA; was a historian of water craft, a writer, a labor organizer, and a designer and builder of wooden boats.

== Education ==
Gardner graduated from Calais Academy, Maine, in the class of 1923; he studied to be a teacher at Machias Normal School, Maine; and obtained a Master's Degree from The Teacher's College at Columbia University in 1932.

== Career ==
In the 1930s Gardner worked as a labor organizer for the Congress of Industrial Organizations. During World War II Gardner went to work building boats in a Marblehead boat shop and during World War II Gardner worked in a boat yard in Quincy, Massachusetts. From 1969 to 1995 Gardner was Associate Curator of Small Craft at Mystic Seaport Museum, Connecticut. He was technical editor of National Fisherman magazine. Gardner was called the "Dean of American Small Craft" and the father of the modern wooden boat revival. His work in marine history and in analyzing traditional boat designs preserved many classic small craft designs from being lost. Gardner also popularized many small boat designs that had been unique to a certain town or region by making plans available and offering commentary on their attributes. He worked tirelessly to show that traditional working small craft could be readily adapted to pleasure use, starting a trend among small boat aficionados which endures today. He is honored by the Traditional Small Craft Association through its John Gardner Fund.

== Death ==
Gardner died in Marblehead, Massachusetts, in 1995.

== Publications ==
- 1970 Woodenboats to Build and Use Mystic Seaport Museum (January 1, 1970) ISBN 0913372781
- 1977 Building Classic Small Craft (vol.1) International Marine/Ragged Mountain Press ISBN 007142797X
- 1984 More Building Classic Small Craft, which is a re-issue of Building Classic Small Craft (vol.2)
- 1987 Dory Book. Mystic Seaport Museum, Mystic Connecticut. ISBN 0-913372-44-7
- 1993 Classic Small Craft You Can Build and Use Mystic Seaport Museum Inc (July 1993) ISBN 0913372668
- 1996 Building Classic Small Craft: Complete Plans and Instructions for Building 47 Boats. Includes Building Classic Small Craft (vol.1) & More Building Classic Small Craft.

== Obituaries ==
NY Times: John Gardner 90 Boat Curator at Mystic Seaport Museum Dies
