= Mark Kurlansky =

American journalist and writer (born 1948)

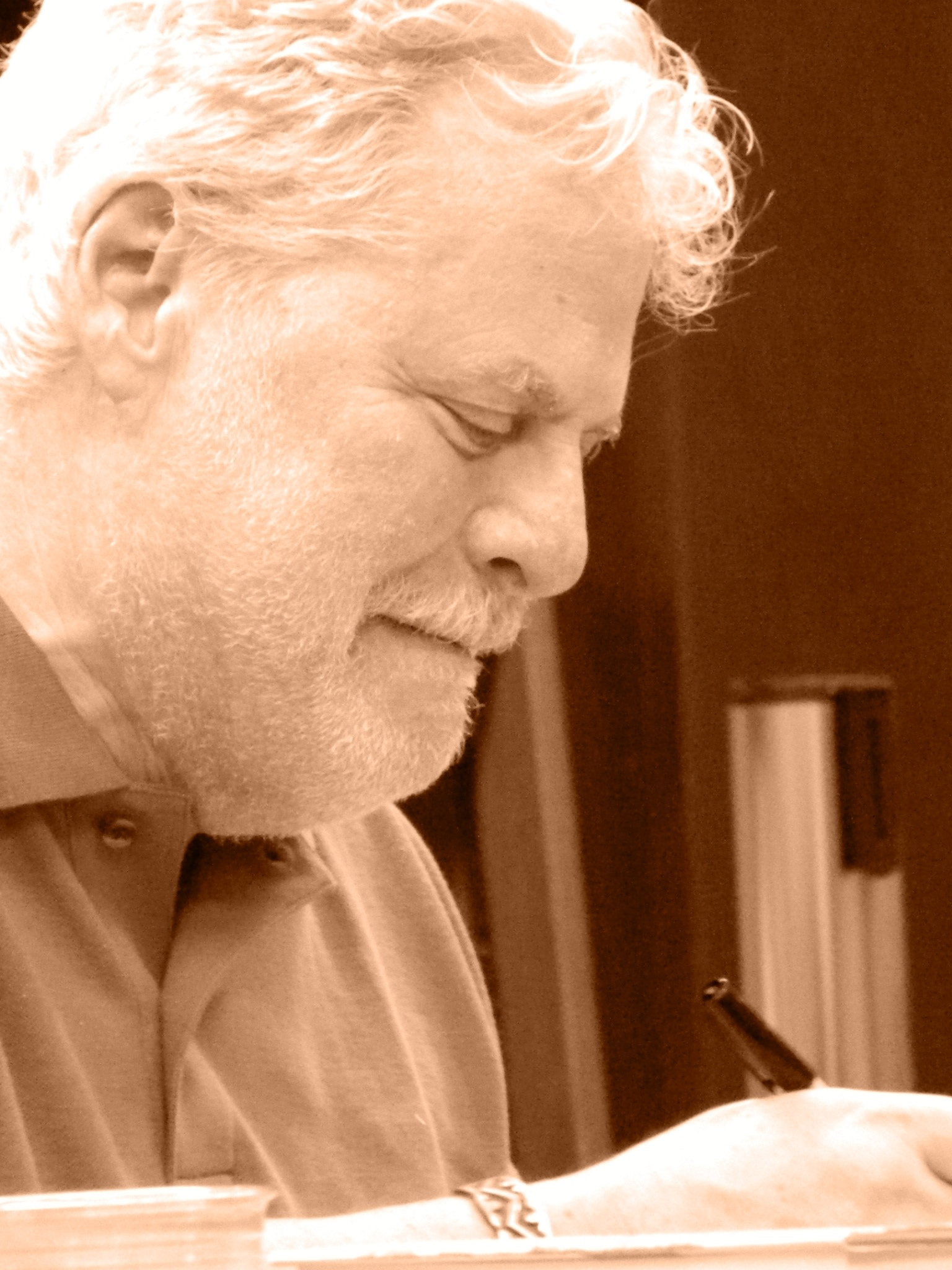
- Kurlansky in 2013
- Born: December 7, 1948 (age 77); Hartford, Connecticut, U.S.
- Education: Butler University (BA)
- Occupations: Journalist; author
- Writing career
- Years active: 1976–present
- Genres: Nonfiction; microhistory

Mark Kurlansky (December 7, 1948) is an American journalist and author who has written a number of books of fiction and nonfiction. His 1997 book, Cod: A Biography of the Fish That Changed the World (1997), was an international bestseller and was translated into more than fifteen languages. His book Nonviolence: Twenty-five Lessons From the History of a Dangerous Idea (2006) was the nonfiction winner of the 2007 Dayton Literary Peace Prize.

== Early life and education ==
Kurlansky was born in Hartford, Connecticut on December 7, 1948. He attended Butler University, where he earned a BA in 1970. He started his career as a playwright. He was a theatre major at college and wrote seven or eight plays, a few of which were produced. He later said that he became "frustrated with theatre, which is to say I became frustrated with Broadway".

== Career ==
From 1976 to 1991, he worked as a correspondent in Western Europe for the Miami Herald, The Philadelphia Inquirer, and eventually the Paris-based International Herald Tribune. He moved to Mexico in 1982, where he continued to practice journalism. In 2007, he was named the Baruch College Harman writer-in-residence.

Kurlansky wrote his first book, A Continent of Islands, in 1992, and went on to write several more throughout the 1990s. His third work of nonfiction, Cod: A Biography of the Fish That Changed the World, won the 1998 James Beard Award. It became an international bestseller and was translated into more than 15 languages. His 2002 book, Salt, was a New York Times bestseller. Kurlansky's work and contribution to Basque identity and culture was recognized in 2001 when the Society of Basque Studies in America named him to the Basque Hall of Fame. That same year, he was awarded an honorary ambassadorship from the Basque government.

As a teenager, Kurlansky called Émile Zola his "hero", and in 2009, he translated one of Zola's novels, The Belly of Paris, whose theme is the food markets of Paris.

Kurlansky's 2009 book, The Food of a Younger Land, with the subtitle "A portrait of American food – before the national highway system, before chain restaurants, and before frozen food, when the nation's food was seasonal, regional, and traditional – from the lost WPA files", details American foodways in the early 20th century.

== Publications ==
=== Nonfiction ===
External videos
- Presentation by Kurlansky on Cod: A Biography of the Fish That Changed the World, August 15, 1998, C-SPAN
- Presentation by Kurlansky on Salt: A World History, January 29, 2002, C-SPAN
- Presentation by Kurlansky on 1968: The Year That Rocked the World, January 14, 2004, C-SPAN
- Presentation by Kurlansky on The Food of a Younger Land, May 14, 2009, C-SPAN
- Presentation by Kurlansky on Paper: Paging Through History, June 12, 2016, C-SPAN

- A Continent of Islands: Searching for the Caribbean Destiny (1992), Addison-Wesley Publishing. ISBN 0-201-52396-5
- A Chosen Few: The Resurrection of European Jewry (1995), ISBN 0-201-60898-7
- Cod: A Biography of the Fish That Changed the World (1997), ISBN 0-8027-1326-2
- The Basque History of the World (1999), ISBN 0-8027-1349-1
- Salt: A World History (2002), ISBN 0-8027-1373-4
- 1968: The Year that Rocked the World (2004), ISBN 0-345-45581-9
- The Big Oyster: History on the Half Shell (2006), ISBN 0-345-47638-7
- Nonviolence: The History of a Dangerous Idea (2006), ISBN 978-0-224-07791-0
- Nonviolence: Twenty-five Lessons From the History of a Dangerous Idea (2006), ISBN 0-679-64335-4
- The Last Fish Tale: The Fate of the Atlantic and Survival in Gloucester, America's Oldest Fishing Port and Most Original Town (2008), ISBN 0-345-48727-3
- The Food of a Younger Land (2009), ISBN 1-59448-865-7
- The Eastern Stars: How Baseball Changed the Dominican Town of San Pedro de Macoris (2010), ISBN 1-59448-750-2
- World Without Fish (2011), this work was chosen by many school districts to be used in their curriculum as part of EL education, including Wake County Public School System.
- What?: Are These the 20 Most Important Questions in Human History—Or Is This a Game of 20 Questions? (2011), ISBN 978-0-8027-7906-9
- Hank Greenberg: The Hero Who Didn't Want to Be One (2011), ISBN 978-0300136609
- Birdseye: The Adventures of a Curious Man (2012), ISBN 978-0-385-52705-7
- Ready for a Brand New Beat: How "Dancing in the Street" Became the Anthem for a Changing America (2013), ISBN 978-1-59448-722-4
- International Night: A Father and Daughter Cook Their Way Around the World with Talia Kurlansky (2014), ISBN 978-1-620-40027-2
- Paper: Paging Through History (2016), ISBN 978-0393239614
- Havana: A Subtropical Delirium (2017), ISBN 978-1632863911
- Milk!: A 10,000-Year Food Fracas (2018), ISBN 9781632863843
- Bugless: Why Ladybugs, Butterflies, Fireflies, and Bees are Disappearing (2019), ISBN 978-1547600854
- Salmon and the Earth: The History of a Common Fate (2020), ISBN 978-1938340864
- The Unreasonable Virtue of Fly Fishing (2021), ISBN 978-1635573077
- The Importance of Not Being Ernest: My Life with the Uninvited Hemingway (2022), ISBN 9781642504637
- The Core of an Onion (Bloomsbury, 2023) ISBN 9781635575934
- The Boston Way: Radicals Against Slavery and the Civil War (2025), ISBN 9781567927658

=== Fiction ===
- The White Man in the Tree, and Other Stories (2000), ISBN 0-671-03605-X
- Boogaloo on 2nd Avenue: A Novel of Pastry, Guilt, and Music (2005), ISBN 0-345-44818-9
- Edible Stories: A Novel in Sixteen Parts (2010), ISBN 1-59448-488-0
- City Beasts: Fourteen Stories of Uninvited Wildlife (2015), ISBN 9781594485879
- Cheesecake: A Novel (2025), ISBN 9781639735723

=== Children's books ===
- The Cod's Tale, illustrated by S. D. Schindler (G. P. Putnam's Sons, 2001), ISBN 0-399-23476-4
- The Girl Who Swam to Euskadi (Reno, NV: Center for Basque Studies, 2005), ISBN 1-877802-54-9
- The Story of Salt, illus. S. D. Schindler (Putnam, 2006), ISBN 0-399-23998-7
- Battle Fatigue (Walker Books & Co., 2011), ISBN 978-0-8027-2264-5, young-adult historical novel, OCLC 704383968
- Frozen in Time: Clarence Birdseye's Outrageous Idea About Frozen Food (2014), ISBN 978-0-385-37244-2, 165 pp.

=== As editor ===
- Choice Cuts: A Savory Selection of Food Writing From Around the World and Throughout History (2002), ISBN 0-345-45710-2

=== As translator ===
- The Belly of Paris by Émile Zola, Mark Kurlansky as translator. The Modern Library, 2009. ISBN 978-0-8129-7422-5

== Selected awards ==
- The New York Public Library Best Books of the Year award for A Continent of Islands: Searching for the Caribbean Destiny (1992)
- James Beard Foundation Award, the New York Public Library Best Books of the Year award, and Glenfiddich Award for Cod: A Biography of the Fish That Changed the World (1998)
- Basque Hall of Fame (2001)
- Honorary ambassadorship from the Basque Government (2001)
- Orbis Pictus Award for The Cod's Tale (2001)
- Pluma Plata award at the Bilbao Book Fair for Salt: A World History (2002)
- ALA Notable Book award for 1968: The Year that Rocked the World (2004)
- ALA Notable Book award for The Story of Salt (2006)
- Bon Appétit Food Writer of the Year award (2006)
- Dayton Literary Peace Prize for Nonviolence: The History of a Dangerous Idea (2007)
- National Parenting Publications Awards – gold award for World Without Fish (2011)
- Robert Laxalt Distinguished Writer award from the Reynolds School of Journalism, University of Nevada, Reno (2012)
- Junior Library Guild selection for Frozen in Time: Clarence Birdseye's Outrageous Idea About Frozen Food (2015)
- André Simon Food and Drink Award, John Avery Award, and IBPA Ben Franklin Gold Award for Nature and Environment Writing for Salmon: A Fish, the Earth, and the History of a Common Fate (2020)
- National Outdoor Book Award for The Unreasonable Virtue of Fly Fishing (2021)
