= The West Wing Thing =

American television podcast

- Show logo. It depicts the Twin Towers of the World Trade Center, draped with the "Practical Idealism" banner from the 1999 West Wing episode "Five Votes Down"
- Genre: Political podcast
- Language: English

Cast and voices
- Hosted by: Dave Anthony; Josh Olson

Music
- Theme music composed by: Collyn McCoy (Diesel Boots)
- Opening theme: "Calling All Wanglords"

Production
- Production: Brian Siano
- Length: typically 60–120 minutes per episode

Technical specifications
- Audio format: MP3

Publication
- No. of seasons: 7
- No. of episodes: 167
- Original release: March 25, 2019 – September 22, 2022
- Provider: All Things Comedy

Related
- Related shows: The Dollop; The Movies That Made Me; Chapo Trap House; Michael And Us; The Audit
- Website: westwingthing.libsyn.com

The West Wing Thing is a progressive media analysis and commentary podcast created and hosted by the screenwriters Dave Anthony and Josh Olson. First uploaded in 2019–22, the series discusses the TV drama The West Wing (1999–2006) on an episode-by-episode basis, from a left-wing political perspective.

Early episodes were recorded in All Things Comedy in Burbank, California prior to the COVID-19 pandemic; later episodes were recorded from the hosts' homes. Heavy metal musician Collyn McCoy ("Diesel Boots") provides the theme tunes, which vary each season, as well as theme tunes for regular sections such as "West Wing Brain," "Misogyny Rundown" and "Psaki Bomb." Guests on the show included David Sirota, John Rogers, Wyatt Cenac, Matt Taibbi, Blaire Erskine, Thomas Frank, Jared Yates Sexton, Abby Martin, Eddie Pepitone, Bilge Ebiri, Lee Camp, Katie Halper, several members of Chapo Trap House, Briahna Joy Gray, Gareth Reynolds, Marianne Williamson, Nathan J. Robinson, Adam McKay, Adolph L. Reed Jr., Wil Anderson and Susan Saxe.

== Episodes ==
=== Season 1 ===
# overall	# in series	Date released	Episode discussed	Guests and other info
1	1	March 25, 2019	"Pilot"	–
2	2	April 1, 2019	"Post Hoc, Ergo Propter Hoc"	–
3	3	April 8, 2019	"A Proportional Response"	–
4	4	April 15, 2019	"Five Votes Down"	–
5	5	April 22, 2019	"The Crackpots and These Women"	–
6	6	April 29, 2019	"Mr. Willis of Ohio"	Title misspelled as "Mr Wills of Ohio"
7	7	May 6, 2019	"The State Dinner"	–
8	8	May 13, 2019	"Enemies"	–
9	9	May 20, 2019	"The Short List"	–
10	10	May 27, 2019	"In Excelsis Deo"	–
11	11	June 3, 2019	"Lord John Marbury"	with Faisal-Azam Qureshi
12	12	June 10, 2019	–	Mid-Season Wrap, with Susan Saxe
13	13	July 22, 2019	"He Shall, from Time to Time..."	–
14	14	July 29, 2019	"Take out the Trash Day"	–
15	15	August 2, 2019	–	"Teaser - A Very Special West Wing Thing"
16	16	August 5, 2019	–	"Our Very Special To Kill A Mockingbird episode", with Chris Wade (Chapo Trap House)
17	17	August 12, 2019	"Take This Sabbath Day"	–
18	18	August 19, 2019	"Celestial Navigation"	–
19	19	August 26, 2019	"20 Hours in L.A."	–
20	20	September 2, 2019	"The White House Pro-Am"	–
21	21	September 9, 2019	"Six Meetings Before Lunch"	–
22	22	September 16, 2019	"Let Bartlet Be Bartlet"	–
23	23	September 23, 2019	"Mandatory Minimums"	–
24	24	September 30, 2019	"Lies, Damn Lies and Statistics"	–
25	25	October 7, 2019	"What Kind of Day Has It Been"	with Luke Savage, author of the famous "How Liberals Fell In Love With The West Wing" article

=== Season 2 ===
# overall	# in series	Date released	Episode discussed	Guests and other info
26	1	January 6, 2020	"In the Shadow of Two Gunmen" (both parts)	with John Rogers
27	2	January 13, 2020	"The Midterms"	–
28	3	January 20, 2020	"In This White House"	–
29	4	January 27, 2020	"And It's Surely to Their Credit"	–
30	5	February 3, 2020	"The Lame Duck Congress"	–
31	6	February 10, 2020	"The Portland Trip"	–
32	7	February 17, 2020	"Shibboleth"	with Katherine Krueger (Splinter) and Will Menaker (Chapo Trap House)
33	8	February 24, 2020	"Galileo"	with Katherine Krueger (Splinter) and Will Menaker (Chapo Trap House)
34	9	March 2, 2020	"Isaac and Ishmael"	"9/11 Special" with Matt Christman (Chapo Trap House); this episode of The West Wing was originally aired before the beginning of Season 3
35	10	March 9, 2020	"Noël"	–
36	11	March 16, 2020	"The Leadership Breakfast"	–
37	12	March 23, 2020	"The Drop-In"	with Alex Press (Jacobin)
38	13	March 30, 2020	"Bartlet's Third State of the Union"	–
39	14	April 6, 2020	"The War at Home"	–
40	15	April 6, 2020	"Ellie"	–
41	16	April 13, 2020	"Somebody's Going to Emergency, Somebody's Going to Jail"	with Luke Savage
42	17	April 13, 2020	"The Stackhouse Filibuster"	with Matt Stoller (Goliath: The Hundred Year War Between Monopoly Power and Democracy)
43	18	April 20, 2020	"17 People"	–
44	19	April 20, 2020	"Bad Moon Rising"	Podcast episode is titled "Bad Title Rising"
45	20	April 27, 2020	"The Fall's Gonna Kill You"	with Tom Sexton (Trillbilly Worker's Party)
46	21	April 27, 2020	"18th and Potomac"	–
47	22	May 4, 2020	"Two Cathedrals"	Podcast episode titled "Are you there God, it’s me, Jed?"; with David Sirota

=== Season 3 ===
# overall	# in series	Date released	Episode discussed	Guests and other info
48	1	May 11, 2020	"Manchester" (both parts)	–
49	2	May 18, 2020	"Ways and Means"	with Amber A'Lee Frost (Chapo Trap House)
50	3	May 25, 2020	"On the Day Before"	–
51	4	June 1, 2020	"War Crimes"	with Tarence Ray (Trillbilly Worker's Party)
52	5	June 8, 2020	"Gone Quiet"	–
53	6	June 15, 2020	"The Indians in the Lobby"	with Wasté'win Young (of the Dakota Access Pipeline protests)
54	7	June 22, 2020	"The Women of Qumar"	with Savanna LaMaison (sex worker and activist)
55	8	June 29, 2020	"Bartlet for America"	–
56	9	July 6, 2020	"H. Con-172"	–
57	10	July 13, 2020	"100,000 Airplanes"	with Oliver Willis (political blogger)
58	11	July 20, 2020	"The Two Bartlets"	with Luke Savage
59	12	July 27, 2020	"Night Five"	–
60	13	August 3, 2020	"Hartsfield's Landing"	with Josh Androsky (Democratic Socialists of America)
61	14	August 10, 2020	"Dead Irish Writers"	with Mary Kate O'Flanagan (screenwriter and story consultant)
62	15	August 17, 2020	"The U.S. Poet Laureate"	with Rachel Joy Larris (Women's Media Center)
63	16	August 24, 2020	"Stirred"	Also contains a listener mailbag
64	17	August 31, 2020	"Enemies Foreign and Domestic"	with Ashley Stevens (Jog For Good)
65	18	September 7, 2020	"The Black Vera Wang"	Podcast episode is titled "Black Vera Wanglord", a reference to the podcast's theme song
66	19	September 14, 2020	"We Killed Yamamoto"	with Katie Halper
67	20	September 21, 2020	"Posse Comitatus"	with Wil Anderson (TOFOP)

=== Season 4 ===
# overall	# in series	Date released	Episode discussed	Guests and other info
68	1	September 28, 2020	"20 Hours in America" (both parts)	with Tarence Ray and Tom Sexton (Trillbilly Worker's Party)
69	2	October 5, 2020	"College Kids"	with Virgil Texas (Chapo Trap House)
70	3	October 12, 2020	"The Red Mass"	with Trevor Beaulieu (Champagne Sharks)
71	4	October 19, 2020	"Debate Camp"	Leslie Lee III and Jack Allison (Struggle Session)
72	5	October 21, 2020	A West Wing Special to Benefit When We All Vote	with Amber A'Lee Frost and Felix Biederman (Chapo Trap House). A vodcast uploaded to Vimeo.
73	6	October 26, 2020	"Game On"	with Briahna Joy Gray (Bad Faith)
74	7	November 2, 2020	"Election Night"	with Briahna Joy Gray; episode released the day before the 2020 United States presidential election
75	8	November 9, 2020	"Process Stories"	with Nando Vila (Weekends)
76	9	November 16, 2020	"Swiss Diplomacy"	—
77	10	November 22, 2020	"Arctic Radar"	with Amber A'Lee Frost (Chapo Trap House)
78	11	November 30, 2020	"Holy Night"	with Nathan J. Robinson (Current Affairs)
79	12	December 7, 2020	"Guns Not Butter"	with Rob Rousseau (49th Parahell)
80	13	December 14, 2020	"The Long Goodbye"	Bored by the West Wing episode, the duo instead decide to discuss the Star Trek: Deep Space Nine episode "Past Tense", renaming the podcast The Star Trek Thing
81	14	December 21, 2020	"Inauguration: Part I"	with Daniel Bessner (Jacobin, advisor to the Bernie Sanders 2020 presidential campaign)
82	15	December 28, 2020	"Inauguration: Over There"	with Daniel Bessner (Jacobin, advisor to the Bernie Sanders 2020 presidential campaign)
83	16	January 4, 2021	"The California 47th"	with Aaron Thorpe (@posadist_trapgd; Trillbilly Worker's Party)
84	17	January 11, 2021	"Red Haven's on Fire"	with Wyatt Cenac (The Daily Show; Wyatt Cenac's Problem Areas)
85	18	January 18, 2021	"Privateers"	with Tanya Turner (Trillbilly Worker's Party)
86	19	January 25, 2021	"Angel Maintenance"	with Ashley Stevens
87	20	February 1, 2021	"Evidence of Things Not Seen"	—
88	21	February 8, 2021	"Life on Mars"	with David Sirota
89	22	February 15, 2021	"Commencement"	with Branko Marcetic (Jacobin)
90	23	February 22, 2021	"Twenty Five"	with Katie Halper and Matt Taibbi (Useful Idiots)

=== Season 5 ===
# overall	# in series	Date released	Episode discussed	Guests and other info
91	1	March 1, 2021	"7A WF 83429"	with Aaron Maté (The Grayzone, The Nation)
92	2	March 8, 2021	"The Dogs of War"	—
93	3	March 15, 2021	"Jefferson Lives"	with Rebecca Bitton (Surviving Limbo)
94	4	March 22, 2021	"Han"	with Daniel Bessner (Jacobin)
95	5	March 29, 2021	"Constituency of One"	with Amy Westervelt (Drilled) and Josh Androsky (Democratic Socialists of America)
96	6	April 5, 2021	"Disaster Relief"	with Robin Marie Averbeck (Liberalism is Not Enough)
97	7	April 9, 2021	—	Crossover with Michael and Us (Luke Savage and Will Sloan) discussing Aaron Sorkin's appearance on RUMBLE with Michael Moore
98	8	April 12, 2021	"Separation of Powers"	with Tom Sexton (Trillbilly Worker's Party)
99	9	April 19, 2021	"Shutdown"	with Briahna Joy Gray and Adam McKay (The Big Short, Vice)
100	10	April 26, 2021	"Abu el Banat"	with Katherine Krueger (Splinter, Elle) and Will Menaker (Chapo Trap House)
101	11	May 3, 2021	"The Stormy Present"	with Felix Biederman (Chapo Trap House)
102	12	May 10, 2021	"The Benign Prerogative"	with Aaron Thorpe (Trillbilly Worker's Party)
103	13	May 17, 2021	"Slow News Day"	with Marianne Williamson (2020 U.S. presidential candidate)
104	14	May 24, 2021	"The Warfare of Genghis Khan"	with Noah Kulwin (Jewish Currents)
105	15	May 31, 2021	"An Khe"	—
106	16	June 7, 2021	"Full Disclosure"	with Pete D'Alessandro (Iowa Bernie Sanders organizer)
107	17	June 14, 2021	"Eppur Si Muove"	with Savannah LaMaison
108	18	June 21, 2021	—	Podcast episode titled "Vamping"; No The West Wing content, as Olson and Anthony just discuss current events
109	19	June 28, 2021	"The Supremes"	with Thomas Frank and Katie Halper
110	20	July 5, 2021	"Access"	Episode entitled "Good Things Happen in Philly", with Susan Saxe
111	21	July 12, 2021	"Talking Points"	—
112	22	July 19, 2021	"No Exit"	—
113	23	July 26, 2021	"Gaza" and "Memorial Day"	with Derek Davison (American Prestige)
114	24	August 9, 2021	"Talking Points" (revisited)	Podcast episode titled "Season 5 wrap up", with Pete D'Alessandro (Iowa Capital Dispatch) and Richard D. Wolff

=== Season 6 ===
# overall	# in series	Date released	Episode(s) discussed	Guests and other info
115	1	August 16, 2021	"NSF Thurmont" and "The Birnam Wood"	with Shanti Singh (Democratic Socialists of America) and Abby Martin
116	2	August 23, 2021	"Third-Day Story"	with Shanti Singh
117	3	August 30, 2021	"Liftoff"	with Lee Camp
118	4	September 6, 2021	"The Hubbert Peak"	with Briahna Joy Gray
119	5	September 13, 2021	"The Dover Test"	—
120	6	September 20, 2021	"A Change Is Gonna Come"	with Daniel Bessner (Jacobin)
121	7	September 27, 2021	"In the Room"	with Meagan Day (Jacobin)
122	8	October 4, 2021	"Impact Winter"	with Josh Androsky (Democratic Socialists of America) and Adolph Reed
123	9	October 11, 2021	"Faith Based Initiative"	—
124	10	October 18, 2021	"Opposition Research"	with Tom Sexton (Trillbilly Worker's Party)
125	11	October 25, 2021	"365 Days"	with Jared Yates Sexton
126	12	November 1, 2021	"King Corn"	with Pete D'Alessandro (Iowa Capital Dispatch)
127	13	November 8, 2021	"The Wake Up Call"	with Amber A'Lee Frost (Chapo Trap House)
128	14	November 15, 2021	—	Podcast episode titled "Hiatus!"; No The West Wing content, as Olson presents a showcase of Diesel Boots songs, including various theme songs for the podcast
129	15	November 22, 2021	—	Podcast episode titled "Mayor Pete Doc special"; No The West Wing content, with Luke Savage and Alex Press (Jacobin)
130	16	December 1, 2021	—	Podcast episode titled "Special mini Crooked Media episode"; No The West Wing content, with Briahna Joy Gray
131	17	December 6, 2021	"Freedonia"	—
132	18	December 13, 2021	"Drought Conditions"	with Jen Briney (Congressional Dish)
133	19	December 20, 2021	"A Good Day"	with Matt Stoller (Goliath: The Hundred Year War Between Monopoly Power and Democracy)
134	20	December 27, 2021	"La Palabra"	with Eddie Pepitone
135	21	January 3, 2022	"Ninety Miles Away"	with Gareth Reynolds
136	22	January 10, 2022	"In God We Trust"	with James Fritz (comedian) and Justin Feldman (epidemiologist)
137	23	January 17, 2022	"Things Fall Apart"	Podcast episode titled "Things ACTUALLY Fall Apart"; with Kate Willett (Dirtbag Anthropology)
138	24	January 24, 2022	"2162 Votes"	with Walker Bragman (Paste, Jacobin)
139	25	January 31, 2022	—	Podcast episode titled "Meet our free floating agent of chaos!", with Brian Siano, the podcast's researcher
140	26	February 7, 2022	—	Podcast episode titled "The Hillary Clinton Master Class Part 1", with Amber A'Lee Frost (Chapo Trap House) and Catherine Liu (Virtue Hoarders: The Case Against the Professional Managerial Class)
141	27	February 14, 2022	—	Podcast episode titled "The Hillary Clinton Master Class Part 2", with Julia Claire and Kate Willett (Reply Guys)
142	28	February 21, 2022	—	Podcast episode titled "The Hillary Clinton Master Class Part 3", with Tom Sexton and Aaron Thorpe (Trillbilly Workers Party)
143	29	February 28, 2022	—	Podcast episode titled "The Hillary Clinton Master Class Part 4", with Ashley Stevens and Meagan Day (Jacobin)
144	30	March 7, 2022	—	Podcast episode titled "The Hillary Clinton Master Class Part 5", with Briahna Joy Gray, Katie Halper and Lee Camp

=== Season 7 ===
# overall	# in series	Date released	Episode(s) discussed	Guests and other info
145	1	March 14, 2022	"The Ticket"	with Kath Barbadoro (comedian)
146	2	March 21, 2022	"The Mommy Problem"	Podcast episode titled "Mommy Problem"; with Derek Davison and Daniel Bessner (American Prestige)
147	3	March 28, 2022	"Message of the Week"	with Alex Fumero (writer and producer)
148	4	April 4, 2022	"Mr. Frost"	Podcast episode titled "The Leak"
149	5	April 11, 2022	"Here Today"	with Pete D'Alessandro (Iowa Capital Dispatch)
150	6	April 18, 2022	"The Al Smith Dinner"	with Lisa Curry (Long Story Long)
151	7	April 25, 2022	—	Review of The Trial of the Chicago 7, with Danny Bessner (Jacobin) and Bilge Ebiri
152	8	May 2, 2022	"The Debate"	with Matt Christman (Chapo Trap House)
153	9	May 9, 2022	"Undecideds"	with Vida Starr and Trevor Beaulieu (Champagne Sharks)
154	10	May 16, 2022	"The Wedding"	with Will Menaker (Chapo Trap House)
155	11	May 23, 2022	"Running Mates"	with Lisa Curry (Long Story Long)
156	12	May 30, 2022	"Internal Displacement"	with Ashley Stevens (Jog For Good)
157	13	June 20, 2022	"Duck and Cover"	with Gareth Reynolds (The Dollop)
158	14	June 27, 2022	"The Cold"	with Tom Sexton (Trillbilly Worker's Party)
159	15	June 29, 2022	"Two Weeks Out"	with Jared Yates Sexton
160	16	July 18, 2022	"Welcome to Wherever You Are"	with Luke Savage and Blaire Erskine
161	17	July 25, 2022	"Election Day" (both parts)	with Katie Halper
162	18	August 1, 2022	"Requiem"	with Vida Starr and Trevor Beaulieu (Champagne Sharks)
163	19	August 8, 2022	"Transition"	with Wil Anderson
164	20	August 15, 2022	—	Review of "We Just Decided To", pilot episode of The Newsroom; with Wil Anderson
165	21	August 17, 2022	"The Last Hurrah"	with Pete D'Alessandro (Iowa activist) and David Sirota
166	22	August 23, 2022	"Institutional Memory"	with Nima Shirazi and Adam Johnson (Citations Needed)
167	23	August 29, 2022	"Tomorrow"	a 3:12 episode consisting of the intro song, a brief observation that there was no political content in the episode, and the outro song
168	24	August 31, 2022	"Tomorrow"	with Briahna Joy Gray
169	25	September 22, 2022	—	"Special Appendix Episode - What's the deal with Louise Mensch?"; with Arthur Tiersky (screenwriter)

== Reception ==
Writing for Book and Film Globe, Kevin L. Jones praised The West Wing Thing, saying that the hosts "gleefully tear apart each episode of the West Wing for its smugness and centrist politics and I’m all for it. And they don’t just troll the show either; they lay down a solid case for every criticism they lob. They know how show business works, they know their American history […] and they’re certain they know who’s to blame for all of the West Wing’s issues: West Wing creator Aaron Sorkin."

In Fast Company, Joe Berkowitz wrote that "Anthony and Olson don’t approach their subject with reverence. Instead, their aim is to present The West Wing as a singularly corrosive force in American politics that has perpetuated incalculable and irreparable harm on society," saying that they "offer a compelling counter-narrative to the series’ nostalgia-soaked civic celebration."

Veteran Irish journalist and former Washington correspondent Carole Coleman described The West Wing Thing as "irreverent and very funny." Irish newspaper the Athlone Advertiser said, "If you find Aaron Sorkin's smug, centrist, sexist, childish waffle infuriating you can listen along to the podcast and watch a few episodes — which is what I have been doing and finding it quite cathartic."

== See also ==
- The Dollop
- The West Wing Weekly
- Political podcast
