= Walking the Room =

Comedy podcast

- Genre: Comedy
- Language: English

Cast and voices
- Hosted by: Greg Behrendt; Dave Anthony

Production
- Production: Dave Anthony
- Length: 1 Hour

Publication
- No. of episodes: 206
- Original release: May 24, 2010 – April 10, 2015
- Updates: Mondays

Walking the Room was a comedy podcast hosted by American comedians Greg Behrendt and Dave Anthony. The free, hour-long weekly show debuted via web and iTunes on May 24, 2010, and was recorded in Behrendt's closet in Los Angeles, California. Each episode was broken into three segments that typically involve rants and banter between the hosts, but occasional guests have included Patton Oswalt, Karen Kilgariff, Brian Posehn, Jimmy Pardo, Jonah Ray, Brendon Walsh, Jen Kirkman and TOFOP hosts Wil Anderson and Charlie Clausen. Anthony produced and edited the show. Behrendt originally created the opening theme, “Estoy Podcuddle,” under the name HoboTang, and most of the music played on the show is performed by his band, The Reigning Monarchs. The podcast ceased regular production in October 2014 following an extended hiatus. In April 2015, a final episode was recorded from the Melbourne Comedy Festival and released a few days later.

== History ==
Dave Anthony, a stand-up comedian, writer and actor, wanted to start a comedy podcast that did not revolve around interviewing guests. He recorded two episodes based on his blog, Stop All Monsters, which he hosted solo, but felt it needed something more. He pitched the idea of co-hosting to his long-time friend, Greg Behrendt. The two had met during their early stand-up days in San Francisco, and had previously worked together in radio as well as on The Greg Behrendt Show.

Behrendt had gained success when his consultant position on Sex and the City led to his co-authoring the book He's Just Not That Into You. The book became a New York Times Best-Seller, landed Behrendt an appearance on The Oprah Winfrey Show, and was later turned into a feature film. Behrendt always considered himself a stand-up comedian first and foremost, and agreed to co-host with Anthony. They began recording Walking the Room in Behrendt's bedroom for the first 10 episodes, then relocated to the now-trademark closet to improve the show's sound quality.

In July 2014 the podcast went on an extended hiatus while Behrendt was working in New York City. Several guest episodes and a compilation of excerpts from live shows were aired over the summer. In October 2014 various postings on social media pages related to Behrendt, Anthony and the podcast indicated that the podcast was over. Anthony later clarified that he had ended it for unspecified reasons but also as a reaction to changes in his own life and career.

In January 2015, a live reunion podcast was announced for the 2015 Melbourne Comedy Festival in Australia.

== Premise, fans and terminology ==
The show not only revolved around the actual lives of hosts Anthony and Behrendt, but the universe they’d created through expanding that reality into absurdity, often through the use of nicknames and catchphrases. The most notable recurring storylines involved the chronicles of Anthony's neighborhood, but topics ranged from comedy and show business (like a story about Dane Cook casually trying to steal one of Behrendt's classic bits), to family life, prison and candy (particularly Australian biscuits, Tim Tams).

Walking the Room labelled itself a "podcuddle," and its hardcore fans, known as “Cuddlahs” (or “Customers”), were described as “Clown from the Neck Down.” The show built upon itself more than most podcasts, which can be attributed to their ever-evolving real-life cliffhangers, as well as the podcuddle-specific language they continually generated. The show's official website, designed by Damien Schaefer and launched on April 17, 2011, provides a glossary, written by Vicky Pezza, to help new listeners navigate the dialogue.

From the beginning, the show was heavily promoted and endorsed by comedian Patton Oswalt, and on May 8, 2011, artist Keegan Wenkman released four commemorative posters depicting some of the show's most iconic images in honor of Oswalt's long-anticipated guest appearance on their 50th episode.

Additionally, crossovers with Walking the Room’s sister podcast, TOFOP (formerly Thirty Odd Foot of Pod), hosted by comedian Wil Anderson and actor Charlie Clausen, helped the show gain a following in their native country of Australia.

In response to the amount of candy the hosts began to receive from fans, they created minute-long video shorts entitled That Candy Thing with Greg and Dave where they reviewed the treats on-camera. A video was released each week.

== The Starfish Circus ==
A “Starfish Circus” was a live Walking the Room event hosted by Anthony and Behrendt. The shows feature their stand-up as well as other comedian guests and a musical performance by The Reigning Monarchs. The title “Starfish Circus” references a more literal event as imagined by the hosts in episode #6 of the podcast (“Not Knowing Hetfield & Pre-School Graduation"). Event artwork is created by Paul “Wiseacre” Armstrong and merchandise is designed by Joseph Angelo Warner.

Event Number	Date	Location/Venue	Guests
1	June 27, 2011	Largo, Los Angeles	Wil Anderson, Patton Oswalt, Brian Posehn.
2	September 26, 2011	Largo, Los Angeles	Jimmy Pardo, Karen Kilgariff, Kyle Kinane
3	December 19, 2011	Largo, Los Angeles	Patton Oswalt, Karen Kilgariff, Aimee Mann
4	March 10, 2012	The Bell House, Brooklyn	Sam Zayvan, Nikki Glaser, Karen Kilgariff, Todd Barry, Rhett Miller
5	February 2, 2013	The Bell House, Brooklyn	Janeane Garofalo, Wil Anderson.
6	March 29, 2014	The Bell House, Brooklyn	Judah Friedlander, Anya Marina, Marc Normand, Bill Nye.
