= Dave Anthony =

American comedian (born 1967)

- Anthony in 2020
- Born: David Sean Anthony; August 26, 1967 (age 59); Marin County, California, U.S.
- Occupations: Comedian; actor; screenwriter; podcaster
- Spouse: Heather Anthony (m. 2006)
- Children: 1

David Sean Anthony (born August 26, 1967) is an American comedian, actor, screenwriter, and podcaster. He is best known as the creator and co-host of the comedy podcast The Dollop, in which he tells notable stories from American history to his friend and fellow comedian Gareth Reynolds, who has not heard the story before. The pair have a second podcast, The Past Times, where Anthony picks a paper from a day in history and reads it to Reynolds and a special guest. Since 2019, Anthony has also co-hosted the podcast The Audit with writer Josh Olson.

== Early life ==
David Sean Anthony was born in Marin County, California, on August 26, 1967, the son of a hairdresser mother and lawyer father. He grew up in San Anselmo, California. His ancestors were Irish immigrants. He has one sister, Pam, who is two years older. Both parents neglected him when he was growing up, which he later attributed to the alcoholism of both his father and maternal grandparents, though his mother was not an alcoholic. In one instance, his father was reprimanded in court for showing up too drunk to represent his client, leading to the postponement of the trial. The couple divorced when Anthony was in second grade. Unlike most of Marin County, home to some of the richest Americans, Anthony's family had far less money. He graduated from Marin Catholic High School and earned a degree in physical geography from the University of California, Santa Barbara.

From age five, Anthony knew he wanted to be a comedian. As a child, he would stay awake to watch comedians on The Tonight Show Starring Johnny Carson and enjoyed watching Evening at the Improv and Saturday Night Live. He grew up listening to the comedy albums of comedians such as Richard Pryor and the fact that Robin Williams was also from Marin County was significant to him. He first performed stand-up at the age of 23.

== Career ==
=== Stand-up ===
Anthony began his career as a stand-up comedian in San Francisco in 1989, performing for the next five years. He then lived and performed in New York City for four years before settling in Los Angeles. He became a regular at the Holy City Zoo in San Francisco.

Anthony has performed stand-up comedy on various late-night shows, including Jimmy Kimmel Live and The Late Late Show, as well as on Comedy Central. He has performed stand-up in every state in the continental US and all over the world, including the Just for Laughs Montreal Comedy Festival and the Melbourne International Comedy Festival. In 2015, the Melbourne Herald Sun gave his show "Hot Head" a 4-star review and called it "hugely enjoyable." Also in 2015, he appeared on the nationally televised Cracker Night as part of Sydney Comedy Festival 2015. His 2015 comedy tour and subsequent album, Hot Head, were based around his difficult childhood. He has released two comedy albums, Hot Head and Shame Chamber. Both albums charted on the Billboard Comedy Album Chart -- Hot Head at #4 and Shame Chamber at #5.

=== Television ===
Anthony has acted in television shows, films, and commercials. Television programs he has appeared on include The Office, Scare Tactics, Arrested Development, Maron, Hello Ladies, Boston Legal, Veep, Hidden America with Jonah Ray, Comedy Bang Bang, and Entourage. He was a panelist twice on @midnight.

In 2006, Anthony's first staff writing job was on The Greg Behrendt Show, a daytime syndicated talk show. He also appeared on the show playing comedic characters, including the recurring character Waffle Man. He has also worked on several pilots with Bob Odenkirk.

Anthony had multiple job titles on the show Maron on IFC. He played an exaggerated version of himself, and his wife was played by Amy Smart. In the show's second season, he was added as a staff writer. He became the show's story editor in the fourth season and directed an episode.

=== Writing ===
Anthony has written for many different mediums. He was the political editor for SuicideGirls, wrote for the Comedy Film Nerds website, and had a blog called Stop All Monsters. As a television writer, he has written for Talking Dead, Between Two Ferns with Zach Galifianakis, Pretend Time, and The Greg Behrendt Show.

In 2015, Anthony was nominated for a Writers Guild of America Award for Outstanding Script in the category of Episodic Comedy for writing the Maron episode "Racegate." In 2019, he wrote an episode of Deadly Class for Syfy and was credited as a co-producer. He was a story consultant on the scripted audio drama Bronzeville written by Josh Olson and starring Laurence Fishburne. He has written a screenplay based on the Piedras Negras jailbreak.

=== Podcasting ===
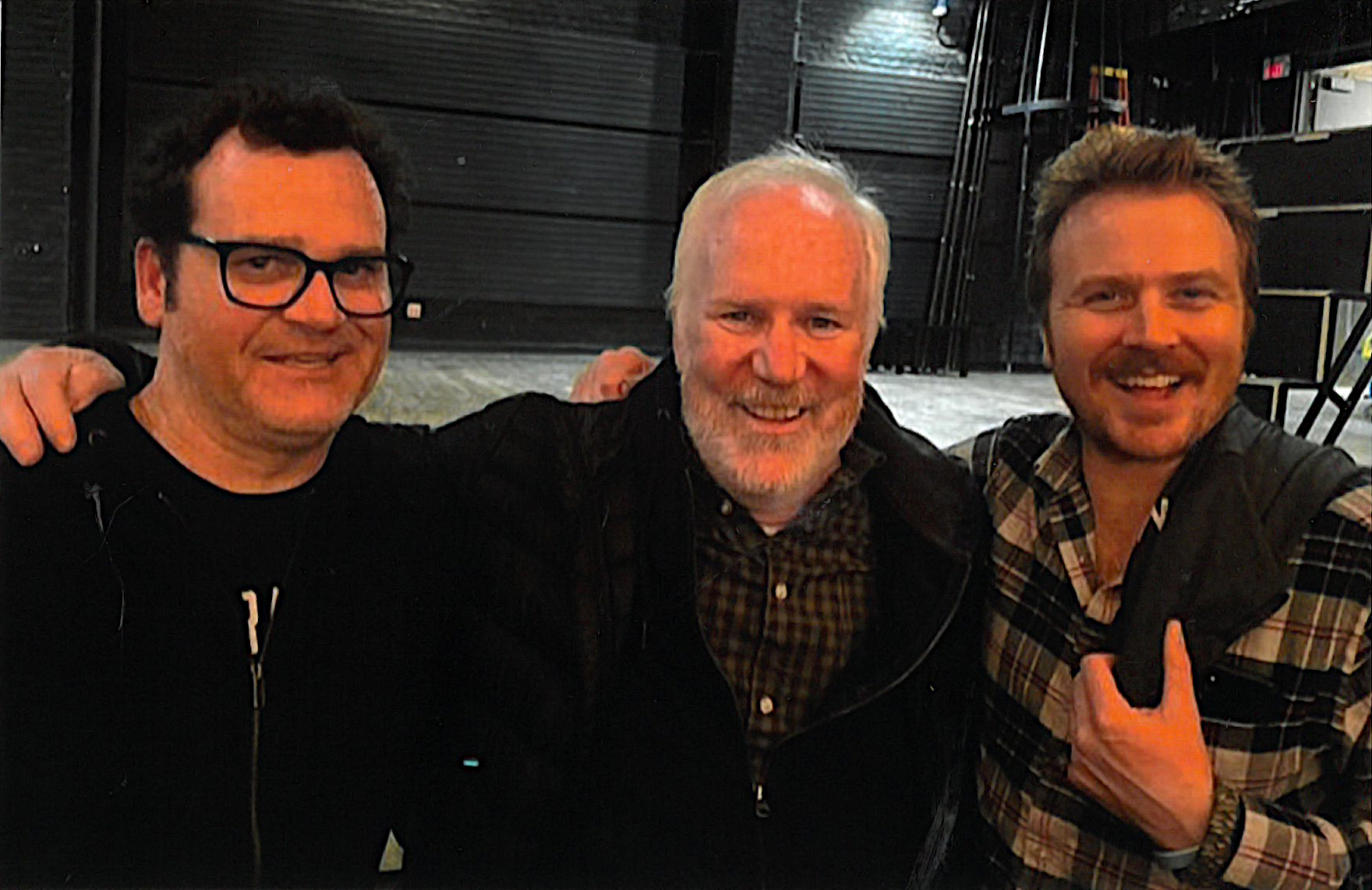
Anthony (left) with comedian Bill Corbett and Dollop cohost Gareth Reynolds, 2020

In 2009, Anthony's son was born and Anthony became a stay-at-home dad. Around the same time, he began to feel like he was washed up and would never achieve his career goals. After listening to the podcast Uhh Yeah Dude, he was inspired to start his own podcast. He approached his friend, comedian Greg Behrendt, with whom he had hosted an internet radio show called Manversation on Comedy World Radio in 2001. Together, they hosted the podcast Walking the Room from 2010 to 2014. Anthony was the producer and editor of the show, which was named one of the AV Club's best podcasts of 2012. The podcast was recorded in Behrendt's closet for sound quality. The pair started referring to the podcast as a "podcuddle" and listeners as "cuddlaz". On the podcast, they discussed their disillusionment with their careers and decided to "just tell the truth about everything." They shared stories from their lives and Anthony contributed tales about his wacky neighbors. This led to the pair coining the new word "hobotang." which is listed in Urban Dictionary.

When Anthony and Behrendt learned that a podcast in Australia called TOFOP had a similar vibe to their podcast, they invited the hosts, Wil Anderson and Charlie Clausen, to be guests on Walking the Room. This collaboration led to Walking the Room gaining a significant following in Australia. In 2012, Anthony and Behrendt appeared on stage with Anderson and Clausen during the Melbourne International Comedy Festival in an event billed as Superpod. The Festival immediately lost the recording, and the four podcasters discussed the loss that night on the episode "The Death of Superpod."

Anthony regularly appears as a guest on other podcasts, including FOFOP, a podcast started by Wil Anderson when his TOFOP cohost, Charlie Clausen, was unavailable to record for an extended period. Anthony was the first guest host, resulting in the nickname "Guest Charlie Number One." Anthony guested on The Naughty Show podcast, where Gareth Reynolds was a co-host. The pair hit it off, and Anthony invited Reynolds to fill in for Behrendt on Walking the Room a couple of times. Anthony has said that Reynolds is the funniest person he knows.

As Walking the Room was coming to an end, Anthony started a new podcast called The Dollop. He was tired of talking about himself and decided that the new podcast would be more structured. The original plan was to have a different comedian sit in each week, and Anthony invited Reynolds to be the first guest. As soon as fans heard the episode, they overwhelmingly told Anthony to stick with Reynolds as his permanent co-host. The Dollop is on the All Things Comedy network.

On The Dollop, Anthony presents an event or person from American history that he has researched to Reynolds, who usually has no idea what the topic is going to be about. Reynolds then reacts to the story, and the pair improvise as they go. When they tour, Anthony presents a topic from the state or country they are in. Fans of the show have taken to calling themselves "Rubes" in homage to one of the podcast's early subjects, baseball player Rube Waddell. The Dollop has toured across the United States, Europe, and Australia, where live podcast performances have repeatedly sold out theaters.

Anthony often frames stories from the point of view of laborers, enslaved people, women, and the poor. He credits Howard Zinn's book A People's History of the United States, which he first read in high school, for "radicalizing" him.

Anthony and Gareth Reynolds have a second podcast, The Past Times, where Anthony picks a paper from a day in history and reads it to Gareth Reynolds and a special guest. The pair have collaborated on a number of projects, including a book based on their podcast titled The United States of Absurdity: Untold Stories from American History, which was released in 2017. They put out a limited-run series of England and UK Dollop episodes. They also made a web series called Trash Toons, in which they watched and discussed old cartoons, and put out webcasts of political coverage. In 2020, they did a special episode of The Dollop on Comedy Gives Back to raise money for comedians whose careers were affected by the COVID-19 pandemic.

From 2019 to 2022, Anthony co-hosted the podcast The West Wing Thing with writer Josh Olson. The hosts discussed the politics of the TV show The West Wing from a leftist perspective and the effect it had on modern politics.

==== LA Podfest ====
After fans of Anthony's podcast Walking the Room flew from around the world to be at a live show, Anthony thought this could be something bigger. In 2012, Anthony; Graham Elwood, and Chris Mancini of the Comedy Film Nerds podcast; and Andy Wood founded the Los Angeles Podcast Festival.

The podcast festival ran for six years and featured many comedians, including Marc Maron, Aisha Tyler, Doug Benson, Greg Proops, and Paul F. Tompkins. My Favorite Murder taped its first-ever live broadcast at the festival. Their guest to tell a hometown murder story was Anthony, who talked about a serial killer who stalked women on hiking trails near San Francisco. After the Sofitel Los Angeles hotel in Beverly Hills put a member of the Podfest community's safety at risk, the festival moved venues, and Anthony publicly recommended against staying at the hotel.

==== Plagiarism allegations ====
On July 9, 2015, Alan Bellows posted a letter accusing Anthony of plagiarizing Damn Interesting's content for use on The Dollop. In a response on Reddit, Anthony said that he had made a mistake and apologized for not attributing the stories properly but claimed that this did not constitute plagiarism. Writing about the incident for Plagiarism Today, author Jonathan Bailey concluded that although there was no reason to suppose that Anthony had intended to plagiarize, "there is no debate that the podcast took text and facts written by others and used them, often verbatim, without attribution. That is the definition of plagiarism."

On August 25, 2019, Josh Levin posted a thread to Twitter accusing Anthony of plagiarizing one of Levin's articles for a Dollop show at Chicago's Athenaeum Theatre in 2017. Levin's article was cited by The Dollop in the show notes but was not mentioned in the recording. Levin stated that there was no way to click on the sources in the episode description, but it was then shown that Levin did not have the setting correct on his phone and that the sources were easily accessible. In a reply to the thread, author Paul Brown stated that The Dollop had also plagiarized sections of his book The Rocketbelt Caper for a 2017 episode. Brown's book was cited in The Dollop show notes but not mentioned on the recording.

The Dollop hosts have stated it is a fair use podcast. Anthony told the San Francisco Chronicle, "We want people to find the source material and know who's writing it. The whole reason I'm doing the podcast is to get these stories out there because they're important."

== Activism ==
Anthony is strongly anti-capitalist and traces many of America's problems back to capitalism. He has said that he uses his platform to turn more people against capitalism, and claims to have gotten feedback confirming that it is working.

In 2020, Anthony backed Nithya Raman for Los Angeles City Council. He encourages others to become involved in local politics, believing it is a better way to effect change than focusing on national politics. He is a member of the Democratic Socialists of America.

Another issue of deep importance to Anthony is climate change. He has spoken about his fears for the planet as a whole and for his own child's future. He actively protests against new construction that is detrimental to the environment. Anthony, with his Dollop co-host Reynolds, formed a group called Plan It Change 10. The group's mission, as stated on its Facebook page, is to "get people who want to fight climate change together into groups in their cities and towns and turn our fear into action and art."

Anthony often stresses his belief on his podcast and in interviews that marching against something is not effective by itself. He believes people must "put pressure on authorities, get in their faces, and yell at them." He strongly supports workers and unions going on strike.

== Personal life ==
Anthony was engaged to a woman whose identity has not been disclosed, and once even paid off her father's debts to the mafia to stop him from getting his leg broken, but the engagement later ended. Around this time, he began attending Al Anon meetings.

Since 2006, Anthony has been married to Heather, a doctor of psychology. They have a son together and three labradoodles named Maple, Larry, and Pablo.

== Filmography ==
=== Actor ===
| Title | Year | Role |
|---|---|---|
| Veep | 2016 | Reporter |
| Hidden America with Jonah Ray | 2016 | Gareth |
| Director's Cut | 2016 | Richard Speck |
| Comedy Bang Bang | 2015 | Pranked Guy |
| Hello Ladies | 2014 | Dave |
| Maron | 2013–2016 | Self |
| The Office | 2011 | Businessman |
| Men of a Certain Age | 2011 | Customer |
| Crocodile Tears (Funny or Die short) | 2011 | Director |
| Entourage | 2009 | Showrunner No. 2 |
| Recount | 2008 | Florida Stay Reporter |
| Magnetic Poles (short) | 2006 | Matteo |
| Las Vegas | 2006 | Jason |
| Boston Legal | 2005 | Technician |
| Scare Tactics | 2003 | Dave / Meteor Man / Repo Man |

=== Media appearances ===
| Title | Year | Role |
|---|---|---|
| The West Wing Thing | 2019–2022 | Cohost |
| My Favorite Murder | 2016 | Guest on live episode from LA Podcast Festival |
| The Dollop | 2014–present | |
| TOFOP | 2013–present | |
| The Naughty Show | 2012 | |
| Never Not Funny | 2011 | |
| Sklarbro Country | 2011 | |
| TOFOP | 2011 | |
| WTF with Marc Maron | 2010 | |
| Jimmy Kimmel Live! | 2004 | |
| The Late Late Show with Craig Kilborn | 2002 | |
| Late Friday | 2001 | |
