= The Lexington Six =

LGBTQ activist group

The Lexington Six was a group of six young LGBT activists in Kentucky who, in 1975, were subpoenaed to testify regarding their connection to a bank robbery in Massachusetts in 1970. Although the six did not have previous associations with one another, they were questioned by the FBI around the same time. After refusing to testify in front of a grand jury became a united front for LGBTQ and anti-war activism in Lexington. The six were arrested and outed to their families, and all six spent various amounts of time in local county jails for contempt of court.

The six included five lesbian women and one gay man, all of whom were current or former students at the University of Kentucky. Their names were Gail Cohee (aged 21), Deborah 'Debbie' Hands (aged 22), Linda Link (aged 22), Jill Raymond (aged 23), Marla Seymour (aged 22), and James Carey Junkin (aged 19). Besides Link, who was from Louisville, the remaining five hailed from Lexington, Kentucky.

== Background and questioning ==
In the fall of 1974, a student at the University of Kentucky recognized Susan Edith Saxe and Katherine Ann Power (with aliases Lena and Mae, which they acquired in there time spent in Connecticut) in a binder for the FBI's Most-Wanted list. The two had robbed State Street Bank and Trust in Brighton, Massachusetts in 1970. During the robbery, Boston police officer Walter Schroeder was shot and killed, and the pair escaped with $26,000, which they planned to use to overthrow the federal government. While on the run, Saxe and Power eventually traveled to Kentucky, where they joined a Lexington-based lesbian feminist collective. Saxe and Power lived near The University of Kentucky Campus for around two months in the summer of 1974. When Saxe and Power left Lexington, the FBI began questioning the local gay and lesbian community in order to determine their whereabouts as they were the only two left of the robbery team that had yet to be apprehended and they were subsequently put on the FBI's Most Wanted List.

Sall Kundert, a woman associated with Lena and Mae (the originally known names of the fugitives) and the lesbian feminist community, informed Marla Seymour and Gail Cohee that the FBI was questioning the community and wanted them to be aware of their rights when questioned and that they were allowed to stay silent if they wanted to. Carey Junkin, the next to be questioned, had lived in the same building as Lena and Mae, but had no association with them beyond that. In solidarity with the community, Junkin refused to answer any questions. Jill Raymond had already had an open FBI file on her for her participation in anti-war protests in the area, so with the warning from Kundert, she had been prepared for the interrogation.

The attorney for the six, Robert Sedler, released a statement before the group was subpoenaed, saying none of the six had known Lena or May were fugitives, nor did they know either of their whereabouts.

== Grand jury ==
On March 6, 1975, Hands, Junkin, and Seymour were to appear in front a grand jury, but the three refused to say anything beyond confirming their addresses as they felt that they were experiencing lifestyle harassment of their 5th amendment right to self incrimination. The jury continued to following day, with U.S. District Court Judge Bernard T. Moynahan suspending the trio's right to remain silent as they again refused to answer whether they had met Lena or May.

Defense attorney Robert Sedler argued that the court was in the wrong for holding the six in contempt of court, as the issue at hand was determining the location of a fugitive, rather than indicting a criminal. Furthermore, Sedler argued, by allowing a grand jury to occur on the grounds that it might allow authorities to discover crimes meant "the grand jury could be used for whatever purpose the government might want".

The six were jailed on March 8 following their refusal to testify.

In 1975 Jaymond refused to cooperate with the grand jury investigation that was related to Susan Saxe and Kathy Power. Because she failed to cooperate, they decided to use jail time to try and force her cooperation. She remained in jail for the entire 18 months due to the failure of willingness to speak. She finally got out at midnight of May 3, 1976, and her time was used as a symbol for activists who believed the government was abusing its power. Even Raymond said she believed her time in jail was worth it due to what came out of it.

== Imprisonment ==
Following the trial, the six were sentenced to jail and placed specifically in separate jails across the state in an attempt to emotionally wear down the members. Jill Raymond and Gail Cohee were taken to Bell County Jail in Pineville, Kentucky; Carey Junkin and Debbie Hands to Madison County Jail, and finally, Linda Link and Marla Seymour to Franklin County Jail in Frankfort, Kentucky.

Although their case was on the federal level, they were sent to county jails, which were considered worse conditions than federal prison, once again in an attempt to wear down their minds and bodies. This separation was especially hard for both Marla Seymour and Gail Cohee, who were known lovers at the time.

Hands agreed to testify after spending six days in Madison County Jail as she felt that the mental and physical toll the staying in prison on her body would be too great. Hands testified for 3-4 hours on March 14, and was released soon after as she told the jury that she didn't feel she was protecting fugitives but protecting her own rights by attempting to not purger herself. Junkin was freed on March 31 after agreeing to testify.

On April 1, around 100 people, primarily students at the University of Kentucky, held a rally and march to protest the imprisonment of the four remaining members of the six. Several days later, a writer for United Press International, David E. Anderson, expressed support for the six, saying they were "guilty of nothing other than protecting their privacy," and theorized that the FBI targeted the six because of their associations with the "women's movement".

On April 10, attorneys for the six requested the 6th U.S. Circuit Court of Appeals to overturn the contempt of court citations. On April 29, the court ordered Judge Moynahan to set bail for the remaining four and to re-open the case.

In subsequent months, three of the remaining women in jail agreed to testify and were released. By August 1975, the only member of the six still in jail was Jill Raymond. That month, she spoke to a reporter about the lack of privacy for inmates at Franklin County Jail, where she was being housed. Following the release of the story she was transferred to Madison County Jail.

In late September 1975, the National Organization of Women held vigils in Louisville and Lexington in support of Raymond. In October, Raymond appealed to the U.S. Supreme Court to be released on bail while she appealed her case; her request was rejected as it already has been in August.

Supporters of Raymond held another protest on March 1, 1976, at the Fayette County Courthouse, during which they held a mock trial in which they charged the federal prosecutor, FBI, and grand jury with "conspiring to overthrow the democratic rights of the American people".

Raymond was finally released on May 3, 1976.
