= Marycrest =

Marycrest may refer to:

- Marycrest Girls High School, Denver, Colorado
- Marycrest College Historic District, Davenport, Iowa
