= Uhh Yeah Dude =

Comedy podcast

- Genre: Comedy
- Language: English

Cast and voices
- Hosted by: Seth Romatelli; Jonathan Larroquette

Production
- Production: Jonathan Larroquette
- Length: 1 Hour Approx.

Technical specifications
- Audio format: MP3

Publication
- Original release: February 11, 2006
- Updates: weekly

Related
- Website: www.uhhyeahdude.com

Uhh Yeah Dude is a comedy podcast hosted by Seth Romatelli (born September 20, 1973) and Jonathan Larroquette (born August 7, 1977). Episodes have generally aired once a week since 2006, and run about an hour long. The podcast is described as "A weekly roundup of America through the eyes of two American-Americans".

== Overview ==
Uhh Yeah Dude is a twice-weekly hour-long comedy podcast containing discussion about current events by hosts Seth Romatelli and Jonathan Larroquette, the son of Night Court, The Librarians, and Texas Chainsaw Massacre star John Larroquette. The original idea for the podcast came out of weekly phone conversations between the two where they would talk about personal experiences and items they had seen in the news. The two had joked about recording their conversations and, after a year or so, Larroquette suggested they record it and turn it into a podcast.

The exact content of each show varies but episodes typically include items from popular culture, "news of the weird" stories, results from scientific studies, personal anecdotes and a range of other material. Current events or major news stories are rarely discussed. Over time certain themes or topics have recurred (both intentionally and accidentally). The show also features its own unique vocabulary which has been described as "a combination of repurposed hip-hop patois and bro-speak".

The first episode of Uhh Yeah Dude aired on February 11, 2006. The duo typically record two episodes weekly in Romatelli's home in South Hollywood. The two have also done live shows in many cities including Los Angeles, Portland, Seattle, Brooklyn, Dallas, and Boston.

Some have credited the podcast's intimacy and the hosts' accessibility as part of its appeal. The two have spoken candidly about their neuroses and personal lives. At one point Larroquette gave out his personal phone number and answered calls and texts from fans. The show's listeners are also encouraged to call a dedicated 1-800 number and leave a voicemail which Romatelli monitors and often responds to personally.

The podcast is also somewhat unusual for not featuring guests. Romatelli described this as a conscious decision to not have a show involving "listening to this person get interviewed for the 35th time about how awesome and rich they are." The one guest the podcast has featured is Romatelli's mother who has hosted along with her son on several episodes.

An archive of old episodes is available on Patreon.

== Reception ==
Uhh Yeah Dude has received positive reviews in a number of publications including Rolling Stone, Paste Magazine, IFC and Los Angeles Magazine. In July 2013 the show was featured in a segment on New Zealand's TV3 calling them "America's funniest podcast."

It has also been recognized by other podcasters as one of the original comedy podcasts. The duo were featured in an episode of WTF with Marc Maron where Maron called them "pioneers, godfathers; one of the original podcasts." Comedian Dave Anthony has cited them as an inspiration for his own Walking the Room podcast.
