= Book tour =

Type of promotional campaign

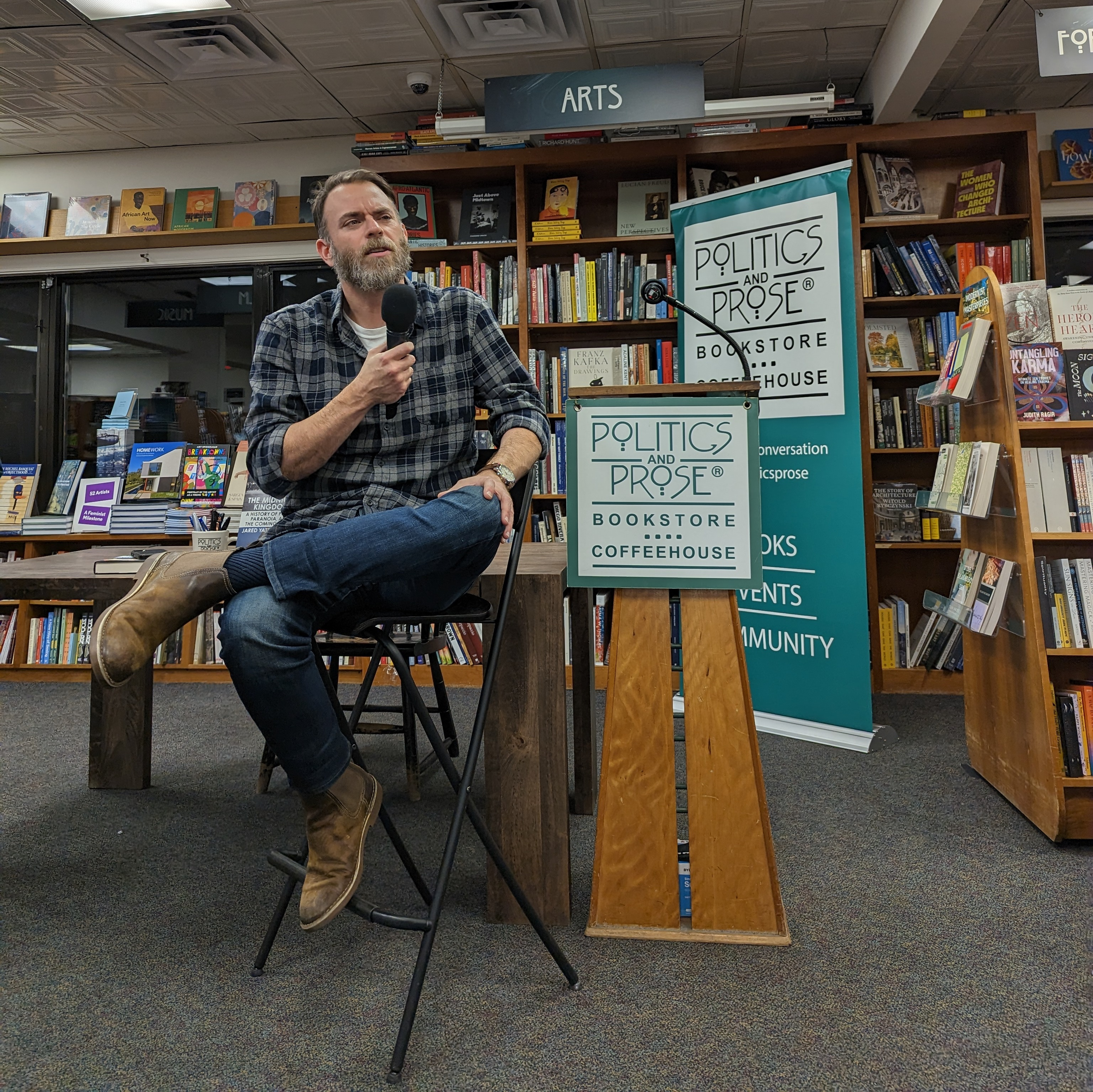
Author Jared Yates Sexton giving a talk at Politics and Prose as part of his book tour

A book tour is a promotion for a newly published book in which the author tours a region to do bookselling, present to the media, and meet the people who would read the book. Three objectives of any presentation on a book tour are to entertain the audience, serve the interest of whichever institution is hosting the presentation, and to sell books in person at the presentation. Authors have a range of opinions about the effectiveness of book tours.

Higher profile writers sometimes do tours with an escort to help them manage interaction with the audience during presentations.

Book tours have become less common since the 2008 Great Recession.
