= Related =

American comedy-drama television series (2005–2006)

- Genre: Comedy drama
- Created by: Liz Tuccillo
- Starring: Jennifer Esposito; Kiele Sanchez; Lizzy Caplan; Laura Breckenridge; Callum Blue
- Opening theme: "Related" performed by the Veronicas
- Composer: Blake Neely
- Country of origin: United States
- Original language: English
- No. of seasons: 1
- No. of episodes: 18

Production
- Executive producers: Steve Pearlman; Marta Kauffman; Andrew Plotkin; Lee Ross
- Producer: Robert Lloyd Lewis
- Running time: 60 minutes
- Production companies: More Horses Productions; Class IV Productions; Warner Bros. Television

Original release
- Network: The WB
- Release: October 5, 2005 – March 20, 2006

Related is an American comedy-drama television series that aired on The WB from October 5, 2005, to March 20, 2006. It revolves around the lives of four close-knit sisters of Italian descent, raised in Brooklyn and living in Manhattan.

The show was created by former Sex and the City writer Liz Tuccillo, and executive produced by Friends co-creator Marta Kauffman. Despite heavy promotion, initial ratings did not warrant the show being picked up for a second season when The WB network was folded into The CW.

== Cast and characters ==
The Sorelli sisters. From left to right: Marjee, Ginnie, Rose, Ann

=== Main ===
- Jennifer Esposito as Ginnie, the oldest of the Sorelli sisters. She is an ambitious 30-year-old corporate attorney and the only sister who is married. In the premiere episode, Ginnie learned that she was pregnant, but she ended up losing the baby.
- Kiele Sanchez as Ann, the second sister. She is a 26-year-old therapist who specializes in counseling transgender people.
- Lizzy Caplan as Marjee, who is 23 years old. At the beginning of the series, she was working as a party planner and dating her boss' boyfriend Jason. Later she quit her job and started a business with Jason.
- Laura Breckenridge as Rose, the youngest sister. She is a 19-year-old college student attending NYU. Originally she was a pre-med major, but she later changed her major to drama, despite her father's wishes.
- Callum Blue as Bob Spencer, Ginnie's British husband, who works as a software engineer in the music industry. He recently worked on Jack Johnson's tour.

=== Recurring ===
- Tom Irwin as Joe Sorelli, the father of the Sorelli sisters, a widower who owns and lives above a deli named Sorelli's Deli in Brooklyn.
- Christine Ebersole as Renée, Joe Sorelli's new wife.
- Dan Futterman as Danny, Ann's ex-boyfriend, who owns a restaurant called Sabroso. Ann had been going with Danny for six years when he moved out of their apartment and dumped her; she suspected him of having an affair. They later reunited, only for him to leave her again after learning that she had an abortion shortly after they first got together and kept this from him for six years.
- Victor Webster as Marco, who grew up with Ann and works at Sorelli's Deli where he makes sausages. Ann slept with him after breaking up with Danny.
- Andrew Keegan as Zach, a college student who lives in the same dorm as Rose at NYU. Ann slept with him after breaking up with Danny.
- Anne Elizabeth Ramsay as Trish Houghton, who was Marjee's boss and was dating Jason Greenstein until he began dating Marjee. Trish is obsessed with her dog and hates both Marjee and Jason for what they did to her.
- Julian Ovenden as Jason Greenstein, who worked for Trish and dated her while also seeing Marjee. He later left Trish and started a business with Marjee.
- Kyle Howard as Joel, a student at NYU and has been Rose's best friend for a long time. He is also in love with her. He dates a woman named Chloe, but Chloe dumps him because she knows that he and Rose have feelings for each other.
- Chris Carmack as Alex Brody, Rose's new boyfriend. He is her classmate in Experimental Theater and directed a play in which he and Rose starred. Alex dumped Rose at Joe's wedding so he could go to Hollywood to become an actor.

=== Other characters ===
- Judith Ivey as Bob's mother, who has a knack for hurting Ginnie's feelings although much of it could be unintentional. Bob's parents live in England. They visit Bob and Ginnie for Christmas 2005.
- Roger Rees as Robert Spencer, Bob's father, who apparently likes to drink.
- Jamie Ray Newman as Kylie Stewart, a singer who is Bob's ex-girlfriend and for whom Bob produces an album.
- Shanola Hampton as Flash (real name: Tiffani Lusinski), Rose's punky roommate. She and Rose are not good friends.
- Megan Linder as Megan, the hostess at Danny's restaurant.
- Peter Paige as Patrick, the son Renee gave up for adoption 19 years ago and has not seen since. He owns a bed-and-breakfast on Cape Cod.
- Dana Delany as Francesca Sorelli, Joe Sorelli's wife and the mother of the Sorelli sisters. She died of cancer 15 years earlier.

=== Guest ===
- Jillian Barberie as herself
- The Veronicas (Jess and Lisa Origliasso) as themselves
- Joanna Canton as Chloe, Joel's girlfriend
- Nick D'Agosto as PJ, Marjee's friend
- Zachary Knighton as Gary, Joel's roommate
- Paolo Seganti as Nino Rosati, Marjee's piano teacher
- Frederick Weller as Ginnie's colleague who handles the sale of Sorelli's Deli for the buyer
- Dennis Boutsikaris as Professor Kasnov
- John Prosky as Dr. Gorenberg
- Jackie Geary as Justine, Ann's friend
- Armelia McQueen as the lady at the NYU housing office
- Jonathan Silverman as Brad, Ann's horrible wedding date
- Francesca Catalano as Ginnie at age 17
- Courtney Hope as a young Ann
- Alyssa Shafer as a young Rose
- Laura San Giacomo as Ann Sorelli
- Jon Hamm as Danny
- Kyle Howard as Joel, Rose's friend

== Episodes ==
No.	Title	Directed by	Written by	Original release date	Prod. code
1	"Moving Out, Moving In, Moving On"	James Frawley	Liz Tuccillo	October 5, 2005	2T7051
A lot is happening in the lives of the Sorelli sisters. Rose is moving into a new dorm room after switching from pre-med to experimental theater. Marjee is moving out of her apartment and back home with their father after being evicted. Ann is apparently being dumped by her boyfriend of six years, Danny, who is too busy opening a new restaurant to talk to her about it. Ginnie, who has just learned that she is pregnant, is contemplating how her life will change and trying to break the news to her husband Bob. The sisters learn that their widower father Joe has become engaged to his girlfriend Renée. Despite not being very fond of Renée, the sisters throw an engagement party for her and Joe. Rose shows up having just pierced her tongue and dyed her hair bright blue. Each sister's secret is then revealed, an upsetting time that results in bonding.
2	"Hang in There, Baby"	Arvin Brown	Alex Taub	October 12, 2005	2T7052
Ginnie and Bob try to do all the things they will not be able to do after the baby arrives. On a visit to the Empire State Building, Ginnie learns that Bob is deathly afraid of heights. Meanwhile, Ann is in denial about the fact that she and Danny are breaking up. Marjee has moved back in with her father and is annoyed that his fiancée Renée gets up way too early in the morning and is way too cheerful. Rose, now majoring in experimental theater, worries that her father will stop financing her education.
3	"Cry Me a Sister"	Joanna Kerns	Bill Prady	October 19, 2005	2T7053
Ann is depressed and suffering over her breakup with Danny. Ginnie goes to Danny's restaurant to talk to him, but only makes matters worse. Ann is furious at Ginnie for butting in. Meanwhile, Marjee struggles with her new job and Rose's punky roommate Flash makes fun of her in front of their acting class. Rose unsuccessfully tries to change rooms, so she and Joel dig up dirt on Flash to put her in her place.
4	"Hello, Deli"	Patrick Norris	Maggie Friedman	October 26, 2005	2T7054
As the four sisters watch their father's deli over the weekend while he goes on a vacation with Renée, Ann tries to get over Danny, Ginnie and Marjee fight over responsibility and Rose questions her decision to change majors.
5	"The Naked Truth"	Elodie Keene	Jamie Gorenberg	October 31, 2005	2T7055
Rose lands the lead role in Alex's play, but when she realizes that she must appear in a nude scene with him, she decides not to invite her father and Renée to see it.
6	"Sex and the Sisters"	Joanna Kerns	Jennifer Maisel	November 7, 2005	2T7056
Ginnie and Bob are trying hard not to have sex, on the advice of Ginnie's doctor. Rose is considering having sex, which Marjee encourages her to do. Ginnie and Ann later give Rose different advice. After a horrible date with someone close to her own age, Ann decides to have sex with Zach, who is Rose's age.
7	"Francesca"	Lee Rose	Brian Buckner	November 14, 2005	2T7057
While preparing Thanksgiving dinner, the sisters reminisce about their mother Francesca, who died of cancer. Renée tries to help with the dinner, but the girls are annoyed by nearly everything she does.
8	"Driving Miss Crazy"	Lee Rose	Ian B. Goldberg	November 21, 2005	2T7058
Marjee tries to teach Ginnie how to drive. Joe asks Ann to talk to emotionally-troubled Renée. Rose's longtime best friend Joel is jealous of the attention she gives to her new boyfriend Alex.
9	"Have Yourself a Sorelli Little Christmas"	Jerry Levine	Alicia Sky Varinaitis	December 12, 2005	2T7059
Bob has waited until the last minute to tell Ginnie that his parents will be visiting for Christmas. Ginnie is hurt by the icy treatment she receives from Bob's mother. Ann is in an awkward situation, knowing the big secret that Renée is keeping from Joe. Marjee continues her relationship with her boss' boyfriend Jason. Rose is unsure whether a present she receives is from Alex or Joel.
10	"The Godmother"	Michael Lange	Daniel J. Rubin	January 23, 2006	2T7060
Ginnie and Bob argue over whether Ann should be the guardian of their child in the event they both die. Ann has misgivings about her relationship with Zach. Marjee is tired of having a secret relationship with Jason. Joel tells Rose he will no longer be the best friend. (This episode was originally called "Trust".)
11	"London Calling"	Kevin Dowling	Alex Taub	January 30, 2006	2T7061
Ginnie goes to the recording studio where Bob works and runs into his ex-girlfriend Kylie, who later pays a surprise visit to Ginnie's office. Ann arranges for Marco to talk to Danny about a business deal. Marco tells Ann that he wants a serious relationship. Marjee and Jason concoct a plan to leave Trish, but Jason does not go through with it. Rose plans to sleep with Alex, but is still thinking about Joel.
12	"Daddy's Little Girl"	Lee Rose	Doty Abrams	February 6, 2006	2T7062
Ginnie gets Bob to admit that he is attracted to Kylie. Kylie moves out of the loft and back into a hotel. Ann meets Marco a couple of times at Sorelli's Deli and considers getting serious with him. Marjee quits her job, breaks up with Jason, and moves in with Ann, whom she says is her favorite sister. Joe Sorelli is cool when he finds Alex in Rose's dorm room, but not cool when his little girl brings Alex home to dinner.
13	"Not Without My Daughter"	Martha Coolidge	Maggie Friedman	February 13, 2006	2T7063
Joe and Renée are getting married. After Ginnie's doctor tells her she must go on complete bed rest, Bob tries to find a way to keep her from missing the wedding. When Ann learns that Danny is not planning to go, she convinces him that he should. Danny arrives at the wedding alone, having just had an argument with Megan. Ann is with Marco, but pays more attention to Danny. Marjee gets annoyed at Renée's son Patrick when he announces a gift that is similar to the gift that the Sorelli sisters are planning to give. Rose is with Alex, but Alex seems more interested in his acting career than in being with her.
14	"Here's a Balloon for You"	Lee Rose	Brian Buckner	February 27, 2006	2T7064
Ann and Danny reconcile. Both Marjee and Rose are single. When problems with Ginnie's pregnancy worsen, Bob takes her to the hospital where she eventually loses the baby. Nobody knows how to contact Joe, who is on his honeymoon, so Marjee breaks into Trish's office in an effort to find out. Trish catches her and throws her out, but Jason surprises Marjee when he turns up at the hospital with the information she was looking for. Rose is surprised when Joel appears at the hospital and surprised again later when she learns that Joel has a girlfriend. Danny is stunned when Ann tells him a secret she kept from him for the six years they were together.
15	"Sisters Are Forever"	Michael Lange	Jamie Gorenberg	March 6, 2006	2T7065
Ginnie is avoiding Bob, who is worried they will turn out like his parents, who ignore each other. Danny is having a hard time accepting that Ann never told him that she had an abortion. Jason convinces Marjee to go into business with him but Trish has blackballed them with all the suppliers. Marjee kidnaps Trish's dog and uses it to blackmail Trish. Rose and Joel spend time together, but when Joel's girlfriend Chloe finds out, she puts a stop to it.
16	"His Name Is Ruth"	Lee Rose	Katherine Lingenfelter	March 13, 2006	2T7066
Ginnie brings home a lost dog and treats it better than she treats Bob. Ann, who has a lot of time on her hands since she and Danny split up again, tries to help Bob pick out a birthday gift for Ginnie, but Bob does not want help. Marjee starts to think that Jason might be "the one" but gets suspicious when he receives calls from another woman. After Marjee kisses her old friend PJ, she starts to wonder if her relationship with Jason is doomed because neither she nor Jason is trustworthy. Rose befriends Joel's girlfriend Chloe and ends up at a restaurant with her, Joel, and his roommate. When Joel and Rose decide to split their orders, Chloe freaks out and Rose realizes that she has feelings for Joel.
17	"The Cape"	Sarah Pia Anderson	Eric Goldberg & Peter Tibbals	March 20, 2006	2T7067
Ginnie and Bob, who are still having problems, go to Cape Cod at Joe's invitation for a weekend at the Tide Inn, which is half-owned by Renée's son Patrick. Jason gets evicted from his apartment by Trish, from whom he sub-let it, so Marjee and Jason move in with Ann, who dislikes the arrangement. Marjee learns that none of her sisters like Jason. Rose, who has finally realized that she is in love with Joel, learns that Chloe is throwing a birthday party for him. Chloe reluctantly invites Rose who reluctantly goes, and once there she proceeds to get drunk and kiss Joel. Meanwhile, Joe has told Ginnie that he wants to sell the deli and move to Cape Cod permanently, so Ginnie starts a phone chain. Ann, Rose, and Marjee (and Jason) drive up to Cape Cod intent on talking Joe out of moving but the four sisters have a change of heart and give their blessing to the move.
18	"The Move"	Lee Rose	Marta Kauffman	March 20, 2006	2T7068
As the four Sorelli sisters help Joe pack for his move to the Cape, they find a curious love note from Marjee's former piano teacher, Nino Rosati, to their mother Francesca. Ginnie and Bob's relationship continues to be difficult. Bob tells Ginnie that he is considering taking a job as a sound engineer on Jack Johnson's tour, the opening act being none other than Bob's former girlfriend, Kylie Stewart. Ginnie, who is handling details of the sale of the deli, finds herself attracted to a male colleague who is handling things for the buyer. Ann is stuck with the job of taking care of Joe, who hurt his back picking up a bag of birdseed. Marjee has misgivings about Jason's suggestion that they get an apartment together. When Rose goes to Joel's dorm room to apologize for getting drunk and kissing him, she learns that Chloe has broken up with him and Joel blames Rose. The sisters find another note from Nino to Francesca – and a key to Nino's hotel room. While wondering if their mother had an affair, the sisters conclude that it is important for people to go after what they really want. Rose goes to Joel's dorm room to make love to him. Ann goes to talk to Danny. Marjee tells Jason that things will not work out because she wants more than what they have. Ginnie, who has gone to her colleague's apartment and kissed him, realizes that an affair is not what she wants and rushes home to Bob – only to find that he has left on the tour.
