= Susan Edith Saxe =

American bank robber

FBI Ten Most Wanted Fugitive

Description
- Born: January 18, 1949 (age 77); Hartford, Connecticut, U.S.

Status
- Added: October 17, 1970
- Caught: March 27, 1975
- Number: 316
- Captured

Susan Edith Saxe (born January 18, 1949) is an American activist who is one of only thirteen women ever to make the FBI Ten Most Wanted Fugitives list, and one of three women from Brandeis University to do so. She was placed on the list on October 17, 1970, and remained on it until March 27, 1975.

Saxe describes herself as a "lifelong radical activist, intersectional in outlook since back in the day when we just expressed it as the idea that 'everything is connected.'"

== Background ==
A then-recent graduate from Brandeis University, Saxe was one of several left-wing young radicals who were placed on the FBI's Most Wanted list in the early 1970s. Along with Katherine Ann Power, Stanley Ray Bond, and ex-convicts William Gilday and Robert Valeri, she escaped from a bank robbery in Brighton, Boston, in which Gilday shot and killed Boston Police Department officer Walter Schroeder. She and her four accomplices broke into a National Guard Armory in Newburyport, Massachusetts, on September 20, 1970, and stole a pickup truck, blasting caps, and 400 rounds of .30-caliber ammunition.

Saxe was on the run until 1975 when she was arrested in Philadelphia, after a police officer recognized her from a photo distributed by the FBI the same day. Her trial was one of the early cases for attorney Nancy Gertner. She pled guilty to two charges of robbery and one charge of manslaughter. She served seven years in prison.

== Personal life ==
Saxe is a lesbian. She is the sister-in-law of screenwriter Josh Olson, and has appeared on his podcast series The West Wing Thing.
