= TOFOP =

- Genre: Comedy
- Language: English

Cast and voices
- Hosted by: Charlie Clausen; Wil Anderson

Production
- Length: 1 hour

Technical specifications
- Audio format: MP3

Publication
- Original release: 2 July 2010
- Updates: Weekly (usually Sunday)

Related
- Website: http://www.tofop.com

TOFOP (an acronym of Thirty Odd Foot Of Pod[cast]) is a weekly Australian comedy podcast created and hosted by Wil Anderson and Charlie Clausen, and launched in July 2010. Episodes are roughly an hour in length, and primarily consists of casual conversations between Anderson and Clausen on a variety of recurring themes, including; film, popular culture, and sport. Common features are humorous personal anecdotes, and detailed discussions on bizarre hypothetical situations. Significant media coverage in June 2012 helped TOFOP rise to become the most popular comedy podcast in Australia. The show's name is a reference to 30 Odd Foot of Grunts, a band led by Australian actor Russell Crowe.

The podcast has over 50,000 followers in 70 countries mostly in Australia and the USA. Anderson and Clausen have made occasional appearances on episodes of TOFOP's "sister podcast," American comedy podcast Walking the Room. This relationship contributed greatly to the podcast's American popularity.

During Episode 83 of TOFOP, released on 9 September 2012, the projected long-term hiatus of the podcast was announced. Clausen and Anderson were deliberately vague in detailing the reasons for TOFOP's hiatus, other than the fact that a particular company employing Clausen had objected to the content of the podcast. In January 2013 the hiatus was revealed to have been requested by the Seven Network after Clausen had received a starring role as Zac MacGuire in popular Australian soap opera Home and Away. The show returned in February 2013 under the name FOFOP, a reference to a previous episode and the television show Fringe. However, due to contractual obligations the show returned without Clausen, and instead with Anderson and one or more guests, nicknamed "guest-Charlies".

On 1 June 2014 Clausen returned to TOFOP in Episode 84, after almost 2 years. Each episode of the podcast averages 20,000 downloads.

In 2017, TOFOP joined the podcasting network, Planet Broadcasting.

== Guest appearances ==
Despite the fact that TOFOP was usually recorded with only Anderson and Clausen present, several episodes also featured guests, including Australian comedians Michael Chamberlin, Justin Hamilton and Tom Ballard. Walking the Room hosts Greg Behrendt and Dave Anthony appeared on several episodes of the podcast, and also collaborated with Anderson and Clausen during the 2012 Melbourne International Comedy Festival, in a live podcast recording dubbed "Super Pod".

Since Episode 52, the podcast introduction featured prominent Australian voice-over artist John Deeks performing a parody of advisory content warnings commonly heard on Australian television.

== List of TOFOP episodes ==
Episode	Title	Release date
1	Super-piss	2 July 2010
2	Donuts & Clutch	17 July 2010
3	Richard Greico Underpants	21 July 2010
4	No Harm, No Foul	25 July 2010
5	Wil "Fish In A Barrel" Anderson	1 August 2010
6	Dirty Puppet Fucker	8 August 2010
7	Avengers Assemble!	15 August 2010
8	Underage Friendly	22 August 2010
9	Shit Happened	30 August 2010
10	A Couple of Kookaburras	5 September 2010
11	Pramsport	12 September 2010
12	Kathy Bates To The Future	19 September 2010
13	The Human Internet	28 September 2010
14	Jesusland	3 October 2010
15	Behind The Music. Men.	10 October 2010
16	The Only Gay At The Orgy	17 October 2010
17	Advance Aussie Fair	24 October 2010
18	Innocent Till Proven Spooky	30 October 2010
19	May The Faustino Be With You	7 November 2010
20	I Object	14 November 2010
21	The Vortex	21 November 2010
22	C.R.E.A.M.	28 November 2010
23	A Bridge With Benefits	8 December 2010
24	Pimp My Bog	12 December 2010
25	Entertainment's Hitler	9 February 2011
26	Conspiradiddy	13 February 2011
27	Anna Phil Lactate	20 February 2011
28	Cock Weed	27 February 2011
29	Chonks	6 March 2011
30	Humpa Lumpas	13 March 2011
31	Only Wil Bleeds	20 March 2011
32	Roboctupus	27 March 2011
33	The Anti-Crust	3 April 2011
34	The Pornocalypse	10 April 2011
35	Truth Bombs	17 April 2011
36	Pinguins	24 April 2011
37	We've Achieved Nothing	1 May 2011
38	Shoot, Kid	8 May 2011
39	Bukkaké	15 May 2011
40	Poo Poo	22 May 2011
41	Andimov's Three Laws	29 May 2011
42	Twins	5 June 2011
43	Lay Away	12 June 2011
44	Goat Or Throat	20 June 2011
45	Prime Minister Van Damme	26 June 2011
46	Love vs. The Stockmarket	24 July 2011
47	Matthew, Mark, Luke & Schlong	7 August 2011
48	The Zooey Keeper	14 August 2011
49	Kid Carbon Tax	21 August 2011
50	Rise of the Planet of the Muppets	28 August 2011
51	Hopefully	6 September 2011
52	Bertie Blagowrie	19 September 2011
53	Kim Jong Wil	25 September 2011
54	Ponyism	9 October 2011
55	The Answering	16 October 2011
56	Mrs. T's	20 November 2011
57	Uncle Zom	27 November 2011
58	The Oktober 2000	4 December 2011
59	Aweson	11 December 2011
60	Uppity Monkey	19 December 2011
61	Leprecum	25 December 2011
62	Cloon Clucks Clan	21 January 2012
63	A Mission To India	28 January 2012
64	TOFOB	1 February 2012
65	The Over-Explaining Cyrano	5 February 2012
66	The Prison Clause	12 February 2012
67	Li'l Elvis	19 February 2012
68	Playgoy	26 February 2012
69	Chobelix	4 March 2012
70	Ghost: Ghostbusters	11 March 2012
71	Buckets	18 March 2012
72	Billionaire Baby	25 March 2012
73	Manifisto	1 April 2012
74	Benedict Cumabunch	8 April 2012
Bonus Episode	The Death Of Superpod	9 April 2012
75	TOFOW	15 April 2012
76	The Quiz	22 April 2012
77	The Quiz II	29 April 2012
78	The Answering Reloaded	3 May 2012
79	The Answering Revolutions	13 May 2012
80	Catourage	20 May 2012
81	The Really Expendables	8 July 2012
82	No No No	15 July 2012
83	Weng Weng	9 September 2012
Bonus Episode	01 06 14 84	1 June 2014
84	We’re Back, We’re Bad, You're Black, I'm Mad	1 June 2014
85	Vin Diesel's Hannibal	8 June 2014
86	Namaste Bitch	17 June 2014
87	Nonlids	23 June 2014
88	KFCXC	29 June 2014
89	Gopher Day	6 July 2014
90	Awesun's Creek	17 July 2014
91	How You Doohan?	22 July 2014
92	Hot Woman and The Enmore	27 July 2014
93	20.32 Centimetres	30 September 2014
94	Undiplomatic Immunity	6 October 2014
95	Pengweng Weng Weng	19 October 2014
96	Crunchy Granola Sweet	28 October 2014
97	Cool Things For Cool People	30 October 2014
98	We’ve Bee-n Here For Years	25 November 2014
99	What Actually	3 December 2014
Bonus Episode	Cypress Halloumi Remix	17 December 2014
Bonus Episode	Popeapolooza	24 December 2014
100	HOHOHOFOP	21 January 2015
Bonus Episode	Superpod 2: This Time It's Recorded	8 April 2015
101	Never Had A Bartman	9 May 2015
102	A Podcast From Death Row	10 August 2015
103	Mad Adam Boory Road	15 August 2015
104	Biodegradable Gelatinous Mounds	23 August 2015
105	Clear Eyes, Credit Card Details, Can't Lose	2 September 2015
106	Extra Butter	6 September 2015
107	Limp To The G	11 September 2015
108	It's Miller Time	16 September 2015
109	Leftovers	28 September 2015
110	Die Hard 6	19 October 2015
111	Solo Han	27 October 2015
112	Heyfield Girls	15 December 2015
113	Everyone RelaXmas	25 December 2015
114	Everyone ReLAx	13 January 2016
115	Sussan	18 January 2016
116	Classic Funeral Suit	14 January 2016
117	UFO Russ Go	7 February 2016
118	Aaron Norris Jokes	21 February 2016
119	President Dick With Eyes	13 March 2016
120	Foottight	20 March 2016
121	Good Luck With That	27 March 2016
122	Donnie Darko 2: Even Darkor	4 April 2016
123	Rise Of A Machine	17 April 2016
124	Murderer Vs Murderer	24 April 2016
125	Gareth Fuq	1 May 2016
126	Quantum Cop	16 May 2016
127	Auld Lang Batsign	29 May 2016
