= Stanley Ray Bond =

American murderer

- Born: October 30, 1944
- Died: May 24, 1972 (aged 27); Walpole, Massachusetts
- Status: Deceased
- Criminal charges: Murder, armed robbery

Stanley Ray Bond (October 30, 1944 – May 24, 1972) was a former convict who enrolled at Brandeis University in Waltham, Massachusetts. He was arrested for a bank robbery conducted to obtain funds for anti-Vietnam War efforts. Previously, he was a Private First Class in the United States Army and served in Vietnam during the Vietnam War. During the bank robbery, a Boston Police Department officer was shot and killed, with Bond and several accomplices captured following the robbery. Bond later died in prison awaiting trial when a bomb he built to use for an escape detonated prematurely.

== Brandeis ==
In February 1970, Bond enrolled at Brandeis University as part of a government sponsored program for ex-convicts out on parole. There he became involved with the left-wing National Student Strike Force. This organization advocated strikes across the country by students as a protest to the Vietnam War. It also supported the Black Panthers. While involved with the anti-war movement Bond met Susan Saxe and Katherine Ann Power, becoming involved with Power romantically.

== Robbery and death ==
These three, along with ex-convicts William Gilday and Robert Valeri, made plans to rob a bank in order to finance the activities of the Black Panthers. First the group burglarized and torched a Massachusetts National Guard armory on September 20, 1970, stealing ammunition. Then, on September 23, in order to finance their anti-war activities, the five robbed a Brighton, Massachusetts bank of $26,000. During the holdup, Gilday shot police officer Walter A. Schroeder in the back and killed him. Following the robbery, Bond declared the heist a success and said the stolen money will be donated to various left-wing groups. He subtracted $2,500 from the loot, which he declared would be their "payment" for pulling off the robbery, dividing it into $500 of spending money for each participant.

Bond, Gilday, and Valeri were all captured soon after the robbery. Saxe remained at large until 1975 and Power until 1993. On May 24, 1972, Bond died at Walpole State Prison in an escape attempt making an improvised explosive device, which backfired and killed him. His remains were interred at Los Angeles National Cemetery in California on July 2, 1972.
