= Liz Tuccillo =

American writer and producer

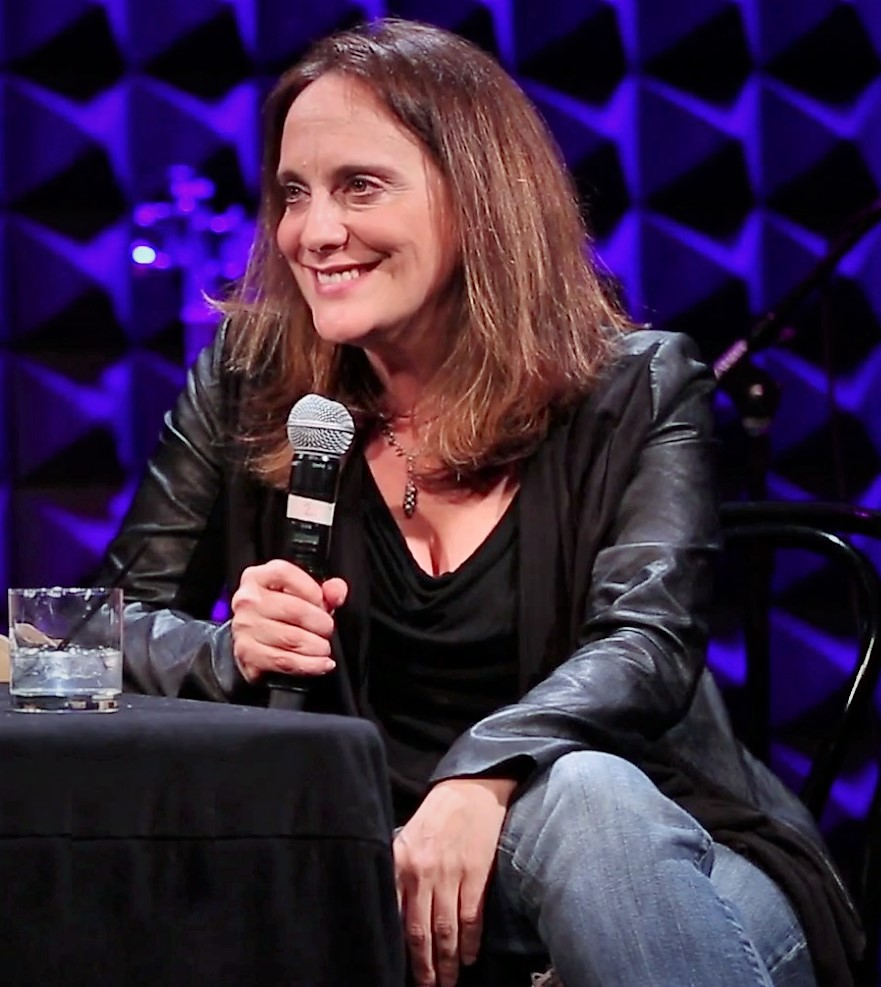
- Tuccillo on Employee of the Month in 2015
- Occupations: Writer, producer
- Writing career
- Genres: Self-improvement, Comedy
- Notable work: He's Just Not That Into You

Liz Tuccillo is an American writer and producer best known for her work on the HBO comedy series Sex and the City and for co-authoring (with Greg Behrendt) the self-help book He's Just Not That Into You, for which they won a Quill Award. Her first novel, How to Be Single, was published in June 2008 and adapted into a feature film in 2016.

Tuccillo created the 2005 television series Related, which aired on the WB network. She directed and wrote the 2008 film Gone to the Dogs and the film Take Care which premiered at South by Southwest in March 2014.

== Filmography ==
Key
†	Denotes works that have not yet been released

=== Film ===
Year	Film	Role	Notes
1989	I Love N.Y.	Actress (Italian Girl)	
1996	Ed's Next Move	Actress (Numbers Woman)	
2008	Claire	Writer, Director, Producer	short
2008	Gone to the Dogs	Writer, Director, Producer	short
2008	27 Dresses	Script supervisor	
2009	Four Single Fathers	Writer, Producer	
2009	He's Just Not That Into You	Based on her book	
2010	Meet My Boyfriend!!!	Writer	short
2014	Take Care	Writer, Director, Producer	
2016	How To Be Single	Based on her book	

=== Television ===
Year	Film	Role	Notes
1990	ABC Afterschool Special	Actress (unknown role)	Episode: "Stood Up!"
2002-2004	Sex and the City	Staff writer (Season 5); story editor, writer, executive story editor (Season 6)	Wrote episode: "The Post-It Always Sticks Twice"
2005-2006	Related	Creator, co-executive producer	Wrote episode: "Moving Out, Moving In, Moving On"
2008	Puppy Love	Writer	web series
2011	Love Bites	Consulting producer	
2011	Paul the Male Matchmaker	Writer, executive producer	
2013	Smash	Writer	Wrote episode: "The Read-Through"
2018	Sweetbitter	Writer, co-executive producer	Wrote episode: "Simone's"
2018-2019	Divorce	Showrunner, writer, executive producer	Wrote episodes: "Worth It," "Charred," "Bad Manners," "Knock Knock"
2022	Alaska Daily	Writer, co-executive producer	Wrote episode: "The Weekend"
2024	American Sports Story	Writer, co-executive producer	Wrote episode: "The Man"
2026	Best Medicine	Developer, writer, executive producer	Wrote episodes: "Docked," "Bean There Done That"

== Theatre ==
In 2000, Tuccillo's play Joe Fearless, a play for sports fanatics (and the people who tolerate them) premiered off-Broadway at Atlantic Theater Company. Among its cast were Julie Dretzin, Michael Ealy, Dan Fogler, Michael Potts, Blake Robbins, Randy Ryan, and Callie Thorne. It was directed by Craig Carlisle.

In 2002, Tuccillo's musical Cheyenne: A Transwestern premiered at the Hudson Theatre in Los Angeles. Tuccillo wrote the book and lyrics and Phillip Rogers wrote the music. It was directed by Craig Carlisle.
