= Lee Camp (comedian) =

American comedian, writer, and activist (born 1980)

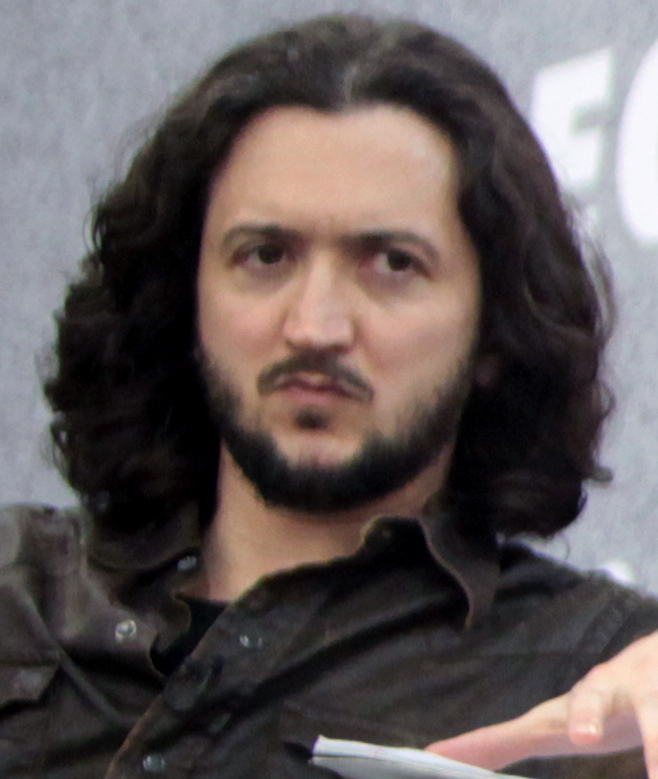
- 2016 Politicon at the Pasadena Convention Center in Pasadena, California
- Born: c. 1980; Washington, D.C.
- Education: University of Virginia
- Occupations: Comedian; writer; journalist; political commentator
- Website: leecamp.net

Lee Camp (born c. 1980) is an American comedian, writer, podcaster, news journalist and news commentator. As a television host, he presented the show Redacted Tonight for several years on the Russian state-funded network RT America until it was shut down after Russia's invasion of Ukraine in February 2022. In July 2022, he started a new show, Most Censored News with Lee Camp, with MintPress News. On YouTube, Lee Camp has a news show called Dangerous Ideas with Lee Camp.

== Early life ==
Camp was born at the Walter Reed Army Medical Center in Washington, D.C. His father was a military doctor.

Camp is of Jewish heritage and has two brothers. His family lived in Bethesda, Maryland, then moved to Richmond, Virginia, when he was 8 years of age. He attended the University of Virginia, where he wrote for The Cavalier Daily. He majored in English and psychology and graduated in 2002.

He began performing stand-up comedy on his 19th birthday at an open-mic night at Matt's Pub in Richmond.

== Career ==
After graduating from the University of Virginia, Camp moved to New York City, where he performed regularly at the Ha! Comedy Club. He went on to perform regularly at colleges and it was during this time that he started to include political material in his stand up act, which lead to performances at political events such as Netroots Nation conventions and Rock the Vote events. In the 2000s, he also opened for such comedians as Jimmy Fallon, Darrell Hammond, Kevin Nealon, Tracy Morgan, Lewis Black and Dick Gregory.

In 2002, Camp published his first book Neither Sophisticated Nor Intelligent, a collection of his best humor columns from The Cavalier Daily. With Nick Alexander and Alan Lord, Camp co-authored the 2005 BIGfib Book of Bollocks, a collection of stories from the satirical website BIGfib.com. Camp has been a contributor to The Onion and The Huffington Post.

In 2017, Camp and his partner Eleanor Goldfield created the Common Censored podcast, which focuses on grassroots activism issues.

Camp was the host and head writer of the weekly comedy news show Redacted Tonight with Lee Camp, which aired on RT America for eight years. He told Rachel Manteuffel of The Washington Post Magazine that the Russian government funds the network that ran his show. When asked about advertising, he said, "one of the reasons I'm at RT America is because there's no advertising. If there were advertising, no channel really wants someone who goes after corporations as much as I do."

After RT America shut down in the wake of the Feb. 2022 Russian invasion of Ukraine, Camp blamed the "U.S. government war machine" for the end of the network. According to the Daily Beast, he also claimed that he had lost his job due to the Great Reset conspiracy theory, as well as promoting the Ukraine bioweapons conspiracy theory on Twitter.

== Discography ==
=== DVD ===
- Sometimes Funny Hurts (2007)
- Lee Camp Live At Comix (2009)
- We Are Nothing (2014)

=== CD ===
- Chaos for the Weary (Stand Up! Records, 2011)
- Pepper Spray the Tears Away (Stand Up! Records, 2012)

== Filmography ==
Year	Title	Role	Notes
2005	Dealbreaker	Waiter	
2005	Law & Order: Special Victims Unit	Bart	Episode: "Intoxicated"
2006	Exposing the Order of the Serpentine	Ashamed man	

== Bibliography ==
- Neither Sophisticated Nor Intelligent: A College Humorist's Take on Life, Xlibris, 2002. ISBN 978-1-40104-266-0
- The BIGfib Book of Bollocks: The BIGfib.com Annual, the Best Of 2005, BIGfib Books, 2005. ISBN 978-2-95248-993-5
- Bullet Points and Punch Lines: The Most Important Commentary Ever Written on the Epic American Tragicomedy, PM Press, 2020. ISBN 978-1-62963-785-3
