= Marycrest Girls High School =

Coordinates: 39°47′35.8″N 105°01′26.5″W

Marycrest High School
- Denver, Colorado; United States

Information
- Type: Private, all female
- Established: 1958
- Closed: 1988
- Grades: 9–12
- Enrollment: 200 (peak in the 1970s)
- Affiliation: Roman Catholic Church

Marycrest Girls High School was an all female high school located at 5320 Federal Boulevard in Denver, Colorado, United States. The school was a private Roman Catholic institution.

== History ==
In 1938, the Sisters of St. Francis of Penance and Christian Charity purchased property near 52nd Avenue and Federal Boulevard in the northwest of Denver. They used the property, which they christened Marycrest, to house a convent and motherhouse for their order's new midwestern province. The sisters converted their novitiate into Marycrest High School in 1958. The school's enrolment peaked around 200 in the 1970s, when it was known as a female counterpart to nearby Regis Jesuit High School.

The school closed in 1988. Following the school's closure, its campus was leased to Tennyson Center for Children with an option for that organization to purchase the property. In 1996, the building was demolished and replaced with assisted living residences.

== Notable alumni ==
- Katherine Ann Power; 1967; bank robber.
