= Katherine Ann Power =

American ex-convict and fugitive (born 1949)

Katherine Ann Power (Alice Louise Metzinger)
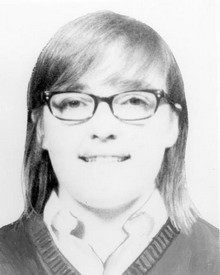
- FBI fugitive photo

FBI Ten Most Wanted Fugitive
- Charges: Armed robbery; Manslaughter
- Alias: Alice Louise Metzinger

Description
- Born: January 25, 1949 (age 77); Denver, Colorado, U.S.
- Spouse: Ron Duncan (deceased)
- Children: 1

Status
- Penalty: 8–12 years imprisonment; 14 years probation
- Added: October 17, 1970
- Removed: June 15, 1984
- Number: 315
- Removed from Top Ten Fugitive List

Katherine Ann Power (born January 25, 1949), also known under the aliases Mae Kelly and Alice Louise Metzinger, is an American ex-convict and long-time fugitive, who, along with her fellow student and accomplice Susan Edith Saxe, was placed on the FBI's Most Wanted Fugitives list in 1970. The two participated in robberies at a Massachusetts National Guard armory and a bank in Brighton, Massachusetts, where Boston police officer Walter Schroeder was shot and killed. Power remained at large for twenty-three years.

A native of Colorado, Power turned herself over to authorities in 1993 after starting a new life in Oregon. She pleaded guilty and was imprisoned in Massachusetts for six years before being released on fourteen years' probation. While in prison, Power completed her bachelor's degree, and after her release, earned a master's degree at Oregon State University. She currently resides in the Boston area.

== Early life ==
Power grew up as the third of seven children in Denver, Colorado. Her parents, Winfield and Marjorie, raised their Irish Catholic middle-class family on Winfield's salary as a bank credit manager and Marjorie's income as a registered nurse. Katherine became a Girl Scout and won a scholarship to Marycrest Girls High School, a Catholic school in Colorado. While in high school, she won a Betty Crocker cooking award, wrote a regular column for the Denver Post, graduated as valedictorian and received a full scholarship to Brandeis University, a liberal arts school in Waltham, Massachusetts.

In 1967, Power enrolled at Brandeis as a sociology major and honor student at a time when the campus was being roiled by student protests opposing the Vietnam War. She became known for wandering campus braless and barefoot in an orange-colored smock, for her attendance at Students for a Democratic Society protest rallies, and for her involvement in the Brandeis Strike Information Center. Power and her roommate, Susan Edith Saxe, worked to organize student protests for a committee known as the National Student Strike Force. The two also became acquainted with fellow organizer Stanley Ray Bond, an ex-convict and soldier attending classes at Brandeis through a special program.

== Protest and murder ==
Through their association with Bond, Power and Saxe became involved in a plot to arm the Black Panther Party as a response to U.S. involvement in the Vietnam War. Bond introduced the pair to former convicts William Gilday and Robert Valeri and together the group plotted to rob the State Street Bank & Trust. On September 20, 1970, the group robbed a National Guard armory in Newburyport, Massachusetts, and took 400 rounds of ammunition. They also stole weapons and set fire to the facility, causing about $125,000 in damage.

Three days later, on September 23, 1970, the group robbed a bank in the Brighton neighborhood of Boston, carrying handguns, a shotgun and a submachine gun. The first policeman on the scene, Officer Walter Schroeder of the Boston Police Department, was shot in the back by Gilday when he attempted to stop the robbery. He subsequently died from his wounds. The group escaped with $26,000 in cash that they planned to use to finance an overthrow of the federal government. Power was behind the wheel of one of the two getaway vehicles.

While raiding her apartment after the bank robbery, police found evidence tying Power to both robberies. This included weapons, ammunition and a telephone switchboard from the armory. Power's attorneys would subsequently blame her involvement in the robberies as the result of manipulation by her partner Bond.

== Fugitive ==
Gilday, Valeri and Bond were captured shortly after the Brighton robbery. Bond died in custody while making a bomb as part of an escape attempt, while Valeri turned state's evidence and testified against Gilday. Valeri received a jail term of twenty-five years for the robbery. Gilday was initially sentenced to death, later commuted to life without parole. He died in prison after 41 years of incarceration. Power and Saxe eluded capture.

In November 1970, Power and Saxe became the sixteenth and seventeenth persons on the FBI's Most Wanted Fugitives list. At first, Power and Saxe traveled together, escaping arrest by hiding out in women's communes. For part of this time, the two went to Connecticut and Power assumed the name "Mae Kelly". Saxe was able to elude arrest until 1975, when she was captured in Philadelphia, Pennsylvania. She then served five years in prison.

Prior to her surrender in 1993, Power had last been seen in Kentucky in 1974. In 1977, she assumed the alias "Alice Louise Metzinger", taking the name from the birth certificate of an infant that had died the year before her birth. In 1979, she moved west to Oregon and gave birth to a son, Jaime, by an unknown father.

As time went by, authorities received few tips regarding Power's location and she was eventually removed from the Most Wanted Fugitives list in 1984. The following year, she settled in the city of Lebanon in Oregon's Willamette Valley with her son Jaime and boyfriend Ron Duncan, a local meat cutter and bookkeeper. While living in Oregon, Power taught cooking classes at Linn-Benton Community College in Albany and worked at restaurants in Corvallis and Eugene. She reached the shortlist for the post of food writer for the Corvallis Gazette-Times and became part-owner of Napoli Restaurant and Bakery in Eugene.

Power had suffered from clinical depression since childhood and confided her fugitive status to her therapist Linda Carroll. She developed the desire to stop living her life under her assumed name and, through therapy that included participation in the mock trial of a soldier charged with killing civilians during the Vietnam War, she began to prepare for her surrender to the authorities. This included her decision to marry Duncan in 1992 and reveal her background to her friends.

== Surrender ==
In 1993, Katherine Ann Power negotiated a surrender with authorities and ended twenty-three years of hiding. Negotiations were carried out through her attorneys Steven Black, a public defender, and Rikki Klieman, a prominent Boston lawyer. On September 15, 1993, she pleaded guilty to two counts of armed robbery and manslaughter in Boston. At the time, her son Jaime was aged 14 and a freshman in high school, while Power was aged 44. Her husband, Ron Duncan, then adopted Jaime.

In court, Power made the following statement about officer Schroeder:

His death was shocking to me, and I have had to examine my conscience and accept any responsibility I have for the event that led to it.

Power was sentenced to eight to twelve years in prison for the bank robbery, and five years and a $10,000 fine for the incident at the National Guard armory. The five-year sentence was to be served concurrently with the eight- to twelve-year sentence, with a possibility of parole after five years. Additionally, Judge Robert Banks of Suffolk County Superior Court imposed a probation condition that Power could not profit from her crime. This probation condition also precluded her ability to profit directly or indirectly from telling her story. Power later appealed this portion of the sentence on First Amendment grounds, but the Massachusetts Supreme Judicial Court rejected the argument and the U.S. Supreme Court denied certiorari. Banks remarked that the sentence prosecutors negotiated with Power was inadequate.

In a 1993 public statement, Power said:

The illegal acts I committed arose not from any desire for personal gain but from a deep philosophical and spiritual commitment that if a wrong exists, one must take active steps to stop it, regardless of the consequences to oneself in comfort or security.

== Prison and release ==
While in prison, Power completed her college degree in liberal studies through Boston University. In March 1998, she was eligible for parole after receiving time off for good behavior but withdrew her request after opposition from Schroeder's family. On October 2, 1999, she was released from prison and placed on fourteen years of probation after serving six years of her eight- to twelve-year sentence. Aged 50 at the time of release, Power then returned to Oregon and the family she formed while a fugitive. Shortly after release, she appeared at a public forum on peace at Willamette University in Salem, Oregon, where she questioned the "violent posture" of some people in the peace movement, including activist Philip Berrigan.

Later, Power enrolled in graduate studies at Oregon State University in Corvallis, where she worked on a master's degree in interdisciplinary studies with focuses on writing, philosophy, and ethics. She also taught freshman composition for the English department. On May 10, 2001, she read a poem she wrote called "Falling from Darkness" in Corvallis and graduated with her MAIS later that year. In September 2001, Power represented the Oregon State philosophy department in a biotech lecture series.

As of 2008, Power worked for Cambridge Cares About AIDS in the Boston area. As of 2013 she lived in Boston and had two grandsons.

== Cultural references ==
Since her surrender, Power and her story have been the basis for a variety of books and even a television episode of Law & Order. The episode, entitled "White Rabbit", was loosely based on her case, in which the character based on her, named Susan Forrest, is found after money from her crime spree turns up in a private safety deposit box after a robbery. William Kunstler appears in the episode playing himself as Forrest's lawyer. The fifth-season episode aired on October 19, 1994. Later her story was the basis for Dana Spiotta's novel Eat the Document (2006). She also plays a part in David Racine's novel Floating in a Most Peculiar Way (1999).

In 2026, Deborah Salem Smith and Charlie Thurston co-wrote The Getaway Driver, a play inspired by Power's story, that debuted at Trinity Rep in Providence, RI. The play tells Power's story along with reactions from Claire Schroeder, daughter of murdered Officer Walter Schroeder.
