= He's Just Not That into You =

2004 book by Greg Behrendt and Liz Tuccillo

- Author: Greg Behrendt, Liz Tuccillo
- Cover artist: Lauren Monchik
- Language: English
- Genre: Self-improvement
- Publisher: Simon Spotlight Entertainment
- Publication date: 2004
- Publication place: United States
- Media type: Print (hardcover & paperback)
- Pages: 304
- ISBN: 1-4169-0953-2

He's Just Not That into You is a self-improvement book written by Greg Behrendt and Liz Tuccillo that was published in 2004 and later adapted into a film by the same name in 2009. It was a New York Times bestseller and was featured on The Oprah Winfrey Show.

== Background ==
The book is about dating and romantic relationships that was inspired by an episode of Sex and the City, "Pick-A-Little, Talk-A-Little", in which the character Miranda Hobbes asks Carrie Bradshaw's boyfriend, Jack Berger, to analyze the post-date behavior of a potential love interest. Because the man declined Miranda's invitation to come up to her apartment after the date, stating that he has an early meeting, Berger concludes, "He's just not that into you", adding, "When a guy's really into you, he's coming upstairs, meeting or no meeting." The book authors, Greg Behrendt and Liz Tuccillo, were writers on the show.

== Synopsis ==
The book is a "self-help" dating guide aimed at single women. The premise of the book, as stated in the title, tells women readers that if a man in whom you are interested is not making the effort to pursue you, he is simply "just not that into you."

== Film ==
A film based on the book was released by New Line Cinema on February 6, 2009. Ken Kwapis directed the film, which featured an all-star cast including Ben Affleck, Jennifer Aniston, Drew Barrymore, Kevin Connolly, Jennifer Connelly, Bradley Cooper, Ginnifer Goodwin, Scarlett Johansson, and Justin Long. Despite receiving mixed reviews from critics, it was a box office success, grossing over $180 million worldwide.

== In popular culture ==
The book appears in Gilmore Girls episode "Pulp Friction", when Lorelai Gilmore prepares the Dragon Fly Inn's library for her interview and states that all of the good books are gone, leaving her with five copies of He's Just Not That into You, which she hands an employee to dispose of. The book was also referenced in the movie Zombieland, in season two of Californication and the series Vexed. VH1 discussed the book in their "I Love 2004" episode of their I Love the New Millennium special. The book is also mentioned by the main character of the novel Perfect on Paper by Sophie Gonzales.
