= Meagan Day =

American writer and journalist

- Born: San Antonio, Texas, United States
- Education: Oberlin College (BA); Goldsmiths, University of London (MA)
- Occupations: Writer; journalist
- Employer: Jacobin
- Organization: Democratic Socialists of America
- Website: www.meaganday.com

Meagan Day is an American writer and journalist from Texas. Day is an editor at Jacobin, where she was previously a staff writer. She is the author of the book Maximum Sunlight (2016), and co-author of the book Bigger than Bernie (2020).

== Life and career ==
Day was born in Austin, Texas, and raised in San Antonio. She received her bachelor's degree at Oberlin College, graduating in 2012. After working for The Believer, and as a personal assistant to writer Dave Eggers at McSweeney's, she went on to earn her master's degree from Goldsmiths, University of London in 2013.

In 2016, Day released her non-fiction book Maximum Sunlight, concerning the town of Tonopah, Nevada. The book features photographs from various locations in Tonopah taken by Hannah Klein.

After working briefly at Mother Jones, Day was hired at Jacobin in 2017 as a full-time staff writer. In 2020, along with co-author Micah Uetricht, Day published the book Bigger than Bernie: How We Can Win Democratic Socialism in Our Time.

Day has described herself as a socialist, and is an active member of the Democratic Socialists of America.

== Works ==
- — (2016). Maximum Sunlight. Photographs by Hannah Klein. Oakland, CA: E.M. Wolfman. ISBN 978-0-9983-4610-6. OCLC 978251367.
- —; Uetricht, Micah (2020). Bigger than Bernie: How We Can Win Democratic Socialism in Our Time. London: Verso Books. ISBN 978-1-7887-3838-5. OCLC 1256050456.
