= Bronzeville (podcast) =

Historical fiction podcast

- Genre: Historical drama; Crime
- Language: English

Creative team
- Written by: Josh Olson
- Directed by: KC Wayland; Larenz Tate; Laurence Fishburne

Publication
- Original release: February 7, 2017

Bronzeville is a historical fiction podcast written by Josh Olson. Set in the eponymous district of Chicago in the 1940s, it mainly follows the members of two families, the Randolphs and the Copelands.

The series star Larenz Tate and Laurence Fishburne, who also act as executive producers; all episodes were directed by either Tate, Fishburne, or producer KC Wayland. The first season of Bronzeville was released between February 7 and April 11, 2017, with a second season released between March 16 and April 20, 2021.

== Background ==
The podcast was produced by Cinema Gypsy Productions, TateMen Entertainment, and Audio HQ. The show is directed by Larenz Tate, Laurence Fishburne, and Kc Wayland. Larenz Tate spoke with Quincy Jones in 2004 when preparing for his role in the movie Ray, which inspired him to dig into Chicago's history and eventually led to the creation of Bronzeville. The first season of the podcast debuted on February 7, 2017, and season two debuted on March 16, 2021. The fist season consisted of 10 episodes. The second season consisted of six episodes. The podcast is a historical fiction story set in 1940s Chicago. The story is based on Black Metropolis. The story is set during a time when radio dramas were popular and the first black radio soap opera, Here Comes Tomorrow, was created in Chicago. The podcast begins by describing 47th and South Park in Bronzeville, Chicago. The show follows the Randolph family and the Copeland family. The show focuses on the underground lottery or the numbers game. According to the Chicago Defender, the podcast has received more than 20 million listens. The podcast has over 50 voice actors and more than 100 characters.

=== Cast and characters ===
- Larenz Tate as Jimmy Tillman
- Laurence Fishburne as Curtis "Eyeball" Randolph
- Tracee Ellis Ross as Anna Randolph
- Omari Hardwick as Jesse Copeland
- Wood Harris as Everett Copeland
- Tika Sumpter as Lisa Copeland
- Lahmard Tate as Zeke Copeland
- Cory Hardrict as Casper Dixon
- Mekhi Phifer
- LeVar Burton
- Lalah Hathaway
- Affion Crockett
- Beth Maitland
- Michael Nouri
- Obba Babatundé
- Rodney Saulsberry
- Lance Reddick
- Fay Hauser
- Kevin Brief
