= Greg Behrendt =

American comedian and author (born 1963)

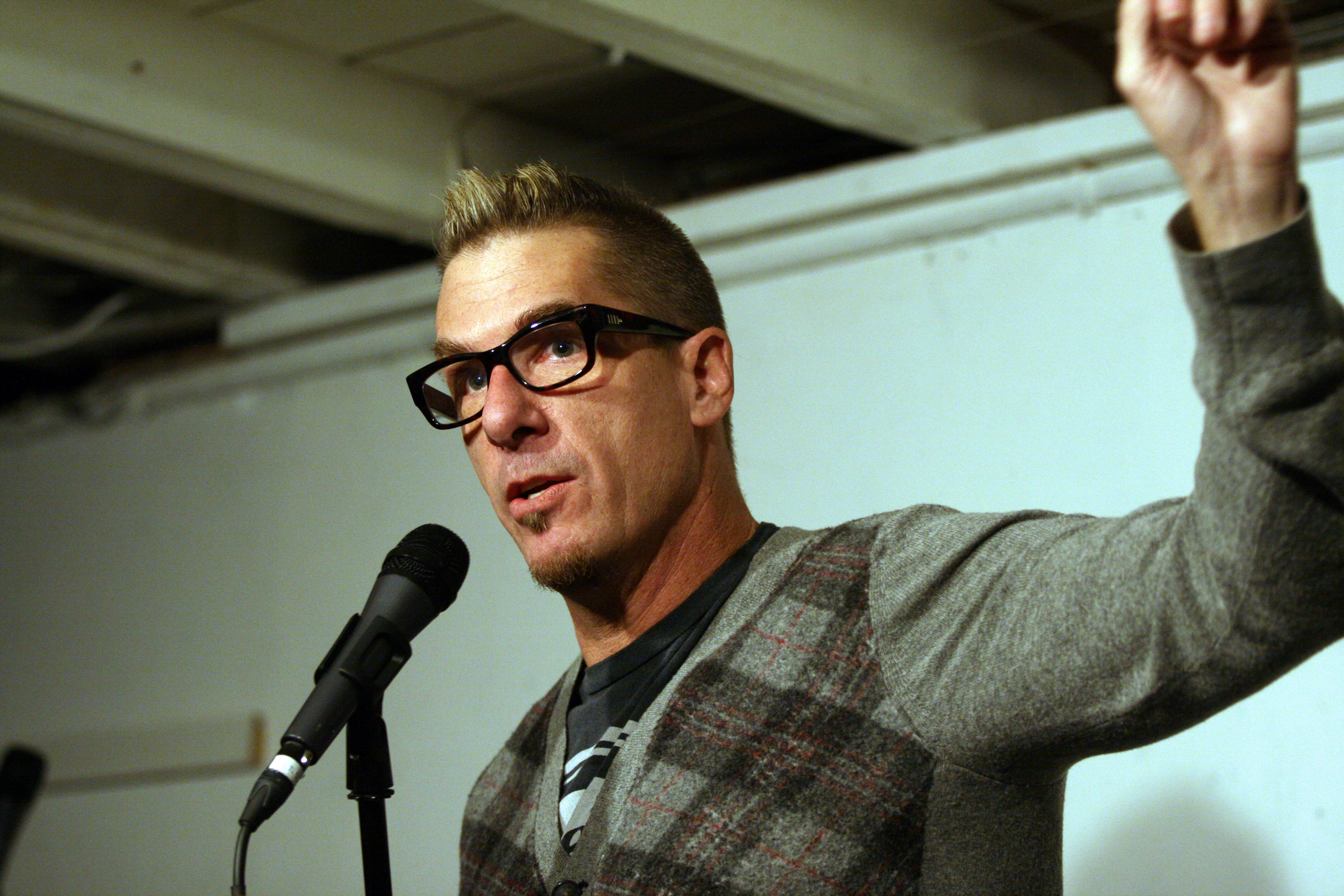
- Greg Behrendt appearing for The Meltdown in 2011
- Born: Gregory Paul Behrendt; July 21, 1963 (age 63); San Francisco, California, U.S.
- Education: University of Oregon
- Occupations: Comedian, host, writer, author, musician
- Spouse: Amiira Ruotola
- Children: 2
- Writing career
- Genres: Comedy, Podcasts, Rock, Self-improvement, Dating
- Notable works: Walking the Room; The Reigning Monarchs; He's Just Not That Into You; The Greg Behrendt Show

Gregory Behrendt (born July 21, 1963) is an American comedian, talk show host, author, and musician. His work as a script consultant for the HBO sitcom Sex and the City led to co-authoring of the New York Times bestseller He's Just Not That Into You (2004), later adapted into a film by the same name. He also hosted two talk shows, The Greg Behrendt Show (2006) and Greg Behrendt's Wake Up Call (2009).

== Early life and education ==
Greg Behrendt graduated with a Bachelor of Arts degree in theater from the University of Oregon in 1991, though initially he had enrolled to be a business major and to play rugby.

== Career ==
After graduation, Behrendt moved to San Francisco, where he joined an improvisational troupe, and met fellow comic Margaret Cho. In his early years, he performed comedy and improv in San Francisco. He was a member of the improv troupe Crash and Burn, whose members included Margaret Cho. He came up as a performer alongside such comics as David Cross (with whom he roomed for years) and Patton Oswalt.

He went on to appear on The Tonight Show and Late Night with Conan O'Brien. His stand-up special, Greg Behrendt is Uncool, debuted on Comedy Central in January 2006.

In June 2006, he appeared on Celebrity Poker Showdown, playing for a domestic violence charity. Behrendt was a script consultant for the HBO sitcom Sex and the City, "offering script notes from the perspective of a straight man to the writing team, composed of women and gay men".

With Liz Tuccillo, Behrendt co-wrote the 2004 self-help book He's Just Not That Into You. It was adapted by Drew Barrymore's Flower Films/Warner Bros. as a movie of the same name, premiering February 6, 2009.

With his wife Amiira Ruotola-Behrendt, he co-wrote It's Called a Breakup Because It's Broken and "It's just a f***** date".

He released the book It's Just a Date! in the UK.

His daily daytime "self-help" talk show, The Greg Behrendt Show, premiered September 12, 2006, four months later Sony Pictures Television announced, in January 2007 that the series would not have a second season, and the show aired its last new episodes in February 2007.

He also did a mid-season program for the 2006–07 television season Greg Behrendt's Wake-Up Call for ABC, which never aired on the network. The program began airing in January 2009 on ABC's sister cable network SoapNet. He also appeared on the Great Debate at the 2010 Melbourne Comedy Festival, in which he argued as the third speaker for the negative team on the debate "Food Is Better Than Sex". Behrendt's team, made up of New Zealand comedian Cal Wilson, English comedian Russell Kane and Behrendt himself, won the comedy event.

He started the podcast Walking the Room with his friend Dave Anthony.

As of 2026, Greg is working on cruise ships, going around the world telling his jokes. He has been working with Royal Caribbean since 2023.

== Personal life ==
He is married to Amiira Ruotola, a writer and marketing expert. They have two daughters, Mighty Luna and Bella True. He is a recovering alcoholic. He plays guitar in his own surf/rockabilly instrumental band, The Reigning Monarchs.

In June 2015, Behrendt announced via his Facebook Fan Page that he was battling cancer, and had undertaken three rounds of chemotherapy. He discussed his diagnosis on episode 16TF of Jimmy Pardo's podcast "Never Not Funny", as well as Wil Anderson's podcast "Wilosophy" on July 9, 2015. He stated that he had a form of lymphoma.

In February 2015, Behrendt published the ebook "See You on the Way Down - Catch You on the Way Back Up!" (Everand Originals) about his battles with cancer and addiction. It has been described (on KTLA5 podcast) as a candid tell-all revelation.

== Literary works ==
- Pocket Guide to He's Just Not That into You: The No-excuses Truth to Understanding Guys, with Liz Tuccillo. Peter Pauper Press, Inc., 2005. ISBN 1593599900.
- Greg Behrendt; Amiira Ruotola-Behrendt (September 5, 2006). It's Called a Breakup Because It's Broken: The Smart Girl's Break-Up Buddy. Broadway. ISBN 978-0-7679-2196-1.
- Greg Behrendt; Amiira Ruotola-Behrendt (July 1, 2008). It's Just a Date: How to Get 'em, How to Read 'em, and How to Rock 'em. HarperElement. ISBN 9780007228324.
- Greg Behrendt; Liz Tuccillo (January 6, 2009). He's Just Not That into You: The No-Excuses Truth to Understanding Guys. Gallery Books. ISBN 978-1-4169-0977-4.
- Greg Behrendt (February 15, 2024). See You on the Way Down: Catch You on the Way Back Up!. Everand. ISBN 9781094460802.

== Comedy albums ==
- Greg Behrendt Is Uncool (2006)
- That Guy From That Thing (2009)
- Why Are You In Here? (2018)
