= Josh Olson =

American screenwriter

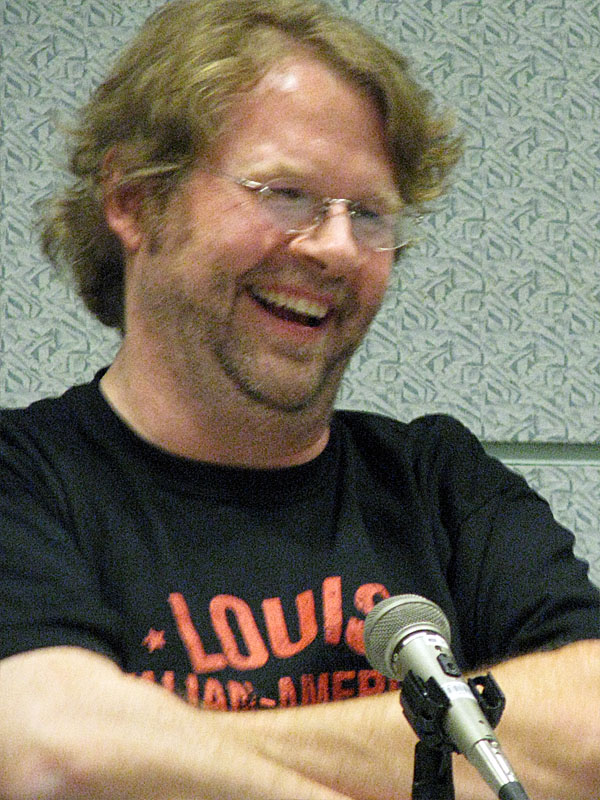
- Olson at the 2008 Screenwriting Expo
- Born: Philadelphia, Pennsylvania, U.S.
- Occupations: Podcast writer, Screenwriter

Joshua R. Olson is an American screenwriter and podcaster, known for writing the 2005 film A History of Violence.

== Career ==
Olson wrote and directed the low budget horror film Infested in 2002. He wrote the screenplay for the 2005 film A History of Violence.. He was nominated for the British Academy Award, the Writer's Guild Award and the Academy Award. In 2006, Olson collaborated with Harlan Ellison on an adaptation of the author's short story "The Discarded" for ABC's series Masters of Science Fiction. He worked on Peter Jackson's film based on the Halo video game series, but the project was later cancelled.

Olson wrote the first draft of the movie Jack Reacher, for Paramount Pictures. Ultimately, the movie was written and directed by Christopher McQuarrie.

Olson wrote two seasons of the audio drama, Bronzeville, which is produced by and stars Laurence Fishburne and Larenz Tate. He is one of the hosts of the film interview podcast, "The Movies That Made Me", along with director Joe Dante.

Olson co-hosts with Dave Anthony The West Wing Thing, a podcast rewatching and discussing episodes of The West Wing and its impact on politics. In 2020, Olson started Rainy Day Podcasts with Mick Jagger, Steve Bing, and Victoria Pearman. The company has a "first look deal" with Warner Brothers, and will produce original narrative podcasts.

== Filmography ==
Year	Title	Notes
1998	On the Border	Screenplay; television film
1999	Hitman's Run	Screenplay (uncredited)
2001	Instinct to Kill	Screenplay; television film
2002	Infested	Also director
2005	A History of Violence	Screenplay
2007	The Discarded	Episode of Masters of Science Fiction
2008	Batman: Gotham Knight	Anthology film segment: Have I Got a Story for You
2024	Trigger Warning	Screenplay
