= He's Just Not That into You (film) =

2009 film by Ken Kwapis

- Theatrical release poster
- Directed by: Ken Kwapis
- Screenplay by: Abby Kohn; Marc Silverstein
- Based on: He's Just Not That into You by Greg Behrendt and Liz Tuccillo
- Produced by: Nancy Juvonen
- Starring: Ben Affleck; Jennifer Aniston; Drew Barrymore; Jennifer Connelly; Kevin Connolly; Bradley Cooper; Ginnifer Goodwin; Scarlett Johansson; Kris Kristofferson; Justin Long
- Cinematography: John Bailey
- Edited by: Cara Silverman
- Music by: Cliff Eidelman
- Production companies: New Line Cinema; Flower Films
- Distributed by: Warner Bros. Pictures
- Release dates: January 24, 2009 (L'Alpe d'Huez Film Festival); February 6, 2009 (United States)
- Running time: 129 minutes
- Countries: United States; Germany
- Language: English
- Budget: $40 million
- Box office: $181 million

He's Just Not That into You (stylized as he's just not that into you) is a 2009 romantic comedy-drama film directed by Ken Kwapis, based on Greg Behrendt and Liz Tuccillo's 2004 self-help book. It follows nine people and their varying romantic problems. Gigi, a common thread amongst the characters, is followed more closely than the other eight and has a more developed storyline as she consistently misreads all of her romantic partners' behaviors. She meets Alex, who helps her to interpret signs given to her by her dates.

The film stars an ensemble cast of Ben Affleck, Jennifer Aniston, Drew Barrymore, Jennifer Connelly, Kevin Connolly, Bradley Cooper, Ginnifer Goodwin, Scarlett Johansson, and Justin Long. The film was produced by New Line Cinema and Flower Films, the production company owned by Barrymore, who is also the film's executive producer.

Production began in Baltimore in 2007. The film was released on February 6, 2009, by Warner Bros. Pictures to mixed reviews. It grossed $27.7 million on its opening weekend and over $178.8 million worldwide.

== Plot ==
=== Gigi, Conor and Alex ===
Following a tepid date with real estate agent Conor Barry, Gigi is befriended by bar owner Alex, who suggests she misinterprets romantic signals. As their friendship continues, she interprets his helpfulness as a sign he is attracted to her. Alex rebuffs Gigi, chastising her for ignoring his advice.

As Gigi moves on from Alex, he realizes he is in love with her. After leaving several unanswered messages, he arrives at Gigi's apartment after her return from a date, declares his love and they end up kissing.

=== Janine, Ben, and Anna ===
Gigi's co-worker, Janine Gunders, obsesses over her home renovations while her husband, Ben, becomes attracted to yoga instructor and aspiring singer Anna Marks. They pursue a flirtatious friendship supposedly while he helps her establish a singing career. Ben reveals he only married Janine after she delivered an ultimatum, either marry or break up. He agrees to only be friends with Anna, but she continues pressing until they sleep together.

Finding cigarette butts hidden in the backyard, Janine accuses Ben of smoking again, citing her father's death from lung cancer for her anger. He blames the workmen at their house. During a tense home improvement shopping trip, Ben confesses his infidelity. Devastated, Janine blames herself and wants to save their marriage; Ben seems less enthusiastic.

Later, Anna and Ben begin having sex in his office, and he strips her to her lingerie. They are interrupted by Janine, who arrives hoping to spice up their marriage. Forced to hide in a closet and listen as Ben and Janine have sex, Anna afterward leaves in disgust, ending their affair.

As Janine tidies up Ben's clothes at home, she discovers a pack of cigarettes and explodes in anger. When he returns, she is gone, leaving his clothes folded on the staircase with a carton of cigarettes and a note asking for a divorce. Janine moves into an apartment to restart her life, and Anna is seen performing at an upscale nightclub. Alone, Ben buys beer at the same supermarket where he met Anna.

=== Conor, Anna, and Mary ===
Anna enjoys a close friendship with Alex's friend, Conor. Though she wants a casual relationship, he misinterprets her playful affection as something more.

Anna's friend, Mary Harris, works in advertising sales for a local gay newspaper and helps Conor promote his real estate business. Like Gigi, she meets many men, mostly online, but despite constantly monitoring her emails, pager, phone, and MySpace messages, her dates go nowhere.

While Conor attempts to cultivate a gay clientele, they explain how he is going wrong with Anna. Taking their advice, he declares his love to her. Feeling vulnerable after what happened with Ben, Anna agrees to a more serious relationship. When Conor later proposes buying a house and moving in together, she admits she is uninterested, so they return to being just friends.

Mary later runs into Conor, recognizing him from his ad photo, having only spoken to him over the phone. They hit it off, and start dating.

=== Beth and Neil ===
Gigi's co-worker Beth Murphy lives with her boyfriend Neil, a friend of Ben's. After seven years together, Beth wants to get married, but Neil opposes marriage. Gigi announces she will no longer misinterpret vague gestures and comments, and says that men who delay marrying likely never will. Beth confronts Neil, who insists he will never marry, so she ends it.

Preparations for Beth's younger sister's wedding reopen the issue after Beth hears multiple backhanded comments from family members. During the reception, her father Ken suffers a heart attack. Beth cares for him as he recuperates at home while her sisters wallow and their husbands binge watch television, constantly ordering takeout while not helping at all.

Beth's patience wanes as the household grows more dysfunctional and the chores pile up. However, just when she is about to snap, she is shocked to find Neil, who learned of her father's heart attack and rushed over, finishing the dishes in a now clean kitchen, doing the laundry, and restocking the fridge. They reconcile, with Beth assuring Neil she wants him back without being married. Neil later proposes, and they wed aboard his sailboat.

== Cast ==
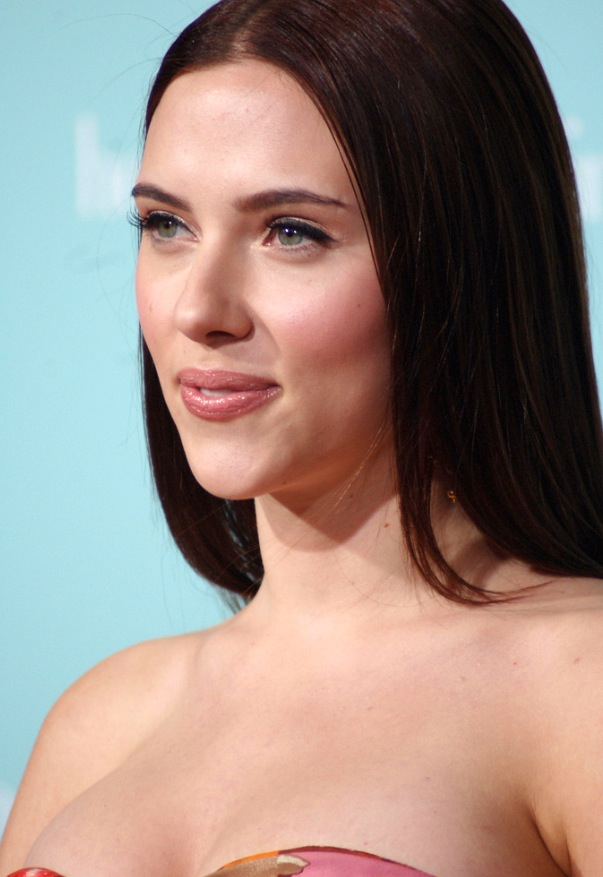
Scarlett Johansson at the premiere of He's Just Not That into You

- Ben Affleck as Neil
- Jennifer Aniston as Beth Murphy
- Drew Barrymore as Mary Harris
- Jennifer Connelly as Janine Gunders
- Kevin Connolly as Conor Barry
- Bradley Cooper as Ben Gunders
- Ginnifer Goodwin as Gigi Phillips
- Scarlett Johansson as Anna Marks
- Justin Long as Alex
- Kris Kristofferson as Ken Murphy
- Wilson Cruz as Nathan
- Hedy Burress as Laura
- Sasha Alexander as Catharine
- Leonardo Nam as Joshua
- Busy Philipps as Kelli Ann

== Production ==
Baltimore, Maryland was selected for the setting of He's Just Not That into You as an alternative to the common New York City, Chicago, or Los Angeles settings of romantic comedies. In addition, screenwriter Marc Silverstein had lived in the city for several years prior to attending college. Exterior shots were filmed in the city for two weeks during November 2007. Interior scenes were filmed in Los Angeles.

The film was released on February 6, 2009, by Warner Bros. Pictures.

== Release ==
In its opening weekend, the film earned $27.8 million, topping the box office. Its total US gross amounted to $93,953,653 while internationally it grossed $87.1 million, bringing the worldwide gross to $181 million against a $40 million budget.

== Reception ==
On Rotten Tomatoes, the film has an approval rating of 42% from critics based on 167 reviews, with an average rating of 5.2/10. The website's critics consensus reads, "Despite the best efforts of a talented ensemble cast, He's Just Not That into You devotes too little time to each of its protagonists, thus reducing them to stereotypes." On Metacritic, the film has a weighted average score of 47 out of 100 based on 32 reviews, indicating "mixed or average" reviews. Audiences surveyed by CinemaScore gave the film a grade B+ on a scale of A to F.

John Anderson of Variety wrote: "No one has anything to distract them from the minutiae of their love lives, which they proceed to incinerate through overanalysis. It's a moral fable, maybe, if you make half a million a year." Peter Travers of Rolling Stone wrote: "Here's a true S&M date movie. Only sadistic men and masochistic women could love it." Peter Bradshaw of The Guardian called the film "an unendurable relationship-romcom, which you should avoid the way you would a glass of punch with a frothy gob of Anthrax floating on the surface."

While Manohla Dargis of The New York Times recognized a few "nice moments" throughout, she overall denounced it as a "grotesque representation of female desire" which now seems largely "reserved for shoes, wedding bells, and babies". Moira Macdonald of The Seattle Times heavily criticized Kwapis's characters, "these aren't people, they're pages from self-help manuals", making them "hard to care about".

=== Accolades ===
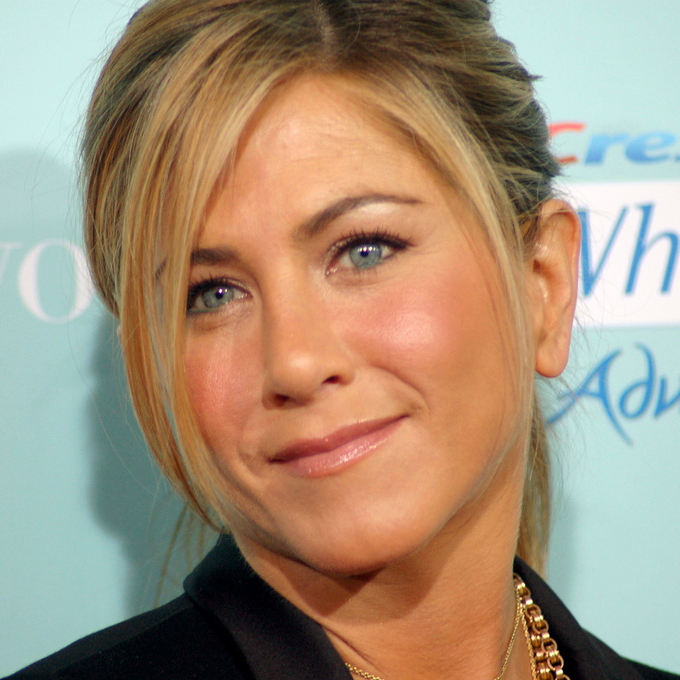
Jennifer Aniston (pictured at the premiere of He's Just Not That into You) was nominated for a Teen Choice Award

Year	Group	Category	Recipient	Result
2009	Teen Choice Awards	Choice Movie: Romance	He's Just Not That into You	Nominated
2009	Teen Choice Awards	Choice Movie: Comedy Actress	Jennifer Aniston	Nominated
2009	BMI Film & TV Awards	BMI Film Music Award	Cliff Eidelman	Won
2010	People's Choice Awards	Favorite Comedy Movie	He's Just Not That into You	Nominated

== Home media ==
The DVD and Blu-ray Disc was released on June 2, 2009. The Blu-ray version of the release includes a digital copy. The film was sold to E! for 4% of the film's domestic box office (~$3.6 million) for television broadcast after the opportunity passed for the USA Network and HBO to pick it up.

== Music ==
The soundtrack album was released on February 3, 2009, by New Line Records.

The score for He's Just Not That into You was composed by Cliff Eidelman, who recorded his score with an 80-piece ensemble of the Hollywood Studio Symphony at the Newman Scoring Stage. New Line Records released a score album on February 17.
