= Charlie Clausen =

Australian actor

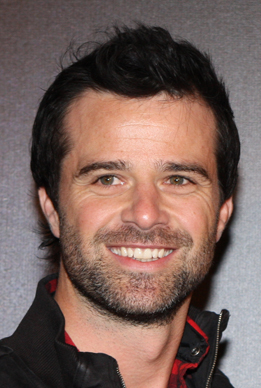
- Born: Charlie Clausen; 31 July 1977 (age 49); Melbourne, Victoria, Australia
- Other name: The Human Internet
- Occupations: Actor, podcaster, presenter
- Spouse: Gemma Lee (m. 2015)
- Children: 1

Charlie Clausen (born 31 July 1977) is an Australian actor, known for his roles as Jake Harrison in McLeod's Daughters, Alex Kirby in the police drama series Blue Heelers, and Zac MacGuire in the soap opera Home and Away. In 2024, Clausen joined the presenting team of travel series Getaway. Clausen has also hosted podcasts TOFOP, That's Aweson, 2 Guys 1 Cup, and DadPod.

== Career ==
=== Acting ===
After completing a Media Arts degree at Deakin University, Clausen went on to secure the role of Aaron Symonds in the ABC series Head Start in 2001. The following year, he began appearing in McLeod's Daughters as Jake Harrison, a love interest for Becky Howard (Jessica Napier). In 2024, Clausen revealed that he still received fan mail from fans overseas. He said "There are very few jobs that people still talk about 20 years later. I was only a very small part of that – I'm sure there are a large portion of McLeod's Daughters fans who are like, 'Who?'"

Clausen played Alex Kirby in the final two seasons of police drama series Blue Heelers from 2005 until 2006. It was his first lead role. In 2008, Clausen and his partner Gemma Lee, a director, co-founded Blackberry Films, which has produced commercials, short films and music videos. That same year, he appeared in Canal Road, followed by the recurring role of Jay Duncan in the soap opera Neighbours. The character was introduced as a love interest for Stephanie Scully (Carla Bonner) and was responsible for causing the death of Marco Silvani (Jesse Rosenfeld) in a Bush fire.

In 2012, Clausen joined the main cast of the Seven Network soap opera Home and Away following a successful audition. He was cast as prison education officer Zac MacGuire. He was contracted for three years and began filming almost immediately. Clausen chose to leave Home and Away after four years and Zac's departure aired in May 2017. Clausen was pleased with his character's exit storyline, which saw Zac leave for a fresh start after a divorce. That same year, Clausen appeared in the second season of Wolf Creek.

In 2024, Clausen joined Channel 9's travel series Getaway. On 28 August 2025, it was announced that Clausen had joined the cast of miniseries Imposter.

=== Podcasts ===
From July 2010 to September 2012, Clausen collaborated on a free weekly podcast, TOFOP (aka 30 Odd Foot of Pod), with comedian Wil Anderson. TOFOP was placed on indefinite hiatus when Clausen began filming on Home and Away as the Seven Network deemed it a conflict of interest. Anderson then started another similar podcast called FOFOP (as in "faux TOFOP"), with various comedians and personalities featured as "Guest Charlies". Anderson and Clausen reunited for a live show as part of the 2014 Melbourne Comedy Festival, co-starring several Guest Charlies. On 1 June 2014, Clausen returned to the podcast.

In February 2015, Clausen launched his own solo podcast That's Aweson, The title referring to an episode of TOFOP in which Clausen tried to convince Anderson that his surname rhymed with "awesome."

In 2015, Clausen and Anderson launched an AFL themed podcast 2 Guys 1 Cup. The name referring to the fact that Clausen's St Kilda Football Club and Anderson's Western Bulldogs had one AFL/VFL premiership each.

In 2019, he began co-hosting DadPod with Osher Gunsberg after they both became fathers around the same time.

== Personal life ==
Clausen married his partner of 12 years Gemma Lee in Los Angeles on 23 September 2015. Their first child, a daughter, was born in September 2019.

Clausen is a known supporter of the St Kilda Football Club in the AFL.

== Filmography ==
Television performances
Year	Title	Role	Notes
2001	Head Start	Aaron Symonds	11 episodes
2002–2003	McLeod's Daughters	Jake Harrison	28 episodes
2005–2006	Blue Heelers	Alex Kirby	Series regular
2008	Canal Road	Tom Squires	13 episodes
2008	Neighbours	Jay Duncan	Recurring
2010	Satisfaction	Paul	Episodes: "Lifesavers" and "Bug Crush"
2012	Tricky Business	Ben Napier	Episode: "Skyrockets in Flight"
2013–2017	Home and Away	Zac MacGuire	Series regular
2017	Wolf Creek	Danny Michaels	3 episodes
2022	Allegedly	Geoff	1 episode (podcast series)
2022	Darby and Joan	Dam	1 episode
2023	Surviving Summers	Dice	2 episodes
2024	Prosper	Paul	2 episodes
2024–present	Getaway	Host	
2025	Imposter	Todd	TV series

Film performances
Year	Title	Role	Notes
2000	On the Beach	Seaman Byers	
2006	Dead and Buried	Clive	Also writer and producer
2006	Love No. 9	Dean	Short film
2007	Pig Latin	Peter	Short film
2009	The Wake	Jamie	Short
2011	Everyman		Short
2011	The Bride	Max	Short
2014	Submerged	Charlie	Short
2022	The Curious Case of Dolphin Bay	David	
