= Jared Yates Sexton =

American author and political commentator

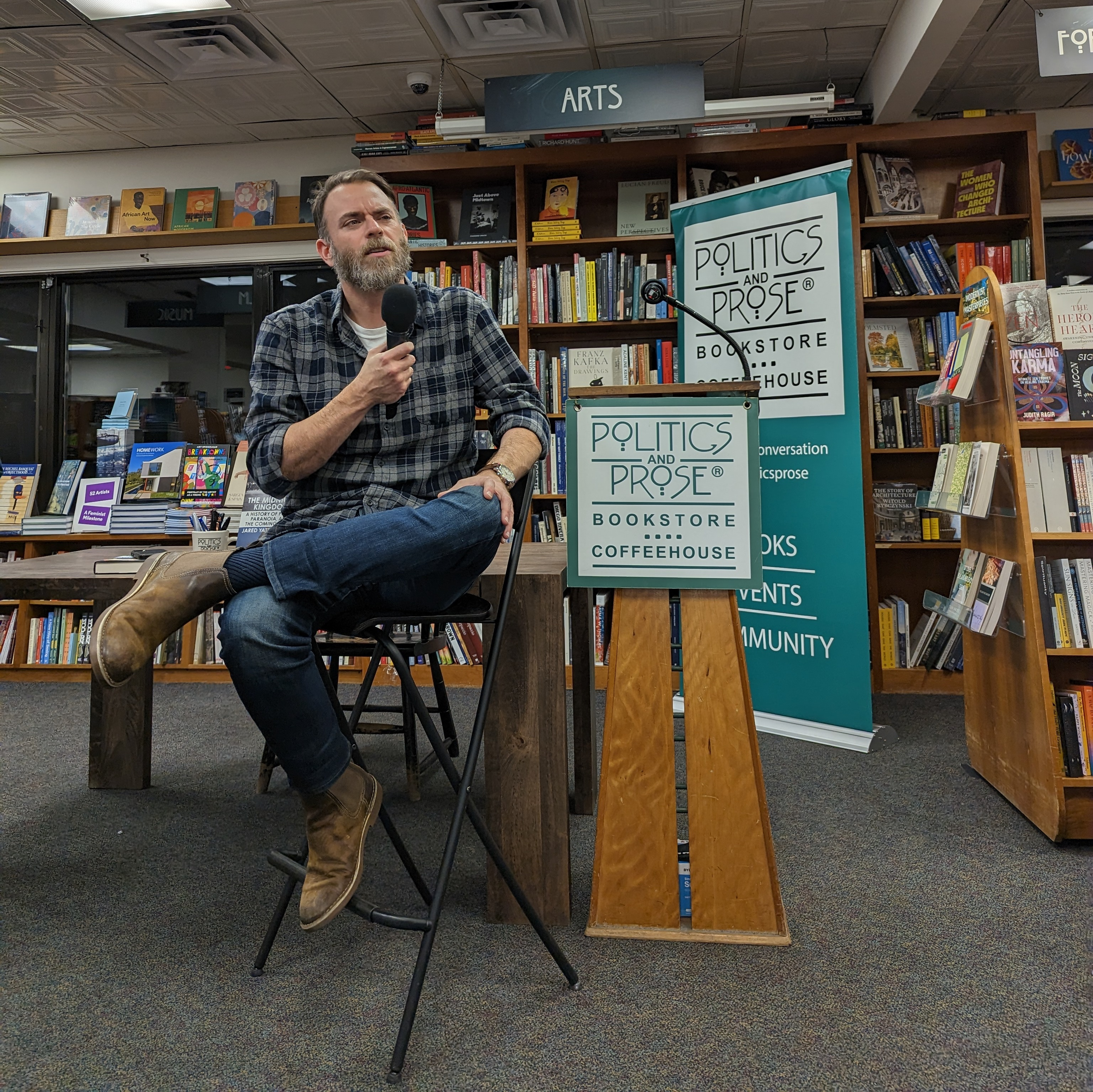
- Sexton gives an author talk at Politics and Prose in 2023
- Born: October 7, 1981 (age 45)
- Education: Indiana State University, Southern Illinois University Carbondale

Jared Yates Sexton (born October 7, 1981) is an American author and political commentator from Linton, Indiana. He was an associate professor in the Department of Writing and Linguistics at Georgia Southern University.

== Early life ==
Sexton grew up in southern Indiana. He studied English and Creative Writing at Indiana State University, and later received his MFA in Creative Writing from Southern Illinois University in 2008.

== Career ==
Sexton previously taught Creative Writing at Ball State before accepting a position at Georgia Southern University, where he was a tenured Associate Professor of Creative Writing, as recently as 2022.

Sexton is the author of three short story collections: An End to All Things (Atticus Books), The Hook and the Haymaker (Split Lip Press), and I Am the Oil of the Engine of the World (Split Lip Press), as well as a crime novel, Bring me the Head of Yorkie Goodman (New Pulp Press), written under the pseudonym Rowdy Yates.

His work has been published in Time Magazine,The New York Times, The New Republic, Salon, Paste, Southern Humanities Review, PANK, and in Hobart.

=== Political journalism ===
In April 2015, Sexton started covering the 2016 U.S. presidential election, attending multiple rallies for both major candidates and writing regular articles for Atticus Review in his column Atticus on the Trail. He covered the Charleston shooting and trail of church burnings in the South. He has written for Time Magazine, The New York Times, Salon and the New Republic.

In the summer of 2016, Sexton went to another Trump rally in South Carolina, and reported on the behavior he observed there. His live tweets of the event soon went viral and garnered him national attention, which included frequent death threats. He later wrote about the experience and became a regular contributor to The New Republic and The New York Times.

In December 2016, Sexton was a guest political commentator on The Last Word with Lawrence O'Donnell on MSNBC, as well as on various radio programs, including KCRW.

Sexton also authors an independent publication on Substack entitled "Dispatches from a Collapsing State".

=== Podcast ===
Sexton is a co-host of The Muckrake Podcast, a semi-weekly political analysis podcast on the CLNS media network.

== Selected works ==
=== Books ===
- An End to All Things: Stories Atticus Books (December 21, 2012) ISBN 978-0692387566
- Bring Me the Head of Yorkie Goodman (as Rowdy Yates) New Pulp Press (February 19, 2015) ISBN 978-0692387566
- The Hook and the Haymaker Split Lip Press (January 5, 2015) ISBN 978-0990903529
- I Am the Oil of the Engine of the World Split Lip Press (February 23, 2016) ISBN 978-0990903567
- The People Are Going to Rise Like the Waters on Your Shore: A Story of American Rage (September 12, 2017) ISBN 978-1619029569.
- The Man They Wanted Me to Be: Toxic Masculinity and a Crisis of Our Own Making (May 7, 2019) ISBN 978-1640093850
- American Rule: How A Nation Conquered The World But Failed Its People Dutton/Penguin-Random House (September 15, 2020)ISBN 9781524745714
- The Midnight Kingdom: A History of Power, Paranoia, and the Coming Crisis, Penguin-Random House (Jan 17, 2023) ISBN 9780593185230

=== Articles ===
- "American Horror Story," The New Republic, June 2016.
- "Is the Trump Campaign Just a Giant Safe Space for the Right?", The New York Times, July 2016.
- "Donald Trump's Toxic Masculinity," The New York Times, October 2016.
- "Hillbilly sellout: the politics of J.D. Vance's Hillbilly Elegy are already being used to gut the working poor," Salon, March 2016.
