= The Greg Behrendt Show =

- Developed by: Sony Pictures Television
- Presented by: Greg Behrendt
- Narrated by: Pete Sepenuk
- Country of origin: United States
- Original language: English

Production
- Running time: 60 minutes
- Production companies: Avalon Television Inc. Sony Pictures Television

Original release
- Network: Syndication
- Release: September 12, 2006 – February 28, 2007

The Greg Behrendt Show is a daytime talk show that premiered in syndication on September 12, 2006. The show was distributed by Sony Pictures Television and was taped at Sony Pictures Studios in Culver City.

In addition to airing in syndication, the show was carried nationwide over Superstation WGN, which aired the show at 2 PM ET until its final weeks when they moved the show to 2 AM ET. The network replaced the show with The Steve Wilkos Show in the slot following its final episode. The show was also streamed on the Sony website.

== Show format ==
Stand-up comedian and writer Greg Behrendt presided over a show that more often than not discussed relationship problems with couples of all types. Other episodes included makeover shows (called "Greg-overs" on the show) and confrontations about other issues not related to a relationship.

In each and every episode, the following segments aired:

- The Uncomfortable Phone Call: Greg and a guest would speak with someone on the phone (who could be heard in the studio) and discuss a problem that the guest and that person had.
- Greg Behrendt Undercover: Towards the end of every episode, a hidden camera segment featuring Behrendt would focus on something in a humorous manner (e.g., how a supermarket is really a haven for any kind of sexual fetish you might have).

== Ratings history ==
Behrendt's show was one of four syndicated talk shows to debut in the fall of 2006 (Rachael Ray, Dr. Keith Ablow, and The Megan Mullally Show were the other three), and much like every series except for Rachael Ray suffered in the ratings. During the first sweeps period of the new season, The Greg Behrendt Show was actually the lowest rated of the four new syndicated offerings with an 0.7 rating. As 2007 came, the ratings improved slightly, with Behrendt actually pulling an 0.9 to pass Megan Mullally for third (although after the latter program's cancellation), but the ratings were still not good enough for Sony to keep the show going and they announced its cancellation on January 25, 2007, making it the second of the new fall talk shows to get the ax (The Megan Mullally Show, canceled on January 4, was the first, with Dr. Keith Ablow rounding out the list in February). The Greg Behrendt Show continued to air new episodes until the end of February, at which point the show went into reruns which continued until September 7, 2007.
