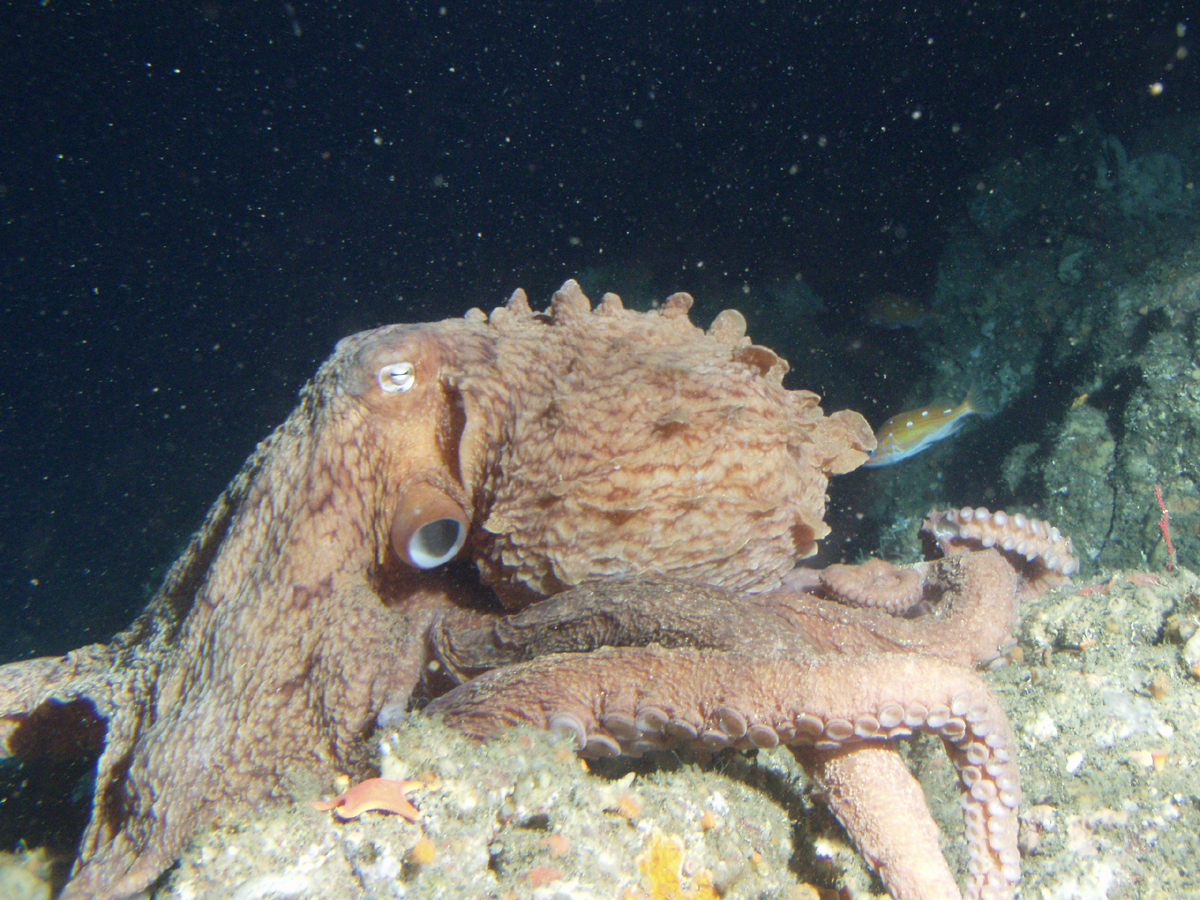
- E. dofleini observed off Point Piños, California, at a depth of 65 m (213 ft)

Conservation status
- Least Concern (IUCN 3.1)

Scientific classification
- Kingdom: Animalia
- Phylum: Mollusca
- Class: Cephalopoda
- Order: Octopoda
- Family: Enteroctopodidae
- Genus: Enteroctopus
- Species: E. dofleini

Binomial name
- Enteroctopus dofleini (Wülker, 1910)
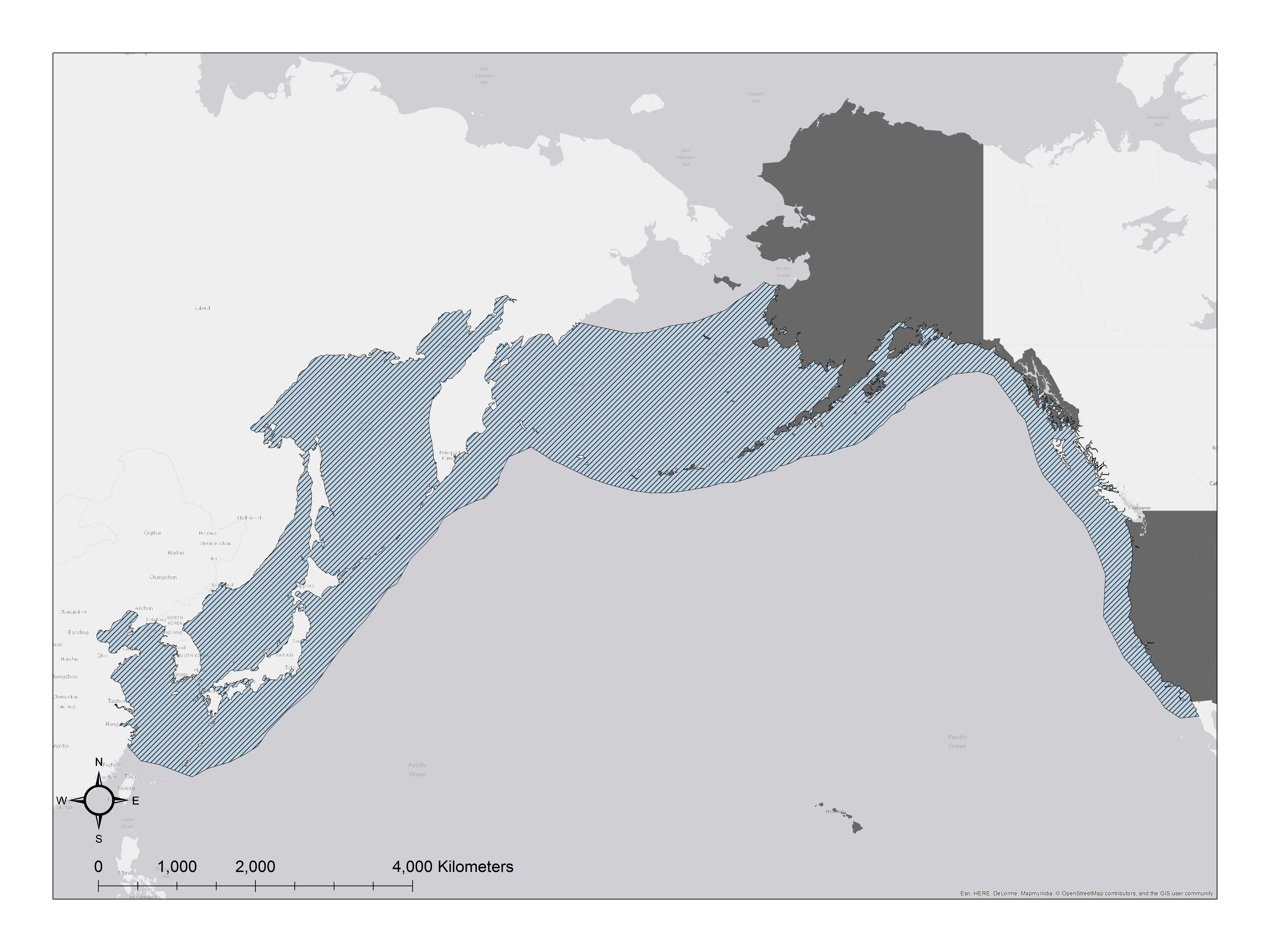
- range of E. dofleini

Synonyms
- Octopus punctatus Gabb, 1862; Octopus dofleini Wülker, 1910; Polypus dofleini Wülker, 1910; Octopus dofleini dofleini (Wülker, 1910); Polypus apollyon Berry, 1912; Octopus dofleini apollyon (Berry, 1912); Polypus gilbertianus Berry, 1912; Octopus gilbertianus Berry, 1912; Octopus apollyon (Berry, 1913); Octopus madokai Berry, 1921; Paroctopus asper Akimushkin, 1963; Octopus dofleini martini Pickford, 1964

= Giant Pacific octopus =

Giant Pacific octopus Temporal range: Pleistocene to recent

Species of cephalopod

The giant Pacific octopus (Enteroctopus dofleini), also known as the North Pacific giant octopus, is a large marine cephalopod belonging to the genus Enteroctopus and Enteroctopodidae family.

Its spatial distribution encompasses much of the coastal North Pacific, from the Mexican state of Baja California, north along the United States' West Coast (California, Oregon, Washington and Alaska, including the Aleutian Islands), and British Columbia, Canada; across the northern Pacific to the Russian Far East (Kamchatka, Sea of Okhotsk), south to the East China Sea, the Yellow Sea, the Sea of Japan, Japan's Pacific east coast, and around the Korean Peninsula. It can be found from the intertidal zone down to 2,000 m (6,600 ft), and is best-adapted to colder, oxygen- and nutrient-rich waters. It is the largest octopus species on earth and can often be found in aquariums and research facilities in addition to the ocean. E. dofleini play an important role in maintaining the health and biodiversity of deep sea ecosystems, cognitive research, and the fishing industry.

== Etymology ==
The giant Pacific octopus was first described in 1910 by Gerhard Wülker of Leipzig University in Über Japanische Cephalopoden. He describes the species' morphology in detail, and mentions that there seems to be much variation within the species. The specific name dofleini was chosen by Gerhard Wülker in honor of German scientist Franz Theodor Doflein. It was moved to genus Enteroctopus by Eric Hochberg in 1998.

== Description ==
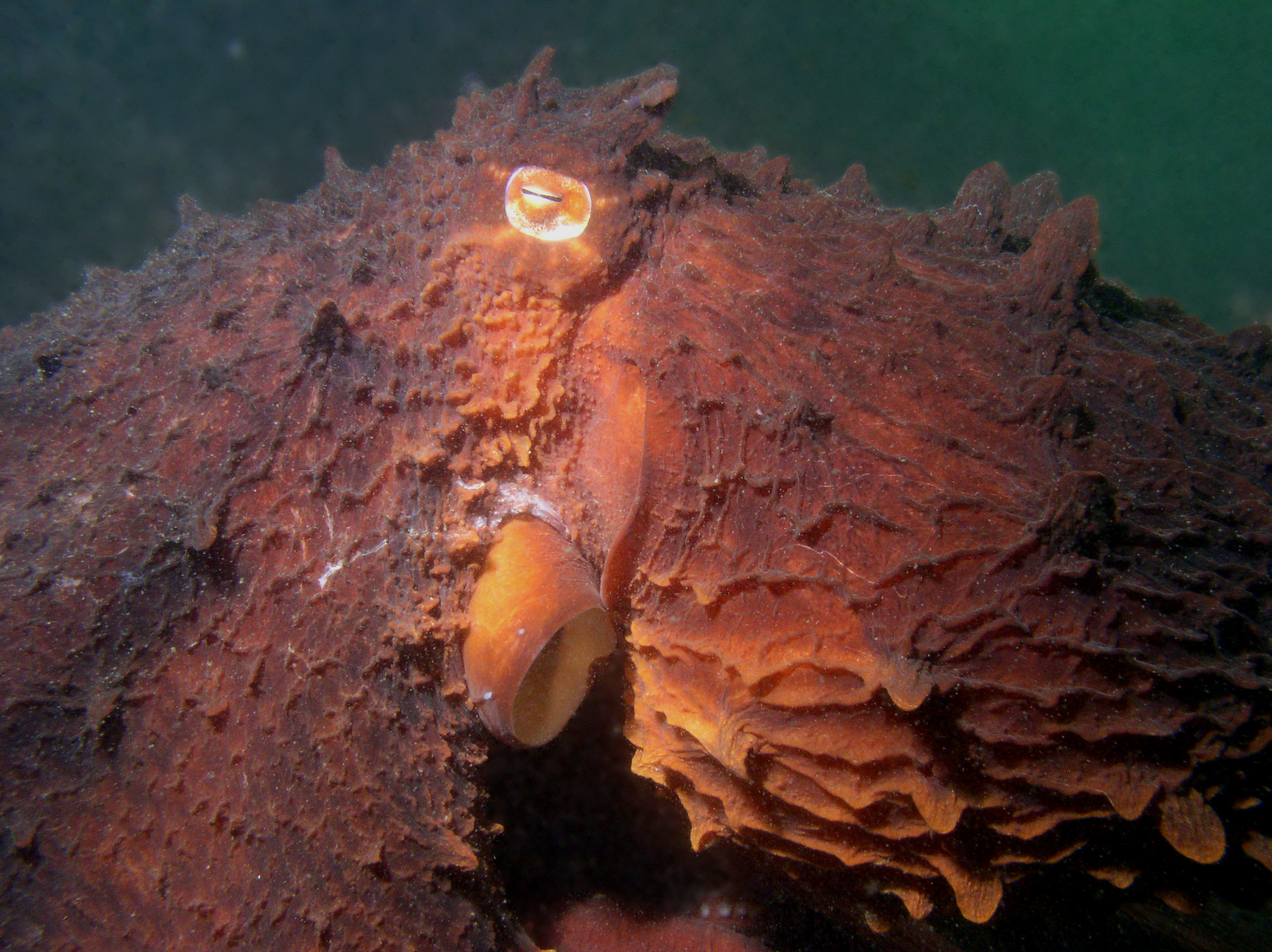
Close-up showing one of the eyes, siphon, longitudinal folds on the body and the paddle-like papillae

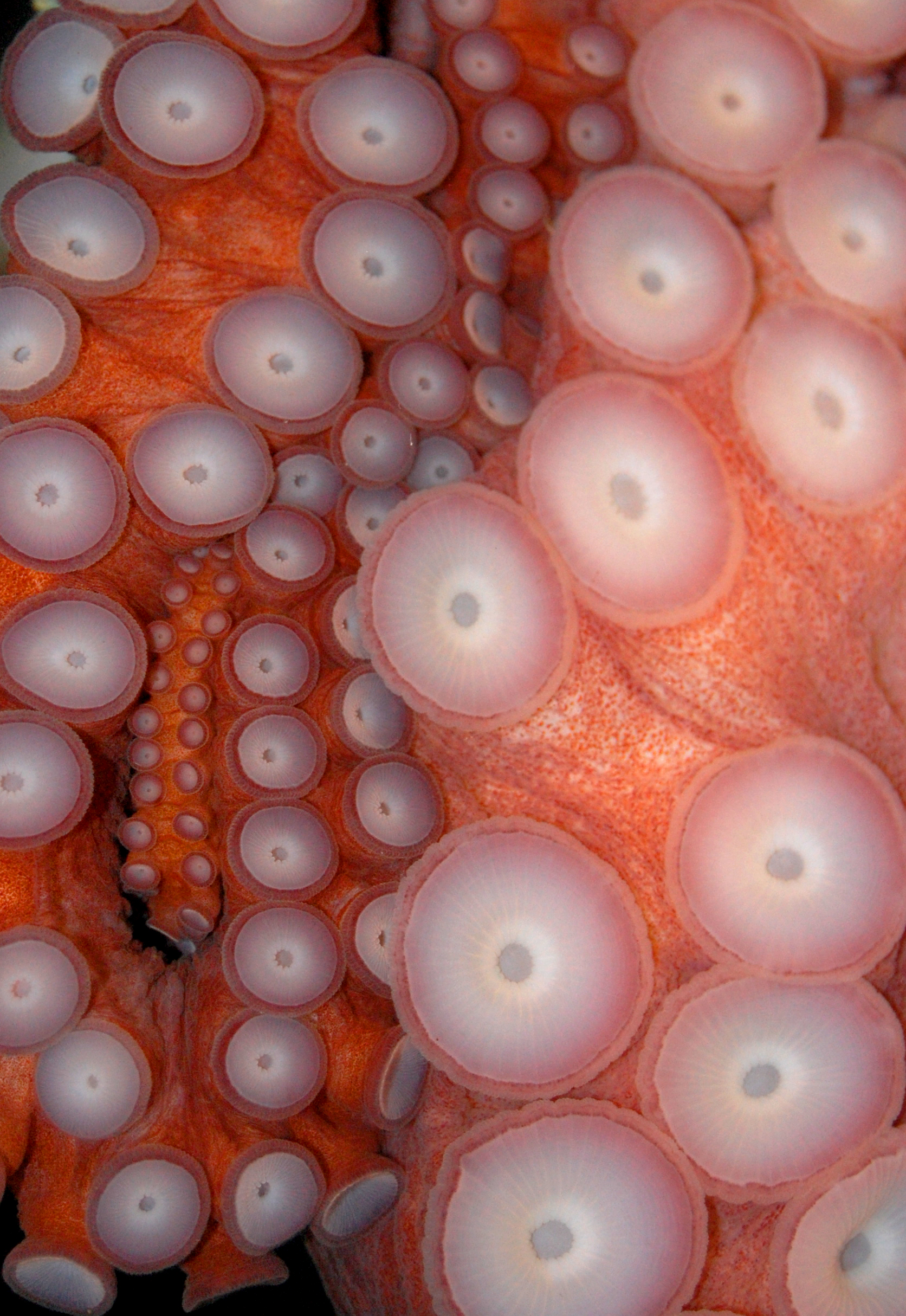
Close-up of suckers

=== Size ===
E. dofleini is distinguished from other species by its large size. It is the largest octopus species. Adults usually weigh around 15 kg (33 lb), with an arm span up to 4.3 m (14 ft). The largest individual may have weighed in at 600 lb (270 kg), with a radial span of 32 ft (9.8 m), according to the fisherman who caught it. Other large specimens caught while commercial fishing may have weighed as much as 400 lb (180 kg).

British zoologist G. H. Parker found that the largest suckers on a giant Pacific octopus are about 6.4 cm (2.5 in) and can support 16 kg (35 lb) each.

== Ecology ==
=== Diet ===
E. dofleini preys on shrimp, crabs, scallops, abalones, cockles, snails, clams, lobsters, fish, squid, and other octopuses. Food is procured with its suckers and then bitten using its tough beak of chitin. It has also been observed to catch spiny dogfish (Squalus acanthias) up to 1.2 m (4 ft) in length while in captivity. Additionally, consumed carcasses of this same shark species have been found in giant Pacific octopus middens in the wild, providing strong evidence of these octopuses preying on small sharks in their natural habitat. In May 2012, amateur photographer Ginger Morneau was widely reported to have photographed a wild giant Pacific octopus attacking and drowning a seagull, demonstrating that this species may eat any available source of food within its size range, even birds.

=== Predators ===
Scavengers and other organisms often attempt to eat octopus eggs, even when the female is present to protect them. Giant Pacific octopus paralarvae are preyed upon by many other zooplankton and filter feeders. Marine mammals, such as harbor seals, sea otters, and sperm whales depend upon the giant Pacific octopus as a source of food. Pacific sleeper sharks are also confirmed predators of this species. In addition, the octopus (along with cuttlefish and squid) is a significant source of protein for human consumption. About 3.3 million tonnes (3.6 million short tons) are commercially fished, worth $6 billion annually. Over thousands of years, humans have caught them using lures, spears, pot traps, nets, and bare hands. The octopus is parasitized by the mesozoan Dicyemodeca anthinocephalum, which lives in its renal appendages.

=== Movement patterns ===
E. dofleini move through the open water using jet propulsion, which is achieved by drawing water into its body cavity and then forcefully expelling it through a siphon, creating a powerful thrust and propelling the octopus through the water at a high speed. When moving on the seafloor, however, the octopus crawls using its arms.

E. dofleini remain stationary or in hiding 94% of the time, usually concealed within dens, kelp, or camouflaged in their environment. Otherwise, they exhibit activity throughout the day, increasingly so from midnight to the early morning. While stationary, E. dofleini hide, groom, eat, sleep, and maintain dens. E. dofleini are capable of moving vast distances to occupy new areas or habitats, with large octopuses moving further than smaller ones. Their movements are not random; they demonstrate a preference for habitats with dense kelp cover and rocky terrain suggesting a sophisticated level of habitat selection, likely optimizing foraging efficiency and minimizing exposure to predators. Furthermore, their movement patterns include direct relocations to new areas and central-tendency movements to return to familiar habitats. This navigation behavior is influenced by the use of familiar cliff edges, substrates, and topography as well as visual navigation.

E. dofleini migration patterns vary depending on the population. In the eastern Pacific waters off the coast of Japan, migration coincides with seasonal temperature changes in the winter and summer. Here, E. dofleini migrate to shallower waters in the early summer and winter and offshore in the late summer and winter. There is no evidence of these migration patterns in the Alaskan and northeast Pacific populations of E. dofleini.

=== Shelter ===
E. dofleini are den dwellers, which serve as a central point from which they forage while also providing protection, shelter, and privacy. After hunting, they bring food back to the den to feed in a safer environment and avoid predators. Shells, bones, and other feeding debris pile up outside of the den, creating "den litter" that is commonly used by scientists and divers to find E. dofleini.

Dens range across depth and substratum type including caves, holes dug beneath rock, and even trash on the ocean floor such as bottles, tires, pipes, and barrels. Den selection is greatly influenced by foraging behavior and preferred prey. Dens made of soft substrata may be preferred in areas where bivalves are abundant while dens near rocky areas might be chosen in areas with higher crab populations. The size of the den is small, usually being just large enough for the octopus to fit inside and turn around. E. dofleini beak size determines the size of the space it can fit inside, with its body being able to compress through tiny spaces as small as 50 mm (2 in). E. dofleini prefer to occupy same shelter for at least one month, often longer if possible. It is common for these octopus to leave their den for short periods of time and eventually return to re-use the same den. However, over longer periods of time, E. dofleini relocate to new dens situated relatively nearby, within an average distance of 13.2 meters.

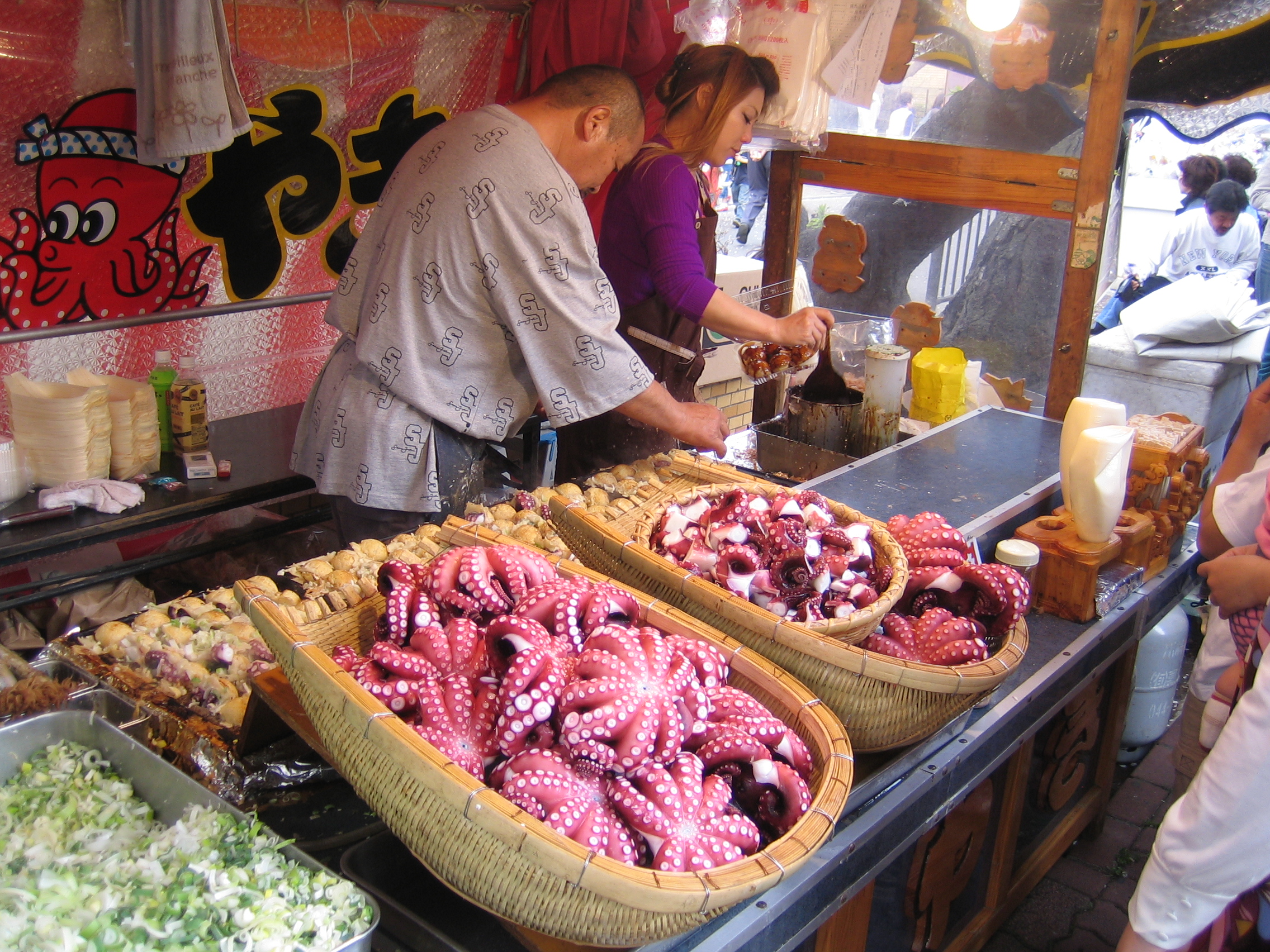
Takoyaki stall in Nishi-Magome, Tokyo

== Lifespan and reproduction ==
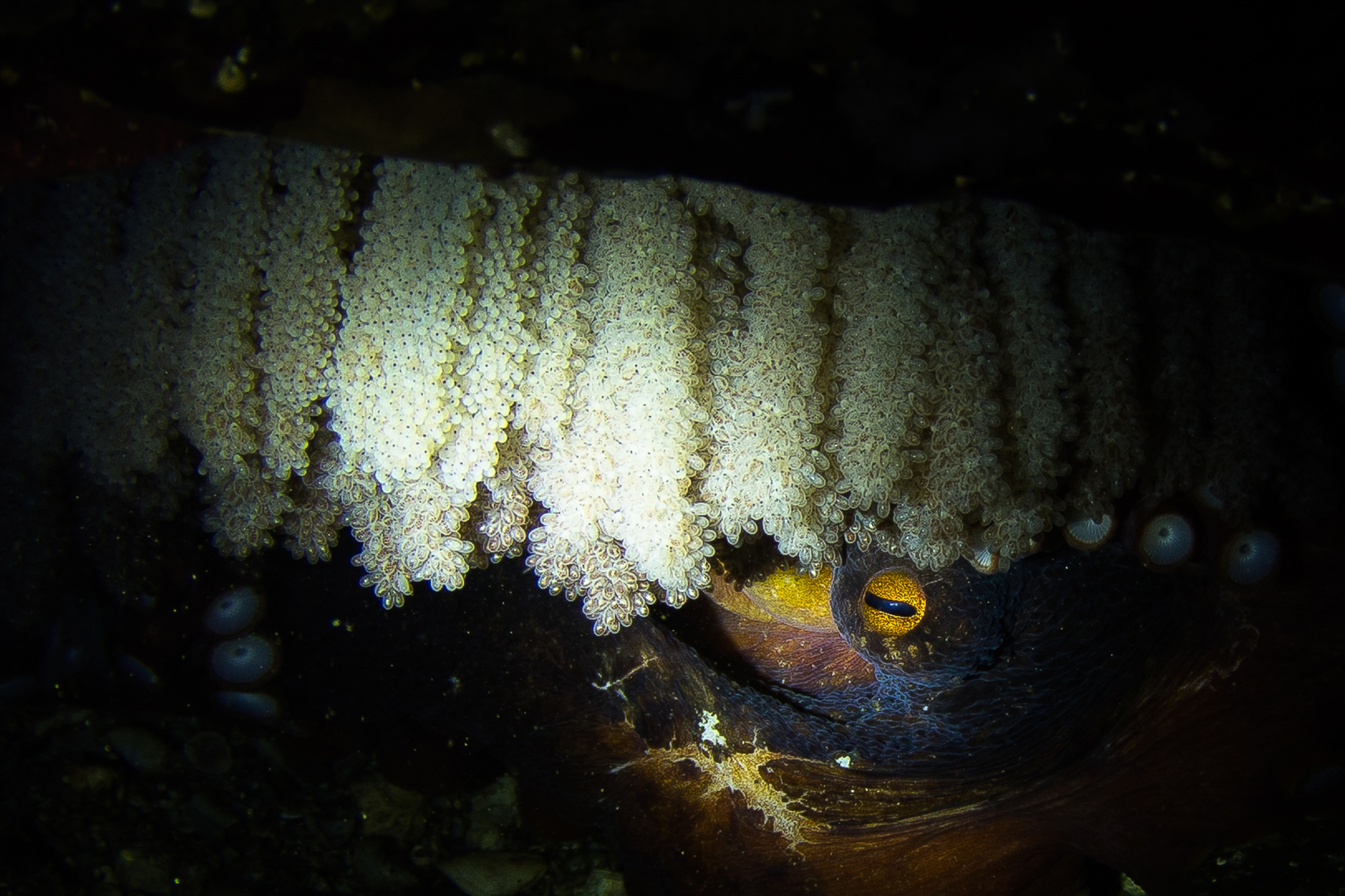
Enteroctopus dofleini spawning

Unlike most other octopus species, whose lifespans normally last only one year, the giant Pacific octopus has a lifespan of three to five years. They reach sexual maturity at one to two years of age. Gonadal maturation has been linked to the optic gland of octopuses which has been compared functionally to the vertebrate pituitary gland. These optic glands are the only endocrine glands identified in octopuses, and their secretions have been found to contribute to behaviors linked with reproduction and senescence. When removed, females no longer brood their eggs, resume feeding, increase in weight, and experience longer lifespans compared to sexually mature, brooding females who still retain their optic glands.

To help compensate for its relatively short lifespan, the octopus is extremely prolific. It can lay between 120,000 and 400,000 eggs which are coated in chorion, and attached to a hard surface by the female. The spawn is intensively cared for exclusively by the female, who continuously blows water over it and grooms it to remove algae and other growths. While she fulfills her duty of parental care the female stays close to her spawn, never leaving to feed, leading to her death soon after the young have hatched. The female's death is the result of starvation, as she subsists on her own body fats during this period of approximately 6 months. Hatchlings are about the size of a grain of rice, and very few survive to adulthood. Their growth rate is quite rapid: starting from 0.03 g (0.0011 oz) and growing to 20–40 kg (44–88 lb) at adulthood, which is an increase of around 0.9% per day. The giant Pacific octopus' growth over the course of a year has two sections: a faster section, from July to December, and a slower section, from January to June. Because they are cool-blooded, they are able to use most of their consumed energy for body mass, respiration, physical activity, and reproduction. During reproduction, the male octopus deposits a spermatophore (or sperm packet) more than 1 m (3.3 ft) long using his hectocotylus (specialized arm) in the female's mantle. The hectocotylus is found on the third arm of male octopuses and occupies the last four inches of the arm. This part of the male arm anatomy contains no suckers. Large spermatophores are characteristic of octopuses in this genus. The female stores the spermatophore in her spermatheca until she is ready to fertilize her eggs. One female at the Seattle Aquarium was observed to retain a spermatophore for seven months before laying fertilized eggs.

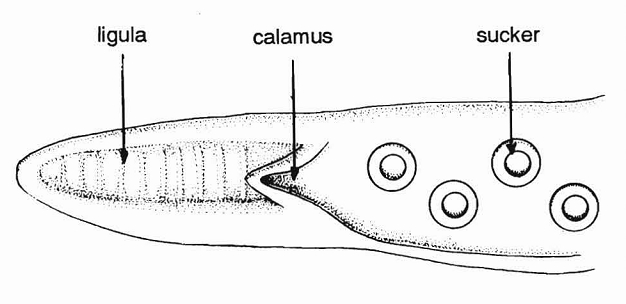
Hectocotylus arm of an octopod

Both male and female giant Pacific octopuses are semelparous, meaning they only go through one breeding cycle in their life. Analysis of egg clutches has shown evidence of polygyny and polyandry in giant Pacific octopuses, where males and females mate with multiple partners. This multiple paternity potentially allows females to increase the odds of at least one of the males she mates with producing fit offspring. After mating, both the males and females stop eating and ultimately die. After reproduction, they enter senescence, which involves obvious changes in behavior and appearance, including a reduced appetite, retraction of skin around the eyes giving them a more pronounced appearance, increased activity in uncoordinated patterns, and white lesions all over the body. While the duration of this stage is variable, it typically lasts about one to two months. Despite active senescence primarily occurring over this period immediately following reproduction, research has shown that changes related to senescence may begin as early as the onset of reproductive behavior. In early stages of senescence, which begins as the octopus enters the stage of reproduction, hyper-sensitivity is noted where individuals overreact to both noxious and non-noxious touch. As they enter late senescence, insensitivity is observed along with the dramatic physical changes described above. Changes in sensitivity to touch are attributed to decreasing cellular density in nerve and epithelial cells as the nervous system degrades. Death is typically attributed to starvation, as the females have stopped hunting in order to protect their eggs; males often spend more time in the open, making them more likely to be preyed upon.

== Intelligence ==
Octopuses are ranked as the most intelligent invertebrates. Giant Pacific octopuses are commonly kept on display at aquariums due to their size and interesting physiology, and have demonstrated the ability to recognize humans with whom they frequently come in contact. These responses include jetting water, changing body texture, and other behaviors that are consistently demonstrated to specific individuals. They have the ability to solve simple puzzles, open childproof bottles, and use tools. The octopus brain has folded lobes (a distinct characteristic of complexity) and visual and tactile memory centers. They have about 300 million neurons. They have been known to open tank valves, disassemble expensive equipment, and generally wreak havoc in labs and aquaria. Some researchers even claim that they are capable of motor play and having personalities.

== Conservation and climate change ==
=== Conservation ===
Giant Pacific octopuses are not currently under the protection of Convention on International Trade in Endangered Species of Wild Fauna and Flora or evaluated in the IUCN Red List. DNA techniques have assisted in genetic and phylogenetic analysis of the species' evolutionary past. Following its DNA analysis, the giant Pacific octopus may actually prove to be three subspecies (one in Japan, another in Alaska, and a third in Puget Sound).

In Puget Sound, the Washington Fish and Wildlife Commission adopted rules for protecting the harvest of giant Pacific octopuses at seven sites, after a legal harvest caused a public outcry. Populations in Puget Sound are not considered threatened.

=== The seafood industry ===
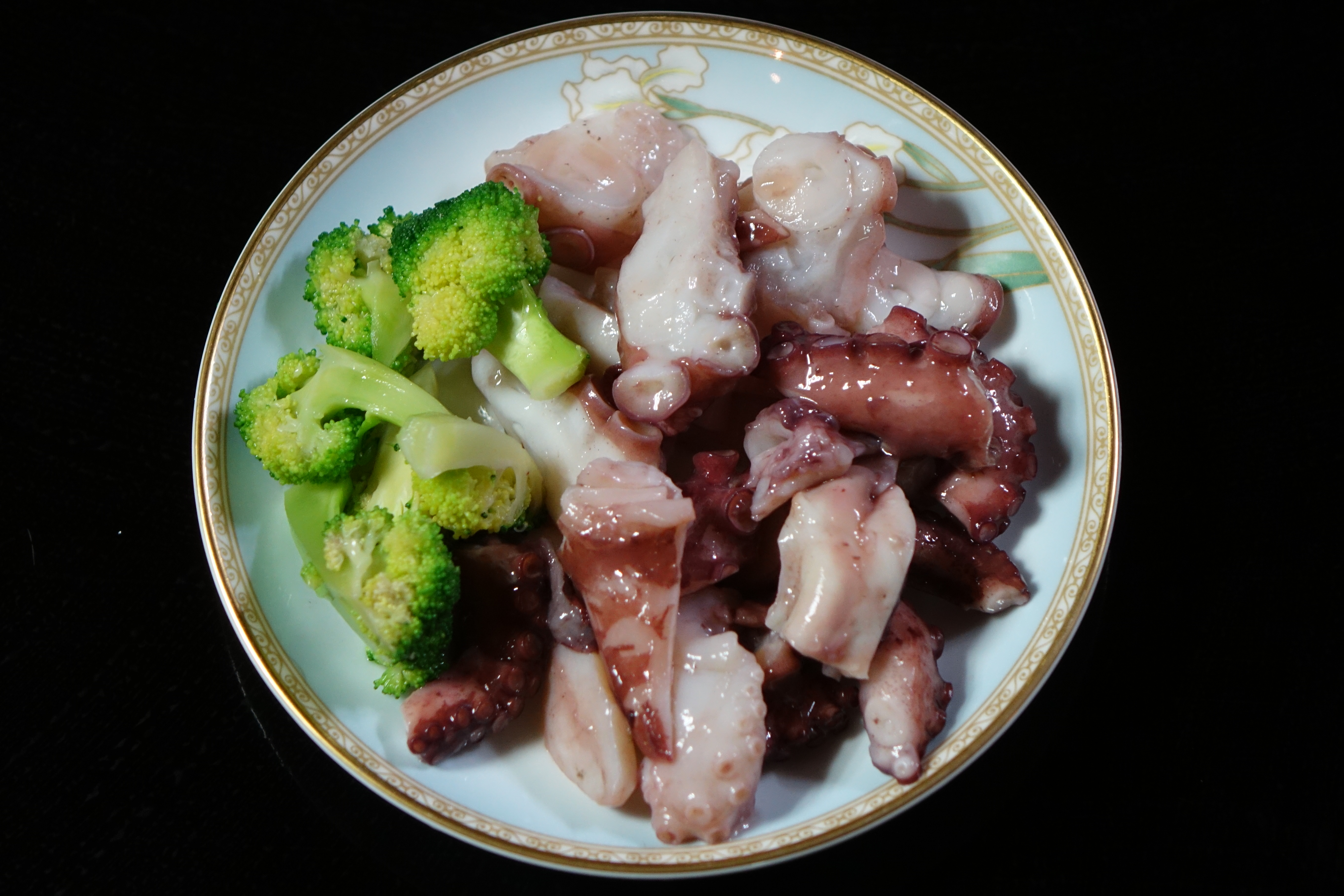
Korean sukhoe made of giant octopus

Fraud is an issue in the seafood industry, with species names being switched by accident or on purpose, as in the case of using the name of a more expensive species for a cheaper one. Cephalopods, in particular, lose distinguishing characteristics during food processing, making them much harder to identify. One study developed a multiplex PCR assay to distinguish between three prevalent octopus species in the Eastern Pacific, namely, the giant Pacific octopus, the big blue octopus, and the common octopus, in order to accurately identify these species and help to prevent seafood fraud. Combined with lack of assessment and mislabeling, tracking the species's abundance is nearly impossible. Scientists have relied on catch numbers to estimate stock abundance, but the animals are solitary and difficult to find. Sites like The Monterey Bay Aquarium Seafood Watch can help people to responsibly consume seafood, including the giant Pacific octopus. Seafood Watch lists giant Pacific octopus in either the "Buy" or "Buy, but be aware of concerns" categories depending on the geographical location of the catch.

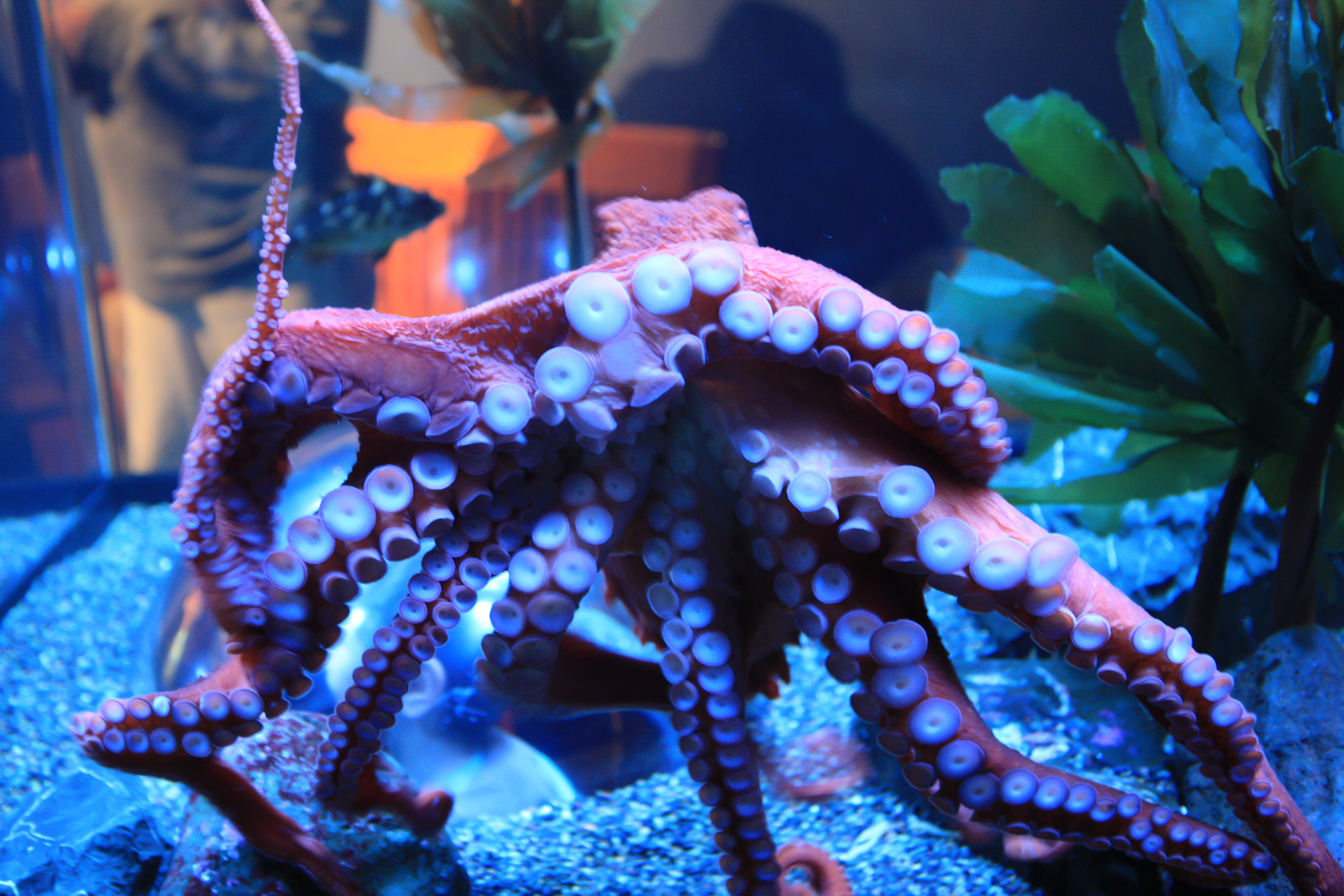
Giant Pacific octopus

=== Oxygen limitation ===
Octopuses have been found to migrate for a variety of reasons. Using tag and recapture methods, scientists found they move from den to den in response to decreased food availability, change in water quality, increase in predation, or increased population density (or decreased available habitat/den space). Since their blue blood is copper-based (hemocyanin) and not an efficient oxygen carrier, octopuses favor and move toward cooler, oxygen-rich water. This dependency limits octopus habitat, typically to temperate waters 8–12 °C (46–54 °F). If seawater temperatures continue to rise, these organisms may be forced to move to deeper, cooler water.

Each fall in Washington's Hood Canal, a habitat for many octopuses, phytoplankton and macroalgae die and create a dead zone. As these micro-organisms decompose, oxygen is used up in the process and has been measured to be as low as 2 parts per million (ppm). This is a state of hypoxia. Normal levels are measured at 7–9 ppm. Fish and octopuses move from the deep towards the shallow water for more oxygen. Females do not leave, and die with their eggs at nesting sites. Warming seawater temperatures promote phytoplankton growth, and annual dead zones have been found to be increasing in size. To avoid these dead zones, octopuses must move to shallower waters, which may be warmer in temperature and less oxygen-rich, trapping them between two low-oxygen zones.

=== Reproduction ===
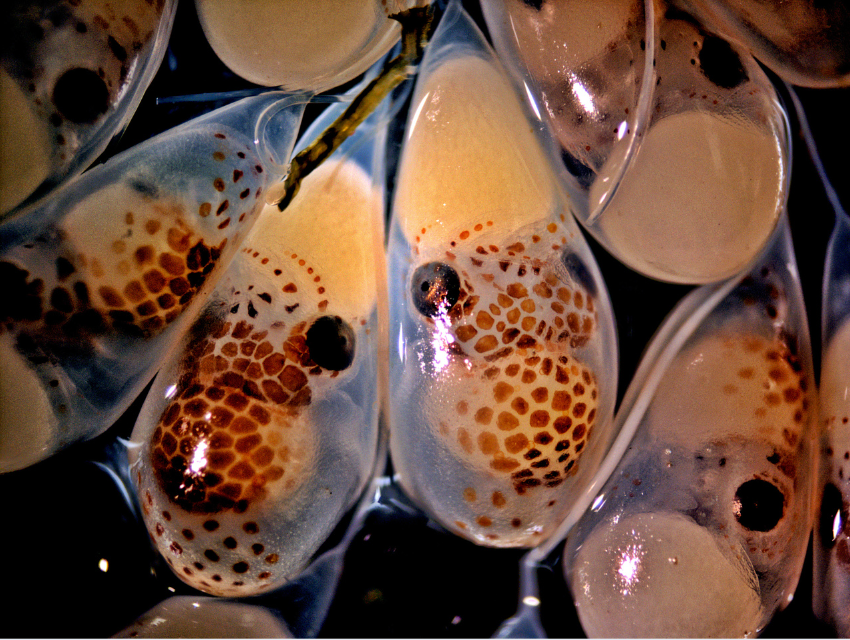
Hatchlings

Increased seawater temperatures also increase metabolic processes. The warmer the water, the faster octopus eggs develop and hatch. After hatching, the paralarvae swim to the surface to join other plankton, where they are often preyed upon by birds, fish, and other plankton feeders. Quicker hatching time may also affect critical timing for food availability. One study found that higher water temperatures accelerated all aspects of reproduction and even shortened lifespan by up to 20%. Other studies concur that warming climate scenarios should result in higher embryo and paralarvae mortalities.

=== Ocean acidification ===
The burning of fossil fuels, deforestation, industrialization, and other land-use changes cause increased carbon dioxide levels in the atmosphere. The ocean absorbs an estimated 30% of emitted anthropogenic CO_{2}. As the ocean absorbs CO_{2}, it becomes more acidic and lowers in pH. Ocean acidification lowers available carbonate ions, which is a building block for calcium carbonate (CaCO_{3}). Calcifying organisms use calcium carbonate to produce shells, skeletons, and tests. The prey base that octopuses prefer (crab, clams, scallops, mussels, etc.) are negatively impacted by ocean acidification, and may decrease in abundance. Shifts in available prey may force a change in octopus diets to other, nonshelled organisms.

Because octopuses have hemocyanin as copper-based blood, a small change in pH can reduce oxygen-carrying capacity. A pH change from 8.0 to 7.7 or 7.5 will have life-or-death effects on cephalopods.

=== Toxins ===
Researchers have found high concentrations of heavy metals and PCBs in tissues and digestive glands, which may have come from these octopus' preferred prey, the red rock crab (Cancer productus). These crabs bury themselves in contaminated sediments and eat prey that live nearby. What effects these toxins have on octopuses are unknown, but other exposed animals have been known to show liver damage, changes in immune systems, and death.

=== Effects on other trophic levels ===
Potential changes in octopus populations will affect upper and lower trophic levels. Lower trophic levels include all prey items, and may fluctuate inversely with octopus abundance. Higher trophic levels include all predators of octopuses, and may fluctuate with octopus abundance, although many may prey upon a variety of organisms. Protection of other threatened species may affect octopus populations (the sea otter, for example), as they may rely on octopuses for food. Some research suggests that fishing other species has aided octopus populations, by taking out predators and competitors.

== See also ==
- Octopus wrestling
