= Oofty Goofty =

Sideshow performer

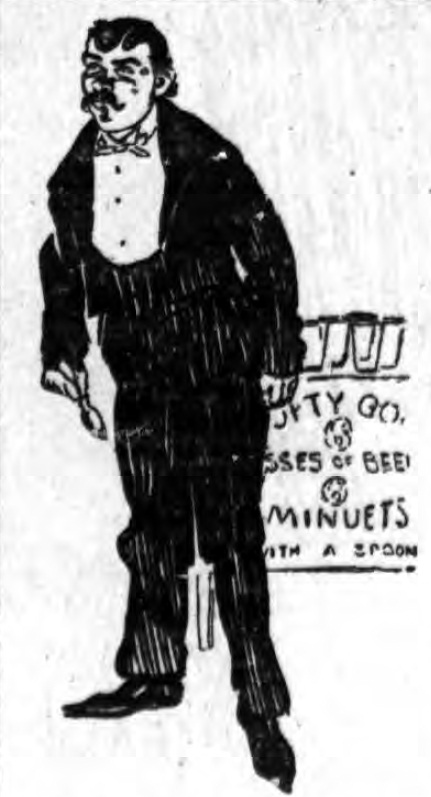
- Oofty Goofty
- Born: Leonard Borchardt; 26 April 1862; Berlin, Kingdom of Prussia
- Other name: Leon Borchardt
- Occupation: Sideshow performer
- Years active: c. 1884–1923
- Known for: Performing as the "Wild Man of Borneo" and for endurance acts in which spectators paid to strike him

Leonard "Leon" Borchardt (April 26, 1862 – death date unknown), better known as Oofty Goofty, was a German sideshow performer who lived in San Francisco, California in the late 19th century and Houston, Texas in the early 20th century.

== Early life ==
In 1900, Goofty told a Houston Daily Post reporter that he emigrated to the U.S. on the SS Fresia as a stowaway in 1876, was found by the captain and made to work for three crossings to earn his passage, and was finally able to immigrate by 1878. According to Goofty, he drifted from city to city before finding himself penniless in Detroit, Michigan during a snowstorm on January 27, 1883, and enlisted in the United States Army for five years. Goofty was placed in Company K of the First Cavalry and stationed at the Jefferson Barracks Military Post.

He was described as being 5 ft 4 in tall, with brown eyes, black hair, and a dark complexion. Goofty said that his fellow soldiers teased him because he was Jewish; he would be the first man the Native Americans would scalp in a fight. When orders came deploying him to Washington Territory, he deserted shortly afterwards on April 9, 1883. He was apprehended the same day, and then escaped from military custody a few days later.

== Career ==
In his 1933 book, The Barbary Coast, Herbert Asbury wrote that Borchardt got the name "Oofty Goofty" from a February 1884 appearance at a Market Street sideshow, where he was billed as the "Wild Man of Borneo".

Borchardt was covered from head to toe with road tar, into which horsehair was stuck. This gave him a savage and ferocious appearance. He was then locked in a cage, and people paid a dime to look at the “wild man” supposedly captured in the jungles of Borneo and brought to San Francisco at enormous expense. To add to the realism, large chunks of raw meat were poked between the bars by an attendant, and the "wild man" gobbled ravenously, occasionally growling, shaking the bars, and yelping, “Oofty goofty! Oofty goofty!”

Oofty's career as a “wild man” came to an end after about a week, when he took ill, believed to be because he was unable to perspire because of the tar on his skin. Doctors at the city's Receiving Hospital tried for days to remove the tar, but could not do so, presumably because of the horsehair. The tar finally came off after he was doused with tar solvent and left to lie on the hospital's roof.

Afterwards, according to an interview he gave in 1900, Oofty worked as baseball team mascot. After losing several games, members of the team kicked him and made him walk nearly a hundred miles back home.

Oofty gave an interview to the San Francisco Examiner, in which he described the "feat" for which he would become best known:

My stock in trade was a leather pad I wore in the seat of my trousers and my customers were young men, who would pay from 10 cents to $2, according to the thickness of the cane with which I would allow them to strike me with one blow as I bent forward over the back of a chair.

Nearly fifty years later, Asbury offered a very different version of this that appears to conflate fact and fiction. Asbury claimed that the genesis of Oofty's "whack me" business was his sudden discovery, upon being thrown out of a Barbary Coast saloon onto a hard cobblestone street, that he felt no physical pain. Asbury said that Oofty would tour San Francisco, baseball bat in hand, and invite anyone who would listen to kick him as hard as they could for 5 cents, smack him with a walking stick for 15 cents, or beat him with a baseball bat for 25 cents. Asbury went on to claim that John L. Sullivan struck Oofty across the back with a billiard cue, and that Oofty walked with a limp the rest of his life because of it.

On July 14, 1886, Oofty began a trek across the United States with a wheelbarrow, hoping to break a record. On the morning of July 15, 1886 he was knocked into a creek at Pinole, California by farm hands who were frightened by him, and called off his journey. He made his way to Sacramento and was told by the governor to leave town. In 1889, Oofty Goofty took part in a go-as-you-please walking match in California and walked 223 miles in six days. He appeared in many other California area walking matches during the next few years.

Afterwards, Goofty attempted to gain success through the stage and theater. He played Romeo opposite actress "Big Bertha's" Juliet, but the play proved disastrous.

In November 1892, Oofty was living in Montana and entertaining people with stories of his life. At that time he was claiming that he had sat down in water for several years and had become partially petrified, thus immune to pain. He was betting people $50 that they could not make him cry out in pain by hitting him with a drill.

== Later years ==
In the late 1890s, Oofty was living in Texas where he sold imitation diamonds and performed odd feats for money. In June 1900, he was living in a hotel in Houston, Texas. He appears again in the 1920 census, living in a hotel in Houston. He last appeared in the 1923 city directory for Houston, by which point he would have been 61 years old.

== Legal issues ==
At the age of 23, in June 1885, Borchardt was charged with libel in San Francisco, California, after accusing a man identified as C. Linear of offering him US$200 to burn down Linear's own house. A few days later, Borchardt was committed to the Home of the Inebriates, where he was to be examined by insanity commissioners.

While the case was being investigated, Borchardt's earlier desertion from the United States Army came to the attention of the authorities. He was subsequently sentenced to three years in military prison. Newspaper reports stated that Borchardt attempted to avoid punishment by feigning epileptic seizures, but the ruse was discovered. During his confinement, he also injured himself after jumping from a cliff. On September 18, 1885, still aged 23, Borchardt was released from military custody.

== In popular culture ==
- Oofty Goofty was parodied in the 1941 Frank Morgan film The Wild Man of Borneo, and in a 1937 Our Gang short film called The Kid From Borneo.
- He was referred to in a story by Bill Pronzini, "The Bughouse Caper". [Kurland, Michael (editor) "Sherlock Holmes – The Hidden Years" New York, St. Martin's Minotaur 2004].
- He was discussed in one of the "Freak Show" episodes of Wild West Tech.
- As part of a television series showcasing re-enactments of Victorian side show acts, vaudeville stunts and escapology, Jonathan Goodwin staged a tribute to Oofty Goofty by attempting to bring his feats of human endurance to a twenty-first-century television audience. Goodwin asked three separate professional cage fighters to kick, punch, and hit him with a baseball bat, while Goodwin attempted not to react to any of the ensuing pain.
- The story of Oofty Goofty is featured in episode 27 of American historical comedy podcast The Dollop, hosted by Dave Anthony and Gareth Reynolds.
- Frank Chin wrote a parable play about Oofty Goofty in 1983; although the play went through workshop rehearsals, it ultimately went unproduced.
