= The Dollop =

American history and comedy podcast

- Genre: Comedy; history
- Language: English

Cast and voices
- Hosted by: Dave Anthony; Gareth Reynolds

Production
- Length: Approx. 30–90 minutes

Publication
- No. of episodes: 724
- Original release: 25 April 2014
- Provider: All Things Comedy
- Updates: Weekly

Related
- Website: dolloppodcast.com

The Dollop is an American comedy history podcast in which comedian Dave Anthony reads stories from American history to his friend and fellow comedian Gareth Reynolds, who usually has no knowledge of the topic that will be discussed, with the two commenting on and reacting to the stories. Each episode centers on an event or person from history selected for its humor or peculiarity. Typical episodes feature stories or events that are usually, but not always, from American history; they are described by Anthony, and he and Reynolds often improvise comical scenarios.

== Background ==
Originally titled Dave's Dollop, the podcast began as a way of preparing for Anthony's one-man show at the Melbourne Comedy Festival, a solo project where he would simply talk about various subjects. Unsatisfied with the initial results, he decided to change to a focus on history and invite other comedians to listen and react to the stories. Reynolds was the first guest and was initially set to be replaced with a revolving cast of comedians, but after his performance, Anthony decided to keep him on as co-host. Anthony was inspired by the book A People's History of the United States by Howard Zinn, which made him realize that the history he was taught in school was often false or littered with disinformation in order to present the United States in a more positive light.

Reynolds and Anthony have recorded a number of live episodes in various U.S. cities, as well as Canada and five tours of Australia. Live episodes performed outside of the U.S. have featured stories from those respective countries; for example, topics covered in Australia included the Emu War and Arthur Phillip. Live shows both inside and outside the U.S. often include additional guest comedians, including Patton Oswalt, Wil Anderson, and My Favorite Murder hosts Georgia Hardstark and Karen Kilgariff. There are sometimes episodes called "Reverse Dollops", which consist of stories selected and read by Reynolds to Anthony, such as the episode on Nim Chimpsky. There are also shorter episodes called "Smollops", which usually last less than 30 minutes.

On 5 August 2019, the first season of The Dollop: England (& the UK) was announced. The first of ten episodes was released on 15 August. A sister podcast, called El Dollop, was announced on March 16, 2020. It is a Spanish-language version of The Dollop, hosted by Eduardo Espinosa, who reads to his co-host José Antonio Badía. There is also a Hungarian "version" (authorized by The Dollop) called Képtelen Krónika (Impossible Chronicle) where three hosts are covering various topics, mostly but not only from Hungarian history.

== Reception ==
Since its initial release in 2014, The Dollop has frequently ranked in the iTunes Top 100. In 2016, The Guardian rated the podcast as one of the 50 best podcasts of 2016.

== Controversy ==
On July 9, 2015, Alan Bellows of the history website and podcast Damn Interesting posted an open letter accusing The Dollop of plagiarism. Following this incident, Anthony claimed that all research and writing for new episodes was done by himself and others specifically for The Dollop, with sources referenced on a separate website. However, in August 2019, Slate national editor Josh Levin alleged that a 2017 live episode of The Dollop was lifted almost entirely from Levin's reporting with no public credit. Author Paul Brown further accused The Dollop of piecing together another 2017 episode from snippets of his book The Rocketbelt Caper.

== Book ==
In 2017, the two hosts released a book called United States of Absurdity: Untold Stories from American History, featuring 29 stories that had been discussed on the podcast.

== List of episodes ==
Episode No.	Date	Title	Special Guests	Notes
1	26 Apr 2014	Cliven Bundy		"Livin' like Cliven." Cliven Bundy refuses to pay a cow tax because he loves (but also doesn't understand) the Constitution.
2	5 May 2014	Purity Balls		"A bunch of religious virgins go to mingle and... pray." "Hey Dad, can I borrow the keys to the pussy?" Discusses purity balls, where Christian fathers take their very young daughters to prom, in order to ensure their virginity.
3	12 May 2014	Competitive Endurance Tickling		"Is it for fun?" Someone with an oddly specific fetish arranges for young men (preferably Asian) to tickle each other, and it gets borderline rapey.
4	19 May 2014	Ghosts		"And this is not going to become a tickling podcast." "All hail Queen Shit of Liesville!" Actual people believe in actual ghosts. Spoiler: It's because they are stupid.
5	26 May 2014	Hugh Glass		"Cunts!" First episode to address a historical topic, one which was later covered by the 2015 film The Revenant. Several later episodes refer to subjects as "The Hugh Glass of X", where X is... whatever they're talking about at that moment.
6	2 Jun 2014	The Tank Chase		Beleaguered man resorts to stealing tank rather than seeking therapy.
7	9 Jun 2014	American Vampire Panic		American colonists think that vampires are spreading tuberculosis.
8	16 Jun 2014	The Dolphin		A man who takes too much acid convinces a female colleague to enter into a sexual relationship with a dolphin.
9	23 Jun 2014	The Pendragon of Marin		A man pretending to be King Arthur tries to take over Dave's hometown with a homemade laser gun.
10	30 Jun 2014	The Jackson Cheese		When you have to accept a gift that you don't really want, things get awfully smelly.
11	7 Jul 2014	The Lobotomy Doctor		Somehow, The Dollop make us laugh while discussing abject horrors.
12	14 Jul 2014	The Rube		"Come on Rube, let's play!" "Now hit him with the puppy." Concerning Rube Waddell, a delightful simpleton and Dave's favorite baseball player.
13	21 Jul 2014	Colonial Teeth		Horror movie premise: By the time you're in your late 20s, all of your teeth fall out, so you have to install 18th-century dental implants every year or so.
14	28 Jul 2014	Carry A Nation		Large woman behaves violently, men too shocked to mount any response.
15	4 Aug 2014	Ten Cent Beer Night		Breaking: Studies find that abundant alcohol causes sports fans to behave poorly.
16	10 Aug 2014	The Two Daredevils (Note: Evel Knievel and Ken Carter (stuntman))		Discusses Evel Knievel and Ken Carter, men who have very different ideas about how they should destroy their bodies in order to earn money.
17	17 Aug 2014	Rainbow Man		"Oh Rainbow man, no!" Man decides to start spreading the word of The Lord, eventually resorts to taking hostages.
18	25 Aug 2014	The Chameleon		Remember when George tried to give Elaine a cashmere sweater with a stain on it? Imagine that, but the sweater is Elaine's dead son, and the stain is George making the whole thing up.
19	31 Aug 2014	Ferguson		
20	6 Sep 2014	David Hahn		Young white man does dangerous things because no one stops him.
21	13 Sep 2014	William Walker		Dumbass thinks he can start claiming sovereignty over countries just because he says so. It takes surprisingly long to stop him.
22	21 Sep 2014	The Rajneeshees		We don't have salad bars anymore because a religious cult was going around spraying salmonella on them.
23	29 Sep 2014	The Willie Dee		You know those crude, wacky submarine movies where the chef is fat, the radio officer is autistic, and the Captain has a tattoo on his dick? Turns out, that's pretty close to the truth. These guys fired a torpedo at FDR.
24	6 Oct 2014	John Africa and MOVE		If "arresting citizens without cause" doesn't make you hate cops, then maybe "bombing an entire city block" will.
25	11 Oct 2014	The Two Dog Men (Note: Kit Burns and Henry Bergh)		Are you an "animal person", or conversely, do "animal people" frustrate and annoy you? Hey don't worry, this episode will mess you up either way!
26	18 Oct 2014	The Subway Vigilante Bernhard Goetz		Sheltered white guy, fearful of subway, has a panic attack and shoots several others. Race War (somehow) does not ensue.
27	23 Oct 2014	Oofty Goofty		Smollop
28	26 Oct 2014	The Talk Board		
29	30 Oct 2014	The Pinto		Smollop
30	2 Nov 2014	The Taxidermist		
31	9 Nov 2014	Jack Parsons		
32	12 Nov 2014	The Leatherman		Smollop
33	16 Nov 2014	The Stomach Men		
34	20 Nov 2014	Dan Burros		Smollop
35	23 Nov 2014	Thanksgiving		
36	27 Nov 2014	Kentucky Meat Shower		Smollop
37	29 Nov 2014	AC/DC - Tesla vs Edison		
38	3 Dec 2014	Balloonfest		Smollop
39	7 Dec 2014	LAPD: The Beginning		
40	14 Dec 2014	LAPD 2 - The James Davis Years		
41	18 Dec 2014	Bad Ass Samuel Whittemore		Smollop
42	21 Dec 2014	LAPD 3 - Creation of SWAT		
43	24 Dec 2014	Pulgasari		Reverse Dollop
44	28 Dec 2014	LAPD 4 - Rampart		
45	31 Dec 2014	Lobster Boy		Smollop
46	3 Jan 2015	The Cereal Men	Patton Oswalt	Live
47	8 Jan 2015	Bricklayer Bill		
48	11 Jan 2015	Charles Guiteau	Wil Anderson	Live
49	Removed			
50	17 Jan 2015	Ugly Laws		
51	20 Jan 2015	Michael Malloy		Smollop
52	Removed			
53	Removed			
54	1 Feb 2015	Abolitionist Cassius Clay		
55	Removed			
56	7 Feb 2015	Newport Sex Scandal		
57	11 Feb 2015	Screenwriter Eric Red		
58	14 Feb 2015	Baseball Madman Lenny Dykstra		
59	19 Feb 2015	Colony Contrarian George Spencer		
60	22 Feb 2015	The Comet Panic		
61	25 Feb 2015	Jim Bowie and The Sandbar Fight		
62	1 Mar 2015	Goat Doctor John Brinkley		
63	Removed			
64	8 Mar 2015	Sports Fans of Philadelphia		
65	12 Mar 2015	Strange Case of William Shy		
66	16 Mar 2015	Tong Wars		
67	19 Mar 2015	Dogs Bummer and Lazarus		Smollop
68	22 Mar 2015	Centralia, Pennsylvania		
69	25 Mar 2015	Very Dead Elmer McCurdy		Smollop
70	28 Mar 2015	Obscenity Man Anthony Comstock		
71	1 Apr 2015	The Spite Fence		Smollop
72	5 Apr 2015	The Hanford Radiation Nightmare		
73	9 Apr 2015	Mike the Chicken		Smollop
74	13 Apr 2015	Mormon Tough Guy Porter Rockwell		
75	19 Apr 2015	Arthur Phillip and New South Wales	Luke McGregor	Live
76	26 Apr 2015	Australian Exorcists	Wil Anderson	Live
77	3 May 2015	Christian Artist Thomas Kinkade		
78	7 May 2015	The Dark Secret of American Swimming Pools		
79	9 May 2015	New Australia	Celia Pacquola, Tommy Dassalo	Live
80	15 May 2015	The Hollow Earth		
81	17 May 2015	The Lamb Funeral Home		
82	21 May 2015	Deborah Sampson		
83	24 May 2015	Boxer Tim "Doc" Anderson		
84	27 May 2015	Goody Davis and Elizabeth Howell		
85	1 Jun 2015	The Symbionese Liberation Army		
86	7 Jun 2015	Tom Dennison and The Omaha Riot		
87	10 Jun 2015	Action Park!		
88	15 Jun 2015	The Trojan Taco		
89	18 Jun 2015	The Murder of Russell Colvin		
90	21 Jun 2015	Childbirth in America		
91	25 Jun 2015	The Shanghai Kelly's		
92	28 Jun 2015	Owen Kildare		
93	30 Jun 2015	The Dole Plane Race		
94	5 Jul 2015	The Business Plot		
95	8 Jul 2015	Henry Heimlich		
96	12 Jul 2015	The Egg Nog Riot		
97	16 Jul 2015	Frank Fossett		
98	19 Jul 2015	DC Stephenson		
99	23 Jul 2015	The Radium Girls		
100	25 Jul 2015	Jade Helm		
101	29 Jul 2015	The Death of George Washington		
102	2 Aug 2015	Alfred Lawson and Lawsonomy	Al Madrigal	
103	6 Aug 2015	Octopus Wrestling		
104	9 Aug 2015	The Hippo Bill		
105	13 Aug 2015	Spiderman of Denver		
106	16 Aug 2015	The Fenian Raids		
107	19 Aug 2015	General Order No. 11		
108	23 Aug 2015	Douglas Mawson	Justin Hamilton	Live
109	26 Aug 2015	Mad Dan Morgan		Live
110	31 Aug 2015	Burke and Wills	Wil Anderson	Live
111	2 Sep 2015	The Emu War	Lindsay Webb	Live
112	5 Sep 2015	Prince Alfred Visits Australia	Celia Pacquola	Live
113	9 Sep 2015	Reg Spiers		Live
114	13 Sep 2015	Alexander Pearce	Wil Anderson	Live
115	16 Sep 2015	Rainmaker Charley Hatfield		
116	19 Sep 2015	The Actor Rivalry		
117	23 Sep 2015	Boston Corbett	Patton Oswalt	Live
118	27 Sep 2015	The Battle of Brisbane	Lindsay Webb	Live
119	30 Sep 2015	The Batavia Shipwreck		Live
120	4 Oct 2015	The Mad Gasser		
121	7 Oct 2015	The First New York Post Office		Smollop
122	11 Oct 2015	The Iraq War		
123	14 Oct 2015	The Yankee Pitcher Swap		
124	18 Oct 2015	The Fine Cotton Scandal	Wil Anderson	Live
125	22 Oct 2015	Puritans VS The Quakers		
126	25 Oct 2015	RA Cunningham and Tambo		
127	28 Oct 2015	Bank Robber Harry Pierpont		
128	31 Oct 2015	Nim The Chimp		Reverse Dollop
129	4 Nov 2015	Straw Hat Riot		
130	8 Nov 2015	The Bald Knobbers		
131	11 Nov 2015	John Ericsson and The Monitor		
132	18 Nov 2015	The Bone Wars		
133	23 Nov 2015	The Toxic Woman of Riverside		
134	25 Nov 2015	Count Dante		
135	2 Dec 2015	Stagecoach Mary		
136	6 Dec 2015	Bayou of Pigs		
137	9 Dec 2015	Phineas Gage		
138	13 Dec 2015	History of American Firefighters		
139	16 Dec 2015	The Story of Atari		Reverse Dollop
140	20 Dec 2015	The Pig War	Graham Clark, Dave Shumka	Live
141	23 Dec 2015	John Boyle O'Reilly and the Irish Escape	Justin Hamilton	Live
142	30 Dec 2015	Richard Johnson - A Terrible Vice President		
143	7 Jan 2016	The Broderick Terry Duel		
144	11 Jan 2016	The Fight Over Anesthesia		
145	13 Jan 2016	Squirrel Tooth Alice		
146	18 Jan 2016	Philadelphia Mayor Frank Rizzo		
147	21 Jan 2016	The Greenbrier Ghost		
148	24 Jan 2016	James Strang: Island Mormon		
149	28 Jan 2016	John Wayne Thompson's Armageddon		
150	1 Feb 2016	James Sullivan and the 1904 Olympic Games	Rory Scovel	Live
151	8 Feb 2016	The Oil Boomtowns of Texas		
152	11 Feb 2016	The Car Known as "The Dale"		
153	15 Feb 2016	The Brooke Hart Kidnapping		
154	21 Feb 2016	Ota Benga and Human Zoos		
155	27 Feb 2016	John Pemberton's Drug Tonics		
156	2 Mar 2016	The Marblehead Smallpox Riots		
157	7 Mar 2016	More University and One Taste Inc.		
158	9 Mar 2016	The Jumper - Robert Emmet Odium [sic]		
159	14 Mar 2016	Pedestrianism		
160	16 Mar 2016	Fed Ex Flight 705		
161	22 Mar 2016	The Killing of Maximum John		
162	24 Mar 2016	America's Greatest Sack of Flour		
163	27 Mar 2016	Syphilis in America		
164	30 Mar 2016	The Witch of Wall Street		
165	4 Apr 2016	The Racism of Maryland Route 40		
166	13 Apr 2016	The Racist Record Keeping of Virginia		
167	19 Apr 2016	The History of NY Sanitation	Ronny Cheing	Live
168	25 Apr 2016	America's First Crematorium	David Helem	Live
169	2 May 2016	Disco Demolition Night	Dave Helem	Live
170	5 May 2016	The Bowery Boys and Boxing		
171	8 May 2016	The Jones County Deserters		
172	12 May 2016	America's Worst Lottery Winner		
173	16 May 2016	The Know Nothing Party		
174	19 May 2016	The Hard Hat Riot		
175	23 May 2016	The Torture Psychologists (Note: Bruce Jessen and James Elmer Mitchell)		
176	26 May 2016	Bass Reeves		
177	29 May 2016	Jock and The Boston Marathon Women (Note: Kathrine Switzer and Bobbi Gibb)		
178	3 Jun 2016	The Bunion Derby		
179	6 Jun 2016	The Whiskey Rebellion		
180	8 Jun 2016	The Occupation of Alcatraz		
181	13 Jun 2016	Martin Tabert and Convict Leasing		
182	16 Jun 2016	Street Dentist Painless Parker		
183	20 Jun 2016	The Norco Shootout		
184	23 Jun 2016	The Brooklyn Bridge Crushing		
185	27 Jun 2016	Con Man Victor Lustig		
186	30 Jun 2016	John Dillinger's Penis		
187	4 Jul 2016	The History of Bowling in America		
188	7 Jul 2016	The Domino's Pizza Story		
189	11 Jul 2016	The Wilmington Coup		
190	14 Jul 2016	Fort Moore Hill		
191	18 Jul 2016	The Airships of 1896		
192	21 Jul 2016	Jackie Mitchell and Babe Ruth		
193	25 Jul 2016	When the Cars Came		
194	28 Jul 2016	The Girl Watchers		
195	1 Aug 2016	An American Pugilist in London		
196	4 Aug 2016	Killer Bees		
197	8 Aug 2016	The Orphans of New York City		
198	12 Aug 2016	Henry Tufts		
199	14 Aug 2016	Tony and The Shotgun		
200	18 Aug 2016	Otto in the Attic	Karen Kilgariff, Georgia Hardstark	
201	21 Aug 2016	Roger Babson's Fight		
202	29 Aug 2016	The Molly Maguires		
203	2 Sep 2016	The Sodder Children		
204	5 Sep 2016	The Real Crocodile Dundee	Wil Anderson	Live
205	13 Sep 2016	The Sydney Ducks	Wil Anderson	Live
206	17 Sep 2016	William Bligh	Nick Cody	Live
207	24 Sep 2016	The Animal Horror of Macquarie Island	Wil Anderson	Live
208	29 Sep 2016	The Australian Sex Philosopher	Nick Cody	Live
209	2 Oct 2016	John Macarthur	Justin Hamilton	Live
210	6 Oct 2016	The New Jersey Shark Attacks	Karen Kilgariff, Georgia Hardstark	Live
211	10 Oct 2016	The Tichborne Situation	Wil Anderson	Live
212	16 Oct 2016	Ned Kelly		Live
213	20 Oct 2016	Mashers and Hatpins		
214	24 Oct 2016	Black Panther Fred Hampton		
215	1 Nov 2016	Huey Long		
216	3 Nov 2016	Catastrophe Jim		
217	7 Nov 2016	Edmund and The Holy Rollers		
218	10 Nov 2016	The Donora Smog Disaster		
219	15 Nov 2016	The Terror of 1741		
220	17 Nov 2016	Tylenol Man		
221	21 Nov 2016	Oregon and The Ku Klux Klan		
222	27 Nov 2016	Marion Zioncheck	Wil Anderson	Live
223	1 Dec 2016	The Night of Terror		
224	5 Dec 2016	Bundy 2: Oregon Takeover	Wil Anderson	Live
225	8 Dec 2016	The Birth of Porn	Wil Anderson	Live
226	12 Dec 2016	The Brooklyn Train Strike		
227	15 Dec 2016	Whalesplosion		
228	19 Dec 2016	Boston Busing 1974		
229	20 Dec 2016	Boston Busing 1975		
230	22 Dec 2016	The Shoe Bandit		
231	30 Dec 2016	The Siamese Twins - Chang and Eng		
232	9 Jan 2017	Breaking Glenn Burke		
233	12 Jan 2017	American Summer Hitler Camps!		
234	16 Jan 2017	Daniel Sickles		
235	19 Jan 2017	The Great Diamond Hoax		
236	23 Jan 2017	Dope Lake		
237	26 Jan 2017	Jet Pack Madness		
238	29 Jan 2017	The Gopher Gang		
239	2 Feb 2017	Enron		
240	6 Feb 2017	North Pole Madness		
241	9 Feb 2017	The Two Indigenous Actors (Note: Iron Eyes Cody and Jay Silverheels)	Bert Kreischer	Live
242	13 Feb 2017	The Monkey Whisperer		
243	16 Feb 2017	The Gas Mask Man Garrett Morgan		
244	20 Feb 2017	The Battle of Hayes Pond		
245	23 Feb 2017	The Gentleman's Riot		
246	27 Feb 2017	British Comedian Tommy Cooper		Reverse Dollop
247	2 Mar 2017	The Falling Pilot		Reverse Dollop
248	6 Mar 2017	Animal Behavior Enterprises		Reverse Dollop
249	14 Mar 2017	Colorado Labor War		Live
250	16 Mar 2017	Phantom of the Open		Reverse Dollop
251	18 Mar 2017	The Morrisites		Live
252	24 Mar 2017	Icelandic History	Hugleikur Dagsson	Live
253	28 Mar 2017	James Oglethorpe and the Colony of Georgia		
254	30 Mar 2017	The Hobos of Iceland		
255	3 Apr 2017	Fake Navy Man Fred Demara		
256	10 Apr 2017	The Boston Police Strike		Live
257	14 Apr 2017	The Orange Catholic Riots	Felix Biederman, Will Menaker	Live
258	17 Apr 2017	Bill the Butcher and John Morrissey	Virgil Texas, Matt Christman	
259	21 Apr 2017	Edward Clarke vs Girls		
260	24 Apr 2017	The Welfare Queen		Live
261	27 Apr 2017	Henry Ford's Henchman	Matt Christman	Live
262	2 May 2017	Jack Johnson and The Great White Hope		Live
263	4 May 2017	The Texas Hypnocult	Kath Barbadoro	Live
264	8 May 2017	Selling the Chemical Reactor		Live
265	11 May 2017	Judge Roy Bean	Kath Barbadoro	Live
266	15 May 2017	Eugenics	Sarah Tiana	Live
267	18 May 2017	Assassin Arthur Bremer		Live
268	25 May 2017	Gunfighter Dallas Stoudenmire		
269	30 May 2017	New Orange		
270	1 Jun 2017	Forgotten Fleet Walker		
271	5 Jun 2017	Uber		
272	8 Jun 2017	The Bath Riots		
273	12 Jun 2017	The Magicians		
274	16 Jun 2017	The Naughty Civil War Boat		
275	19 Jun 2017	The Newsie Strike		
276	22 Jun 2017	Harriet Tubman		
277	26 Jun 2017	The Acadians		
278	30 Jun 2017	James Otis - The Almost Founding Father		
279	3 Jul 2017	Comanche Quanah Parker		
280	7 Jul 2017	Opium in the US - Part 1		
281	10 Jul 2017	Opium in the US - Part 2		
282	13 Jul 2017	Very Puritan Charles Chauncy		
283	17 Jul 2017	The Worst Supreme Court Justice Ever		Live
283 ½	19 Jul 2017	Levi Strauss	Ari Shaffir	Guest read
284	20 Jul 2017	Lincoln's Body		
285	28 Jul 2017	Bully Bob Waterman		
286	31 Jul 2017	Josiah Harlan		Live
287	8 Aug 2017	The Caning of Sumner		
288	15 Aug 2017	Ross Perot		
289	22 Aug 2017	The Confederados		
290	29 Aug 2017	Dr Henry Cotton		Live
291	6 Sep 2017	PT Barnum		Live
292	12 Sep 2017	Badass Lawyer Vincent Hallinan		
293	19 Sep 2017	Gaston Means		Live
294	26 Sep 2017	Blackbeard		Live
295	3 Oct 2017	Swamp People of Carolina		Live
296	10 Oct 2017	Griffith J. Griffith	Chris Tallman	Live
297	17 Oct 2017	Carl Tanzler		
298	24 Oct 2017	Lasseter's Reef		Live
299	2 Nov 2017	Errol Flynn	Wil Anderson	Live
301	7 Nov 2017	Te Pahi and The Boyd	David Ferrier, Guy Williams	Live
302	11 Nov 2017	Hume and Hovell	Wil Anderson	Live
300A	14 Nov 2017	Donald Trump (Part One)		
300B	14 Nov 2017	Donald Trump (Part Two)		
303	21 Nov 2017	The Crutchy Push		Live
304	28 Nov 2017	Sydney Razor Gangs		Live
305	5 Dec 2017	The Devil's Wire		
306	12 Dec 2017	Gay Life in the Tasmanian Colony	Justin Hamilton	Live
307	19 Dec 2017	Naked Joseph Knowles		
308	2 Jan 2018	The Victoria Gold Rush	Wil Anderson	Live
309	9 Jan 2018	Big John and Harvey's Casino		
310	16 Jan 2018	Levittown: The Whitest Suburb		
311	23 Jan 2018	Total Badass Larcena Pennington		
312	27 Jan 2018	Climax Jim		
313	30 Jan 2018	John Batman	Wil Anderson	Live
314	7 Feb 2018	The Baron of Arizona		Live
315	13 Feb 2018	The Witch of Kings Cross		
316	20 Feb 2018	Jørgen Jørgensen	Wil Anderson	Live
317	28 Feb 2018	The Butter Crime		Live
318	6 Mar 2018	Fighting Irish vs The Klan		Live
319	13 Mar 2018	The Missouri Mormon War		Live
320	20 Mar 2018	The Wobblies Go To Everett		
321	27 Mar 2018	Erik Prince and Blackwater		
322	3 Apr 2018	Hank Vaughn [sic]		Live
323	10 Apr 2018	1908 New York to Paris Car Race	James Adomian	Live
324	17 Apr 2018	Denis Kearney		Live
325	25 Apr 2018	Billy Sipple		Live
326	8 May 2018	Robert Smalls		
327	16 May 2018	James Callender		
328	22 May 2018	The Arizona Orphan Battle		
329	Removed.			
330	4 Jun 2018	Feinstein and The Flag		
331	12 Jun 2018	Charlie Suringo		
332	19 Jun 2018	The Divorce Colony	Horatio Sanz	Live
333	26 Jun 2018	Major Taylor		Live
334	3 Jul 2018	Andrew Jackson		
335	10 Jul 2018	Need a Hiroo		Reverse Dollop
336	17 Jul 2018	Women and Transportation	Pam Reynolds (Gareth's mother)	
337	25 Jul 2018	Bonfils, Tammen, and the Denver Post	Wil Anderson	Live
338	31 Jul 2018	Abolitionist Benjamin Lay		
339	11 Aug 2018	John Wesley Powell	Wil Anderson	Live
340	16 Aug 2018	Kentucky Caver Floyd Collins		
341	22 Aug 2018	Coal Creek War [sic]		Live
342	29 Aug 2018	The John Paul Getty's		Live
343	6 Sep 2018	Lord Gordon Gordon		Live
344	11 Sep 2018	Charles Dederich and Synanon		
345	18 Sep 2018	Danny Greene		Live
346	26 Sep 2018	Henry Clay Frick		Live
347A	3 Oct 2018	The Stonewall Riots		Live - Episode got delisted after complaints arose
347	10 Oct 2018	NY Policeman's Riot	Dave Hill	Live
348	19 Oct 2018	George Lazenby		Reverse Dollop
349	23 Oct 2018	Nauru	Gen Fricker	Live
350	29 Oct 2018	Wells Fargo		
351	6 Nov 2018	Ghosting in Victoria	Wil Anderson	Live
352	13 Nov 2018	John "The Maverick" McCain		
353	22 Nov 2018	Aboriginal Warrior Pemulwuy	Damien Power	Live
354	28 Nov 2018	The Hayes Tilden Election Nightmare		Live
355	4 Dec 2018	Detroit Criminal Sophie Lyons		Live
356	11 Dec 2018	The Resnicks: Water Monsters		
357	18 Dec 2018	The Piedras Negras Jail Break		
358	24 Dec 2018	George H. W. Bush	Pam Reynolds	
359	9 Jan 2019	Sam Houston and the Archive War		
360	15 Jan 2019	William Buckley	Dilruk Jayasinha	Live
361	22 Jan 2019	The Truck Nuts War		Live
362	29 Jan 2019	Moving Day		
363	5 Feb 2019	The Convent in Charlestown		Live
364	14 Feb 2019	Proctor and Satan	Karen Kilgariff	Live
365	20 Feb 2019	Early Colonist Thomas Morton		Live
366	26 Feb 2019	Pilot Hans Bertram	Becky Lucas	Live
367	5 Mar 2019	Alice Roosevelt		
368	12 Mar 2019	Operation Wetback		
369	19 Mar 2019	Ben Reitman		
370	26 Mar 2019	Aussie Explorer Ludwig Leichhardt	Wil Anderson	Live
371	2 Apr 2019	Jim Traficant and Crimetown USA		Live
372	9 Apr 2019	America's First Ghost		
373	16 Apr 2019	Gangster Monk Eastman		
374	23 Apr 2019	John Delorean [sic]		
375	30 Apr 2019	The Prince of Swindlers		
376	7 May 2019	Mince Pie in America		
377	14 May 2019	The Loomis Fargo Robbery		Live
378	22 May 2019	The Sydney Cove Shipwreck	Nick Cody	Live
379	29 May 2019	The Landlord's Game		
380	30 May 2019	The Beaver Drop		Smollop
381	4 Jun 2019	Harmen van den Bogeart		Live
382	11 Jun 2019	Colonel Harland Sanders		
383	18 Jun 2019	Frank Gardiner	Nick Cody	Live
384	25 Jun 2019	Rep. Matt Shea (aka Verum Bellator)		
385	2 Jul 2019	Racer Janet Guthrie		
386	9 Jul 2019	The War on Squirrels	Pam Reynolds	
387	17 Jul 2019	Lyndon LaRouche		
388	23 Jul 2019	The Deaf President Now Protest		
389	30 Jul 2019	Marm Mandelbaum	Akaash Singh	Live
390	6 Aug 2019	Rob Rhinehart and Soylent		
391	13 Aug 2019	The Nudists		
392	20 Aug 2019	Chris “The Falcon” Boyce		Live
393	28 Aug 2019	Thomas Midgley		
394	03 Sep 2019	The Poison Squad		
395	10 Sep 2019	Marie Dorian [sic]		
396	18 Sep 2019	The Donner Party		
397	24 Sep 2019	Idaho Governor Caleb Lyon		Live
398	01 Oct 2019	Abalonia		Live
399	08 Oct 2019	The Third Wave		
400	15 Oct 2019	Ronald Reagan Part I	Patton Oswalt	
400	21 Oct 2019	Ronald Reagan Part II	Patton Oswalt	
401	29 Oct 2019	The Bridges of Milwaukee		Live
402	4 Nov 2019	Frank Lloyd Wright		Live
403	13 Nov 2019	Princess Cecilia of Sweden		Live
404	19 Nov 2019	Jan Pieterszoon Coen		Live
405	28 Nov 2019	The Rabbit Situation	Rob Delaney	Live
406	5 Dec 2019	Tycho Brahe		Live
407	9 Dec 2019	The Egg War		
408	17 Dec 2019	Billy Hitler		
409	24 Dec 2019	Leonard Peltier		
410	31 Dec 2019	Adolphus Cooke		Live
411	7 Jan 2020	Witches of Finnmark		Live from Oslo, Norway
412	14 Jan 2020	Mother Jones		
413	22 Jan 2020	The Whale in Atlantic City		
414	27 Jan 2020	Dr. William Price		Live from Cardiff, Wales
415	3 Feb 2020	Voyage of the HMS Beagle		Live from London, UK
416	11 Feb 2020	Emmeline Pankhurst		Live from London, UK
417	18 Feb 2020	Eddy Haymour	Bobcat Goldthwait	Live from Vancouver, Canada
418	25 Feb 2020	Doug Evans and Juicero		Live from San Jose
419	2 Mar 2020	The Clarence Thomas Hearings		
420	11 Mar 2020	Holy City	Bert Kreischer	Live from Los Angeles
421	17 Mar 2020	Doc Ames	Bill Corbett	Live from Minneapolis
422	23 Mar 2020	George Jackson		Live
423	31 Mar 2020	West Virginia Textbook War		
424	6 Apr 2020	The Co-Op War		
425	14 Apr 2020	Hofman and the Salamander [sic]		Live from Salt Lake City
426	21 Apr 2020	John Randolph of Roanoake		
427	28 Apr 2020	Gouverneur Morris		
428	5 May 2020	The Anti-Masons		
429	11 May 2020	Joe Hill		Live from Salt Lake City
430	20 May 2020	Jordan Goudreau vs. Venezuela		
431	27 May 2020	Year of the Locust		
432	2 Jun 2020	John Mad Jack Mytton		Live from Birmingham
433	10 Jun 2020	Timothy Leary – Part 1		Reverse Dollop
434	15 Jun 2020	Timothy Leary – Part 2		Reverse Dollop
435	23 Jun 2020	The Coors Family		
436	30 Jun 2020	Sessue Hayakawa		
437	8 Jul 2020	Charles Lindbergh		
438	14 Jul 2020	John Brown – Part 1		
439	21 Jul 2020	John Brown – Part 2 – Bloody Kansas		
440	28 Jul 2020	John Brown – Part 3 – Harpers Ferry		
441	4 Aug 2020	The Promise Keepers		
442	12 Aug 2020	Raffaele Minichiello		
443	18 Aug 2020	George Hunter White		
444	25 Aug 2020	Earl Long		
445	2 Sep 2020	Billy Carter		
446	8 Sep 2020	Ada Blackjack		
447	15 Sep 2020	Cassie Chadwick		
448	23 Sep 2020	Napoleon Hill		
449	30 Sep 2020	Wallace Hume Carothers		
450	6 Oct 2020	The Cocaine Pirates		
451	14 Oct 2020	Abbie Hoffman - Part One		
452	20 Oct 2020	Abbie Hoffman - Part Two		
453	27 Oct 2020	Abbie Hoffman - Part Three		
454	3 Nov 2020	Albert Parsons		
455	11 Nov 2020	The Frog Man		
456	3 Nov 2020	Scott Walker		Reverse Dollop
457	24 Nov 2020	Charles Morse		
458	2 Dec 2020	Bloody Williamson		
459	8 Dec 2020	Sir Walter Raleigh		
460	15 Dec 2020	Rick Gellert's Venus II		
461	22 Dec 2020	Floyd Allen		
462	29 Dec 2020	Elizabeth Patterson Bonaparte		
463	5 Jan 2021	Lucy Parsons		
464	19 Jan 2021	The Gentleman's riots for slavery		
465	26 Jan 2021	Zoo Man Cy DeVry		
466	2 Feb 2021	Wicked Phenix City		
467	9 Feb 2021	The San Jose Bees		
468	16 Feb 2021	The Meat Riot		
469	23 Feb 2021	The Ringer		
470	2 Mar 2021	Frank Verdi		
471	9 Mar 2021	William Henry Ellis	Eduardo Espinosa, José Antonio Badía	
472	16 Mar 2021	The A-Team		
473	23 Mar 2021	Toothpicks in America		
474	30 Mar 2021	Cabeza De Vaca - Part 1		
475	06 Apr 2021	Cabeza De Vaca - Part 2		
476	13 Apr 2021	The Manure Pile		
477	20 Apr 2021	Otto Wood		
478	27 Apr 2021	Lois Jotter and Elzada Clover		
479	4 May 2021	Harry Decker		
480	11 May 2021	Pope Day in Boston		
481	18 May 2021	Women's Deodorant and Antiperspirant		
482	25 May 2021	Counterfeiter Owen Sullivan		
483	1 Jun 2021	George Pullman – Part 1		
484	8 Jun 2021	George Pullman – Part 2: The Strike		
485	15 Jun 2021	The Florida Judges		
486	22 Jun 2021	The Texas Prison Situation		
487	29 Jun 2021	Curtis Turner		
488	6 Jul 2021	Greensboro Klan vs. Commies		
489	13 Jul 2021	Trapper Nelson		
490	20 Jul 2021	Periwigs in America		
491	27 Jul 2021	Billy Martin – Part 1		
492	3 Aug 2021	Billy Martin – Part 2		
493	10 Aug 2021	Plennie Wingo		
494	17 Aug 2021	Billy Cottrell		
495	24 Aug 2021	Jedediah Smith		
496	31 Aug 2021	The Essex		
497	7 Sep 2021	Jeffrey Edward Fowle		
498	14 Sep 2021	Madame Dumont		
499	21 Sep 2021	Utah Governor John Dawson		Live
500	28 Sep 2021	Eugene Debs – Part 1	Karen Kilgariff	
501	5 Oct 2021	Eugene Debs – Part 2	Karen Kilgariff	
502	14 Oct 2021	Aimee Semple McPherson		Live
503	19 Oct 2021	Arizona Governor Evan Mecham – Part 1		
504	26 Oct 2021	Arizona Governor Evan Mecham – Part 2		
505	2 Nov 2021	The McLeans and the Hope Diamond	Luke Simmons	
506	9 Nov 2021	The de Youngs		Live
507	16 Nov 2021	Alice Stebbins Wells		
508	23 Nov 2021	Stephen Burroughs		
509	30 Nov 2021	Adah Isaacs Menken		
510	7 Dec 2021	John Sutter		Live
511	14 Dec 2021	Jessie Daniel Ames		
512	21 Dec 2021	William T. Sharon		Live
513	28 Dec 2021	Best of The Dollop		
514	4 Jan 2022	Colin Powell		
515	11 Jan 2022	René-Robert Cavelier de La Salle		
516	18 Jan 2022	Brooks Brothers		
517	25 Jan 2022	The Diseased Book Panic		
518	1 Feb 2022	Benjamin Beast Butler		
519	8 Feb 2022	Satchel Paige and Trujillo		
520	15 Feb 2022	Benedict Arnold - Part 1		
521	22 Feb 2022	Benedict Arnold - Part 2		
522	1 Mar 2022	Duke Cunningham		Live
523	1 Mar 2022	The Great Flood		
524	15 Mar 2022	Sam Patch		
525	22 Mar 2022	The House of David		
526	29 Mar 2022	Steven Seagal - Part 1		
527	5 Apr 2022	Steven Seagal - Part 2		
528	12 Apr 2022	Steven Seagal - Part 3 (the carrot)		
529	19 Apr 2022	The Taxicab War		
530	26 Apr 2022	1923 Police Riots	Wil Anderson	Live
531	3 May 2022	Taulbee and Kincaid		
532	10 May 2022	Gough Whitlam and 1975	Gen Fricker	Live
533	17 May 2022	NY Cop Johnny Broderick		
534	24 May 2022	Warren G Harding		Live
535	31 May 2022	John Stonehouse	Nick Cody	Live
536	7 Jun 2022	Captain Thunderbolt	Wil Anderson	Live
537	14 Jun 2022	Denny McLain		
538	21 Jun 2022	Peter Brock		Live
539	27 Jun 2022	Aaron Burr - Part 1		
540	5 Jul 2022	Aaron Burr - Part 2		
541	12 Jul 2022	Aaron Burr - Part 3		
542	19 Jul 2022	Aaron Burr - Part 4		
543	26 Jul 2022	William Wentworth	Wil Anderson, Justin Hamilton	Live
544	2 Aug 2022	Houdini vs Margery		Live
545	9 Aug 2022	The 1984 Olympic Games		
546	16 Aug 2022	The Greek Town Riot	Sam Morril	
547	23 Aug 2022	The Milwaukee Police Station Bombing		Live
548	30 Aug 2022	Governor Charles Martin		Live
549	9 Sep 2022	Baron Friedrich von Steuben		
550	13 Sep 2022	Eugene Talmadge		
551	20 Sep 2022	Sinatra in Australia	Becky Lucas	Live
552	27 Sep 2022	The Fort Dix Five		
553	4 Oct 2022	The Baseball World Tour		
554	11 Oct 2022	The Wild John of Wynoochee		
555	17 Oct 2022	The Poison Gang		Live
556	25 Oct 2022	Mayor William McNair	Bill Crawford	Live
557	1 Nov 2022	Augustus Woodward		Live
558	7 Nov 2022	The Ty Cobb Strike		
559	15 Nov 2022	"Doctor" Linda Hazzard		Live
560	22 Nov 2022	Rodney King and the LA Riots		
561	29 Nov 2022	Parker Harden French [sic]		Live
562	6 Dec 2022	Boston Prudes and Nudes		
563	13 Dec 2022	The King of Ghouls		Live
564	20 Dec 2022	Early Bad Boys of Harvard		
565	3 Jan 2023	Dean Kamen and It		
566	10 Jan 2023	Phyllis Schlafly		Live
567	17 Jan 2023	The First President's Slave: Ona Judge		
568	23 Jan 2023	Typhoid Mary		
569	31 Jan 2023	Mary Read and Anne Bonny		
570	7 Feb 2023	Senator Foraker vs Teddy Roosevelt		Live
571	21 Feb 2023	The Plague in SF		
572	28 Feb 2023	PG&E - Part 1		
573	6 Mar 2023	PG&E - Part 2		
574	14 Mar 2023	Rickey Henderson - Part 1		
575	20 Mar 2023	Rickey Henderson - Part 2		
576	28 Mar 2023	The Menominee Abby Takeover [sic]		Live
577	4 Apr 2023	How New Hampshire Came to Be		
578	11 Apr 2023	New York Pigs		
579	18 Apr 2023	John Dowie Alexander [sic]		Live
580	24 Apr 2023	The 1835 New York City Fire		
581	3 May 2023	Jerry Springer		
582	8 May 2023	The 1917 Minnesota Right Wing Coup		Live
583	15 May 2023	Chris von der Ahe - Part 1		
584	23 May 2023	Chris von der Ahe - Part 2		
585	29 May 2023	Televangelist Peter Popoff		
586	6 June 2023	President Franklin Pierce		
587	14 June 2023	Jonathan Bourne Jr.		
588	21 June 2023	Soapy Smith	Tom Cardy	
589	27 June 2023	Isabel, Frank, and von Phul		
590	11 Jul 2023	Sputnik Monroe		Reverse Dollop
591	18 Jul 2023	Richard Jewell		
592	25 Jul 2023	Albert Einstein - Part One		
593	1 Aug 2023	Albert Einstein - Part Two		
594	8 Aug 2023	Lizzie Tabor		Live
595	15 Aug 2023	Peter Skene Ogden		Live
596	22 Aug 2023	Slave Thomas H Jones		
597	29 Aug 2023	William A Clark		Live
598	5 Sep 2023	The New York Oysters - part one		
599	12 Sep 2023	The New York Oysters - part two		
600	19 Sep 2023	Elon Musk with Karen Kilgariff - part one	Karen Kilgariff	
601	26 Sep 2023	Elon Musk with Karen Kilgariff - part two	Karen Kilgariff	
602	3 Oct 2023	Leland Stanford		Live
603	10 Oct 2023	Mad Joseph McDowell		
604	17 Oct 2023	John Schrenk and Teddy Roosevelt		Live
605	24 Oct 2023	The Toledo War		
606	31 Oct 2023	Captain Ellen Jack		Live
607	7 Nov 2023	John Murray Spear and His Machine		
608	14 Nov 2023	Alfred Packer with Adam Cayton Holland		Live
609	21 Nov 2023	The Founding of San Quentin Prison		
610	28 Nov 2023	The Souper Anarchist		Live
611	5 Dec 2023	Operation Ajax - Part One		
612	12 Dec 2023	Operation Ajax - Part Two		
613	19 Dec 2023	SoulCycle		
614	2 Jan 2024	Coya Knutson		Live
615	9 Jan 2024	Pistol Pete Reiser		
616	Jan 16 2024	The Floppers		
617	Jan 23 2024	Lisa Frank		
618	Jan 30 2024	Rebel William Morgan		Live
619	Feb 5 2024	Anita Bryant - Part One		
620	Feb 13 2024	Anita Bryant - Part Two		
621	Feb 19 2024	Chris Rufo and Glendale Hank		
622	Feb 27 2024	John Hurty		Live
623	Mar 5 2024	Bill "Spaceman" Lee		
624	Mar 12 2024	The Pinkerton Agency - Part One		
625	Mar 19 2024	The Pinkerton Agency - Part Two		
626	Mar 26 2024	John Deitz and His Dam		Live
627	Apr 2 2024	Rivera y Anza		
628	Apr 9 2024	Katherine Tingley and Theosophy	Pam Reynolds	Live
629	Apr 16 2024	Seaman Daniel Collins		
630	Apr 23 2024	Ganna Walska		
631	Apr 30 2024	Dick Fellows		
632	May 7, 2024	The Blackburn Cult		
633	May 14, 2024	Rupert Murdoch - Part One		
634	May 21, 2024	Rupert Murdoch - Part Two		
635	May 28, 2024	Francis Birtles with Wil Anderson and Ben Russell - Live	Wil Anderson, Ben Russell	Live
636	Jun 4 2024	The Cherry Sisters		
637	11 Jun 2024	Curt Flood		
638	18 Jun 2024	The Billington's		
639	25 Jun 2024	Charles Poston		Live
640	2 Jul 2024	Anne Hutchinson		
641	9 Jul 2024	Black Caesar	Tom Cardy	Live
642	16 Jul 2024	The Carlin Party		
643	23 Jul 2024	Mike Fink		
644	30 Jul 2024	Bernarr Macfadden		
645	6 Aug 2024	The Bondi Bikini	Wil Anderson	Live
646	13 Aug 2024	Speenhamland and Nixon		
647	20 Aug 2024	Rocky of Benihana		
648	27 Aug 2024	Isabella Bird		
649	3 Sept 2024	The Mickelberg Affair	Xavier Michelides	Live
650	10 Sept 2024	James Donald Vance - Part 1		
651	17 Sept 2024	James Donald Vance - Part 2		
652	24 Sept 2024	Davy Crockett		
653	2 Oct 2024	Samuel Colt		
654	8 Oct 2024	The Pieman	Wil Anderson, Justin Hamilton	Live
655	15 Oct 2024	Harry R Truman		
656	22 Oct 2024	Nellie Bly - Part One		
657	29 Oct 2024	Nellie Bly - Part Two		
658	5 Nov 2024	Chavez Ravine		
659	12 Nov 2024	The Love Raft		
660	19 Nov 2024	President Benjamin Franklin - Part One		
661	2 Dec 2024	President Benjamin Franklin - Part Two		
662	10 Dec 2024	President Benjamin Franklin - Part 3		
663	17 Dec 2024	Chicago's Best Cop		
664	31 Dec 2024	The Horse Flu		
665	7 Jan 2025	Beanie Baby Madness		Reverse Dollop
666	14 Jan 2025	The Resnicks - Water Monsters		
667	22 Jan 2025	Edgar Allen Poe - Part 1		
668	28 Jan 2025	Edgar Allen Poe - Part 2		
669	5 Feb 2025	American Dragons		
670	12 Feb 2025	Pete Browning		
671	18 Feb 2025	H.L. Hunt - Part 1		
672	25 Feb 2025	H.L. Hunt - Part 2		
673	4 Mar 2025	H.L. Hunt - Part 3		
674	12 Mar 2025	Jim Caviezel		10th anniversary special
675	18 Mar 2025	South Fork Fishing & Hunting Club - Part 1		
676	25 Mar 2025	South Fork Fishing & Hunting Club - Part 2		
677	2 Apr 2025	Clay Allison		
678	9 Apr 2025	Douglas Stringfellow		
679	16 Apr 2025	Don the talking Dog		
680	22 Apr 2025	Alvin Kelly		
681	30 Apr 2025	The Abernathy Boys		
682	7 May 2025	Pete Rose - Part 1		
683	14 May 2025	Pete Rose - Part 2		
684	20 May 2025	Pete Rose - Part 3		
685	27 May 2025	John Walton		
686	3 Jun 2025	Felix The Cat		
687	11 Jun 2025	Larry Sullivan		
688	17 Jun 2025	Pinball		
689	25 Jun 2025	Larry Craig		
690	1 Jul 2025	The Baseball Fight		
691	8 Jul 2025	Jimmy Swaggart - Part 1		
692	16 Jul 2025	Jimmy Swaggart - Part 2		
693	23 Jul 2025	Juan Cortina		
694	30 Jul 2025	John Considine		Live
695	6 Aug2025	Albert Ryo Okura		
696	13 Aug 2025	Bo Gritz -Part 1		
697	20 Aug 2025	Bo Gritz - Part 2		
698	27 Aug 2025	Bo Gritz - Part 3		
699	3 Sept 2025	Jack London	Nato Green	Live
700	9 Sep 2025	Bill Clinton Part 1	James Adomian	Was Live Broadcast on Patreon in full length on September 3 2025
701	16 Sep 2025	Bill Clinton Part 2	James Adomian	
702	23 Sep 2025	Bill Clinton Part 3	James Adomian	
703	30 Sep 2025	William Penn Patrick		
704	7 Oct 2025	Lady Franklin Bay Expedition		
705	14 Oct 2025	Bisbee Deportation		Live
706	21 Oct 2025	Mike Lindell Part 1		
707	28 Oct 2025	Mike Lindell Part 2		
708	4 Nov 2025	Joh Bjelke-Petersen		Live in Australia
709	11 Nov 2025	Butter vs Margarine		Live in Milwaukee
710	18 Nov 2025	Johnny Appleseed		Live in Columbus
711	2 Dec 2025	Baseball Mascots		
712	9 Dec 2025	Henry Hudson Part I		
713	16 Dec 2025	Henry Hudson Part II		
714	30 Dec 2025	The Milk Strike		Live in Wisconsin
715	5 Jan 2026	Brigham Young Part I		
716	13 Jan 2026	Brigham Young Part II		
717	20 Jan 2025	Brigham Young Part III		
718	27 Jan 2026	Brigham Young Part IV		
719	3 Feb 2026	Colonel Walker		Live in Austin
720	10 Feb 2026	Charlie Sweeney		
721	17 Feb 2026	Ted Nugent		
722	24 Feb 2026	Oregon's Unwritten Law		Live in Oregon
723	3 Mar 2026	Garrett Trapnell Part I		
724	10 Mar 2026	Garrett Trapnell Part II		
725	17 Mar 2026	The Possum Open Mic	with Mike Bridenstine	Mike tells Gareth and Dave a story from his book Kansas City Comedy, neither of whom know Mike's topic in advance.
726	24 Mar 2026	Gavin Arthur		Live in Denver
727	31 Mar 2026	Billy McGlory		Van Edition
728	7 Apr 2026	Streetcar Strike		Live
729	14 Apr 2026	Peter Lemongello		
730	21 Apr 2026	O'Connor Layover Agreement		
731	28 Apr 2026	Vern Miller		Live in Kansas City
732	5 May 2026	William Seabrook		
733	12 May 2026	Ragen's Colts		
734	19 May 2026	The Pelican Girls		
735	26 May 2026	Amasa Stone		
736	2 Jun 2026	Silas Soule - Part 1		
737	9 Jun 2026	Silas Soule - Part 2		
738	16 Jun 2026	Silas Soule - Part 3		
739	23 Jun 2026	Ferdinand Ward		Live in Buffalo
740	30 Jun 2026	Alexander Hamilton - Part 1		
741	7 July 2026	Alexander Hamilton - Part 2		
742	14 July 2026	Alexander Hamilton - Part 3		
743	21 July 2026	Alexander Hamilton - Part 4		
744	28 July 2026	Oneida Cult		
745	4 Aug 2026	Zoot Suit Riots - Part 1		
746	11 Aug 2026	Zoot Suit Riots - Part 2		
747	18 Aug 2026	Zoot Suit Riots - Part 3		
748	25 Aug 2026	Jimmy Haggerty		
749	1 Sep 2026	Staten Island & The Revolutionary War		With Ben Naddaff Hafrey from Revisionist History
750	7 Sept 2026	Mary Dyer		Live in Boston
751	15 Sept 2026	Brett Favre - Part 1		
752	22 Sept 2026	Brett Favre - Part 2		
753	29 Sept 2026	Brett Favre - Part 3		
754	6 Oct 2026	Marion Barry		Live from DC
755	13 Oct 2026	Karen Bass - Part 1		
756	20 Oct 2026	Karen Bass - Part 2		

== See also ==
- List of history podcasts
