= Jared Freid =

American comedian

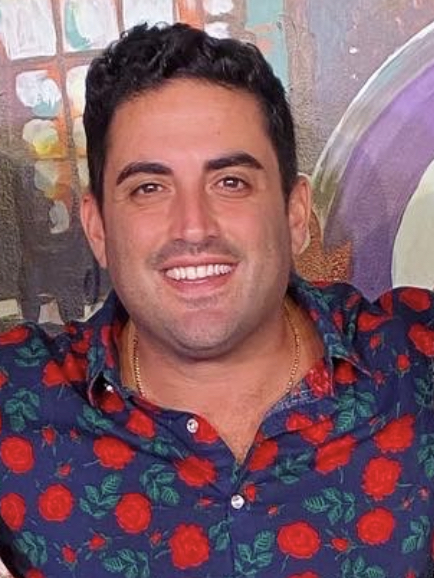
- Freid in 2023
- Born: Needham, Massachusetts, U.S.
- Education: Pennsylvania State University (BEc)
- Occupations: comedian; television host; writer; podcaster
- Website: jaredfreid.com

Jared Freid is an American comedian, podcaster, writer, and television host. He was the host of the 2018 NBC game show How Low Will You Go: Snapchat, which aired on the social media platform Snapchat. He has performed stand-up comedy at Just for Laughs, Zanies Comedy Club, Gotham Comedy Club and the Gramercy Theatre and has been featured on The Today Show, NFL Full Contact, Failosophy, NFL Top 10, and The Tonight Show Starring Jimmy Fallon. Freid wrote comedy and columns for multiple media companies including Betches, Total Frat Move, and Bro Bible and runs his own podcast series called JTrain Podcast. In August 2023, Freid released a Netflix comedy special, Jared Freid: 37 & Single. In September 2026, Fried released his second Netflix comedy special, produced by Betches: the Family Plan.

== Early life and education ==
Freid grew up in Needham, Massachusetts, a suburban town near Boston. He is Jewish and attended Hebrew school and Jewish summer camps in his youth. Freid's father, originally from Newton, is from a relatively non-observant Jewish family. His mother is from a religious Jewish family that keeps Kosher. Freid's maternal grandfather was the president of his synagogue.

Freid attended Needham High School. He graduated from Pennsylvania State University in 2007 with a degree in economics.

== Career ==
Freid moved to New York City and has performed comedy at The Stand NYC and Comix at Mohegan Sun. A stand-up comedian, he has performed comedy shows throughout the United States.

In 2017, Freid performed in the New Faces Showcase at the 35th Annual Just for Laughs Festival in Montréal.

Freid was the host of the 2018 NBC and Snapchat game show How Low Will You Go: Snapchat. He was also on MTV2's show Vidiots. He has also been featured on TruTV's NFL Full Contact, MTV's Failosophy, NBC's The Today Show, the NFL Network's NFL Top 10, The Tonight Show Starring Jimmy Fallon, and AXS TV's Gotham Comedy Live.

Freid hosts a podcast, JTrain Podcast, and tours live podcast episodes around the United States. His podcast has over 450,000 monthly subscribers and has been listed in the iTunes Top 100. Freid also co-hosts a modern dating podcast called U Up? with Jordana Abraham of Betches and was featured on the podcast Bachelor Party.

Freid has written columns for Total Frat Move, BroBible, Betches, LuvThis, and HeTexted.

On August 15, 2023, Freid released his stand-up comedy Netflix special Jared Freid: 37 & Single. The special was filmed at the Gramercy Theatre in New York City.

Freid made a guest appearance on the October 1, 2025 episode of Mel Owen's season of The Golden Bachelor. He made an appearance in the 2025 romantic comedy film 31 Candles.

In September 2026, Fried released his second Netflix comedy special, produced by Betches: the Family Plan.
