= Betches =

Digital media company

- Website type: Lifestyle
- Available in: English
- Creators: Jordana Abraham; Samantha Sage; Aleen Dreksler
- Website: betches.com
- Launched: February 2011

Betches (originally Betches Love This) is a digital media company started by Aleen Dreksler, Jordana Abraham, and Sami Sage. Originally a website, the company now includes a website, social media accounts, several podcasts, a national comedy tour, merchandise, and three best-selling books.

== History ==
The Betches Love This website began in February 2011 and was authored by Aleen Kuperman, Jordana Abraham, and Samantha Fishbein. Each of the three women invested $1,500 into the company. They chose the name "Betches Love This" because they heard young women saying the word when they did not want to be called a bitch. Betches Love This was shortened to "Betches" as the brand developed into a larger humor category discussing topics such as celebrities, health and fitness, politics, and TV and movie recaps. The Betches put forth multiple social media posts a week for their fans. The three women claim to "say what people are thinking about the world, but no one's spoken out loud".

Betches has been called the female counterpart to the bro fraternity culture by The New York Times. The three co-creators have been labeled as authors, entrepreneurs and humorists by Dan Rather. The three women behind Betches have stated that they support a mantra of "not taking yourself too seriously and being confident in who you are." A 2015 Vogue article discussed the impact a Betches advertisement has on a product or service, as their following is "obsessive" and their page has been named as one of the top accounts to follow by Harper's Bazaar and Rolling Stone.

In 2011, while seniors at Cornell University, Jordana Abraham, Samantha Fishbein, and Aleen Kuperman created Betches in the form of a WordPress blog. They targeted women that were "'edgy, speak their minds, and unapologetic in regards to their beliefs and opinions'" The blog was first designed to counteract the male humor that was receiving a high level of attention from young men. The humor of the three women was targeted towards the "anti-alphamale", while also making jokes towards the "nice girl" via their discussions on celebrities, fashion, and relationship advice. Currently, Betches post on beauty, lifestyle, career, horoscope, and many others.

== Education ==
The three women grew up in a New York suburb. The women attended Roslyn High School in Long Island. The three women graduated from Cornell University, where they roomed together their senior year.

== Business ==
Abraham, Fishbein, and Kuperman all lacked backgrounds in business, but each had family connections to those who specialized in law or business to help their company flourish. After graduation, all three women lived at their parents' house, allowing them to meet with each other and work on their platform. They focused on their Instagram, rather than their website, after hiring an ad buyer who said that their readers were more interested in it.

A website named Digital America states that "Betches are proud to be the girls that everyone hates because they view it as a reflection of their superiority" and that Betches strive to dominate the social structures set forth today through their use of beauty, wealth, popularity, and their lack of compassion for others.

The women partnered with smaller jewelry and fashion companies to get their name out, but these attempts did not lead to the results the women strived for. Bumble purchased a package of Instagram advertisements and sponsored the Betches' second book's launch party. Most recently, Betches partnered with e-commerce site JustFab to launch a subscription-based clothing line.

Forbes has estimated that in 2017, their 3rd year of earning profit, the women behind Betches earned more than $5 million in revenue, 75% of which came from brand partnerships. The women own the company fully, as they have not sought out investors.

== Books ==
Nice Is Just a Place in France: How to Win at Basically Everything
- Author: Betches
- Published: 2013 (Gallery Books)
- Publisher: Gallery Books
- ISBN: 9781451687767

The Betches have published two New York Times Best Selling books. The books are categorized as "satire self help".

Nice Is Just a Place in France: How to Win at Basically Everything

This was the first book published by the Betches. The book provides readers with information regarding all aspects of life and focuses a lot on friend groups.

I Had a Nice Time And Other Lies...: How to Find Love & Sh*t Like That
- Author: Betches
- Published: 2016 (Gallery Books)
- Publisher: Gallery Books
- ISBN: 9781501151101

I Had a Nice Time And Other Lies...: How to Find Love & Sh*t Like That

This was the second book published by the Betches, which focusses on dating and relationship advice.

When's Happy Hour?: Work Hard So You Can Hardly Work

This was the third book published by the Betches. The book consists of advice for readers with their professional life, so they can "basically be the Beyonce of anything [they] aspire to do."

== Podcasts ==
Betches Brides This podcast explores all facets of the complex interpersonal struggles that stem from the wedding planning process. It was formerly hosted by Nicole Pellegrino.

Betches Sup This is a political & pop culture comedy podcast.

Diet Starts Tomorrow This podcast explored the psychological and emotional side of health and wellbeing. It was originally hosted by Betches co-founders Aleen Dreksler and Sami Sage.

U Up? This podcast focuses on modern dating woes and is co-hosted by Jordana Abraham and Jared Freid.

== Criticism ==
The women behind the Betches have faced backlash about statements the authors have made, which promote taking Adderall to stay focused and having anorexia to stay thin.

In April 2012, Abraham wrote a post titled "How To: Get People To Accuse You of Having an Eating Disorder" in which she gave advice to not eat food when with a group. The post has since been removed. The Betches received hundreds of comments in regard to the post. One reader came forward, saying that her friend had not eaten in two weeks since reading the post. Despite reader backlash, the Betches have still discussed anorexia on their platforms, having stated that they "can’t feel responsible for every girl who feels like she needs to be 90 pounds because we made a joke".
