= Damn Interesting =

Website publishing articles on science and history

- Available in: English
- Owner: Alan Bellows
- Website: www.damninteresting.com
- Commercial: No
- Launched: September 2005; 21 years ago
- Current status: active

Damn Interesting is an independent website founded by Alan Bellows in 2005. The website presents true stories from science, history, and psychology, primarily as long-form articles, often illustrated with original artwork. Works are written by various authors, and published at irregular intervals. The website rejects advertising, relying on reader and listener donations to cover operating costs.

As of October 2012, each article is also published as a podcast under the same name. In November 2019, a second podcast was launched under the title Damn Interesting Week, featuring unscripted commentary on an assortment of news articles featured on the website's "Curated Links" section that week. In mid-2020, a third podcast called Damn Interesting Curio Cabinet began highlighting the website's periodic short-form articles in the same radioplay format as the original podcast.

In July 2009, Damn Interesting published the print book Alien Hand Syndrome through Workman Publishing. It contains some favorites from the site and some exclusive content.

On July 9, 2015, Bellows posted an open letter accusing The Dollop, a comedy podcast about history, of plagiarism due to their repeated use of verbatim text from Damn Interesting articles without permission or attribution. Dave Anthony, the writer of The Dollop, responded on Reddit, admitting to using Damn Interesting content, but saying that the use was protected by fair use, and claiming that "historical facts are not copyrightable."

== Awards and recognition ==
- In August 2007, PC Magazine named Damn Interesting one of the "Top 100 Undiscovered Web Sites".
- The article "The Zero-Armed Bandit" by Alan Bellows won a 2015 Sidney Award from David Brooks in The New York Times.
- The article "Ghoulish Acts and Dastardly Deeds" by Alan Bellows was cited as "nonfiction journalism from 2017 that will stand the test of time" by Conor Friedersdorf in The Atlantic.
- The article "Dupes and Duplicity" by Jennifer Lee Noonan won a 2020 Sidney Award from David Brooks in the New York Times.
