= Above Average Productions =

Online comedy distributor and multi-channel network

- Industry: Internet, television
- Genre: Comedy
- Founded: June 4, 2012; 14 years ago
- Headquarters: New York City
- Key people: Marc Lieberman (President)
- Parent: Broadway Video
- Website: http://aboveaverage.com

Above Average Productions is an online comedy distributor and multi-channel network owned by Broadway Video. As of February 1, 2016, the network has over 8.6 million subscribers and 2.4 billion views on YouTube.

== History and Formation ==
=== Above Average ===
Above Average Productions is the digital sector of Lorne Michaels' production company, Broadway Video. Michaels previously formed Above Average Productions during the late 1970s, when a series of specials were developed under a production company of the same name. However, the online comedy network that it is known as today was not founded until 2012.

In June 2012, Above Average Productions quietly launched after Broadway Video decided to help produce a Web series that Saturday Night Live writer Mike O'Brien had come up with. The series was called 7 Minutes in Heaven and featured Mike O'Brien interviewing celebrities such as Patricia Arquette and Ellen DeGeneres, among others, in a small closet. After production on the series commenced, other members of the Broadway Video family expressed their desire to contribute to the online comedy community. This eagerness from within the company, along with the popularity of the 7 Minutes in Heaven, prompted Broadway Video to make the decision to officially revive the Above Average brand and form the "boutique multichannel network" that Above Average is today. The current president of Above Average is Jennifer Danielson.

In 2018, Above Average Productions and NBC created a show for Snapchat called How Low Will You Go.

Above Average Productions is based out of New York City.

=== The Kicker ===
In October 2015, Above Average partnered with SNL co-head writer Bryan Tucker to launch a new sports comedy brand, The Kicker. The Kicker creates original sports comedy videos, articles, images, and digital content similar in tone to Above Average.

== Content ==
Above Average Productions creates comedy shorts for mostly online audiences. The style of comedy is typically highbrow and satirical; goofier, lowbrow content is also released occasionally. Above Average gives up-and-coming comedians an opportunity to show off their talents, grow as performers, and expand their professional network. Comedians such as Broad City's Ilana Glazer and SNL's Sasheer Zamata were both featured on Above Average before moving on to larger scale television projects. Above Average also collaborates within its many channels, and with other branches of Broadway Video, whether it be through sharing actors, writers, or directors.

Above Average has also ventured into media other than YouTube, such as Hulu, Yahoo and other international distributors, although YouTube continues to be the production company's main marketing tool. Above Average has also ventured offline in the past, creating an animated pilot for Comedy Central entitled Waco Valley, based on the network's popular web series about a dinosaur reporter, although the focus of the group remains on creating quality web content. Above Average has also done advertising work in the past for companies such as Lexus, Oreos, and Mastercard,

Some of Above Average's channel partners include The Lonely Island, Jay Pharoah, Mike O'Brien of 7 Minutes in Heaven, POYKPAC, Melissa Hunter (creator of Adult Wednesday Addams), Dave and Ethan, and Harvard Sailing Team, among others.

Above Average is home to 77 original series, such as 7 Minutes in Heaven, Alec Baldwin's Love Ride, Cool Kids' Table, Forgotten Assholes of History, Hudson Valley Ballers, I Wanna Have Your Baby, Is This Okay?, Paulilu Mixtape, Sound Advice, The Idiot's Guide to Smart People, Thingstarter, and Waco Valley.

While originally airing as web content, these smaller segments have been compiled into 22-minute episodes. Six seasons were produced, each with 15 episodes.
