= Failosophy =

- Genre: Comedy; Improv
- Starring: Hasan Minhaj
- Country of origin: United States
- No. of seasons: 1
- No. of episodes: 12

Production
- Executive producers: Brent Haynes; Catherine K. Whyte; Evan Mann; Gareth Reynolds; Jim Biederman; Kara Welker; Nick Predescu
- Running time: 20 to 23 minutes (excluding commercials)

Original release
- Network: MTV
- Release: February 14 – April 25, 2013

Failosophy is an American comedy television series on MTV. The series ran from February 14 to April 25, 2013.

== Premise ==
Hosted by comedian Hasan Minhaj, along with a panel of comedians and internet personalities, the series discusses humorous content found on the internet through social networking websites and other online fails. Each episode also has an audience-submitted recreation of an embarrassing incident they experienced themselves.

== Episodes ==
Season	Episodes	Originally released	
Season	Episodes	First released	Last released
1	12	February 14, 2013	April 25, 2013

=== Season 1 (2013) ===
No.	Guests	Original release date	U.S. viewers (millions)
1	Nicole Byer, Mike Cannon and Jared Freid	February 14, 2013	1.08
2	Jordan Carlos, Sabrina Jalees and Andrew Schulz	February 21, 2013	0.70
3	Nikki Glaser, Kevin Barnett and Jessimae Peluso	February 28, 2013	0.82
4	Jamie Lee, Damien Lemon and Gareth Reynolds	March 7, 2013	0.95
5	Chris Distefano, Gabe Liedman and Sara Schaefer	March 14, 2013	0.80
6	Jordan Carlos, Sabrina Jalees and Andrew Schulz	March 21, 2013	0.93
7	Mike Cannon, Pete Davidson, and Joselyn Hughes	March 28, 2013	0.92
8	Jamie Lee, Gabe Liedman and Gareth Reynolds	April 4, 2013	0.77
9	Nicole Byer, Kevin Barnett and Jared Freid	April 11, 2013	0.89
10	Nikki Glaser, Kevin Barnett and Jessimae Peluso	April 18, 2013	1.07
11	Charlemagne, Chris Distefano and Sara Schaefer	April 25, 2013	0.60
12	Chris Distefano, Lucas Molandes and Brooke Van Poppelen	April 25, 2013	N/A

== See also ==
- @midnight, Comedy Central TV game quiz show featuring a panel of competing comedians
