= How Low Will You Go: Snapchat =

2018 television series

NBC's How Low Will You Go: Snapchat,” is a 2018 television series that consist of two players being challenge to do a dare for money and whoever do it for less money wins the game.

== Background ==
This is an NBC game-show produced by production company Above Average and airs on Snapchat. The series was created and written by Jon Perry.

== Format ==
Every episode is hosted by Jared Freid who challenges two contestants to one crazy dare for money, and whoever can do the dare for less money wins the game.

== Cast ==
=== Main ===
- Jared Freid as Himself (Host)

=== Guest stars ===
- Jenna Bush Hager as Herself
- Willie Geist as Himself
