= Optic gland =

Endocrine glands found in the octopus and squid

The optic glands are endocrine organs in the octopus and squid that play a role in sexual development and senescence. They lie between the brain and optic lobes. The optic gland in female octopuses is associated with their maternal behavior of guarding their eggs without feeding. This self-starvation results in the death of the female octopus before her eggs have hatched. In captivity, some starving females also self-mutilate and entangle their arms in an apparent effort to die even faster.

== Removal ==
Removal of the gland causes the octopus to abandon their eggs and return to feeding. The female octopus then eats further, doubles its weight and doubles its lifespan.
