= Gareth Reynolds =

British-American comedian and podcaster

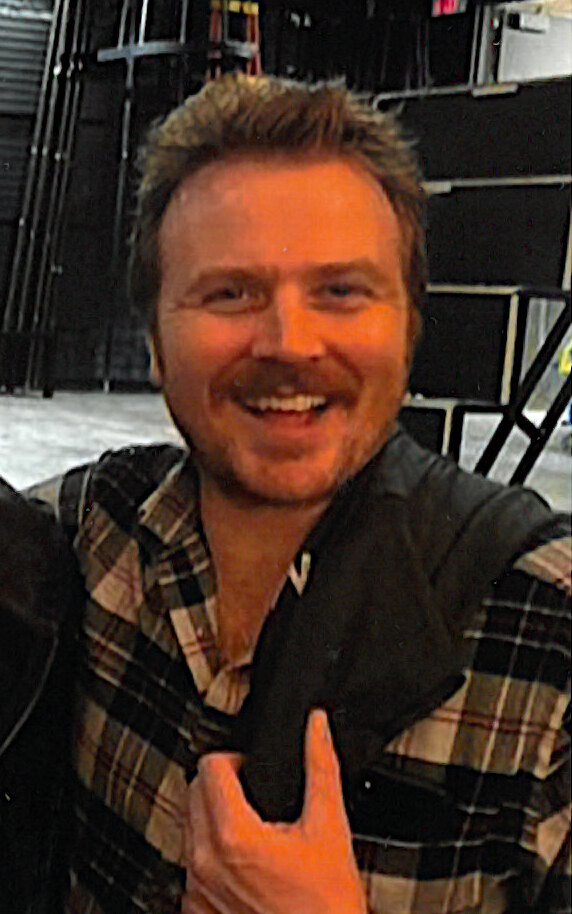
- Reynolds in March 2020
- Born: November 27, 1979 (age 46); Brown Deer, Wisconsin, U.S.
- Occupations: Comedian; podcaster; producer; writer
- Years active: 1997–present
- Website: garethreynolds.com

Gareth Patrick Reynolds (born November 27, 1979) is an American comedian, podcaster, producer, and writer. He is best known for co-hosting The Dollop, a weekly comedy history podcast in which his friend and fellow comedian Dave Anthony surprises him each time with a shocking or notable story from American history that he hears for the first time during the recording.

== Early life ==
Gareth Patrick Reynolds was born in Brown Deer, Wisconsin, on November 27, 1979, the son of English immigrants from Birmingham. He has an older brother. He holds dual British and American citizenship. His mother, Pam, has since moved back to England. As a teenager, Reynolds worked at Comedy Sportz in Milwaukee. He attended Emerson College in Boston, where he joined the improv group Swollen Monkeys. Another group member, Evan Mann, has since been his writing partner for over 20 years. Upon graduating in 2003, he moved to Los Angeles to continue his comedy career.

== Career ==
=== Podcasting ===
Reynolds currently co-hosts the podcasts The Dollop, a weekly comedy history podcast in which Dave Anthony tells him a shocking or notable story from American history of which he has no knowledge; The Past Times, a weekly comedy history podcast in which Anthony reads him and a new weekly guest the main stories of a newspaper from a particular day in history; and We're Here to Help, a bi-weekly comedy advice podcast with Jake Johnson.

Gareth was co-hosting The Naughty Show with Sam Tripoli when Anthony appeared on the show as a guest, with the pair's comedic chemistry prompting Anthony to invite Reynolds to occasionally fill in for Greg Behrendt on the Walking the Room podcast. In 2014, Reynolds was slated to be the first guest on Anthony's history podcast The Dollop, which was originally supposed to feature a new guest each episode; Reynolds ended up being the show's permanent co-host. On the show, Anthony tells Reynolds a story from American history of which Reynolds has no knowledge. He serves as an audience surrogate, reacting to the story and using his improv skills to add levity to the stories, some of which delve into the darkest periods of American history. As a running joke on the show, Anthony often shortens Reynolds' first name from "Gareth" to "Gary" and has encouraged audiences to chant "Gary" during live shows to annoy him. The pair started The Past Times in 2022, which involves Anthony reading stories from a historical newspaper to Reynolds and a new guest each week.

In 2023, Reynolds convinced his long-time friend Jake Johnson to co-host a comedy advice podcast with him. The pair, and sometimes a guest, speak to callers and offer "free advice that feels free". Similar to the "Gary" running joke on The Dollop, Johnson often calls Reynolds his childhood nickname "Garfie" to annoy him.

In 2025, Reynolds launched a third Podcast called Next We Have. It's a segment based comedy podcast with three new premises every episode.

From 2014 to 2021, Reynolds co-hosted Point vs. Point with Evan Mann.

=== Stand-up comedy ===
Reynolds first tried stand-up comedy when he moved to New York City to work on a TV show, and has since performed across the United States, Australia, and Europe. In 2019, he released his debut comedy album Riddled with Disease, which went to No. 1 on the Billboard charts the week it was released. His comedy special England, Weed, & The Rest premiered on YouTube in 2022.

=== Television and film ===
Shortly after graduating in 2003 Reynolds acted in the made for TV short film Breaking the Mold: The Kee Malesky Story. Reynolds was a writer and producer for Arrested Development, Hoops, and You're the Worst. He has acted in Hoops, Maron, A Very Harold & Kumar Christmas, and as Brian the security guard in an episode of New Girl. One of his first professional roles was on the hidden camera prank series The Real Wedding Crashers. With his writing partner Evan Mann, he starred on the Travel Channel show Mancations, and the pair also developed and produced MTV's Failosophy.

Reynolds wrote and stars in Give It Up, a darkly comedic mockumentary about delusion, desperation, and the cost of chasing relevance. The movie debuted in March 2026 at the Cinequest film festival in San Jose, CA.

=== Other ===
Reynolds has performed sketch comedy with Evan Mann, and the two have a YouTube channel.

In 2017, Reynolds co-wrote a book based on The Dollop podcast with Dave Anthony entitled The United States of Absurdity: Untold Stories from American History. Screenwriter Josh Olson described the book as "a great bathroom read".

During the COVID-19 pandemic, Reynolds began featuring his mother Pam on the YouTube comedy series Pamdemic. He also hosted a weekly show from his bedroom called Ga'riffs, where he riffed on topics submitted by viewers.

== Personal life ==
Reynolds lives in Los Angeles with his cat, José, who is often featured or mentioned on his podcasts and has his own Instagram account. He is a fan of the Green Bay Packers and has a Packers tattoo on his right arm, as well as tattoos of José and a dog named Bug on his left arm.

== Filmography ==
Year	Title	Role	Notes
2013	Failosophy	—N/a	Executive producer
2013	Stevie TV	—N/a	Writer (6 episodes)
2014	Riot	—N/a	Writer (5 episodes)
2016–2017	Idiotsitter	—N/a	Executive story editor Writer (2 episodes)
2017	Flaked	—N/a	Writer (Episode: "Day Five")
2018–2019	Arrested Development	—N/a	Co-executive producer Writer (2 episodes)
2019	You're the Worst	—N/a	Supervising producer Writer (2 episodes)
2023	Royal Crackers	Lars (voice)	Episode: "Stebe"
2023	Royal Crackers	Clark (voice)	Episode: "The 1%"
