= Octopus wrestling =

Sport with divers catching octopuses barehanded

Three divers holding the largest catch of the 1963 World Octopus Wrestling Championships, a 57-pound giant Pacific octopus.

Octopus wrestling involves a diver grappling with a large octopus in shallow water and dragging it to the surface.

Although it was called "wrestling", it was not wrestling per se, as most octopuses are rather skittish and not aggressive at all unless they are provoked, with most cases of provocation ending with the octopus fleeing. The contestants were usually only searching in holes along rocks in the ocean to grab the head of an octopus. Once a diver caught an octopus he continued to pull until the animal gave up.

== History ==
An early article on octopus wrestling appeared in a 1949 issue of Mechanix Illustrated.

A report from the Toledo Blade said that in 1957, 200 people gathered to watch an octopus wrestling event in the Puget Sound near Tacoma, Washington. A team from Portland, Oregon, won the contest by catching an eighty-pound octopus.

Octopus wrestling reached the height of its popularity on the West Coast of the United States during the 1960s. At that time, annual World Octopus Wrestling Championships were held in Puget Sound, Washington. The event was televised and attracted up to 5,000 spectators. Trophies were awarded to the individual divers and teams who caught the largest animals. Afterwards, the octopuses were either eaten, given to the local aquarium, or returned to the sea.

In April 1963, 111 divers took part in the World Octopus Wrestling Championships. A total of 25 giant Pacific octopuses (Enteroctopus dofleini) were captured that day, ranging in weight from 4 to 57 pounds (1.8 to 25.9 kg). Due to a deal to televise the championships and as not sufficient octopuses could be found at the beach, the organizers placed several octopuses which they had caught in advance of the contest along the beach to promise action and ensure a successful contest.

H. Allen Smith wrote an article for True magazine in 1964, collected in Low Man Rides Again (1973), about a man named O'Rourke whom he dubs the "Father of Octopus Wrestling". According to information Smith collected from Idwal Jones and other sources, O'Rourke and a partner developed a business in the late 1940s of fishing for octopuses, with O'Rourke serving as live bait, and his partner hauling him out of the water after an octopus was sufficiently wrapped around him.

All this while O'Rourke was becoming perhaps the world's greatest authority on the thought processes and the personality of the octopus. He knew how to outmaneuver them, to outflank them, and to outthink them. He knew full well, many years ago, what today's octopus wrestlers are just beginning to learn—that it is impossible for a man with two arms to apply a full nelson on an octopus; he knew full well the futility of trying for a crotch hold on an opponent with eight crotches.

A 1965 issue of Time magazine documented the growing popularity of octopus wrestling as follows:

Merely to minnow about underwater is no longer enough, and such sports as octopus wrestling are coming increasingly into vogue, particularly in the Pacific Northwest, where the critters grow up to 90 lbs. [41 kg] and can be exceedingly tough customers. Although there are several accepted techniques for octopus wrestling, the really sporty way requires that the human diver go without artificial breathing apparatus.
